= Colima, Mexico =

Colima, Mexico, may refer to:

- The state of Colima, one of the 32 component federal entities of the United Mexican States
- Colima, Colima, capital city of that state
