= La Campana (archaeological site) =

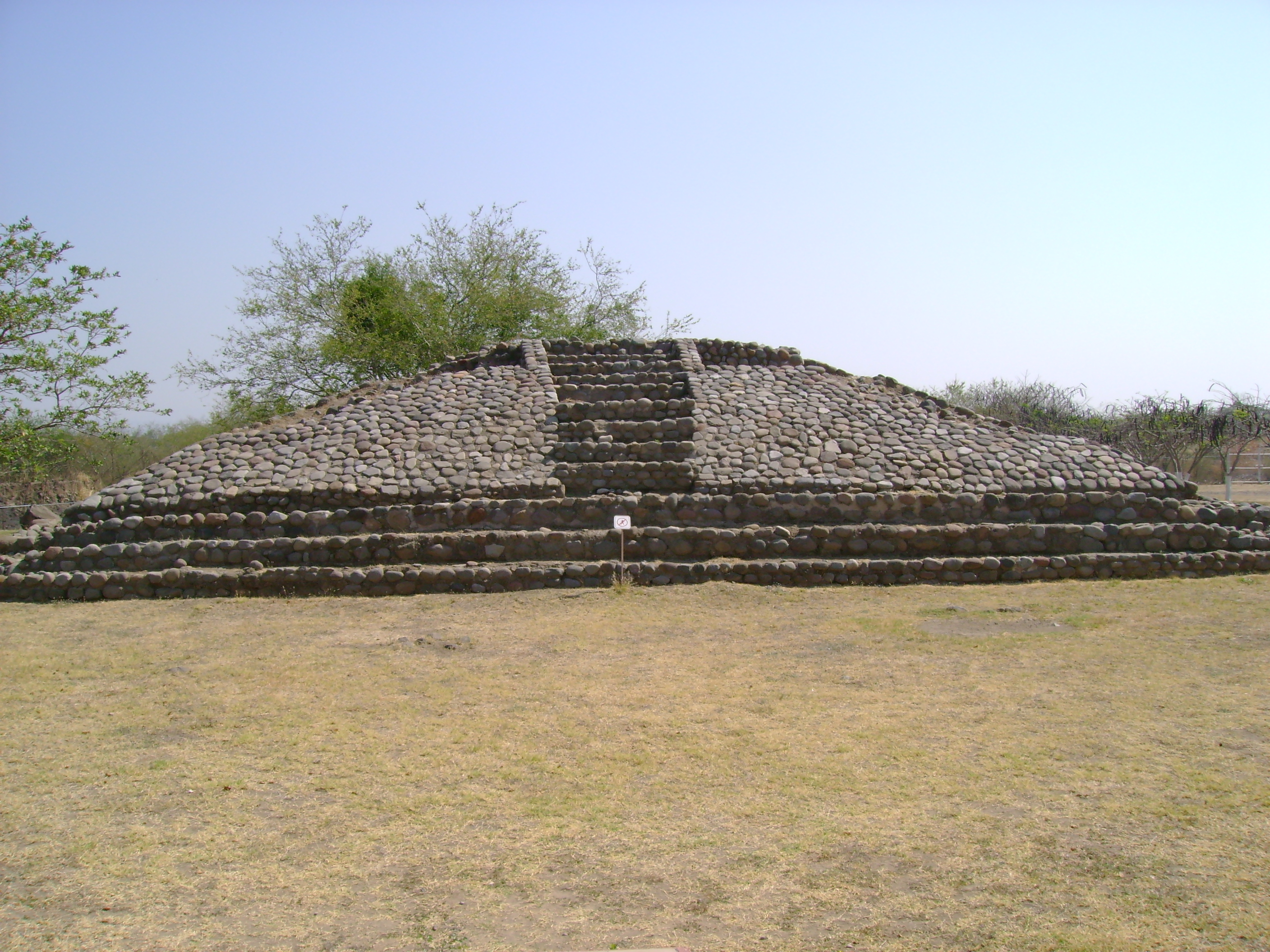
- La Campana Archaeological Site
- Interactive map of La Campana
- 19.2678°N 103.7258°W
- Type: Mesoamerican archaeology
- Cultures: Capacha
- Location: Colima Municipality, Colima State, Mexico
- Region: Mesoamerica

Site notes
- Website: La Campana Archaeological site - INAH

La Campana is an archaeological site included in the Mexican archaeological heritage list since 1917. Located in the vicinity of the city of Colima. This site was the largest prehispanic population center in western Mexico. Site studies indicate that some of its features are related to the classical period Teotihuacan culture.

Vestiges of Capacha phase ceramics, dating from the year 1500 BCE were found onsite. This site features the presence of shaft tombs, ceramics offerings, storm drain systems, avenues and an administrative and religious center with numerous monuments. The site was opened to the public in 1995. The Spaniards discovered the place in 1524, at the time it was known as Almoloyan.m or “place between two rivers”.

== Background ==
During prehispanic times, the region occupied by the modern-day state of Colima was seat of various ethnic groups which flourished in western Mexico. The region was inhabited by various Lordships (not reigns as erroneously stated by some historians) that disputed the territories. At the beginning of the 16th century, Purépecha groups dominated several regions, with the Tzacoalco salt mines owned by Tecos. Because of this, their leader Coliman or Tlatoani Colimotl defeated them. After the salt war, the Tecos took Sayula, Zapotlán and Amula and even reached Mazamitla, becoming the predominant group.

Other sites known in the region:

=== Capacha Complex ===
Settlement of a sedentary Capacha Culture group dedicated to agriculture and ceramics production, their life span was between 2000 and 1000 BCE. The site is located 6 kilometres (3.7 mi) north of Colima Municipality.

=== Los Ortices Complex ===
Archaeologists assign a period between 300 BCE and 300 CE; located southwest of Colima, in the vicinity of the Los Ortices village. This native settlement was more evolved than the Capacha site, they produced finer pottery, also made stone sculpture and buried their dead in "shaft tombs", very characteristic of the region.

=== Armería & Colima Complex ===
Chronologically placed between 600-1100 CE, in an area east of the Colima city, in the El Moralete neighborhood. This native group developed crafts with features somewhat more primitive than the others. Developed a smaller ceramics variety and built rougher shaft tombs.

=== El Chanal Complex ===
El Chanal site developed the most representative style of the region, settled in the El Chanal community. In the mid-20th century a step pyramid was found; at the beginning of the 1990s, discovered esplanades, temples, squares and a ballgame court: architectural evidence of a culture that had reached a high degree of evolution. By 1520, this complex had already disappeared and only remained in the area some native peoples, apparently subjected to another more powerful city, Tecomán.

== History ==
The site originates in very early times, there are traces of Capacha Phase ceramics, from the early Mesoamerican Preclassical. Surface architectural evidence corresponds to the classical horizon (100-1500 CE) its maximum splendor was the period between 700 and 900 CE.

There are streets, a storm drainage system of and a religious and administrative center, with numerous monuments, as well as housing areas, areas with homes erected on platforms both circular and rectangular, with cane and adobe walls and palm ceilings, per the needs of a highly seismic region.

The economy and development of La Campana was influenced by its geographical location in the Valley of Colima, because luxury goods, agricultural products, raw materials and other trade products converged here, from both the west coast and the center of Mexico Also it is considered that at its heyday exercised control over other smaller settlements. It is likely that, according to archaeologists, its decline was related to earthquakes that struck the ceremonial center, leaving only some groups up to 1521.

The site presents evidence of all prehispanic architectural development and the subsoil depicts equal architectural structure complexity. For building construction used stones of various sizes, from rivers, some of them very distant. To join the stones, and build the walls at various heights, they used clay mixed with vegetal fibers, the wall surfaces were covered with flattened stucco, which were subjected to fire in order to cure them and achieve the required quality.

=== Language ===
Much linguistic information was lost as a consequence of the Spanish conquest. Some researchers believe La Campana was a Nahuatl-speaking settlement, but it is thought residents also spoke other languages, some belonging to the Uto-Aztecan language family, which includes the following languages:

- Coracholan Family (Cora and Huichol)
- Nahuatl (Náhuatl)
- Piman Family (Tohono O'odham, Tepehuán, Tepecano, and Névome)
- Taracahita Family (Nuarijío, Mayo, Tarahumara, and Yaqui).

== The Site ==
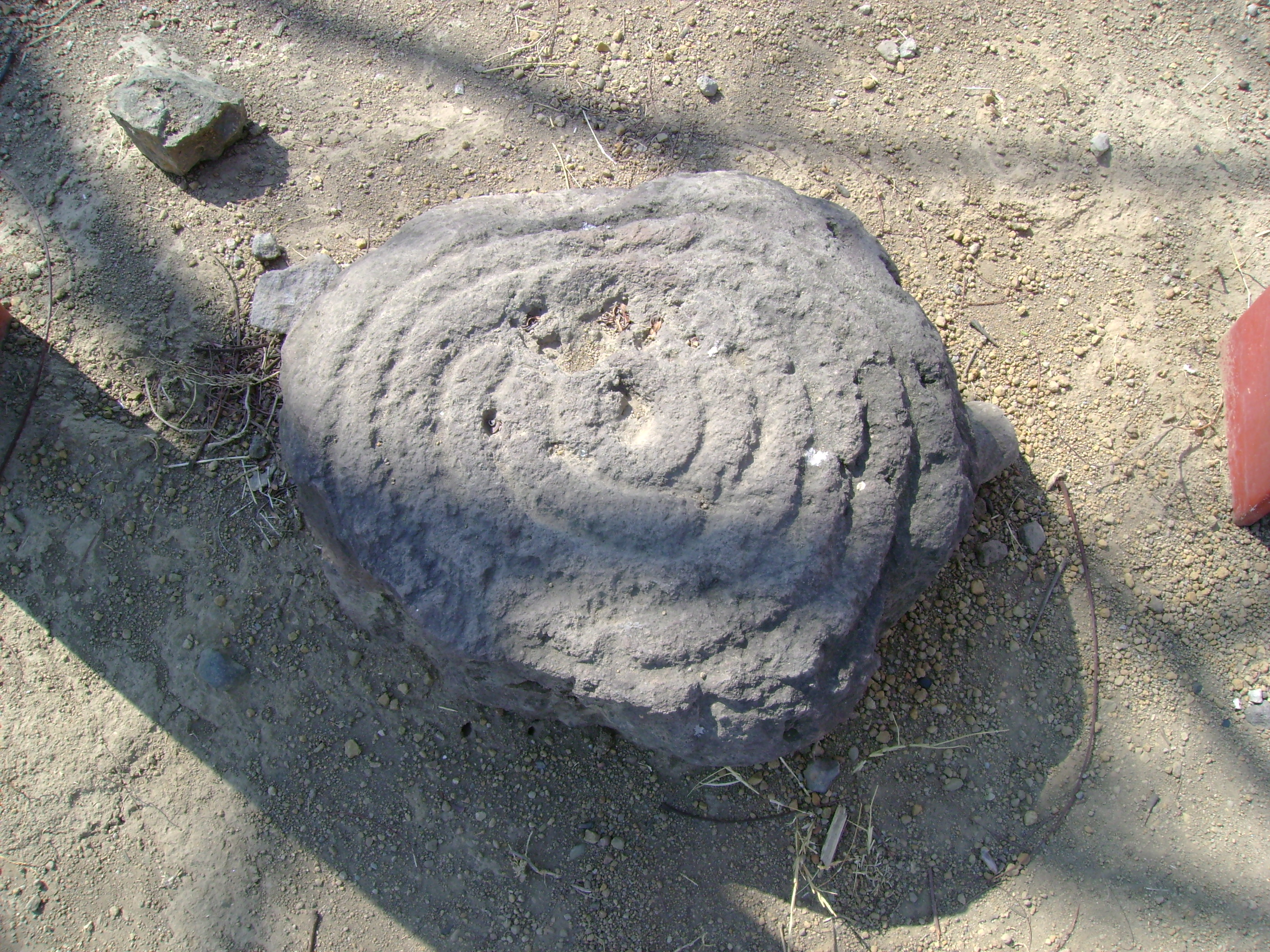
La Campana Petroglyph.

La Campana is only a portion of what was originally a very important prehispanic settlement, whose original name supposedly was Almoloya. A large religious and political-economic control center, but as in many other sites (e.g. Calixtlahuaca) in the 16th century Franciscan friars of the region used material extracted from the prehispanic platforms for their constructions. The first formal signs of the site existence were by Mr. José María Gutiérrez in 1917, he also made a drawing that included some structures. Dr. Miguel Galindo began exploring one of the buildings in 1922.

The archaeological site currently extends over 134 hectares between the Colima River and Pereira creek. To date, archaeologists have been able to explore barely 1% of the total area. Has an administrative ceremonial center, important center with numerous buildings; rectangular platforms of stepped of overlaid bodies, stepped pyramids that formed foundations for large temples and patios, in addition to other types of constructions. There are avenues and a large amount of petroglyphs in multiple patios and squares, in whose interior are structures of various dimensions. From the central point of the site towards the north is a 4 m wide avenue with side stone walls, defined communication element with other settlements, for example El Chanal locate about 3.5 kilometers northwest. Northwest of the site are housing units or early houses, and to the northeast a late section of the site, with a small ballgame court.

The structures location and spatial distribution correspond to a planning and urban character lay out. The administrative-ceremonial center is impressive. It is formed by overlaid platforms with temples and residential constructions on top; and has a storm drainage system.

The constructive system, characteristic of the region included: "round stones" brought from nearby rivers, jointed with clay mortar and finished with fine stucco, subsequently heated (cooked) for hardness and durability. Rectangular and circular dwellings were probably distributed in housing groups, separated by cobbled streets. Had different dimensions and were roofed with palm and grass from the region. Recovered ceramic, although not abundant, probably due to looting suffered for decades, offers interesting data about this culture.

Multiple burials have been found during exploration, which provide new data on funeral customs and rites. It is noted that skeletons often lack hands and feet, as well as the rib cage.

La Campana, which was named by its casual discoverers by the appearance of the mound where it was found, is a place that holds evidence of Mexico western cultures. Its approximate dating is 900 BCE.

== Description ==
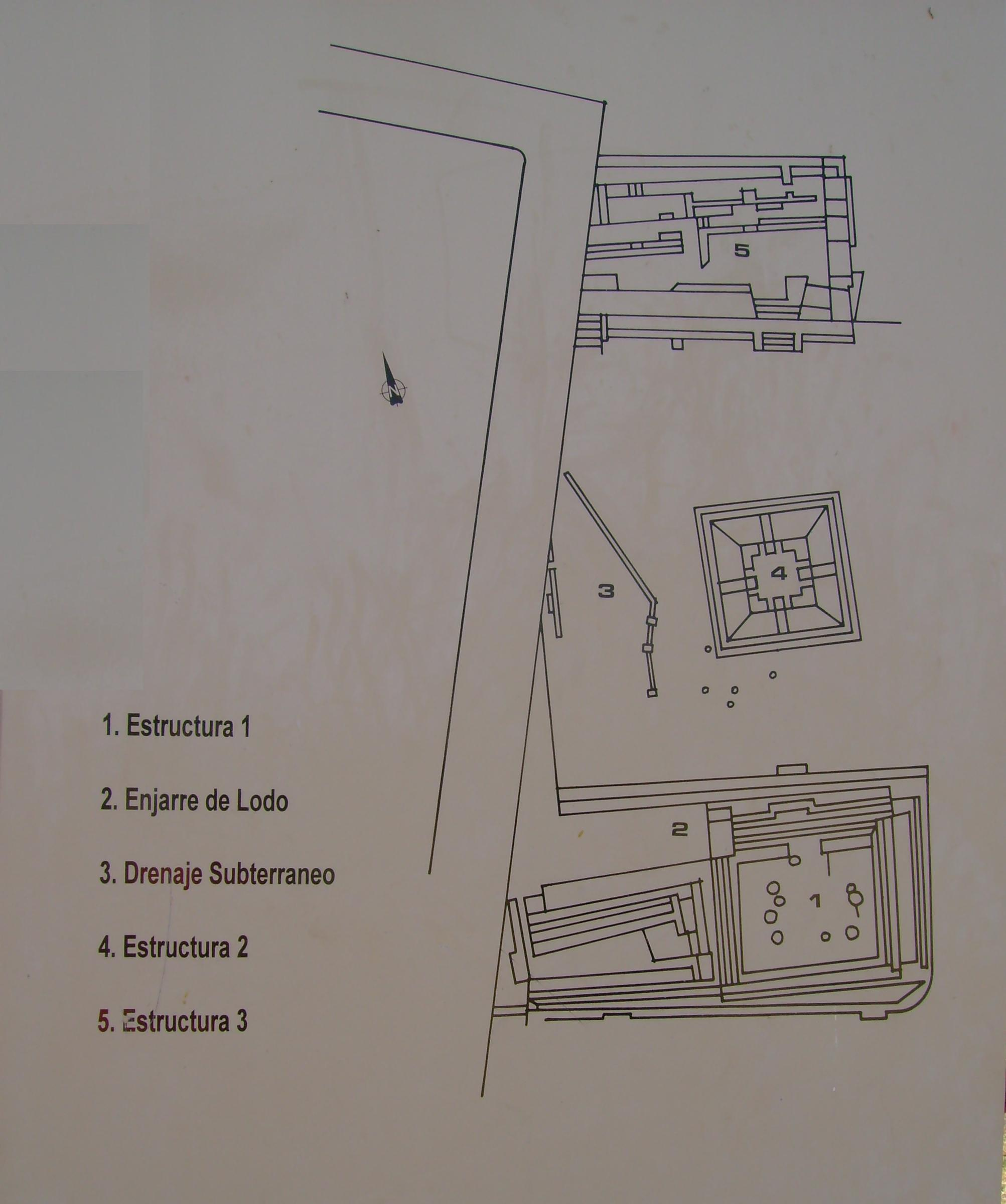
La Campana archaeological site guide map.

La Campana section explored in the first season (1995) is located in a square with a network of decanting drainage wells to dislodge rainwater. It includes Structures 1 consisting of overlaid platforms, in the front, a stairway adorned with stone cubes, resembling a wall (alfarda). At the top is a large structure; inside has circles that define wells, probably used to stored grains and ashes of important people, perhaps priests or warriors killed in battle. In the center is a pyramid altar; its architectural features make it the only building erected on three stepped platforms, the sloped shape resembles the silhouette of the Fuego Volcano, which is assumed was an important cult object at the time. Human skeletal remains were located on both sides of the structure.

A third building, also erected on overlaid platforms, has two entrances that allow access to the top, has spaces defined by walls. It is believed their functions were related to private religious worship by priests who performed rituals there.

Buildings discovered in 1996 are on a huge square higher than the section found in 1995, built with stone and dirt materials over previously constructed buildings. This section presents two large platforms oriented east–west, on which there are a number of altars and small ceremonial rooms. Modest offerings were found in the rubble.

On the eastern side are two large pyramidal structures. The one in the middle only has three levels, the fourth was lost by a modern building at the top; it was built on a rectangular base 25 m per side, has a stairway at the center with side walls. Combines sloped walls with intermediate passages between the different bodies. On top was a compound or altar where priests probably performed rituals. This is deduced from the amount of offerings and artifacts found in the area.

The other building, has large slopped walls, part of the walls were found in 1996. Between both buildings, a ballgame court was built, with a narrow court, oriented east–west, with side slopped walls with a vertical section atop.

Important funeral rites elements were found, relating to prehispanic life after death interpretation. Several shaft tombs were found, with various offerings, domestic and ceremonial type, intended to accompany the deceased in their journey to the underworld.

This site, as well as many others in the region, have shaft tombs, one of these is near structure 6, Tomb No. 7, which besides in addition to the vault where various fragments of human bodies were buried, has a stepped corridor and major offerings that include a dog and clay mask.

=== Structure 1 ===
Located south of the square, its rectangular base is 52 by 36 m; it is large and its construction is based on overlaid and stepped platforms. On top has a rectangular temple, inside has several circles. Access is by several broad stairs ornamented by four cubes. The steps have different heights: the first are significantly higher than the others.

After the site decline, worship continued, inferred by human skeletal remains found.

This structure was stuccoed, evidence of finished cooked clay covering the walls and floors of the building. It is possible that the stucco had decorative motifs, painted with mineral pigments from the region. Samples of the stucco can also be seen at the bottom of the eastern access to Structure 3. Particles of vegetal fibers can be seen mixed with adobe.

=== Structure 2 ===
It is located at the square center, its base measures 20 by 20 m. Its shape depicts a volume and geometry arrangement, with a slender and unique silhouette. This building is a typical Colima architecture. It was built on three square and stepped platforms. Presents a beautiful slopped body with four staggered accesses; these lead to the top which is a square platform. Burials were found at its base.

=== Below grade drainage ===
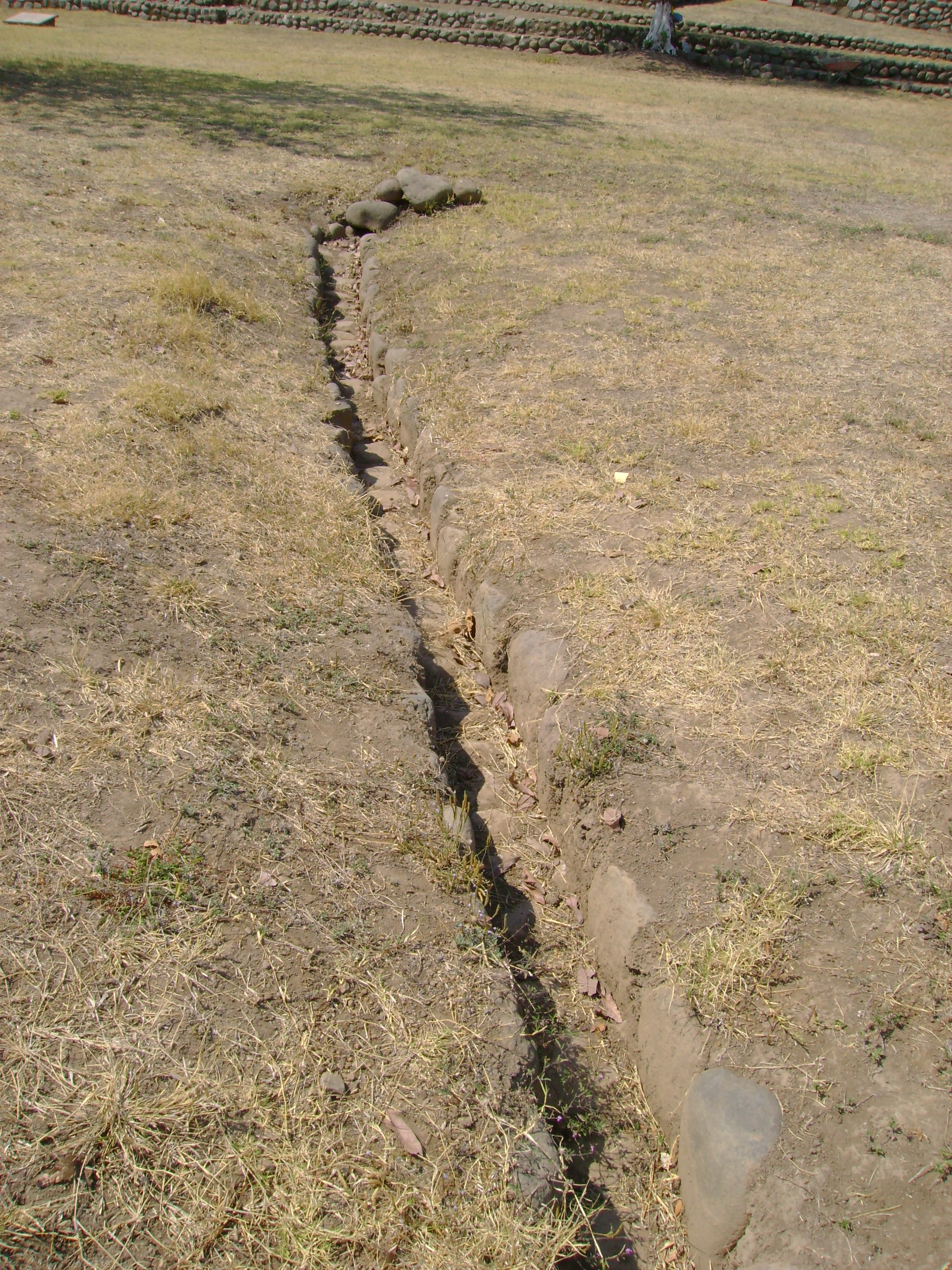
Underground drainage.

Next to Structure 2 are some petroglyphs. In this area are parts of the underground drainage system, made to collect and evacuate storm rain water. It was originally covered with stones. Its lay out follows the buildings arrangement.

=== Structure 3 ===
It is located northwest of the square, its base is 43 by 9 m; It is large and its construction is made with from overlaid stepped platforms similar to Structure 1. It has two entrances to the top; its elevation does not exceed 3 meters. There are holes at its base, probably to hold water or storage.

=== Structure 4 ===
It is located southeast of the square and its base is 60 by 24 m; It is large and its construction is based on overlaid stepped platforms. It has 3 different accesses to the top and a significant elevation with a rainwater disposal system. Everything seems to indicate that this area were the homes of noble people.

Structure 4 has 11 medium size rooms, probably roofed with palm leaves supported by wooden columns.

It has communication to Structure 5, and in front of Structure 4 there is a small square, as well as a solar clock at the entrance of the Structure 5.

=== Structure 5 ===
Square shape pyramidal building that dominates the urban complex, its base measures 26 by 31 m. It is a prehispanic monumental architecture building sample, evidence of the work, social desire, and artistic creativity of its constructors. The original Structure had several overlaid bodies, but currently only three are preserved. On the impressive basement top was a temple. Inside is another construction corresponding to an older building. Late changes are evident in the left side of the building.

=== Structure 6 ===
This building is characterized by its enormous slopes and corridors that define different bodies; their shape and orientation obey Mesoamerican astronomical-religious and geometric concepts. At its top has large plazas, the lower section of the temple has stepped accesses and the place was probably used by priests for their rituals. Its orientation allowed observing the sun rise and sunset. It was used and modified by some late prehispanic groups. Its base measures 24 by 16 m.

=== Ballgame court ===
Located between Structures 5 & 6, it measures 16 by 8 m; space defined by a rectangular court, oriented on an east–west axis and delimited by two important lateral structures. This place was used to practice Tlalchi, ritual ballgame, with a symbolism associated with fertility and political-religious transcendence. Even after abandoned, the city continued to be a cult place.

=== Structure 11 ===
Pyramidal temple, square base with four stepped accesses and measuring 24 by 9 m. Its orientation follows architectural principles based on geometrical shapes with astronomical elements and the symbolism associated to the cardinal points. On top was a small platform where political and religious ceremonies.

Two constructive stages were detected in this building. The first during the Classical period (100 BCE to 500 CE). Subsequently, modifications were made between 700 and 900 CE.

=== Structure 12 ===
It consists of a platform significantly projected, because it defines the central square, and at the same time is a communication element with another square in the north. Rooms and temples were built on it. From evidence found, it is assumed that this platform had residential purposes for those engaged in religious worship.

=== Cascabel Pyramid ===
This structure has a rattle (Cascabel) snake sculpted in stone at the bottom of the access 1; it is symbolically related to the water cult. The snake was part of the water God (Tlaloc) representation and was associated with clouds, rain and lightning. Tlaloc was supposed to be a fire snake which passed through the region and when falling sank into the ground. Similar representations are found in temples of the Teotihuacan culture.

== Gallery ==
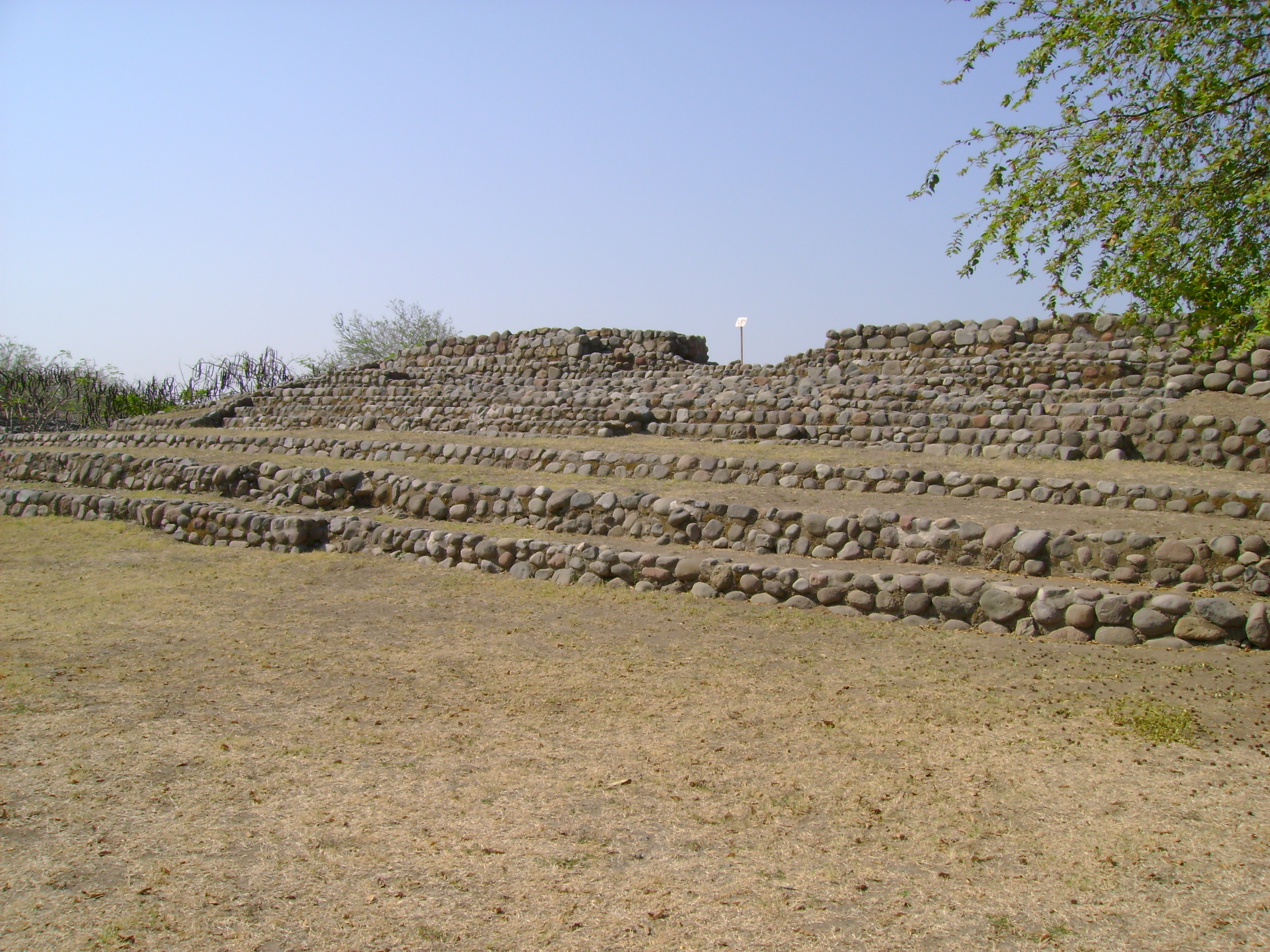

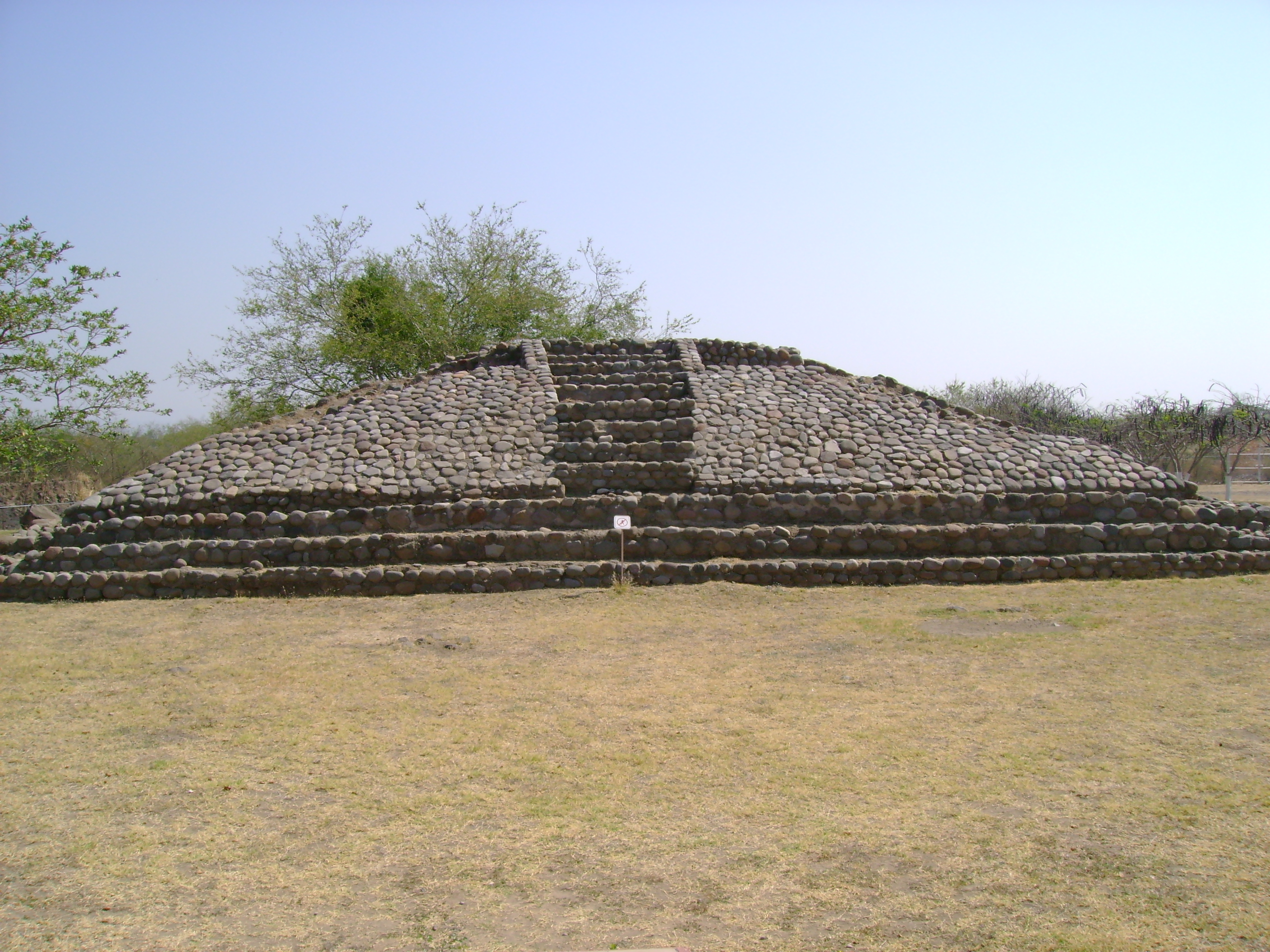

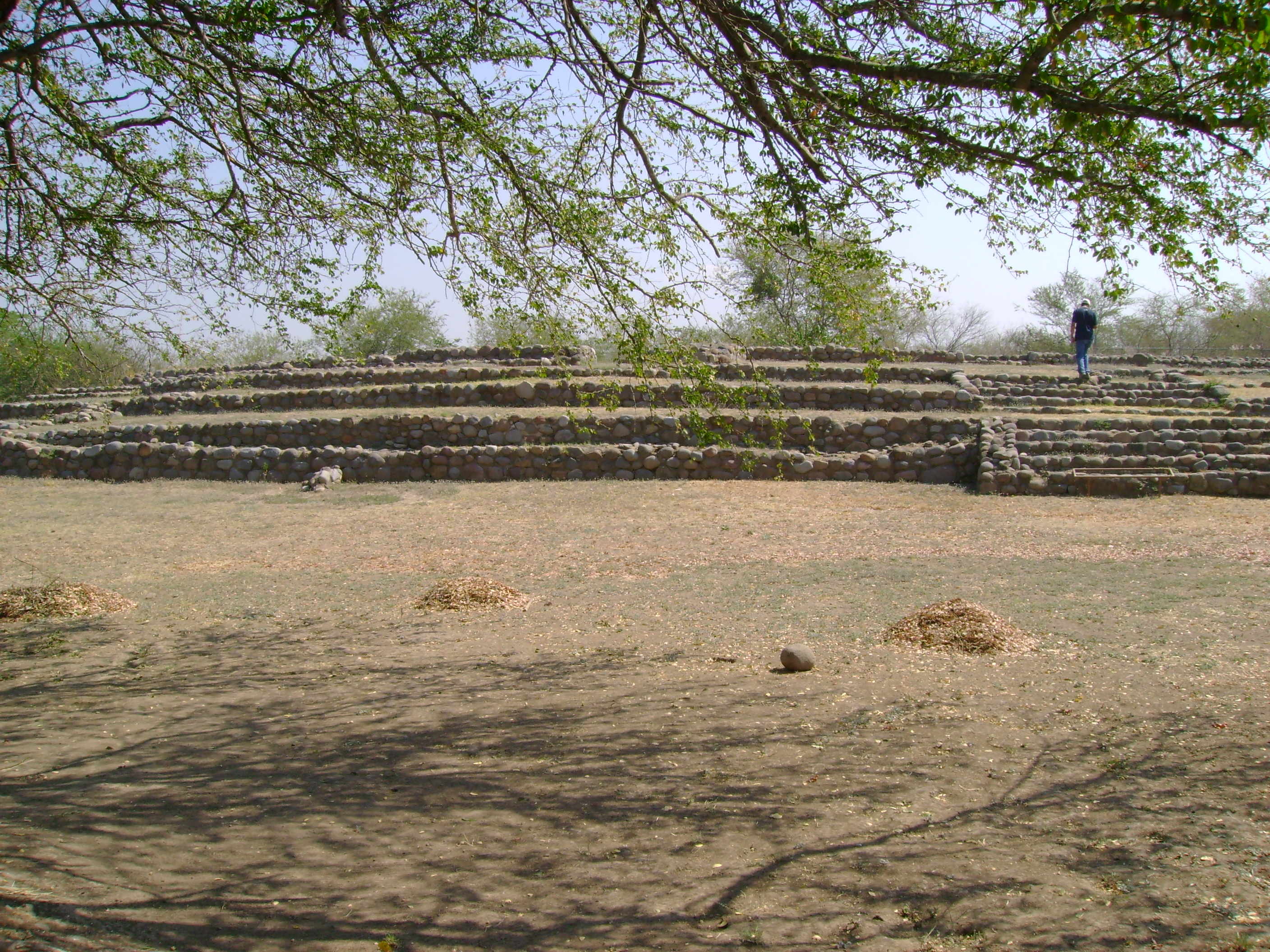

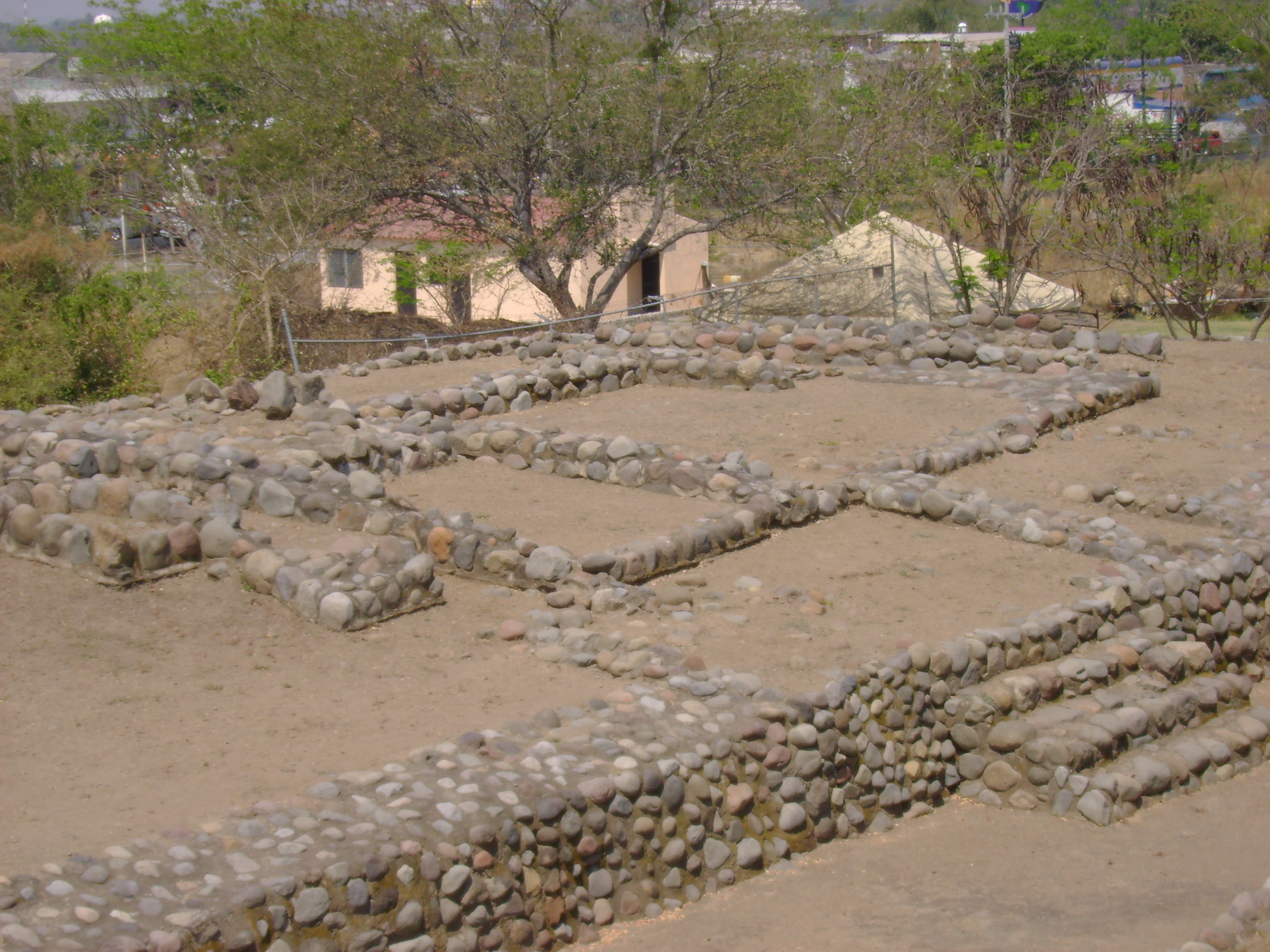

Top row: Structures 1 to 4

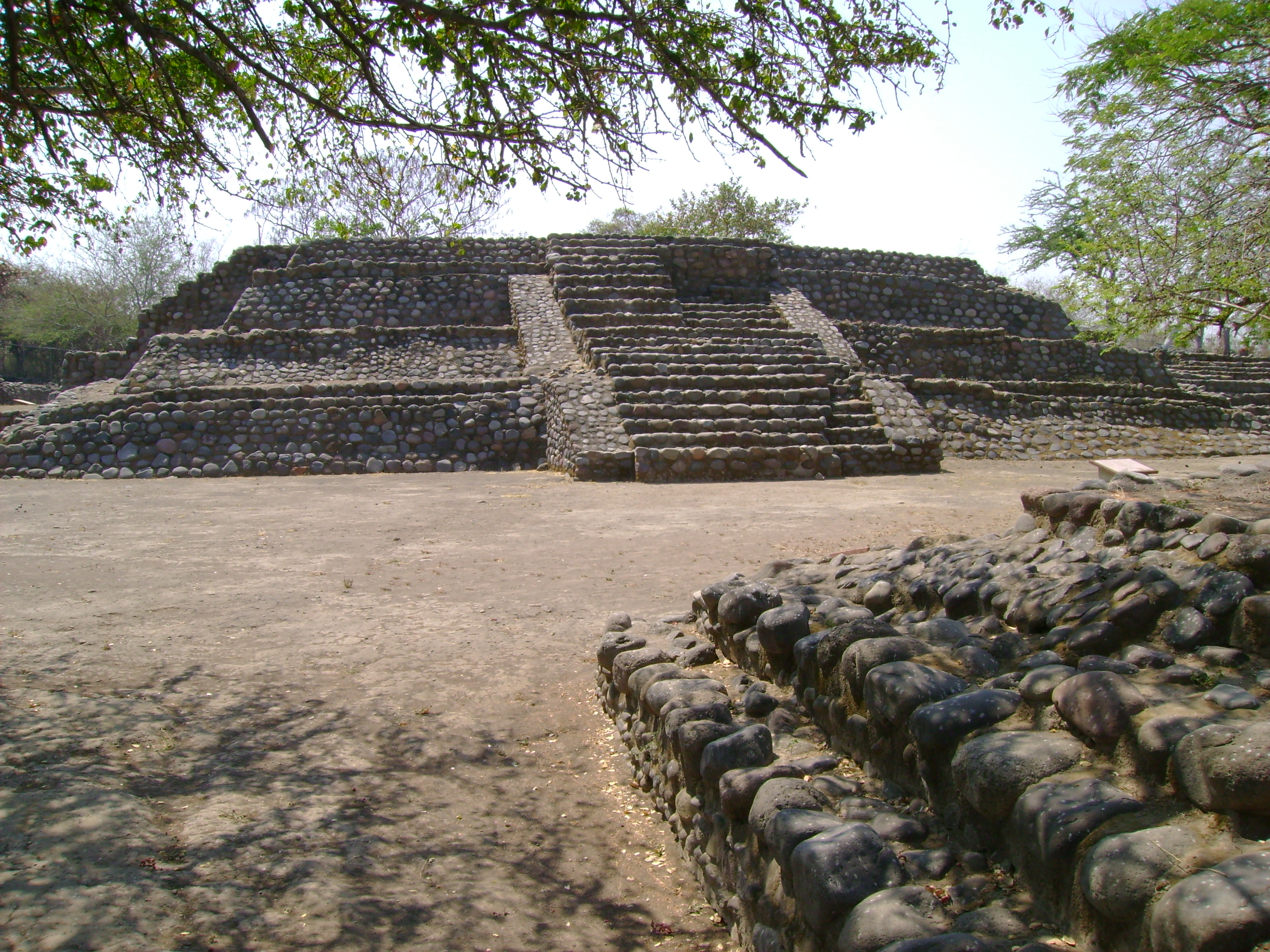

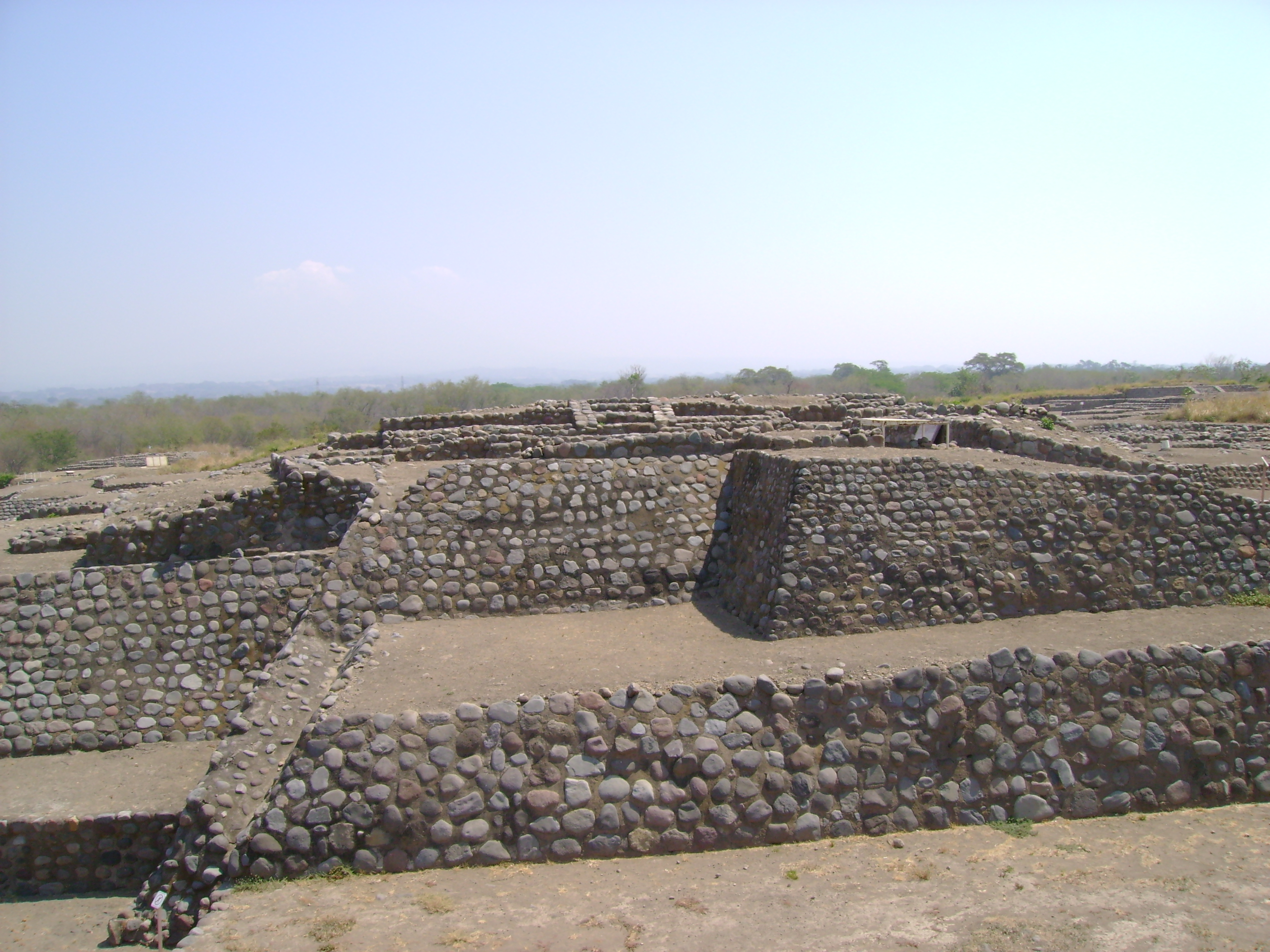

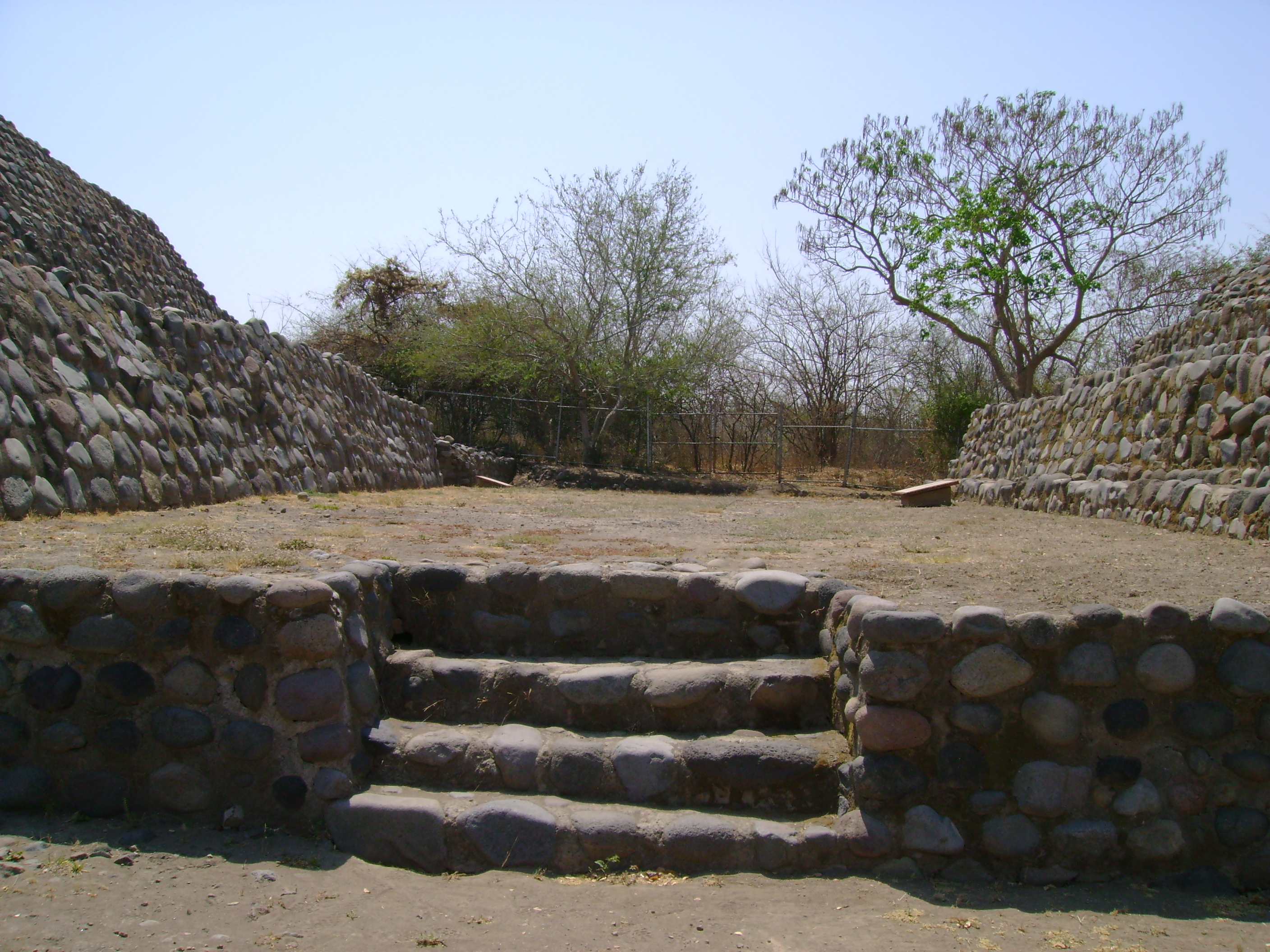

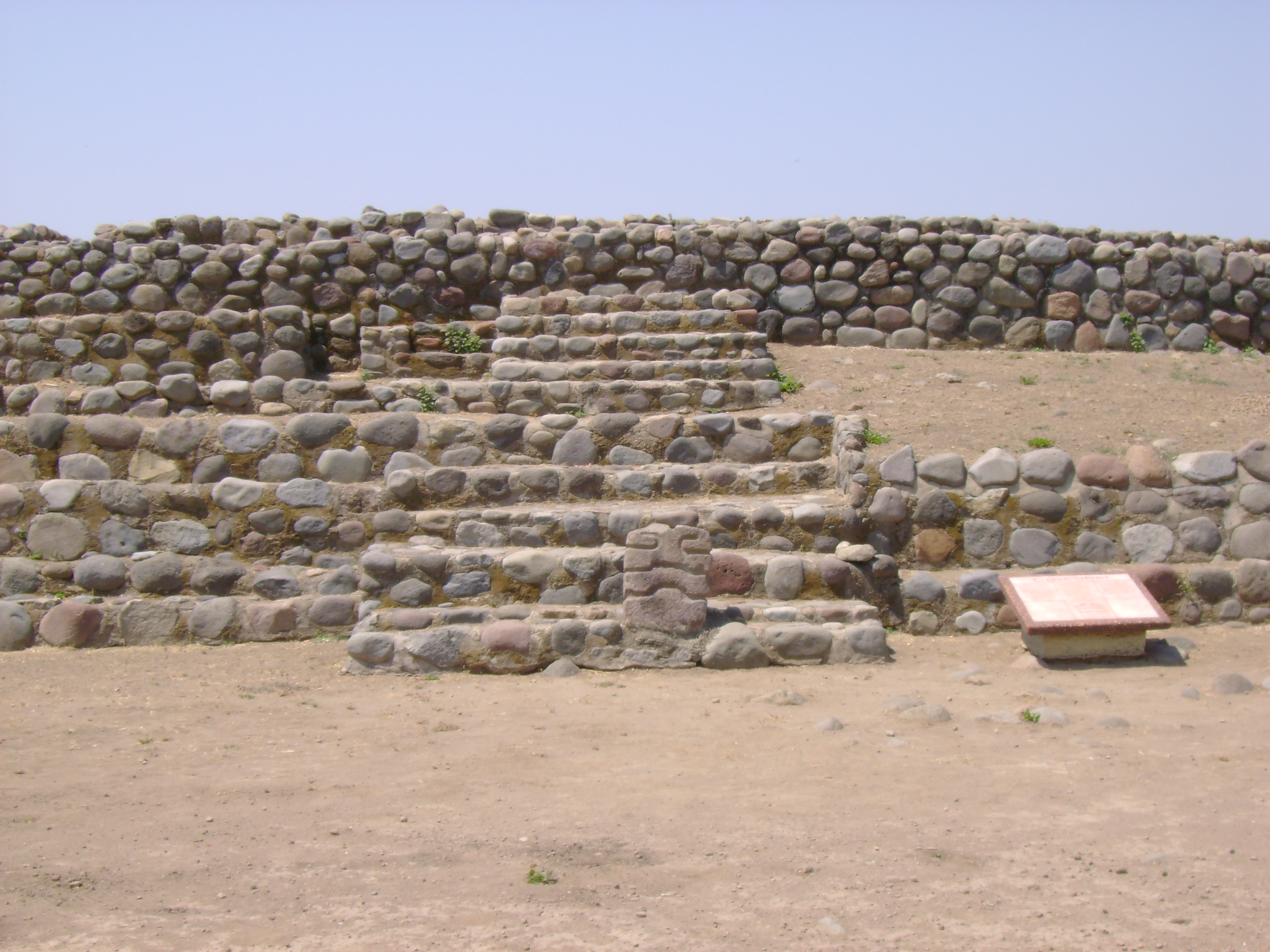

Lower row: Structures 5 and 6, Ballgame court, Rattle Pyramid

== See also ==
- El Chanal — archaeological site.
- Colima Municipality
- Colima State
