= María Teresa Pomar =

Mexican art historian

María Teresa Pomar (December 15, 1919 – January 12, 2010) was a Mexican art historian. She was a collector, researcher and promoter of Mexican handcrafts and folk art along with the communities associated with them. She began as a collector then working with museums to promote handcrafts and then working to found a number of museums and other organizations to the same purpose. She became one of Mexico's foremost experts on the subject, serving as director of different organizations and judge at competitions in Mexico and abroad. She died in 2010 while she was serving as the director of the Museo Universitario de Artes Populares of the University of Colima, which changed its name to honor her.

== Life ==
She was born on December 15, 1919, in Guanajuato. She moved to Guadalajara as a child, following her father who was a professional musician. There her mother died when she was only eight years old and was raised by her grandmother Antonia Badajos.

Starting in 1940, she began collecting Mexican handcrafts and folk art. At first she kept her acquisitions in her apartment but soon it was overflowing and she rented the apartment across from her to use as storage. Later she acquired a house in Coyoacán which was larger to accommodate her growing collection which included textiles, glass, miniatures, toys, cartonería, niños dios, nativity scenes and much more.

She died on January 12, 2010, in Mexico City. She was buried at the Panteón Jardín in Mexico City.

== Career ==
As a collector, she began to research the items and the people who made them. She also made her collections available for special exhibitions in both Mexico and abroad until her death, for example the lending of 99 niños dios figures to the Instituto de Desarrollo Artesanal del Estado de Zacatecas for a temporary exhibit. She also made donations to museums in both Mexico and abroad including textiles to the Museo de Arte Popular in São Paulo, Brazil and the Sobichille Museum in Siena, Italy. Her donation of 1,700 pieces to the Museo de Guanajuato allowed for the opening of a hall dedicated to miniatures.

She was an integral part of the establishment of museums and other institutions dedicated to the promotion of Mexican handcrafts and folk art including those in Hermosillo, Tabasco, Chiapas, Puebla, Jalisco, Querétaro, Veracruz, Mexico City, Tuxtla Gutiérrez, Tlaxcala and Monterrey. She also was founder or co-founder of other institutions as well such as the Na Bolom Cultural Association and the POPULART AC Association. She participated at the formation of the Casa de las Artesanías of the State of Mexico, the Fondo Nacional para al Fomento de las Artesanías, the Populart Association and the Sna Jolobil organization in Chiapas.

Her work made her one of Mexico's foremost experts in handcrafts. She was curator of over 130 exhibitions, the most important of which related to textiles. She served as a judge for over three hundred handcraft competitions in Mexico. She also served in similar events in Cuba, Venezuela, Puerto Rico, Colombia and the United States. Pomar was also a researcher, spending her life to research and preserve community and indigenous traditions along with handcrafts. She was the director of the Museo Nacional de Artes e Industrias Populares of the Instituto Nacional Indigenista. She promoted the teaching of handcrafts in schools in order to keep it as a vital part of Mexican culture. Her work documenting the copper work in Santa Clara del Cobre earned her the Manuel Gamio Prize in 1985. She received the Diego Rivera State Art Prize by the Colima state congress in 2007.
