= Museo Universitario de Artes Populares María Teresa Pomar =

Coordinates: 19°14′54.48″N 103°43′20.28″W

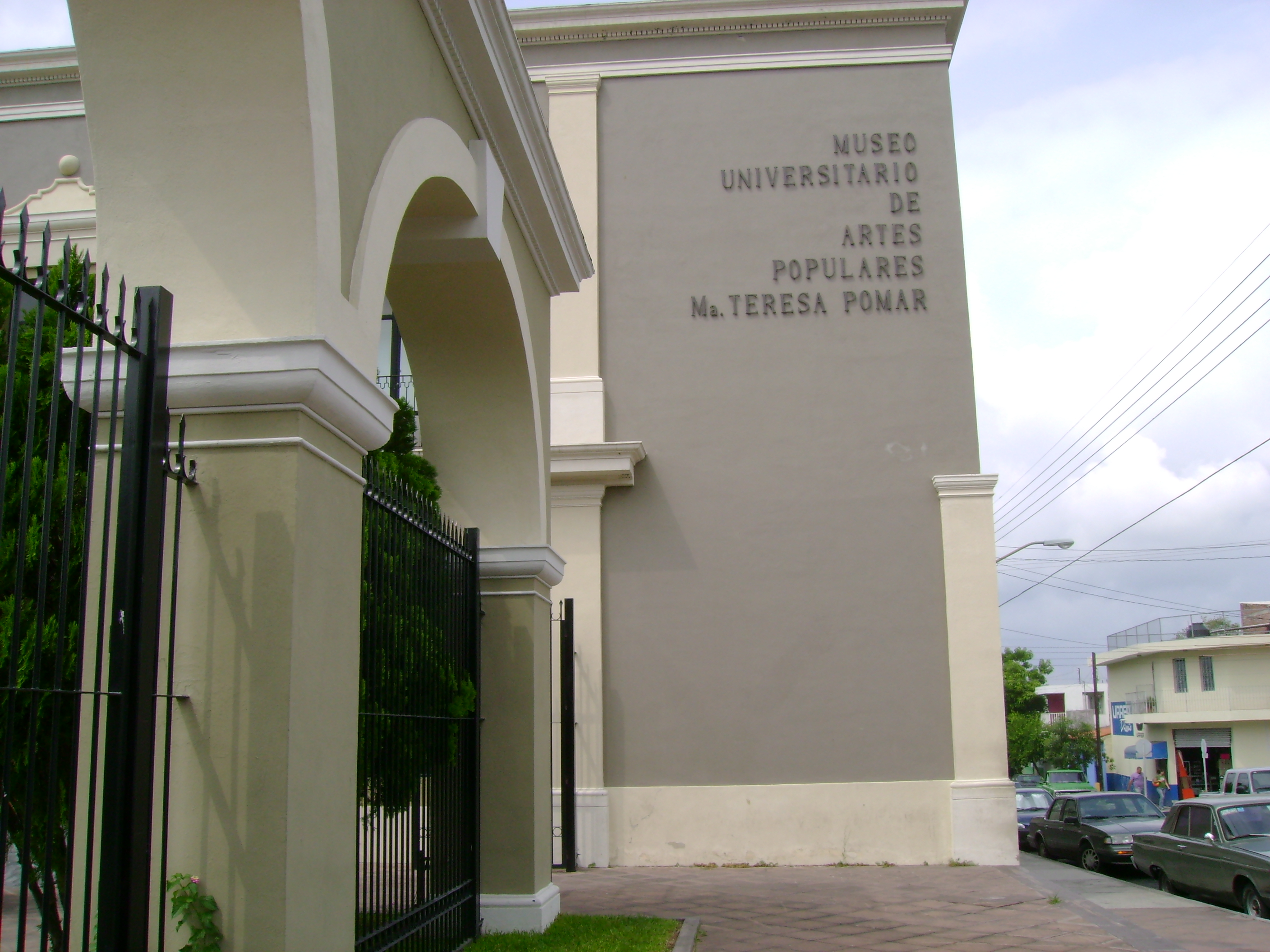
Entrance to the museum

Museo Universitario de Artes Populares María Teresa Pomar is a museum dedicated to Mexico's handcrafts and folk art tradition, called “artesanía.” It is part of the University of Colima in the city of Colima, founded by artesanía collector and promoter María Teresa Pomar. It contains one of the most important collections of its type in Mexico, covering traditions from around the country as well as the artesanía and traditions of the state of Colima.

== Institution ==
The museum is part of the University of Colima, north of the historic center of the city of Colima. It is part of a complex called the IUBA, which also houses the Pablo Silva Garía forum and the Explanada del Artesano (Artisan Esplanade) on the corner of Gabino Barreda and Manuel Gallardo Zamora streets in the La Atrevida neighborhood.

The building was designed by architect Joaquín Vázquez Agraz and modeled after the traditional houses of the city. It is two stories, centered on an open courtyard which is surrounded by corridors supported by arches behind which are rooms. The museum's collection is housed in these rooms and corridors, with the courtyard area filled with chairs and tables for visitors.

The institution hosts an important permanent collection of Mexican handcrafts and folk art, called artesanía, with the major branches of this tradition from all regions of the country represented. Notable artisans with works on display here include Guillermo Ríos, Emilio Pinto, Pancho Muñoz and the Terríquez and Morfín families. The museum also promotes the artesanía and regional traditions of the state of Colima. The handcrafts of Colima were shaped by Spanish colonialism and by the crafts of other regions of Mexico such as the Talavera pottery tradition of Puebla and the barro negro pottery tradition of Oaxaca. For this reason, a wide variety of handcrafts are produced in the state. The museographers of the institution have included Ma. Teresa Pomar A., Imelda de León, Socorro Sánchez Murguía and José Antonio Enciso Núñez, the current director.

On the upper floor, there are rooms dedicated to temporary exhibitions of works by artisans, many of which are themed in accordance to the time of year. In 2011, the museum sponsored an exhibit dedicated to marionettes, which have a place in Mexico's tradition of oral storytelling.

Services that the museum offers include a library with books and video related to handcrafts and the traditions of Colima. There are educational programs, guided tours and a workshop to make bruñido pottery. There is a gift shop. The museum has sponsored events to promote local artisans and works with the university providing cultural activities in which students can participate for credit. This includes participating in workshops such as those for producing ceramics, given by Guillermo Ríos.

== Maria Teresa Pomar ==
The museum has recently added the name of María Teres Pomar to its official title. Pomar founded the museum as part of a long career dedicated to the promotion of Mexican artesanía. She began her career as an artesania collector with pieces from many traditions filling her home. She promoted the viewing of her collection encouraging people to appreciate the traditions behind the objects. She donated items to museums in Mexico and to the Museo de Arte Popular of Sao Paulo, Brazil. She was one of the founders of the Fondo Nacional para el Fomento de las Artesanías as well as POPULART, AC, the organization behind the creation of the Museo de Arte Popular in Mexico City. In 2006, she received the Premio Estatal de Artes Diego Rivera (Diego Rivera State Arts Prize) from the state of Colima. Pomar died at the age of 90 in Mexico City in January 2010.

== Collection ==
The museum has one of Mexico's important handicraft and folk art collections. Its collection includes utensils, religious and ceremonial items, and decorations. All the major branches of Mexican artesanía are represented including woodworking, textiles and other weaving, leather-working, paper crafts, ceramics, metalworking, traditional toys, and jewelry making. There are spaces dedicated to folk paintings, especially those related to the indigenous groups of Mexico.

The Sala Colima contains costumes used for the dances and processions that are practiced in the state with masks, musical instruments and more. It includes a representation of a traditional wedding from the north of the state. Another feature are “mojigangas” which are used during charreada and bullfight events in Villa de Álvarez.

The Sala de la Laca, or lacquer ware room, is dedicated to wood and other items that have been painted with lacquer to protect them from the area's humidity. Items on display include furniture, chests, gourds and other containers for food and other objects. These items are part of a craft tradition which extends from Michoacán and Guerrero into Colima, Oaxaca and Chiapas. The room contains some non-lacquered wood items, demonstrating the woodworking traditions of the Seris, Tarahumaras and Nahuas.

The Textile Room features shawls called rebozos, especially those from Santa Maria del Río in San Luis Potosí, made on backstrap and European pedal looms. Many of these are colored with natural dyes and elaborately embroidered. The Sala de Fibras Vegetales (Vegetable Fiber Room) focuses on basketry and other objects such as mats and hats. The materials used vary greatly from stiff branches to soft reeds.

Leatherworking, amate paper, folk art, and more are displayed in the largest room of the buildings. It contains huarache sandals, belts, bags, amate paper cutouts used for ceremonial purposes from San Pablito Pahuatlan, Puebla. Ceramics traditions from San Bartolo Coyotepec, Metepec, Tonalá, Tlaxcala, Veracruz, Guanajuato, Michoacán and other places are represented. Traditional toys and festival items are represented by Judas figures from the State of Mexico, dolls and miniature items made from wood and clay. Metalworking is mostly represented by articles from Oaxaca such as lead soldier figures and traditional tools. There is a display of objects made of seashell and snail shell by Socorro Sanchez.
