= El Chanal =

Archaeological site near Colima, Mexico

El Chanal Archaeological Site
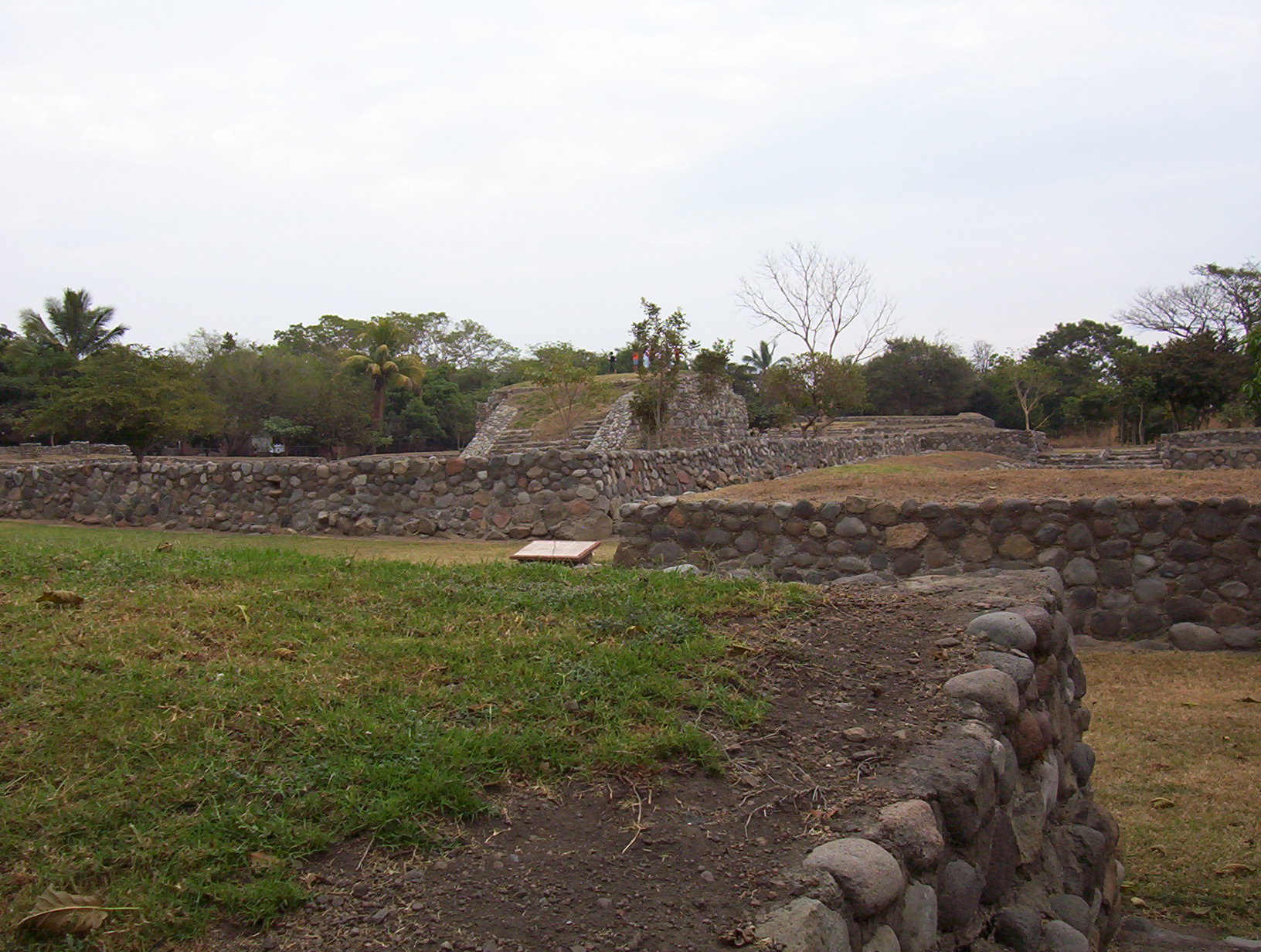
- View of El Chanal archaeological site
- Interactive map of El Chanal Archaeological Site
- 19°17′34″N 103°42′20″W
- Type: Archaeology
- Periods: Mesoamerican Postclassical
- Cultures: Unknown
- Location: Colima City, Colima, Mexico
- Region: Mesoamerica

History
- Built: 1100 - 1400 CE maximum splendor

Site notes
- Website: El Chanal archaeological site

El Chanal is an archaeological site located at El Chanal town, 4 kilometres (2.5 mi) north of the city of Colima, Mexico. Based on its extension, over 50 hectares (120 acres), it is probable that it was the largest settlement of the state of Colima; it developed on both banks of the “Río Verde” or Río Colima. This archeological zone is maintained by the people of El Chanal. The area may have been inhabited by native groups around 1300 BC, achieving its maximum splendor between 1100 and 1400 CE. There is a Nahuatl connection shown by archaeological materials representing deities such as Tláloc and Ehécatl.

Architectonically, the Chanal used the double temple concept, palaces with portals, ceremonial spaces with Mesoamerican ballgame, sidewalk-altar and altar-platform. Ceramics found indicates the massive use of braziers and “sahumerios” (used to burn Copal resin), associated with ceremonial rituals.

Some polychromatic images recreate divine attributes, observed in stone reliefs which have made this site somewhat famous.

Obviously there are many unknowns about the solemnity and majesty that surround the ceremonial spaces. But what we do know is that the whole town is and archeological zone that more treasures might found there. About the daily life in neighborhoods and community spaces, and all events that built this great city. A scientific investigation and formal exploration of this important site is indeed needed.

== The name ==
The name of the site is related to folkloric beings known as "chanos" that inhabited water streams. From the many Tlaloc (rain god) representations in the region, it is likely that the El Chanal, was a remembrance of the myths probably associated with Tlaloc worship.

There is a version that relates El Chanal with “Place inhabited by water custodians”.

In the Mexican State of Chiapas, is a municipality with the same name, according to the municipalities encyclopedia of Mexico, the “Chanal” name means "wise man that teaches".

== Origins ==
The ethnic background of the site inhabitants has yet to be determined; ceramic materials found are not easily associated with the Colima ceramic tradition.

It is considered that site had artisan groups that knew metallurgical techniques. The presence of metal associated with plumbate vessels, used obsidian, manufactured clay sculptures with figures of “Xantiles” and Xipe Totec seem an indication that El Chanal was inhabited by a group, somehow related with Tula.

Unfortunately, the Colima prehispanic ceramic was subject of theft and illegal trade, some pieces are in museums abroad.

== The site ==
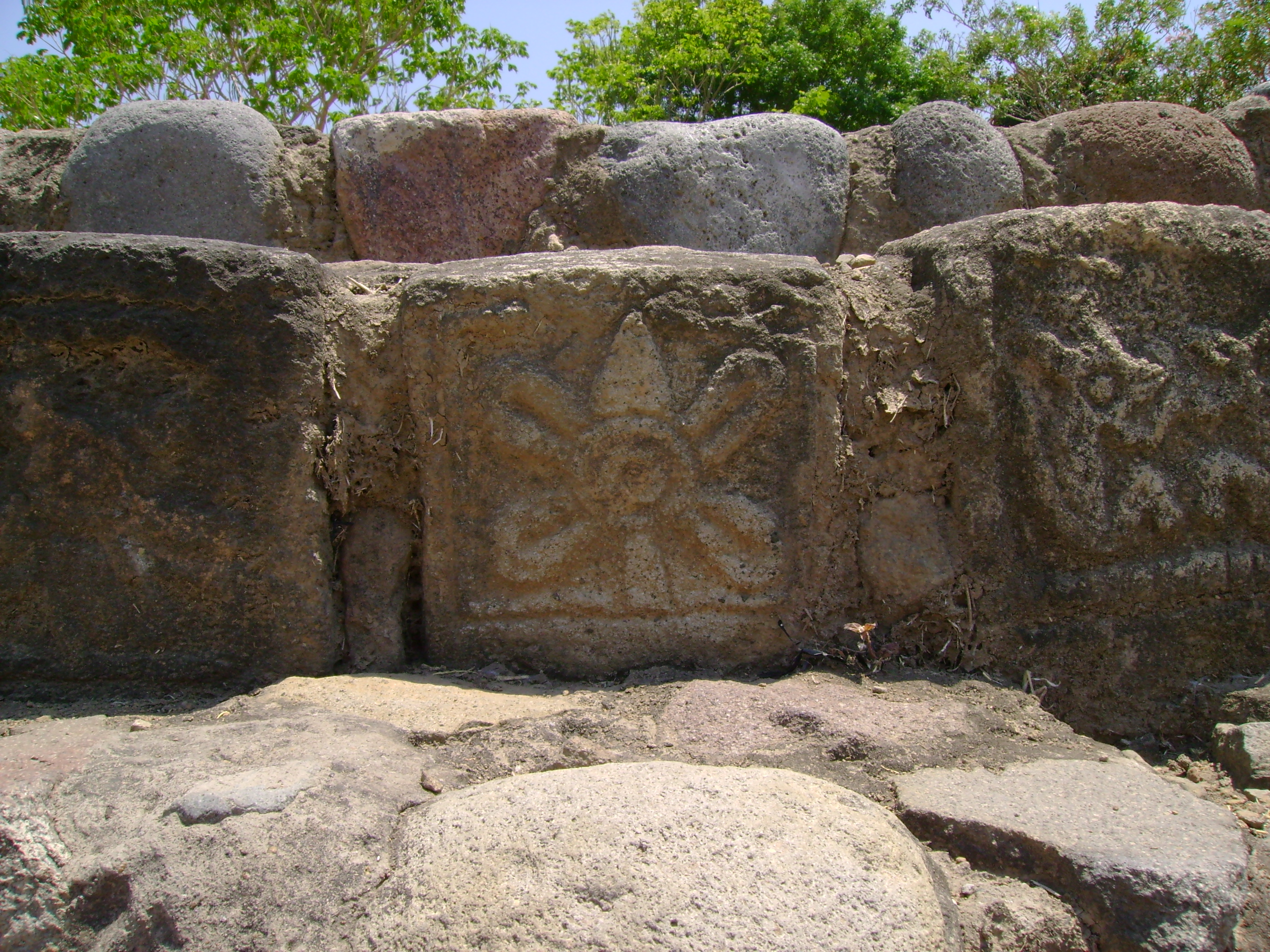
Ollín Petroglyph.

The site has ceremonial spaces, plazas, central altars, and ballgame courts. In 1945 the site was explored by archaeologist Vladimiro Rosado Ojeda, who discovered a pyramid with remains of a stairway and bas-relief engraved steps. The motifs had 36 tablets (Nine per step) that displayed Gods images such as Tlaloc and Ehécatl. Among the structures are the Ossuary, the Pyramid and the Great Platform

The north–south slope that characterizes the Colima valley was advantageously used by the Chanal constructors; the town was arranged following its contour.

The pyramidal structures were built using rounded stone from nearby rivers beds. Some of the stones have petroglyphs with animal figures, plants and possible deities.

El Chanal has six plazas or important ceremonial centers:

=== Altars Plaza ===
Include two altars, one of rectangular shape, very deteriorated and other is circular, where several burials were found.

=== Ballgame court ===
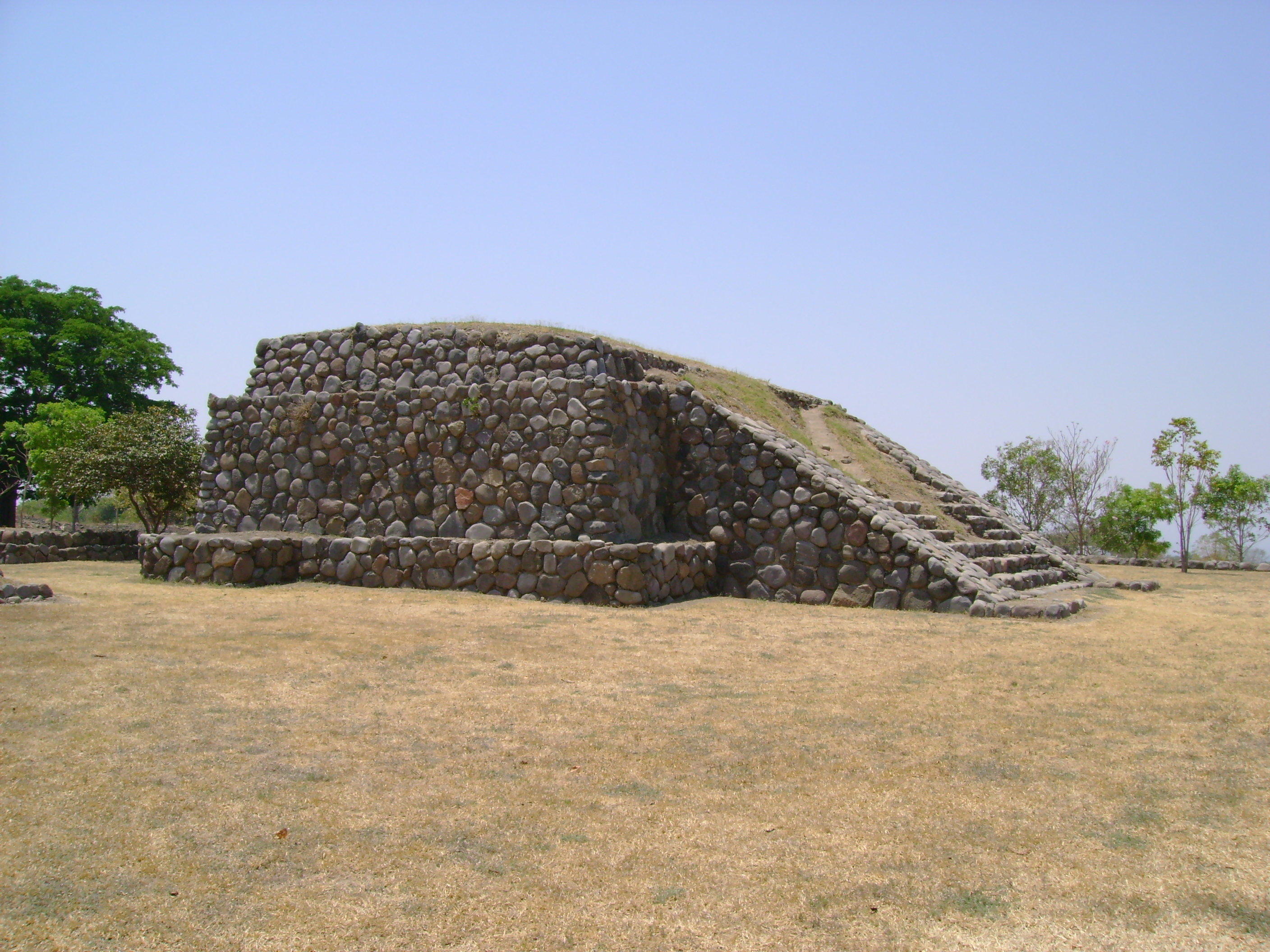
Pyramidal Structure.

Located south of the “Plaza del Tiempo”, separated by a corridor, measures 38 by 13.5 meters.

The presence of a Mesoamerican ballgame court in the south of the archaeological site as part of ceremonial spaces is evidence of the strong religious life of the site. The cosmic sense of the town allowed battles by deities to culminate at the court, that fought day after day and allowed the reign of day and night and, hence the construction of the “Time Plaza”, include in the northeast the “Day and Night” Plaza and the “Water Plaza” at the northwest. The game deity was Xolotl that accompanied the sun in its passage through the underworld and announced its success over darkness by means of Venus, the morning star. The game rules, played by men, featured, a fundamental character for the world future. It is very probable that human sacrifice contemplated the magic that allowed supporting the fight of the light against the darkness.

=== Plaza del Día y la Noche ===
“Day and Night Plaza” Represents a large open space 60 by 80 meters, delimited to the south by a retaining wall; to the west is structure 2 and to the east is structure1.

The acute El Chanal settler's religiosity is evident in the magnificent ritual and ceremonial spaces. There are two essential elements: The temples, represented by these native groups of western Mexico, are the home of gods on earth; and the plazas, as congregation spaces for the faithful masses. Some temples had public functions and were accessed by ample entrances. Others, however, had restricted entrances to which only the religious and civil authorities could enter. A way to describe and learn what their use was, is by observing the type of materials used associated with the temples. In relation to the ample platform, it had on top two wooden rooms with roofs made of perishable materials, it is possible they used “sahumerios” and small incense dispensers. It is therefore probable, that the place was visited with the purpose of burning incense such as Copal, and render individual and simple tributes to the Gods.

=== Plaza del Tiempo ===
The “Time Plaza” contains the most impressive site buildings: structures 1 and 3.

==== Structure 2 ====
Composed by two bodies in the west side and three in the east.

=== Plaza del Agua ===
The “Water Plaza” is made up of a series of low platforms with inner patios, corridors and open plazas.

=== Patio alto ===
The “High Patio” corresponds to the residential housing area of the site.

=== Plaza del Altar ===
The round “Altar Plaza” visually dominates the plazas of Altars and Time.

== How to get there ==
The El Chanal archaeological site is located at the present day town of El Chanal, 4 kilometres (2.5 mi) north of the City of Colima via a dirt road. Visits are Tuesday through Sunday from 9:00 to 17:00 hrs.

== Notes ==
=== References ===
- Página sobre El Chanal en el sitio del Instituto Nacional de antropología e Historia (in Spanish)
- Introducción a la Arqueología del Occidente de México. INAH-Universidad de Colima. Beatriz Braniff Cornejo. 2004 (in Spanish)
