= Colima (city) =

- City
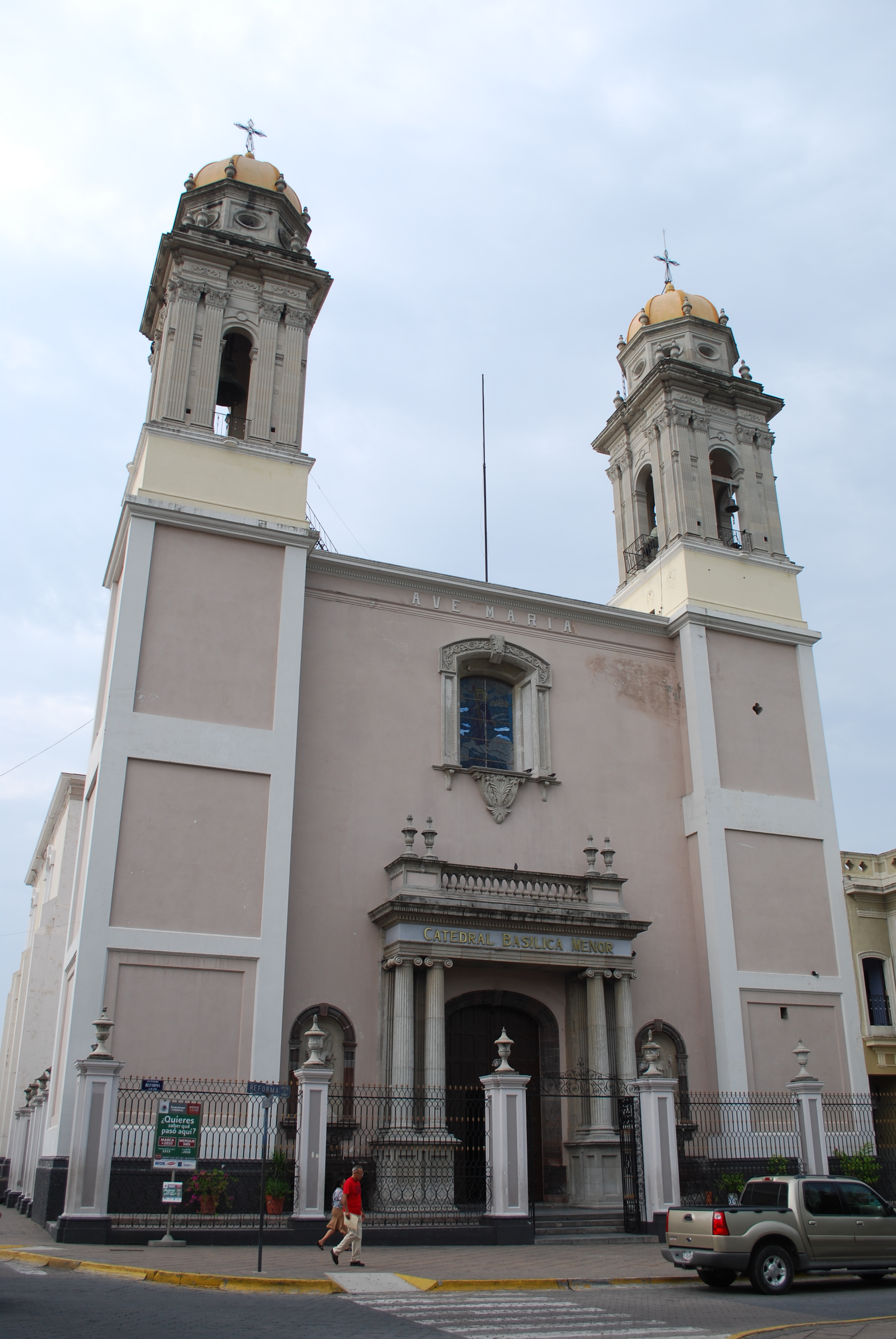
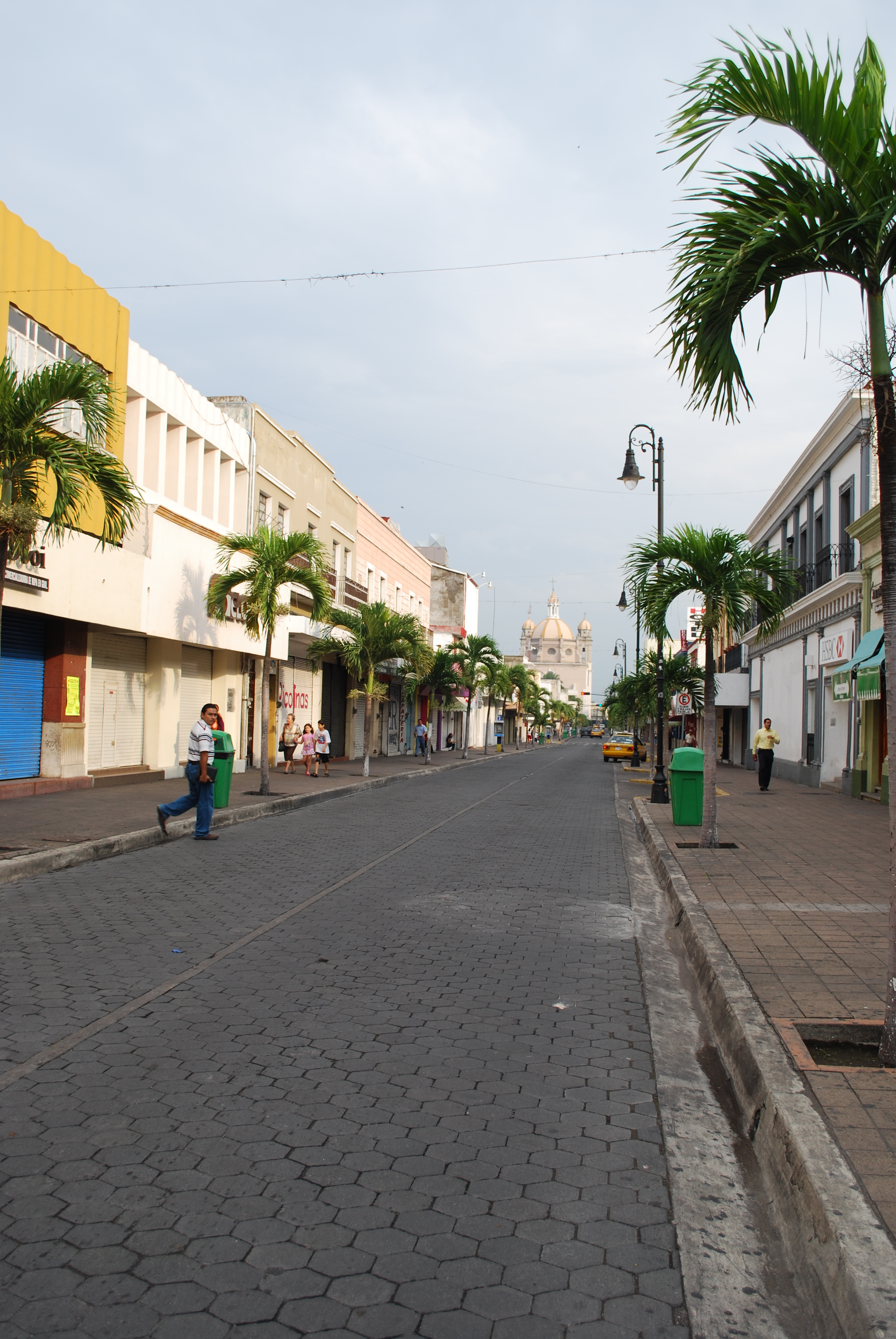
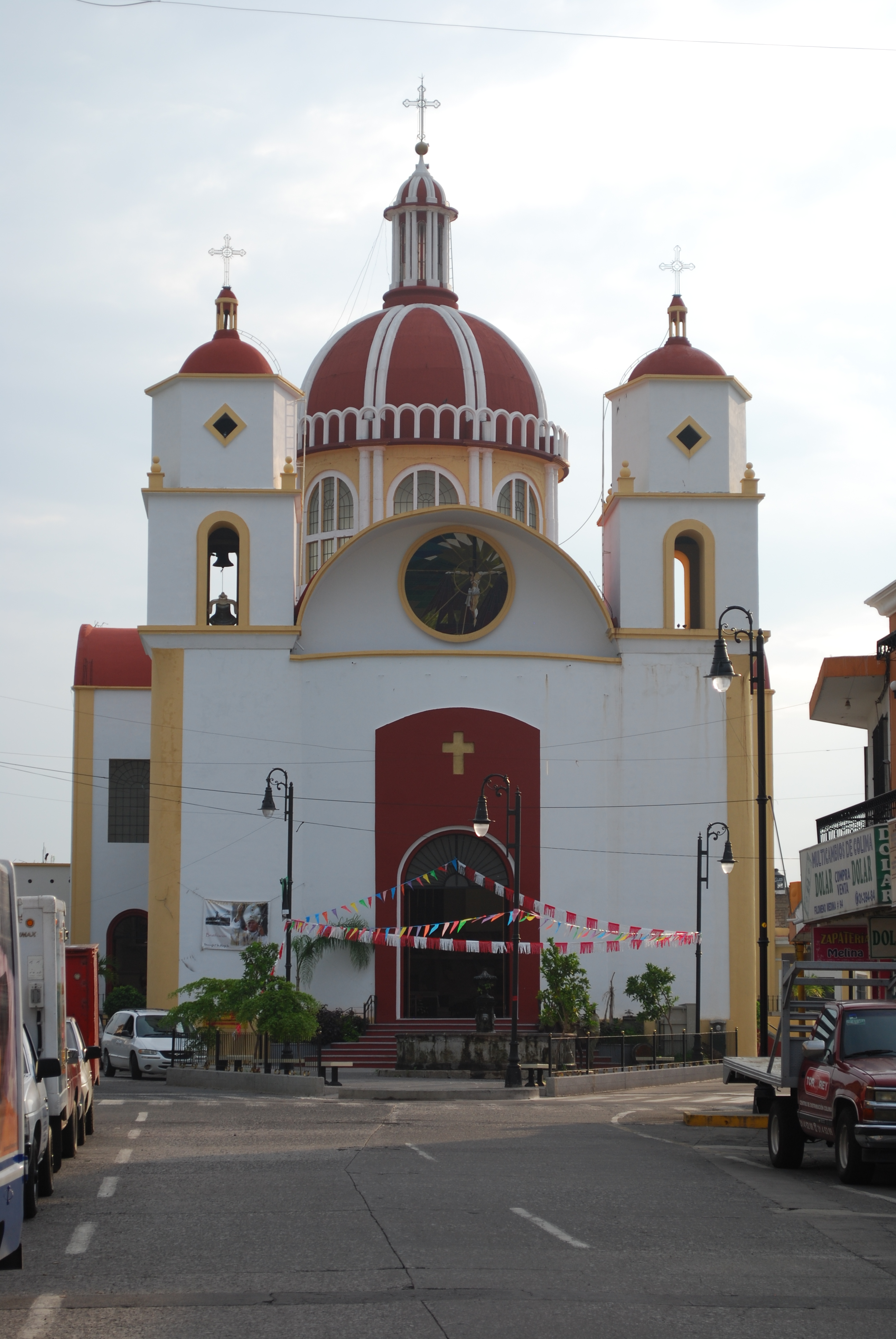
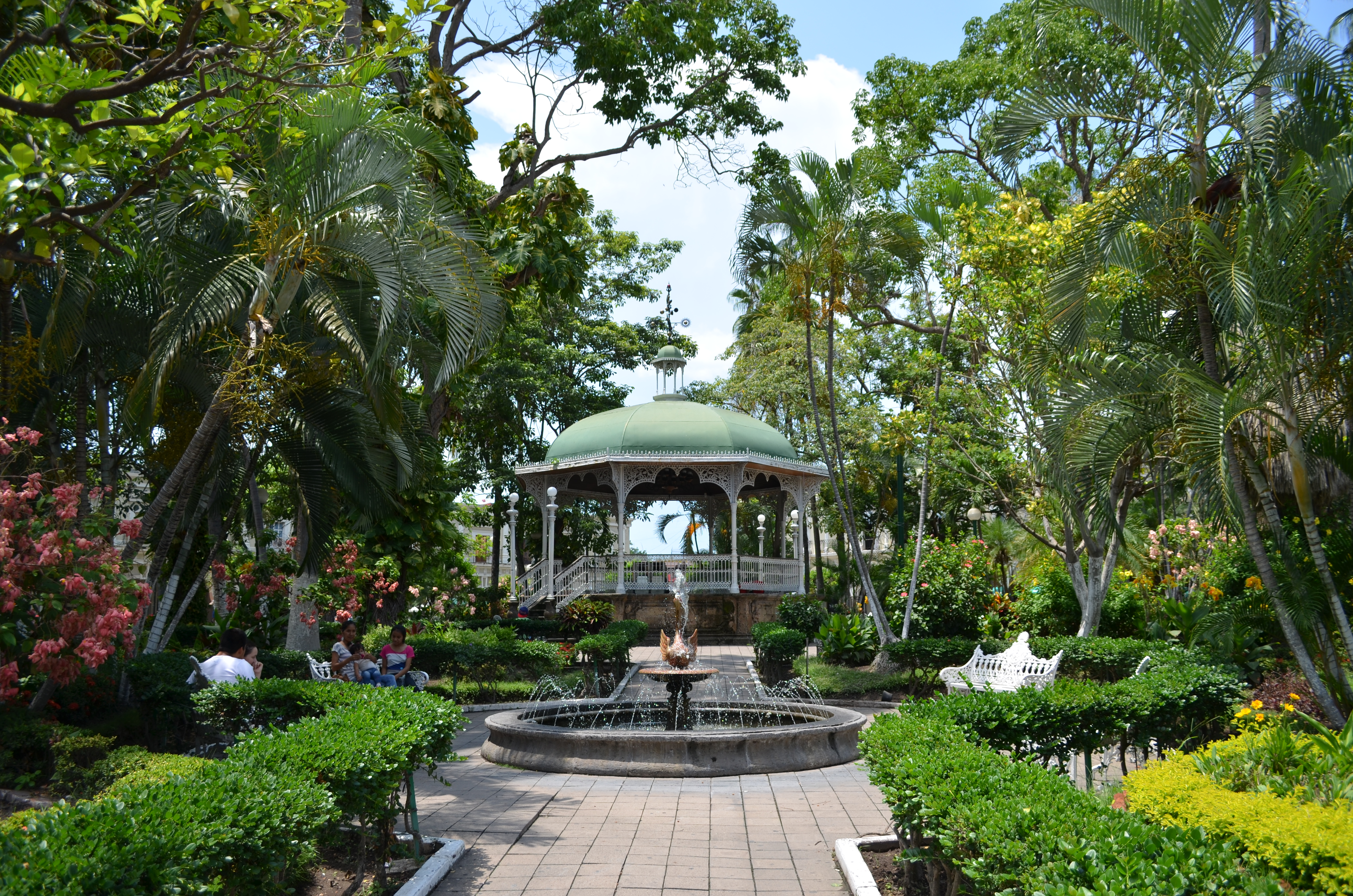
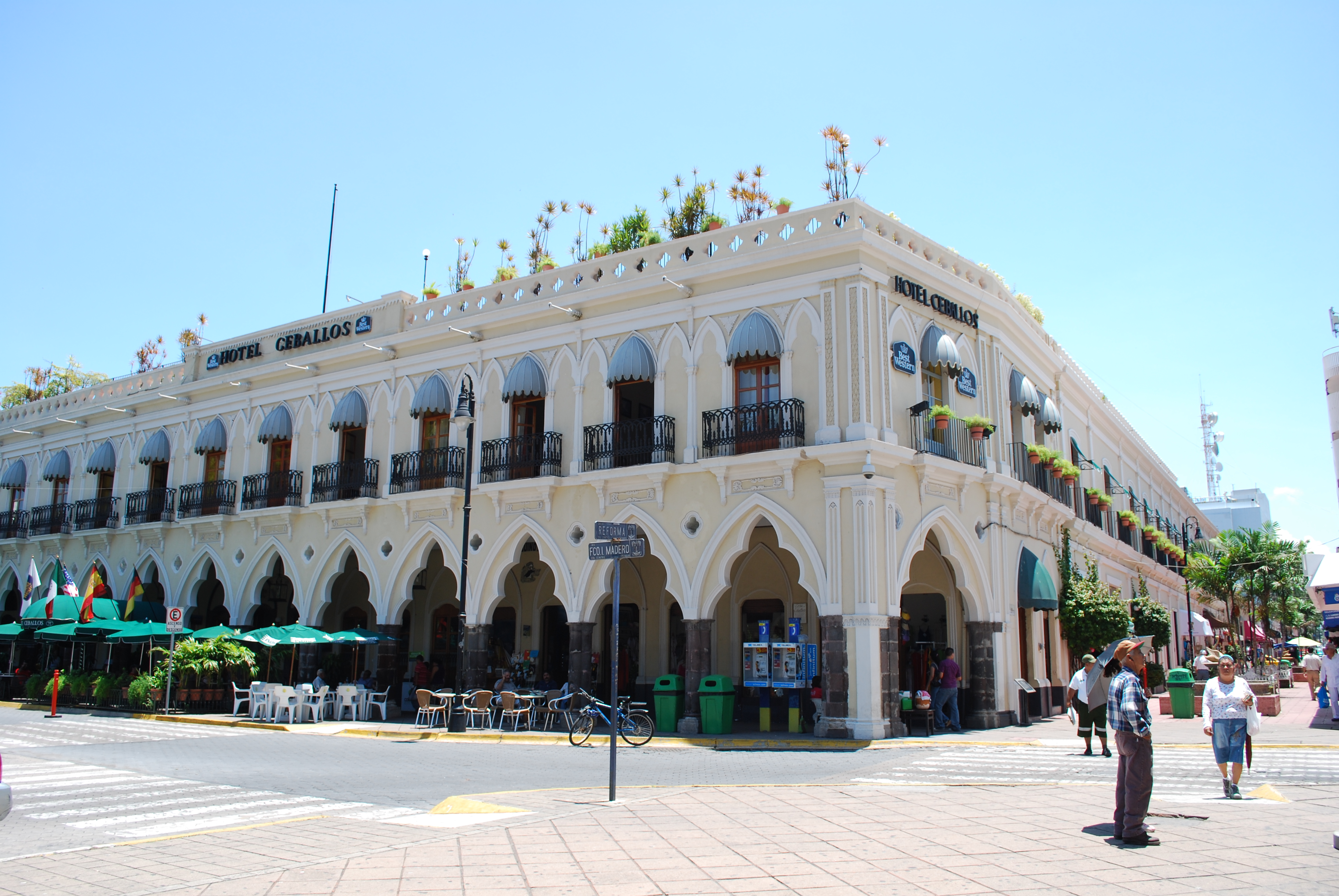
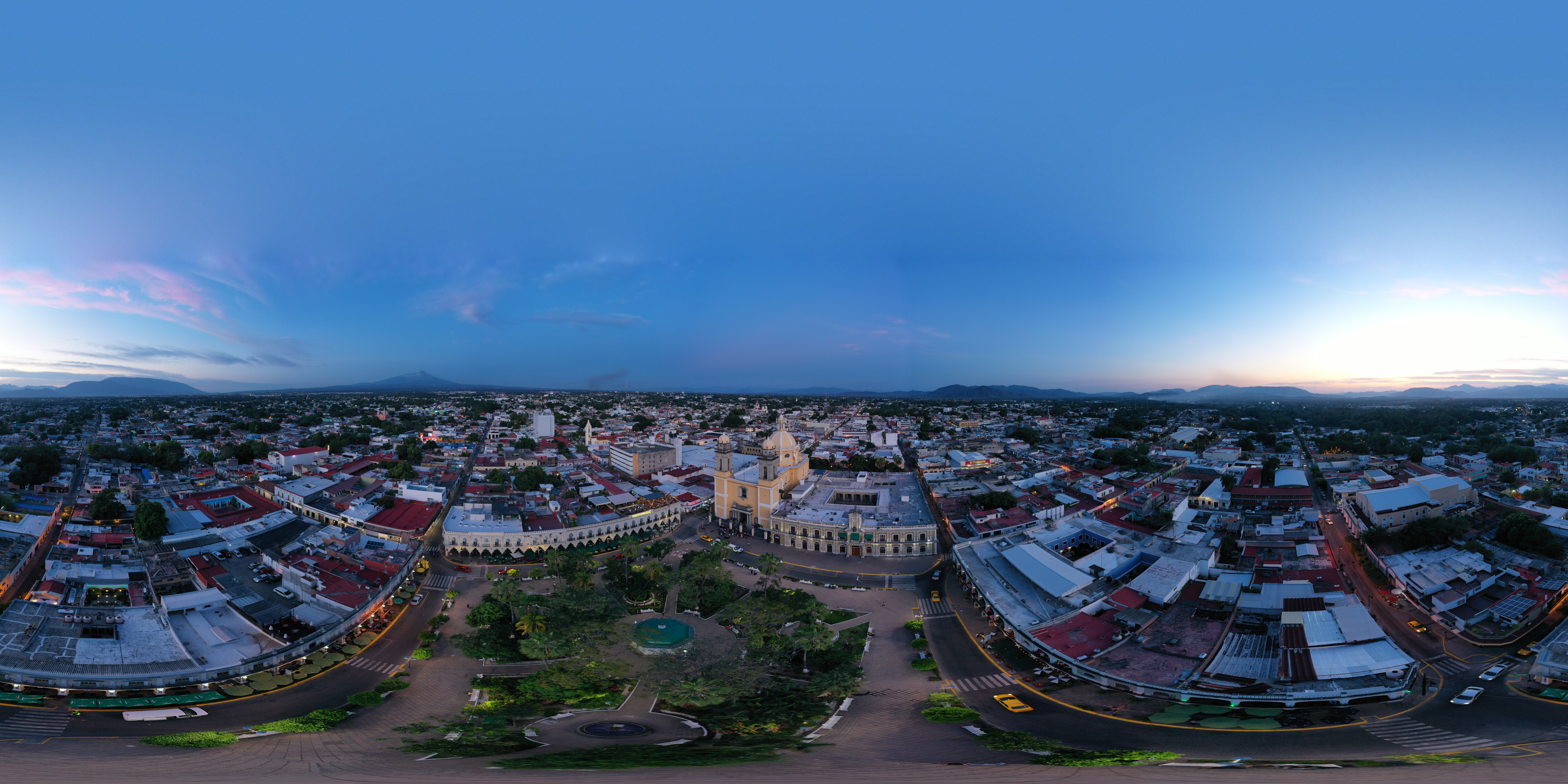
- From top left: Basílica Menor, Madero Street, Precious Blood of Christ Parish, Libertad Garden, Hotel Ceballos, and panoramic of the city

- Coat of arms

- Location within Colima Location within Mexico
- Coordinates: 19°14′36″N 103°43′29″W
- Country: Mexico
- State: Colima
- Municipality: Colima
- Founded: January 20, 1523

Government
  - Municipal president: Riult Rivera Gutiérrez

Area
  - Land: 17 sq mi (45 km^{2})
- Elevation: 1,001–1,804 ft (305–550 m)

Population (2020)
  - Total: 146,965
  - Density: 8,600/sq mi (3,300/km^{2})
  - Metro: 380,575
  - Demonym: Colimense

Metro area GDP (PPP, constant 2015 values)
  - Year: 2023
  - Total: $9.9 billion
  - Per capita: $22,900
- Time zone: UTC−6 (CST)
- Postal code: 28000
- Area code: 312
- Website: www.colima.gob.mx

Colima (Spanish pronunciation: [koˈlima]), located in west−central Mexico, is the capital of the state of the same name and the seat of the municipality of the same name. It is the easternmost and second-largest municipality of Colima, behind Manzanillo. It is located near the Colima volcano, which divides the state from Jalisco. The city of Colima is part of the Colima metropolitan area which also includes Villa de Álvarez and other municipalities.

In 2011, FDI Intelligence, a subsidiary of the Financial Times of London, ranked Colima first in small cities and tenth in Latin America as a place to live. It was evaluated under six categories: economic potential, human resources, cost-benefit ratio, quality of life, infrastructure and favorable business environment. In 2022, however, Colima was ranked as the murder capital of the world with a homicide rate of 182 per 100,000.

== Places ==
The historic center of the city is a square called Jardín Libertad (Liberty Garden). It consists of a kiosk in the center, brought from Belgium in 1891, surrounded by palms and leafy trees and bushes. It often hosts live music on weekends.

The best known hotel of the city is Hotel Ceballos, located just off the main square called Jardín Libertad behind a set of arches. The hotel was begun by the Ceballos family. Hotel Ceballos has an area under and in front of the arches for outdoor dining. Here and in other restaurants in the city, one can try popular dishes such as atole with milk, white pozole, white menudo, tatemado, pipián mole, birria and sopes. On the side of the hotel, there is pedestrian street called Andador Constitución. It retains traditional businesses such as the Joven Don Manuelito ice cream shop, which has been there since 1944. On the street proper, one can see street musicians and artists offering to paint or draw landscapes and portraits. At the end of this street, there is a large handcrafts store funded by a government agency called DIF, which focuses on crafts from the state such as indigenous clothing and ceramic figures, especially those of the Mexican hairless dog also known as the Xoloizcuintle or simply Xolo.

The Colima cathedral is called the Basílica Menor Catedral de Colima. The current structure was built in 1894, but since then it has been renovated various times, often due to earthquake damage. The style is Neoclassical with two towers at the front and a dome. The interior is sparse. The former state government palace is next to the cathedral. It is a two-story buildings in French Neoclassical design. It was finished in 1904 and designed by Lucio Urbe, who also did the cathedral. The façade contains a bell, which is a replica of the one Miguel Hidalgo y Costilla rang in Dolores Hidalgo and a clock brought over from Germany. The building surrounded an inner courtyard marked off by arches. The main stairwell contains mural work done in 1953 by the Coliman artist, Jorge Chávez Carrillo. The park behind the cathedral is Jardin Gregorio Torres Quintero, which contains mango, tabachin (Caesalpinia mexicana) and palm trees along with stands selling handcrafts, novelties and food. Stands here and other places in the city sell a local drink called the "bate" which is thick and somewhat gray in color, made from a toasted seed called chan or chía along with honey or piloncillo. Another traditional drink sold on streets and parks is called "tuba". It is made from the flower of a type of palm tree, with apple, cucumber and peanut bits added.

On one side of Jardín Libertad is the Museo Regional de Historia, or the regional museum for Colima. The building dates from 1848 when it was a private home. Later it became a hotel and in 1988, it opened as a museum. The ground floor has a number of archeological pieces along with a replica of a shaft tomb, which is characteristic of the region. It recreates the burial of several peoples along with their belongings and Mexican hairless dogs (Xolos), which were thought to be guides to the next world. The upper floor contains documents and other objects which narrates the history of the state from the Conquest to the Mexican Revolution .

A short distance from Jardín Libertad is Jardín Hidalgo, dedicated to Miguel Hidalgo y Costilla. This square contains an equatorial sundial which is exact. It was designed by Julio Mendoza and contains explanations in several languages. On one side is located the Temple of San Felipe de Jesús. The main altar of this church contains six niches, with a crucifix at the top. The Del Carmen Chapel is next to it, which is a simple building that contains the image of Our Lady of Mount Carmel with the Infant Jesus in her arms. On another side is the Pinacoteca Universitaria Alfonso Michel which is a museum dedicated to the history of art in Colima. It is dedicated to Colima artist Alfonso Michel who is considered the best of the state from the 20th century, and who focused on cubist and impressionist painting. The building is traditional for the city with its corridors lined by arches. Along with its permanent collection, the museum hosts exhibitions by local artists.

The Piedra Lisa Park is named after a large smooth monolithic stone which was thrown here by the Colima Volcano thousands of years ago. According to local legend, visitors to the city who slide down the smooth face of the stone three times are destined to stay or return. This park is also home to an interactive science museum called the Xoloescuintle.

The Conjunto de la Secretaría de Cultura (Secretary of Culture Complex) is a series of buildings around a central plaza that contains a Juan Soriano sculpture by the name of "El Toro." The three main buildings are the Edificio de Talleres which is for workshops on various artistic disciplines, the Casa de la Cultura Alfonso Michel or Edificio Central, which hosts various exhibitions along with a permanent collection of works by Alfonso Michel and Museo de las Culturas de Occidente María Ahumada de Gómez (María Ahumada de Gómez Museum of Western Cultures. The Ahumada Museum has a large collection of archeological pieces from the region. It divides into two areas. The ground floor is dedicated to the history of the state divided into phases. The upper floor is dedicated to the various pre-Hispanic culture of the area showing various aspects of their lives such as work, clothing, architecture, religion and art.

The Palacio Legislativa y de Justicia (Legislative and Justice Palace) is the work of architects Xavier Yarto and Alberto Yarza. It is a modern design. Its interior contains a mural entitled "La Universialidad de la Justicia" by Gabriel Portillo del Toro.

The Museo Universitario de Artes Populares María Teresa Pomar is not only dedicated to the region's handicrafts and folk art, it also has exhibitions related to the area's popular festivals and traditions. The collection includes festival costumes, toys, masks, cooking utensils, metal miniatures, wood objects, pottery and fiber crafts.

== Colima Municipality ==
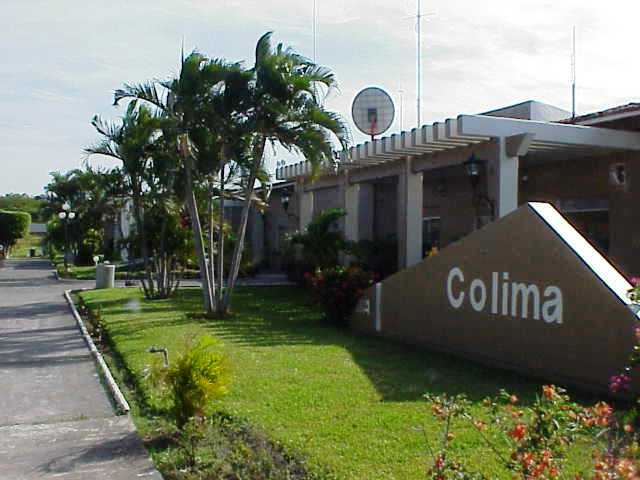
Miguel de la Madrid airport

As municipal seat, the city of Colima is the local government for 145 communities, with the most important being Colima, Tepames, Piscila, El Chanal and Los Asmoles. The only urban community is Colima with a high population density with almost all involved in commerce, services and some industry. These communities cover a territory of 668.2km2 and are bordered by the municipalities of Cuauhtémoc, Ixtlahuacán, Tecomán, Coquimatlán and Villa de Álvarez with the state of Jalisco to the east and the state of Michoacán to the southeast. The municipal government consists of a municipal president, an officer called a síndico and eleven representatives called regidores.

The municipality contains about one-quarter of the state's total population. About 92% of the municipality's population lives in the city proper. (123,543 in the city versus 8,730 in the rural areas as of 2005). As of 2005, only 574 people spoke an indigenous language, with 239 of them living in the city proper. Over 95% of the population is Catholic, with about two percent following a Protestant or Evangelical form of Christianity. As of 2010, the municipality had a total population of 146,904, and covers an area of 1,668.3 km^{2} (644.1 sq mi).

The city has radio stations, two broadcast television stations (channels 5 and 11), cable television services, and eight newspapers. The main highways that connect the municipality to the outside include Highway 4 to Manzanillo and Guadalajara and Highway 110 to Jiquilpan, Michoacán. Other modes of transportation include the Guadalajara-Colima-Manzanillo rail line, the Central Camionera and Central Suburbana de Autobuses bus stations and the regional airport Miguel de la Madrid Airport .

== Economy ==
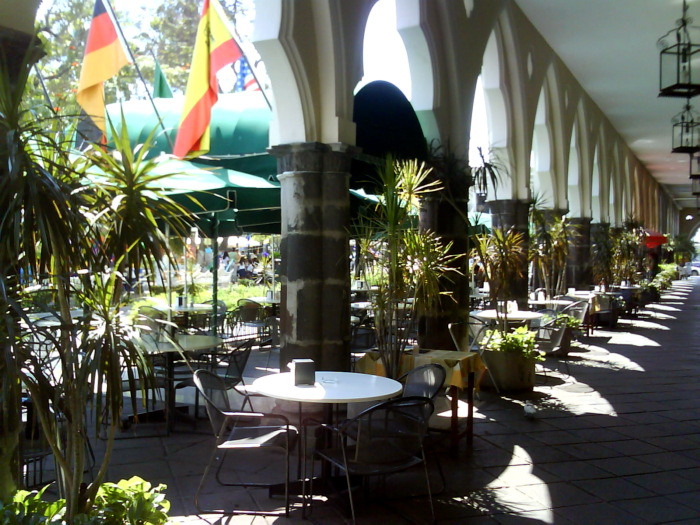
Central Hall of Colima.

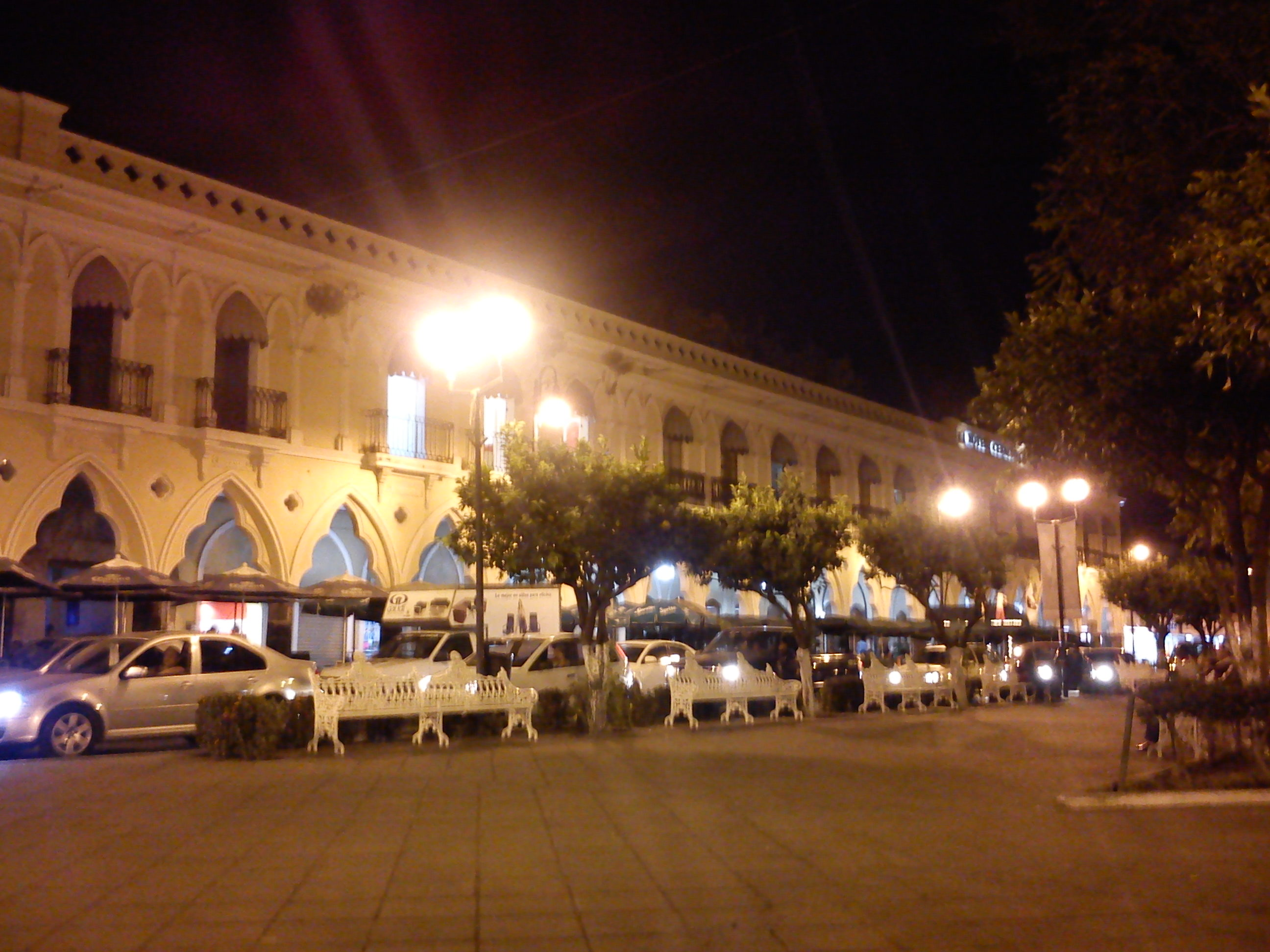
Portal Medellín, Colima.

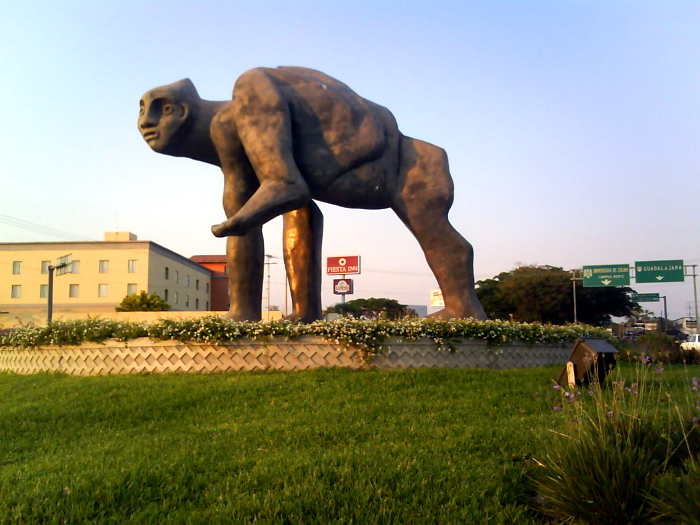
Figure Obscene Monument.

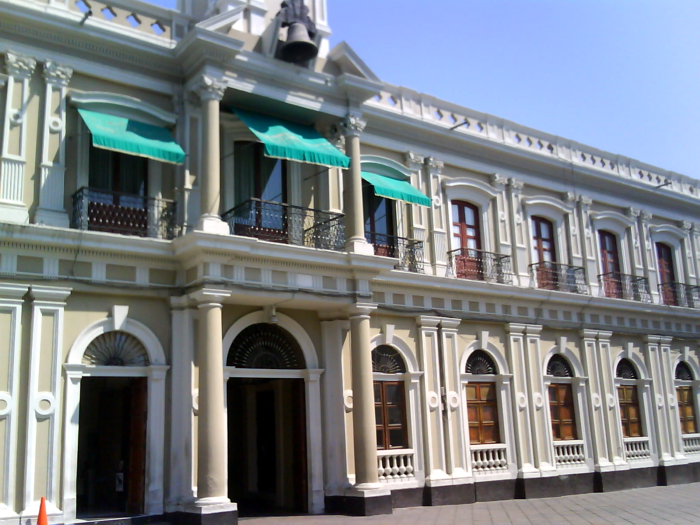
Government Palace.

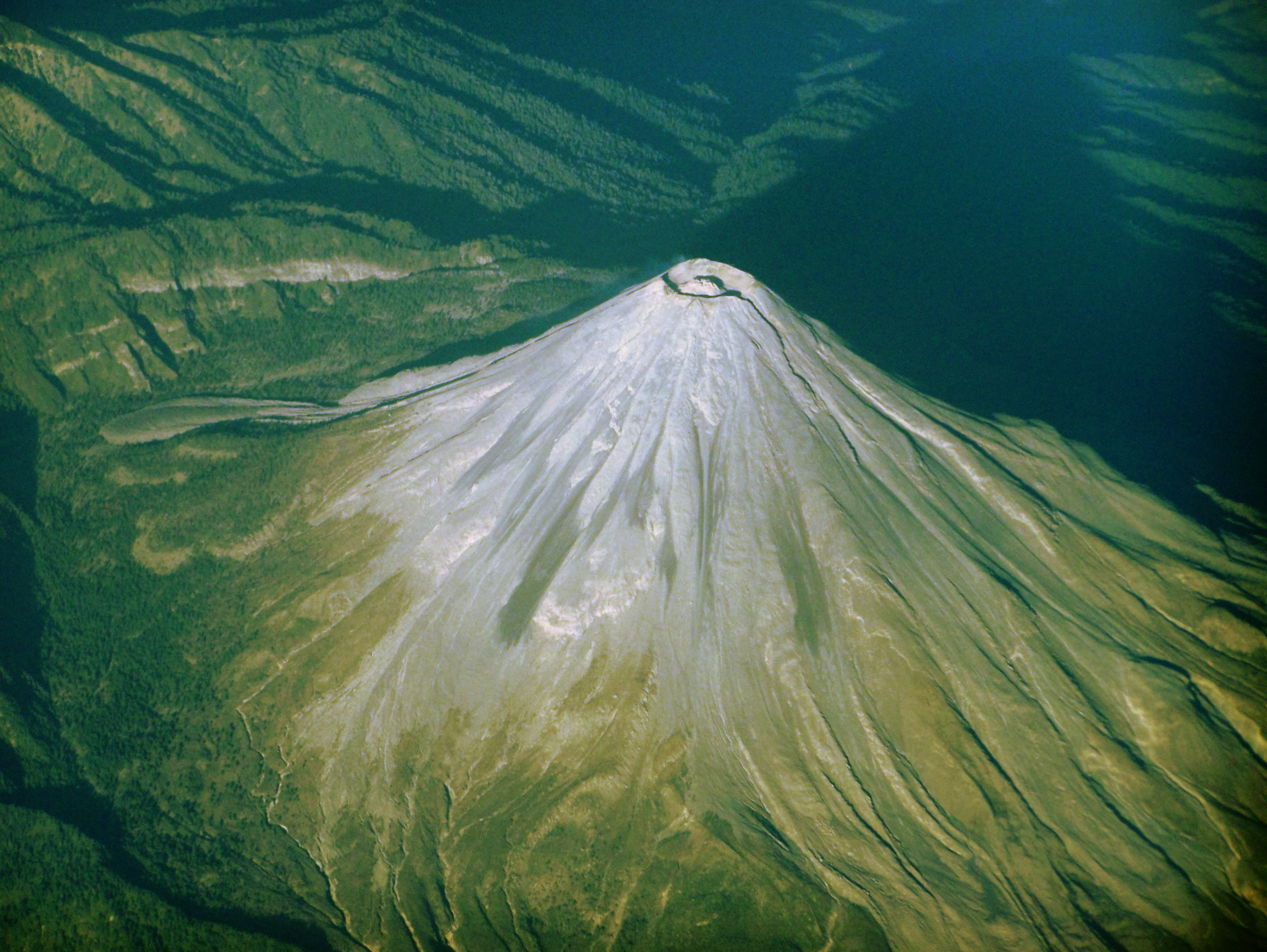
Colima Volcano.

The city of Colima is the economic center of the state. Outside in the small communities of the municipality, agriculture is still the most important economic activity. The city has been ranked as first as liveable small city in Mexico and tenth in Latin America by FDI Intelligence. It is one of seventy-one urban areas and 308 municipalities that contribute over eighty percent of Mexico's GDP. It is ranked twelfth in competitiveness. Its main competitive advantage is reliable and objective local laws with its weakness being sustainable use of the local environment. The working population of the municipality is 51,509, with 3,145 working in agriculture, 10,820 in industry, mining and construction and 35,809 in commerce and services as of 2009. A study by the University of Colima concluded that the municipality is the most competitive in the state and one of the most competitive in the center west of Mexico. Two economic advantages the municipality has are its well development commerce and services sector and its low rate of unemployment. One main disadvantage is its lack of developed technology sector, with most businesses dedicated to basic commodities. Others include high bureaucratic costs, crime rate, over exploitation of aquifers and problems with waste management, especially hazardous materials.

Agriculture is exclusively practiced outside of the city proper, by the small rural communities which still depend on it economically, along with some mining and fishing. The municipality has a total of 70,000 hectares dedicated to agricultural production, which is over ten percent of the total. Most soils in the municipality are fertile. Most irrigated agriculture occurs in the west of the municipality on the Los Asmoles, Las Golondrinas and Los Ortinces mesas. Main crops include corn, rice, melons, animal feed, sugar cane and limes. Other important crops include sorghum, tomatoes, tomatillos, beans, peanuts, mangos, tamarind, coconut, papaya, agave and bananas. Livestock mostly consists of domestic fowl followed by cattle, horses, sheep, goats and pigs. Agriculture employs just over nine percent of the population.

Except for some limestone at the Cerro de Galindo, there are no exploitable minerals in the municipality. Industry is limited to food processing and packaging, especially of rice. There is also some production of oils, soaps and sweets. This sector of the economy employs just over twenty percent of the population.

About 68 percent of the population is employed in commerce and services. Colima is one of the state's main commercial centers and is the major distribution center for goods destined for local consumption. The municipality has five traditional fixed markets, eight department stores, ten tianguis markets, one flea market and a very large number of small, independent retail stores. Despite being the capital, the city is not the state's main tourist attraction, eclipsed by Manzanillo and Comala, as it lacks major cultural and historical sites. It is one of the state's main commerce and distribution centers, with over two-thirds of the population employed in commerce and services within the city proper. The main economic activities in the city are commerce and services, including tourism. However, the city lacks major cultural and heritage sites, with makes it lag behind Manzanillo and the small town of Comala as a tourist attraction.

== History ==
=== Name ===
The name comes from the Nahuatl "Coliman" which refers to the pre-Hispanic dominion of the area. It divides into syllables referring to the Colima Volcano, also called "grandfather" and the word for hand or dominion. This has been interpreted to mean "place conquered by our grandfathers" or "dominion of the old god or god of fire", referring to the volcano.

The seal for the city was chosen in 1986 from a number submitted as part of a competition. The chosen seal contains fields of red to symbolize the hot climates and local flora such as bougainvilleas, pitayas, and palm trees. Blue represents water on which appears an image of King Collimán. Other images include an open book (education), the two volcanoes of the state, foliage called lambrequins and Mexican hairless dogs (xolos).

The city's nickname is "Ciudad de las Palmeras" or City of the Palms.

=== Colonial era ===
The Spanish colonial settlement of Colima was founded on 15 July 1523 at a location now known as Caxitlán, near present-day Tecomán. This settlement was founded by Gonzalo de Sandoval under orders from Hernán Cortés in order to control the newly conquered Central Mexico region. Due to disease, the settlement was moved on 20 January 1527 to the current location with the name of Villa de San Sebastián Colima. It was the eighth settlement founded by the Spanish in the Viceroyalty of New Spain. Hernán Cortés visited the settlement in 1535.

=== 19th century ===
Miguel Hidalgo y Costilla was in charge of the parish of Colima in 1792. This would lead to a friendship with Father José Antonio Díaz, who would be an insurgent leader in the area during the Mexican War of Independence. The Battle of el Llano de Santa Juana took place on 12 July 1811, with the city taken by the insurgents under Ignacio Sandoval and El Lego Gallaga. Insurgents under José Antonio Torres and Rafael Arteaga arrived to the city, bringing twenty Spanish hostages from Guadalajara. Eleven would be killed but nine were saved by Francisco Ramírez de Oliva. When royalist troops retook the city in March 1811, about three hundred insurgents and sympathizers were executed.

The city under Anastacio Brizuela swore allegiance to the Plan of Iguala in June 1821. When Independence was achieved in 1821, what is now the state of Colima still belonged to the province of Guadalajara. In September 1821, the municipalities of Colima and Zapotlán were ordered to negotiate their borders by the department of Guadalajara. During these negotiations, Zapotlán ceded Tonila to Colima, and Colima ceded Tecaltlán and Xilotlán to Zapotlán.

Colima and the territory it controlled were loyal to Iturbide. However, since it was then part of the territory of Guadalajara, it was forced to support the republic when it was proclaimed in 1823. The city and territory was made part of the state of Jalisco when it was established, with the city remaining the capital of the Colima province. The city tried to gain independence from Jalisco as a new state, but was denied. Anastacio Brizuela continued to work from 1823 to 1824 to separate the city and its province to make it a separate state. This occurred on 4 October 1824, separating from the state of Jalisco. However, this independence was not stable with the area passing back and forth between independent state and province of Jalisco. However, whether state or province, the city remained the seat of government for the area.

In 1824, the town of Colima was recognized as a city. The annual city fair was authorized in 1825 to occur for fifteen days in March.

When part of Jalisco, the city had problems because its political orientation was different from that of Guadalajara. It was also far from where political decisions were made, impeding economic development. This lack of support from Guadalajara kept ambitions for a distinct state alive, with city first petitioning for more support from Guadalajara, but not receiving it. The state and capital were formally recognized in the 1857 Constitution with Manuel Alvarez as the first constitutional governor.

The city hosted the government of Benito Juárez from March to April 1858.

During the French Intervention in Mexico, the state was taken over by those loyal to Maximilian I, reducing the state to an administrative department. Insurgent General Ramón Corona took the city on 31 January 1867 as part of efforts to restore the Mexican Republic.

The Manzanillo-Colima railroad was inaugurated in 1889.

=== Mexican Revolution to the present ===
Francisco I. Madero arrived to the city to campaign in 1909. After civil war broke out, forces loyal to this leader entered the city on 18 May 1911 under Eugenio Aviña. Insurgents under Juan José Ríos took control of the city between 1914 and 1916, beginning a series of social and economic reforms. Venustiano Carranza was in the city in 1916. While there, he was invited by Juan José Ríos to open the public library and formalize the state's Red Battalion.

Since then, most of the city's history has revolved around its growth. The population is expected to grow by 38,000 during the 2010s, with job growth of 14,000 and 44,000 more cars on the road. Problems that the city faces now include transit problems, unregulated growth, deteriorating road conditions and street lighting, the lack of public transportation, lack of public security and insufficient water treatment. The city generates eighty-seven tons of garbage every day. The municipal landfill receives about 175 tons of garbage each day. As of 2010, for every 1,000 residents, there are 400 vehicles, ranking Colima third in the ratio of cars to people, down from first only a year earlier.

Unchecked urban sprawl, especially in the north and south of the city is a major environmental problem. Most of the buildings in the north are subdivisions, which are only partially occupied. The Centro Universario de Gestión Ambiental at the University of Colima claims that there is apathy to environmental issues on the part of various levels of government.

== Geography ==
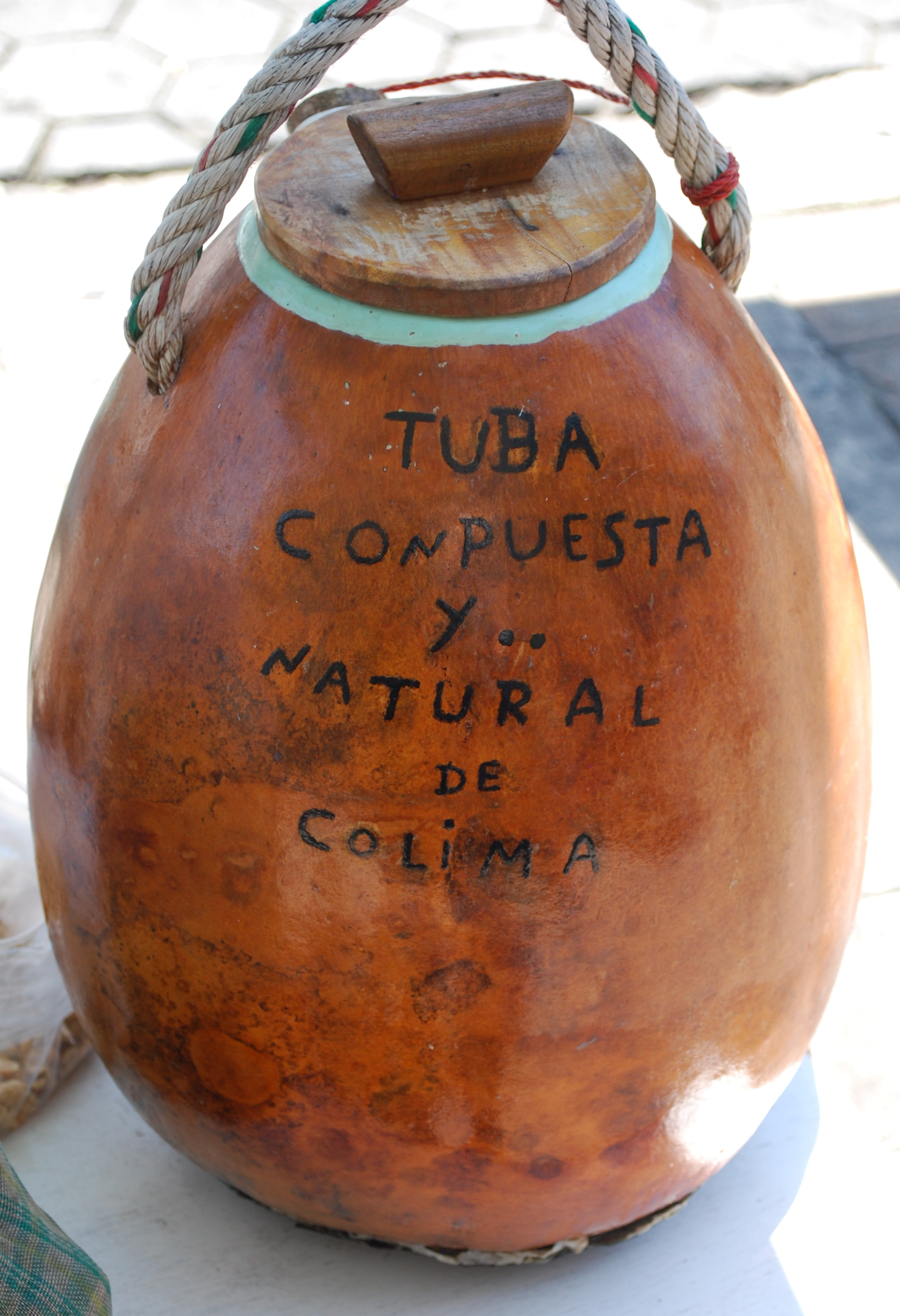
Traditional container for a drink called "tuba" or palm wine made from the flower from a type of palm tree.

Most of the municipality is located in the Valley of Colima. About half of the municipality has rugged, mountainous terrain, most of which is on the south and southeastern sides but with an average altitude of only 550 masl. These areas are part of the areas belonging to the Colima Volcano and a set of mountains called the Cordillera Costera del Sur, which is part of the Sierra Madre del Sur, especially that of the north and northwest to the Cerro de los Gallos mesa. These mountains separate the area from the ocean.

On the north and northwest, there is a mesa area called the Cerro de los Gallos. Local peaks include Los Mezcales, Los Gallos, El Alcomún, Rincón de Galindo, Pistola Grande, Piscila, El Agostadero, La Salvia, Cerro Pelón, Piedra Ancha, Higuera Panda, Amarradero, La Yerbabuena, Peña Blanca, La Cebadilla, Tinajas, El Salto, Los Volcancillos, La Palmera, El Camichín, El Achoque, La Siempreviva, El Borrego and Copala.

Important rivers in the municipality include El Colima, Salado and the Naranjo or Coahuayana. Feeding into these rivers are streams such as El Zarco, El Astillero Salitrillos, Cardona, Colomitos and El Chico. During the rainy season, the following flow: El Manrique, La Estancia, La Cañada, Tepames, Tinajas and La Palmera.

The climate is semi-humid with rains in the summer, with an annual average temperature of between 24 and 26 °C. One exception to this is a section near the Cuauhtémoc border where the temperature is between 22 and 24 °C and annual rainfall is between 1,000 and 1,300 mm (39.4 and 51.2 in) as opposed to the 800 to 1,000 mm (31.5 to 39.4 in) average for the rest of the municipality. Another exception are the communities of Estampilla and Las Tunas, where the climate is drier and hotter, with an average temperature of 26 to 28 °C (79 to 82 °F) and an annual precipitation of between 600 and 700 mm (23.6 and 27.6 in).

In the center, west and southeast, the dominant type of natural vegetation is low growth rainforest. About seventy-five percent of these trees shed their leaves during the dry season. The southeast also contains areas with medium-growth rainforest, which also is deciduous. Most of this forest is near the Ixtlahuacán border. In the highest elevations, south and southeast of the Tepames community, there are some localized forests of holm oak.

The growth of the city in recent decades has put severe stress on the local environment, with subdivisions clearing areas of tropical vegetation, and large quantities of garbage and wastewater improperly disposed. The Manrique River is considered the dirtiest in the state, with an estimated eight to nine tons of garbage within it. However, there have been well run reforestation programs in the municipality.

=== Climate ===
Colima has a tropical savanna climate, with consistently high temperatures and extremely dry conditions from November to May followed by heavy rainfall from June to October. The city is sometimes affected by hurricanes, which can bring up to 140 millimetres (5.5 in) of rain per day and lengthy periods of heavy rain.

Climate data for Colima (1991–2020)
Month	Jan	Feb	Mar	Apr	May	Jun	Jul	Aug	Sep	Oct	Nov	Dec	Year
Record high °C (°F)	38.2 (100.8)	39.2 (102.6)	39.8 (103.6)	42.5 (108.5)	42.0 (107.6)	41.0 (105.8)	40.4 (104.7)	39.0 (102.2)	39.5 (103.1)	41.0 (105.8)	39.4 (102.9)	40.5 (104.9)	42.5 (108.5)
Mean daily maximum °C (°F)	32.3 (90.1)	33.0 (91.4)	33.9 (93.0)	35.1 (95.2)	35.8 (96.4)	34.8 (94.6)	34.0 (93.2)	33.7 (92.7)	32.6 (90.7)	33.1 (91.6)	33.3 (91.9)	32.5 (90.5)	33.7 (92.7)
Daily mean °C (°F)	24.1 (75.4)	24.5 (76.1)	25.1 (77.2)	26.2 (79.2)	27.7 (81.9)	28.4 (83.1)	27.9 (82.2)	27.6 (81.7)	27.1 (80.8)	27.0 (80.6)	26.1 (79.0)	24.7 (76.5)	26.4 (79.5)
Mean daily minimum °C (°F)	16.0 (60.8)	16.1 (61.0)	16.3 (61.3)	17.3 (63.1)	19.6 (67.3)	21.9 (71.4)	21.7 (71.1)	21.6 (70.9)	21.5 (70.7)	20.9 (69.6)	18.9 (66.0)	16.8 (62.2)	19.0 (66.2)
Record low °C (°F)	7.5 (45.5)	8.0 (46.4)	8.0 (46.4)	7.0 (44.6)	10.0 (50.0)	14.0 (57.2)	17.0 (62.6)	15.0 (59.0)	13.0 (55.4)	13.0 (55.4)	11.0 (51.8)	9.0 (48.2)	7.0 (44.6)
Average precipitation mm (inches)	26.8 (1.06)	15.1 (0.59)	6.7 (0.26)	0.0 (0.0)	8.3 (0.33)	121.0 (4.76)	163.2 (6.43)	187.8 (7.39)	196.3 (7.73)	100.7 (3.96)	22.6 (0.89)	7.8 (0.31)	856.3 (33.71)
Average precipitation days (≥ 0.1 mm)	1.8	1.1	0.5	0.2	1.5	12.9	17.9	19.6	18.4	8.2	2.4	1.2	85.7
Average relative humidity (%)	56	53	51	50	51	59	66	64	69	65	57	52	58
Mean monthly sunshine hours	233	240	268	252	263	185	165	184	161	207	229	213	2,600
Source 1: Servicio Meteorológico Nacional (humidity 1981–2000)
Source 2: Deutscher Wetterdienst (sun, 1961–1990) (Note: Station ID for Colima is 76658 Use this station ID to locate the sunshine duration)

== Government ==
=== Municipal presidents ===
Municipal president	Term	Political party
Melesio Espinoza Larios	1949-1951	PRI
Rodolfo Chávez Carrillo	1952-1954	PRI
Ricardo Guzmán Nava	1955	PRI
J. Roberto Levy Rendón	1956	PRI
Jorge Morales Pico	1956-1958	PRI
Antonio Ramos Salido	1959-1961	PRI
Abel López Llerenas	1962-1964	PRI
Alfonso Rosales Santana	1964	PRI
Octavio Urzúa Quiroz	1965-1967	PRI
Leonel Ramírez García	1968-1970	PRI
José Juárez Martínez	1970	PRI
Arturo Noriega Pizano	1971-1973	PRI
Arnoldo Vogel Carrillo	1973	PRI
Eduardo M. Herrera García	1974-1977	PRI
Roberto Pizano Saucedo	1978-1980	PRI
Carlos Salazar Preciado	1980-1983	PRI
Carlos Vázquez Oldenbourg	1983-1985	PRI
José Luis Santana Rodríguez	1986-1988	PRI
Agustín Martel	1988	PRI
Carlos de la Madrid Virgen	1989-1991	PRI
Jaime Morales Fernández	1991	PRI
Jesús Orozco Alfaro	1992-1994	PRI
Oscar Luis Verduzco	1994	PRI
Héctor Arturo Velasco Villa	1995-1997	PRI
Carlos Vázquez Oldenbourg	1998	PRD
Enrique Michel Ruiz	2000-2003	PAN
Leoncio Alfonso Moran Sánchez	2003-2006	PAN
Mario Anguiano Moreno	2006-2009	PRI
José Ignacio Peralta Sánchez	2009-2012	PRI PNA
Federico Rangel Lozano	2012-2015	PRI PNA
Héctor Insúa García	2015-2018	PAN
Leoncio Alfonso Morán Sánchez	2019-2021	MC
Elia Margarita Moreno González	2021-2024	PAN PRI PRD; Coalition "It Goes for Colima"
Riult Rivera Gutiérrez	2024-	PAN PRI

== Gastronomy ==
Most of the traditional foods of the region of Colima are based out of corn, local fruits, pork and seafood found on the coasts near the region. Some of the most popular and representative dishes of Colima include: "Sopitos" (small deep fried tortillas topped with ground beef, shredded cabbage, onion, and cheese bathed in the juices where the meat has been cooked); "Sopes Gordos" which are medium-size, thick tortillas that are slightly pan fried, topped with refried beans and a variety meats which can include pork tenderloin, pork ribs, pork rinds or shredded chicken; "Tostadas" are larger tortillas that are thinned, deep fried and then topped with the same variety of meats as the "Sopes Gordos"; these two last dishes will also include shredded cabbage, onions, fresh tomatoes, a thin meat sauce, and shredded cheese as a garnishing.

A local variety of "Pozole" is also extremely popular as a lunch or dinner meal. Pozole in Colima is made with a variety of pork meats and is typically served dry (no broth), although you can easily also find the variety that will include broth.

Some other popular dishes include "Tatemado" -pork meat marinated in coconut vinegar and cooked with a thick, mild and very flavorful chilly sauce. "Pepena" - Cooked entrails from either cow or pork. "Coachala" -Ground corn, cooked with shredded chicken. The local varieties of "Tamales" such as "Pata de Mula", which literally translates to mule's feet -filled with spicy beans and covered in corn leaves or "tamales de elote" - Filled with sweet, tender corn; "Ceniza" - Similar to Pata de Mula, but less spicy, larger and less dry.

The neighboring town of Comala characterizes itself for its wide variety of milk products and local varieties of fresh or dry cheeses, as well as for the production of sweet breads and pastries.

Colima is also known for its wide variety of fresh seafood restaurants. Some of the traditional seafood dishes include "Ceviche" - Ground raw fish cooked in a marinade of lime juice, garnished with shredded carrots, chopped cilantro, onions, tomatoes, jalapeño peppers and served on top of a deep fried tortilla. "Pescado a la talla" - A whole fish (typically red snapper) cut open and covered with a variety of chopped vegetables, and cooked wrapped in a banana leaf and grilled on top of hot coals.

There are three drinks that are very characteristics of the region: "Tejuino" - Thick, refreshing drink prepared with corn masa and molasses and it is served with a lot of ice, salt and lime. "Tuba" - A drink brought from the Philippines, is the sap from the coconut tree, which is traditionally extracted making cuts at the top of the palm tree right at the base where the coconuts grow, and it is usually topped with peanuts, almonds or freshly chopped fruits. "Bate" - This drink is made with chia seeds and it is served with molasses. "Ponche de Comala" - This is the only alcoholic drink that it is traditionally made in the region, and it is produced in the neighboring town of Comala; You can find different varieties of Ponche which can be water-based or milk-based. Water-based Ponche include pomegranate, prune, guayabilla, and the milk variety include flavors such as coffee, almonds, among others. To prepare Ponche, locally produced mezcal is used, which is locally known as "Tuxca".

The region is also known for its interesting variety of sweets based out of coconut which are known as "Cocadas" or "Alfajores". Sweets made out of tamarind, pineapple or guava as well as dehydrated plantain are also very popular.

== Archaeology ==
There are two main archeological zones in the municipality called La Campana and El Chanal. La Campana is about fifteen minutes outside of the city and is distinguished by a mound in the shape of a bell, which gives it the name. The site covers an area of about fifty hectares with only one percent explored. The site is also known for a construction style which uses rounded river stones and numerous burials.

El Chanal reached its height between 1,000 and 1,400 over an area of 120 hectares. The site has evidence of the extensive use of obsidian and metals such as copper and gold. Constructions at the site include a Mesoamerican ballcourt, the Plaza of the Altars, the Plaza of Day and Night and the Plaza of Time. Stairwells on pyramid bases often have glyphs similar to those found in central Mexico which may have a calendar function.

== Education ==
The average number of years of schooling is 9.49 years, above the state average of 8.6, with men having only a slight advantage over women. (.3 years) However, there is a large gap between those in the city, with an average of 9.7 years versus those in the rural areas with an average of 5.9. The municipality has public and private schools that offer education from preschool to postgraduate. The municipality has 77 preschools, 104 primary schools, 34 secondary schools, 14 high schools and three technical schools.

University level education is available from the University of Colima, ITESM-Colima and UAP. There is also vocational training available through CONALEP and CEDART.

3.5% of the population in the city is illiterate versus 11.6% in the rural areas, for an average of about five percent.

== Transportation ==
Lic. Miguel de la Madrid Airport serves the city, it is located 22 km outside the capital, in the municipality of Cuauhtémoc. Most of the Colima airport flights go to Mexico City, with about 100,000 passengers going through the terminal in 2009. Colima is linked to Guadalajara by a four-lane toll highway (Highway 54D).

Two companies manage the public transport: SINTRA (Sistema Integral de Transporte S.A. de C.V.) and SOCACOVA (Sociedad Cooperativa de Autotransportes Colima-Villa de Álvarez S.C.L.). There is also a government-run taxi company.

There are also two bus terminals, Terminal de Transportes de Colima S.A., goes to major destinations across the state and the country, and a rural bus terminal that goes to the nearest towns.

== International relations ==
=== Twin towns – Sister cities ===
Colima is twinned with:

- Norman, United States, since 2009

== Notable people ==
- Miguel de la Madrid (1934-2012), president of Mexico from 1982-1988
