= Municipalities of Colima =

List of municipalities of Mexican state

Map of Mexico with Colima highlighted

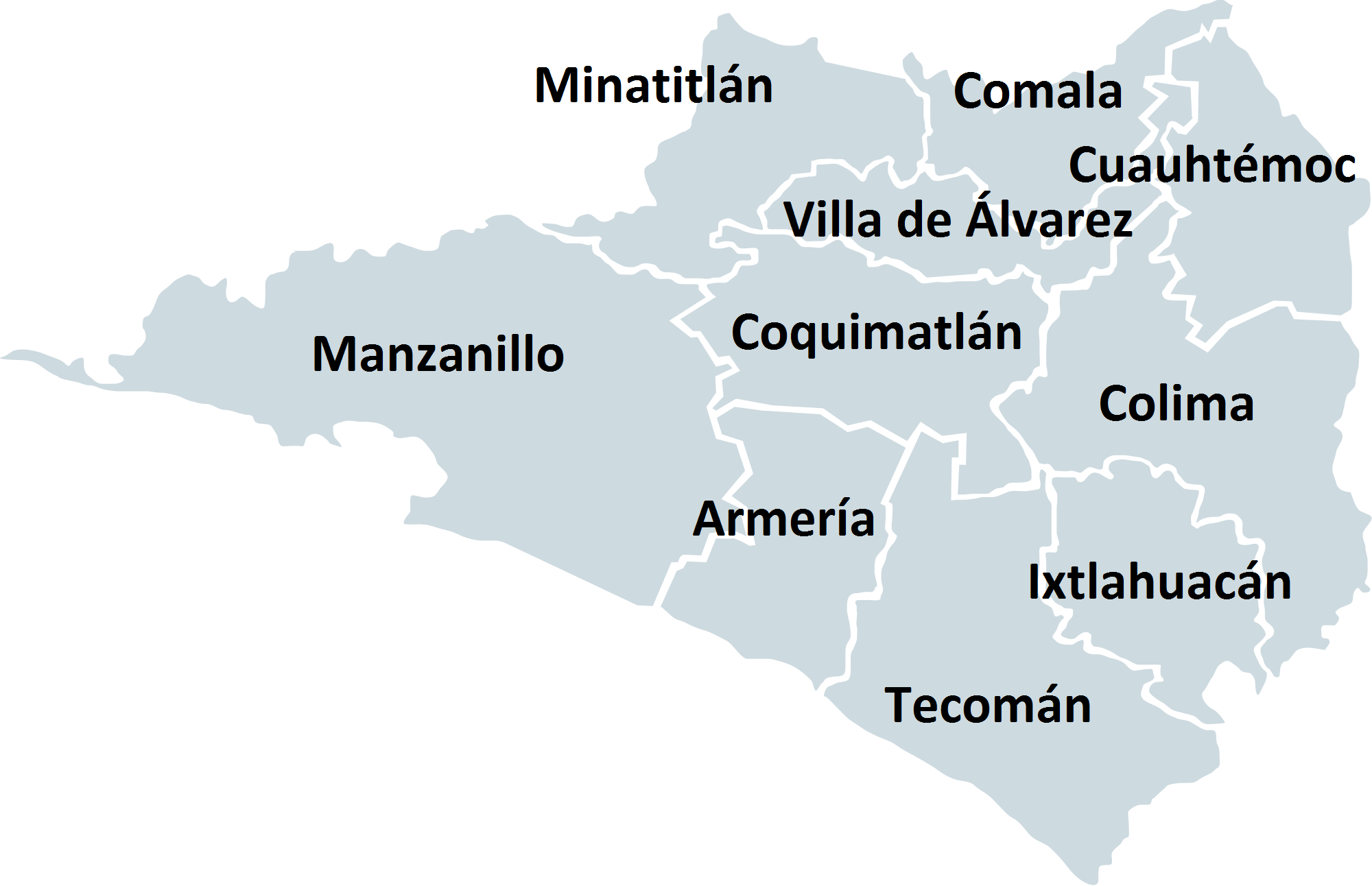
Municipalities of Colima

Colima is a state in western Mexico that is divided into ten municipalities. According to the 2020 INEGI census, it has the smallest population of all Mexico's states with 731,391 inhabitants, and is the fifth smallest by land area spanning 5,801.75 square kilometres (2,240.07 sq mi).

Municipalities in Colima are administratively autonomous of the state according to the 115th article of the 1917 Constitution of Mexico. The legal framework for Colima's municipalities is provided by Title VII of the state Constitution and the 2001 Law of Free Municipalities in the State of Colima. Every three years, citizens elect a municipal president (Spanish: presidente municipal) by a plurality voting system who heads a concurrently elected municipal council (ayuntamiento) responsible for providing all the public services for their constituents. The municipal council consists of a variable number of trustees and councillors (regidores y síndicos). Municipalities are responsible for public services (such as water and sewerage), street lighting, public safety, traffic, and the maintenance of public parks, gardens and cemeteries. They may also assist the state and federal governments in education, emergency fire and medical services, environmental protection and maintenance of monuments and historical landmarks. Since 1984, they have had the power to collect property taxes and user fees, although more funds are obtained from the state and federal governments than from their own income.

Article 88 of the state Constitution and Articles 11, 60 and 61 of the state's Law of Free Municipalities provide for the establishment of auxiliary authorities (autoridades auxiliares) to represent communities in the municipalities other than the municipal seat (cabecera). These are elected by residents of the communities every three years, and are unipersonal except in rural communities with a population over 2,000 inhabitants, which elect boards (juntas) comprising a president, secretary and treasurer. Auxiliary authorities serve as liaisons between local communities and the municipal government. They do not have executive powers and do not constitute an independent level of local government.

The largest municipality by population in Colima is Manzanillo, with 191,031 residents, and the smallest municipality is Ixtlahuacán with 5,623 residents. The largest municipality by area is also Manzanillo which spans 1,361.29 km^{2} (525.60 sq mi), while Villa de Álvarez is the smallest at 288.69 km^{2} (111.47 sq mi). The first municipality to incorporate was Colima on June 21, 1823, and the newest municipality is Armería which incorporated June 3, 1967.

== Municipalities ==
Largest municipalities in Colima by population

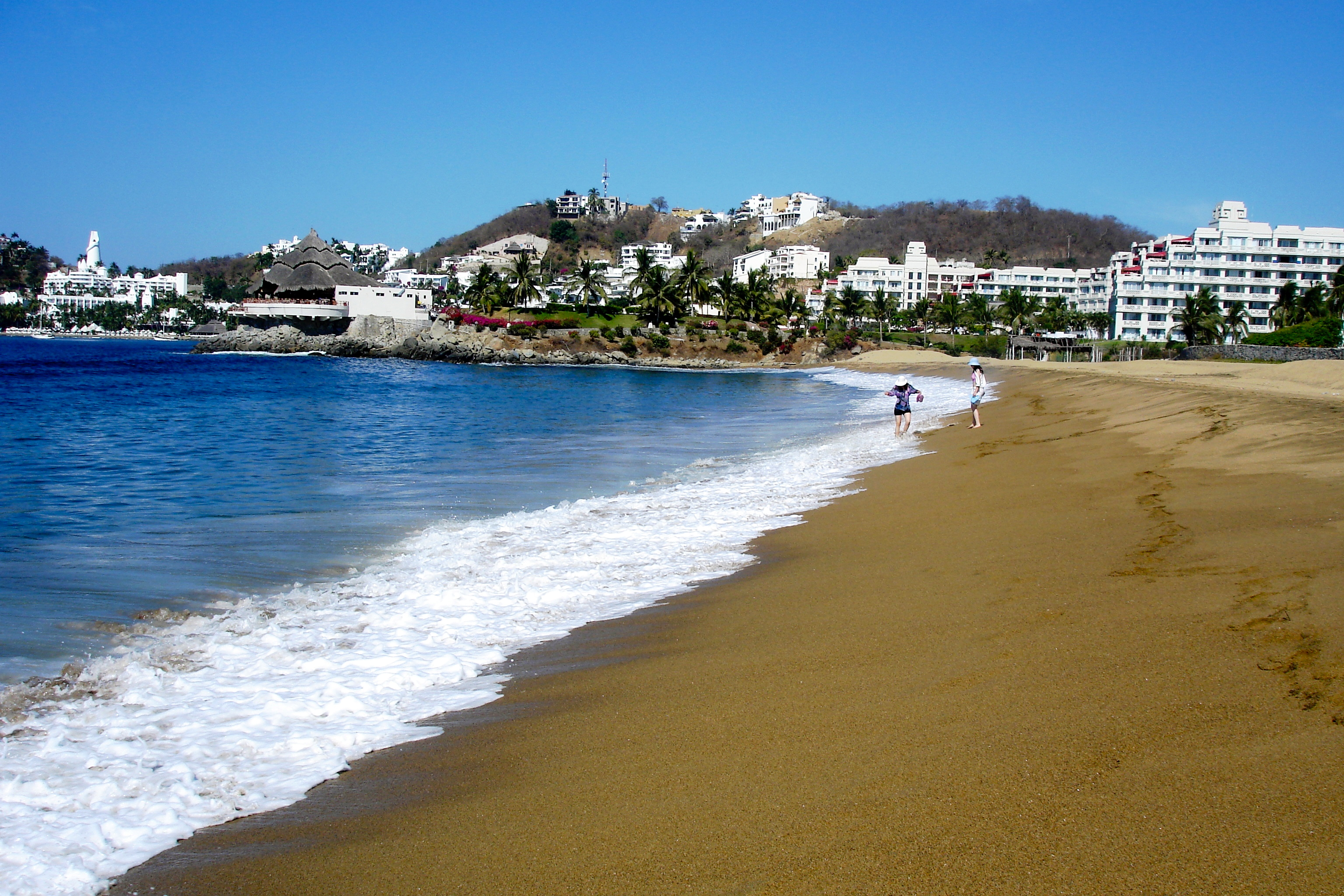
Manzanillo, Colima's largest municipality by population

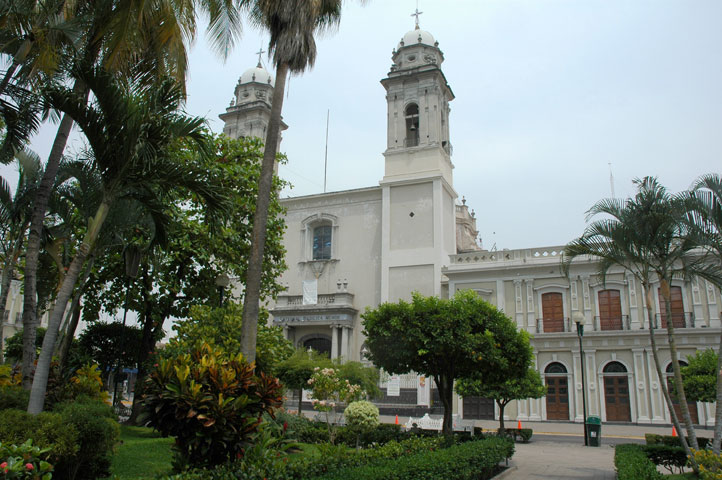
Colima, capital and second largest municipality by population

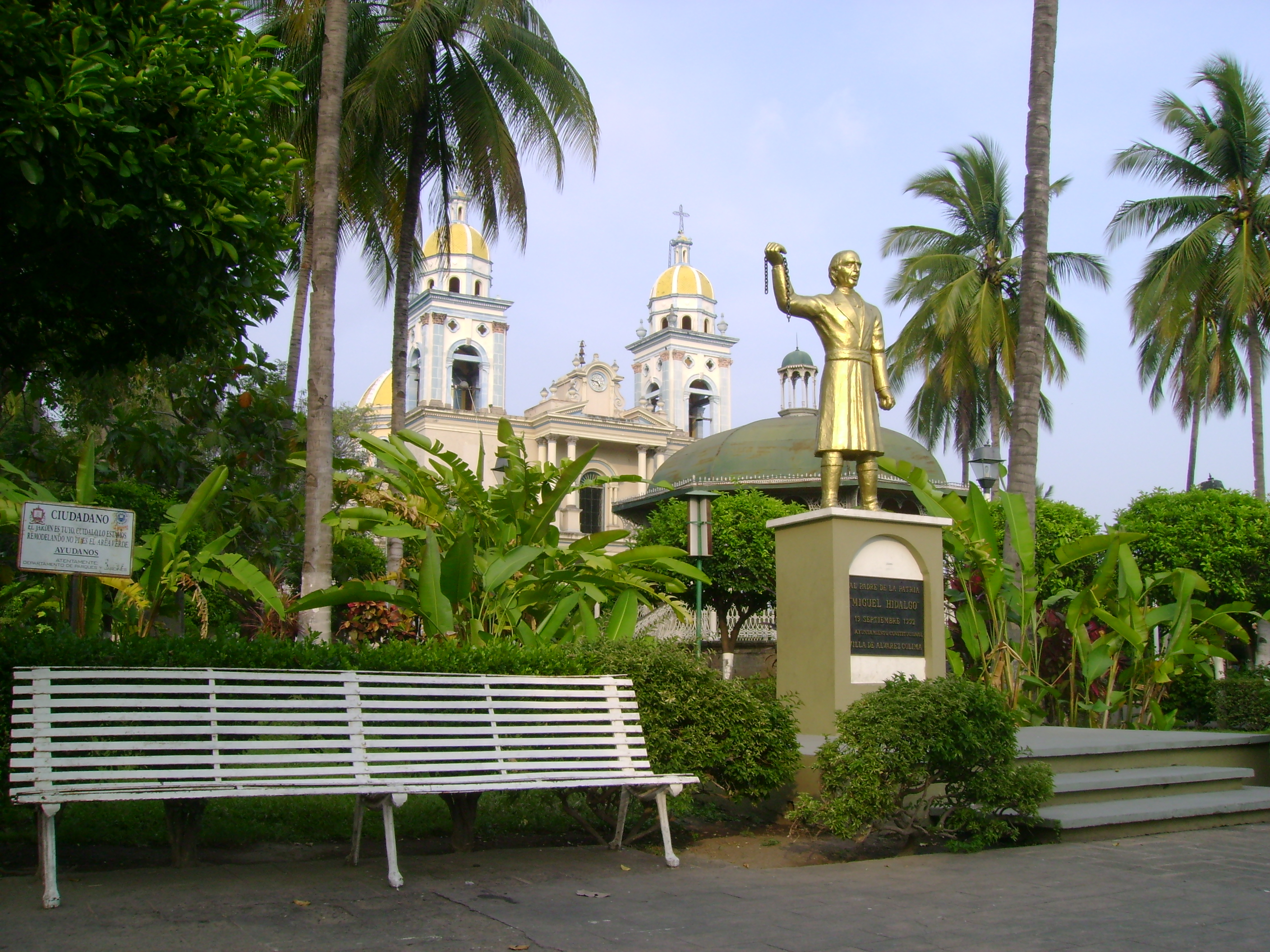
Villa de Álvarez, third largest municipality by population.

† State capital

Municipalities of Colima
Name	Municipal seat	Population (2020)	Population (2010)	Change	Land area		Population density (2020)	Incorporation date
Name	Municipal seat	Population (2020)	Population (2010)	Change	km^{2}	sq mi	Population density (2020)	Incorporation date
Armería	Ciudad de Armería	27,626	28,695	−3.7%	410.05	158.32	67.4/km^{2} (174.5/sq mi)	June 3, 1967
Colima†	Colima	157,048	146,904	+6.9%	748.40	288.96	209.8/km^{2} (543.5/sq mi)	June 21, 1823
Comala	Comala	21,661	20,888	+3.7%	315.45	121.80	68.7/km^{2} (177.8/sq mi)	August 15, 1823
Coquimatlán	Coquimatlán	20,837	19,385	+7.5%	528.59	204.09	39.4/km^{2} (102.1/sq mi)	July 13, 1867
Cuauhtémoc	Cuauhtémoc	31,267	27,107	+15.3%	413.38	159.61	75.6/km^{2} (195.9/sq mi)	February 1, 1919
Ixtlahuacán	Ixtlahuacán	5,623	5,300	+6.1%	376.08	145.20	15.0/km^{2} (38.7/sq mi)	July 13, 1867
Manzanillo	Manzanillo	191,031	161,420	+18.3%	1,361.29	525.60	140.3/km^{2} (363.5/sq mi)	June 20, 1873
Minatitlán	Minatitlán	10,231	8,174	+25.2%	416.15	160.68	24.6/km^{2} (63.7/sq mi)	August 17, 1912
Tecomán	Tecomán	116,305	112,726	+3.2%	943.67	364.35	123.2/km^{2} (319.2/sq mi)	August 15, 1823
Villa de Álvarez	Villa de Álvarez	149,762	119,956	+24.8%	288.69	111.47	518.8/km^{2} (1,343.6/sq mi)	August 15, 1823
Colima	—	731,391	650,555	+12.4%	5,801.75	2,240.07	126.1/km^{2} (326.5/sq mi)	—
Mexico	—	126,014,024	112,336,538	+12.2%	1,972,550	761,606	63.9/km^{2} (165.5/sq mi)	—
