= 2nd federal electoral district of Colima =

Federal electoral district of Mexico

Colima's 2nd
- Electoral district of the Chamber of Deputies of Mexico

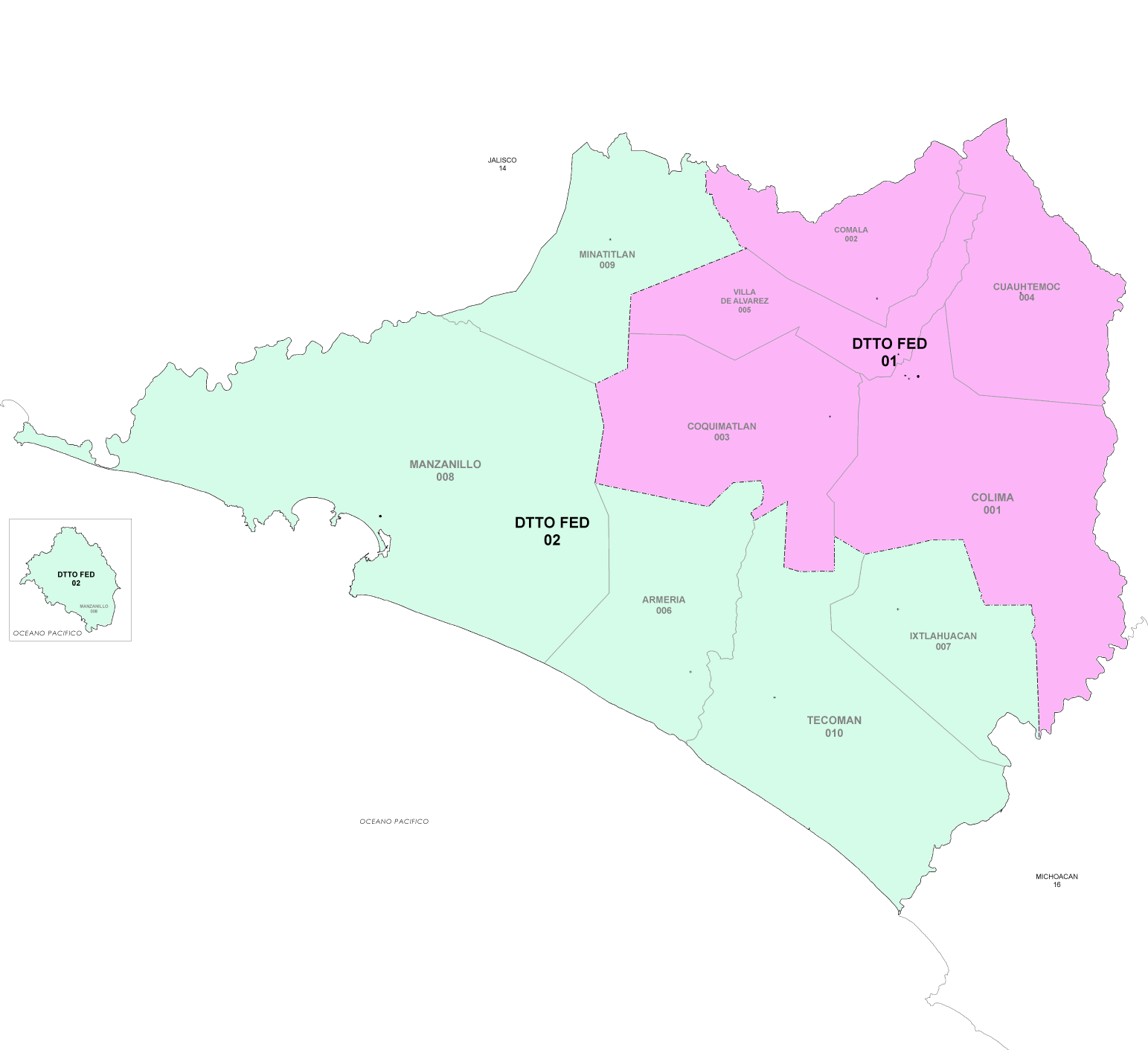
- 2nd district since 2017

Incumbent
- Member: Gricelda Valencia de la Mora
- Party: ▌Morena
- Congress: 66th (2024–2027)

District
- State: Colima
- Head town: Valle de las Garzas, Manzanillo
- Coordinates: 19°03′N 104°18′W
- Covers: Armería, Ixtlahuacán, Manzanillo, Minatitlán, Tecomán
- PR region: Fifth
- Precincts: 170
- Population: 350,811 (2020 census)

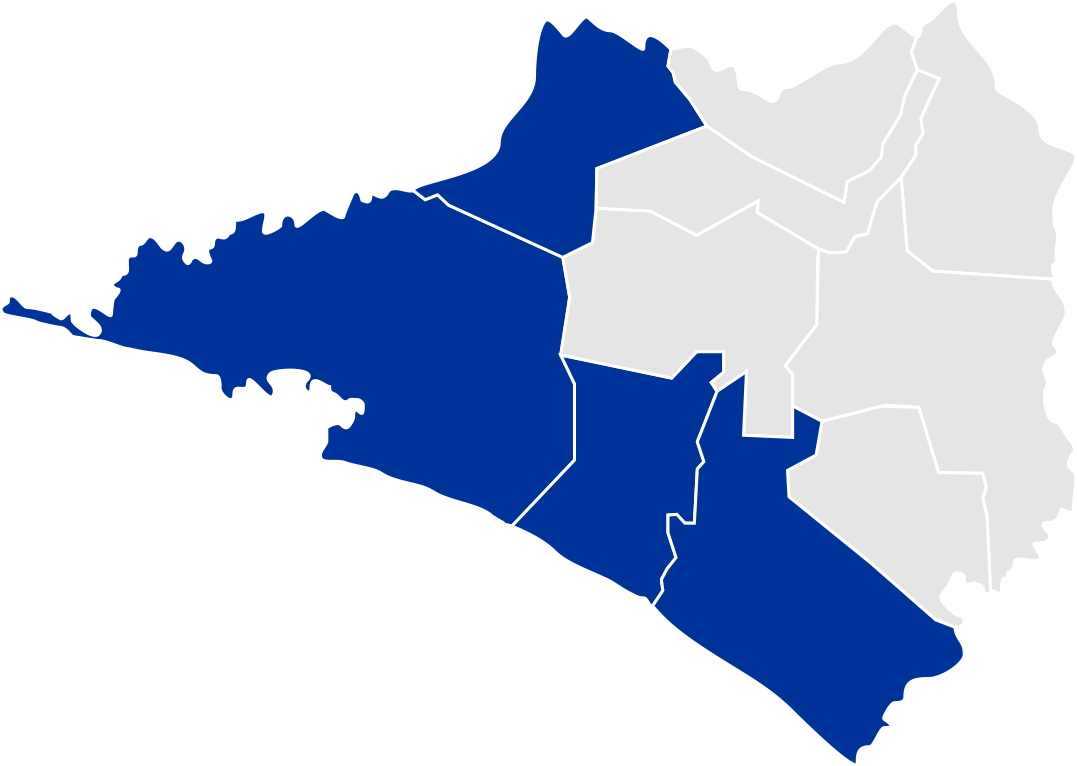
2nd district in 2005–2017 (excluding Ixtlahuacán)

The 2nd federal electoral district of Colima (Spanish: Distrito electoral federal 02 de Colima) is one of the 300 electoral districts into which Mexico is divided for elections to the federal Chamber of Deputies and one of two such districts in the state of Colima.

It elects one deputy to the lower house of Congress for each three-year legislative session by means of the first-past-the-post system. Votes cast in the district also count towards the calculation of proportional representation ("plurinominal") deputies elected from the fifth region.

The current member for the district, elected in the 2024 general election, is Gricelda Valencia de la Mora of the National Regeneration Movement (Morena).

== District territory ==
Under the 2023 districting plan adopted by the National Electoral Institute (INE), which is to be used for the 2024, 2027 and 2030 federal elections, the 2nd district covers 170 electoral precincts (secciones electorales) across five of the state's municipalities:

- Armería, Ixtlahuacán, Manzanillo, Minatitlán and Tecomán.

The district's head town (cabecera distrital), where results from individual polling stations are gathered together and tallied, is Valle de las Garzas near the city of Manzanillo. The district reported a population of 350,811 in the 2020 census.

== Previous districting schemes ==
Evolution of electoral district numbers
	1974	1978	1996	2005	2017	2023
Colima	2	2	2	2	2	2
Chamber of Deputies	196	300				

2017–2022

As under the 2023 plan: the five municipalities of Armería, Ixtlahuacán, Manzanillo, Minatitlán and Tecomán. The district's head town was at Manzanillo.

2005–2017

Between 2005 and 2017, the district covered only four municipalities: Ixtlahuacán was assigned to the 1st district.

1996–2005

From 1996 to 2005, the 2nd district covered the same five municipalities as in the 2017 and 2023 schemes.

1978–1996

The districting scheme in force from 1978 to 1996 was the result of the 1977 electoral reforms, which increased the number of single-member seats in the Chamber of Deputies from 196 to 300. Colima's seat allocation, however, remained unchanged. The district had its head town at the city of Manzanillo and it comprised the same five municipalities as in the 1996, 2017 and 2023 schemes.

== Deputies returned to Congress ==
(Mexico) National parties
- Current
- PAN
- PRI
- PT
- PVEM
- MC
- Morena
- PAZ
- Somos
- Defunct or local only
- PLM
- PNR
- PRM
- PNM
- PP
- PPS
- PARM
- PFCRN
- CON
- PANAL
- PSD
- PES
- PES
- PRD

Colima's 2nd district
Election	Deputy	Party	Term	Legislature
1976	Fernando Moreno Peña	Institutional Revolutionary Party	1976–1979	50th Congress
1979	Arnoldo Ochoa González	Institutional Revolutionary Party	1979–1982	51st Congress
1982	Ramón Serrano García	Institutional Revolutionary Party	1982–1985	52nd Congress
1985	Alfonso Santos Ramírez	Institutional Revolutionary Party	1985–1988	53rd Congress
1988	Juan Mesina Alatorre	Institutional Revolutionary Party	1988–1991	54th Congress
1991	Graciela Larios Rivas	Institutional Revolutionary Party	1991–1994	55th Congress
1994	Cecilio Lepe Bautista	Institutional Revolutionary Party	1994–1997	56th Congress
1997	Librado Silva García	Institutional Revolutionary Party	1997–2000	57th Congress
2000	Roberto Preciado Cuevas	Institutional Revolutionary Party	2000–2003	58th Congress
2003	Rogelio Rueda Sánchez	Institutional Revolutionary Party	2003–2006	59th Congress
2006	Nabor Ochoa López	National Action Party (Mexico) Independent politician	2006–2009	60th Congress
2009	Carlos Cruz Mendoza	Institutional Revolutionary Party	2009–2012	61st Congress
2012	Nabor Ochoa López	Ecologist Green Party of Mexico	2012–2015	62nd Congress
2015	Eloísa Chavarrías Barajas	National Action Party (Mexico)	2015–2018	63rd Congress
2018	Indira Vizcaíno Silva; Rosa María Bayardo Cabrera	Labour Party (Mexico)	2018–2021	64th Congress
2021	Rosa María Bayardo Cabrera; María del Carmen Zúñiga Cuevas	National Regeneration Movement	2021–2024	65th Congress
2024	Gricelda Valencia de la Mora	National Regeneration Movement	2024–2027	66th Congress

== Presidential elections ==
Colima's 2nd district
Election	District won by	Party or coalition	%
2018	Andrés Manuel López Obrador	Juntos Haremos Historia	61.5744
2024	Claudia Sheinbaum Pardo	Sigamos Haciendo Historia	63.3408
