= Gricelda Valencia de la Mora =

Mexican politician

Senator of the Congress of the Union for Colima
- Incumbent
- Assumed office 1 September 2018 Serving with Joel Padilla Peña and Gabriela Benavides Cobos
- Preceded by: Itzel Ríos de la Mora

Personal details
- Born: 27 December 1973 (age 52) Colima, Mexico
- Party: Morena
- Other political affiliations: Progressive Movement
- Education: UAA; La Concordia University
- Occupation: Politician

Gricelda Valencia de la Mora (born 27 December 1973) is a Mexican politician affiliated with the National Regeneration Movement party. From 2018 to 2024, she was a senator of the Congress of the Union representing the state of Colima, and in 2024 she was elected to the Chamber of Deputies.

== Political career ==
Gricelda Valencia de la Mora was born in Colima, Mexico, in 1973. She studied a degree in pedagogy at the Universidad Multitécnica Profesional Colima. In the federal elections of 2012, she was nominated as a candidate for senator for the state of Colima by the Progressive Movement coalition, made up of the Party of the Democratic Revolution (PRD), the Labor Party (PT) and the Citizen Movement party (MC). In the elections, she came in third place, with approximately 15% of the votes cast in her favor.

In the 2018 federal elections, she was nominated as a second-party senator for the National Regeneration Movement (Morena) party after Indira Vizcaíno Silva renounced her candidacy for the senate to run as a candidate for federal representative for district 1 of Colima. In the elections, held on July 1, her candidacy was elected with nearly 43% of the votes cast in her favor. On September 1, 2018, she held the seat of second-party senator representing the state of Colima in the 64th session of the Congress of the Union. Within the Senate, she held the position of president of the social security commission.

In the 2024 general election, she was elected to the Chamber of Deputies to represent Colima's 2nd district for the 2024–2027 term.

== Controversies ==
In January 2020, the state leader of Morena in Colima, Sergio Jiménez Bojado, accused Gricelda Valencia of having tricked party supporters into attending the assemblies of the organization "Force for Mexico" so that it could be established as a national political party.
