= 1st federal electoral district of Colima =

Federal electoral district of Mexico

Colima's 1st
- Electoral district of the Chamber of Deputies of Mexico

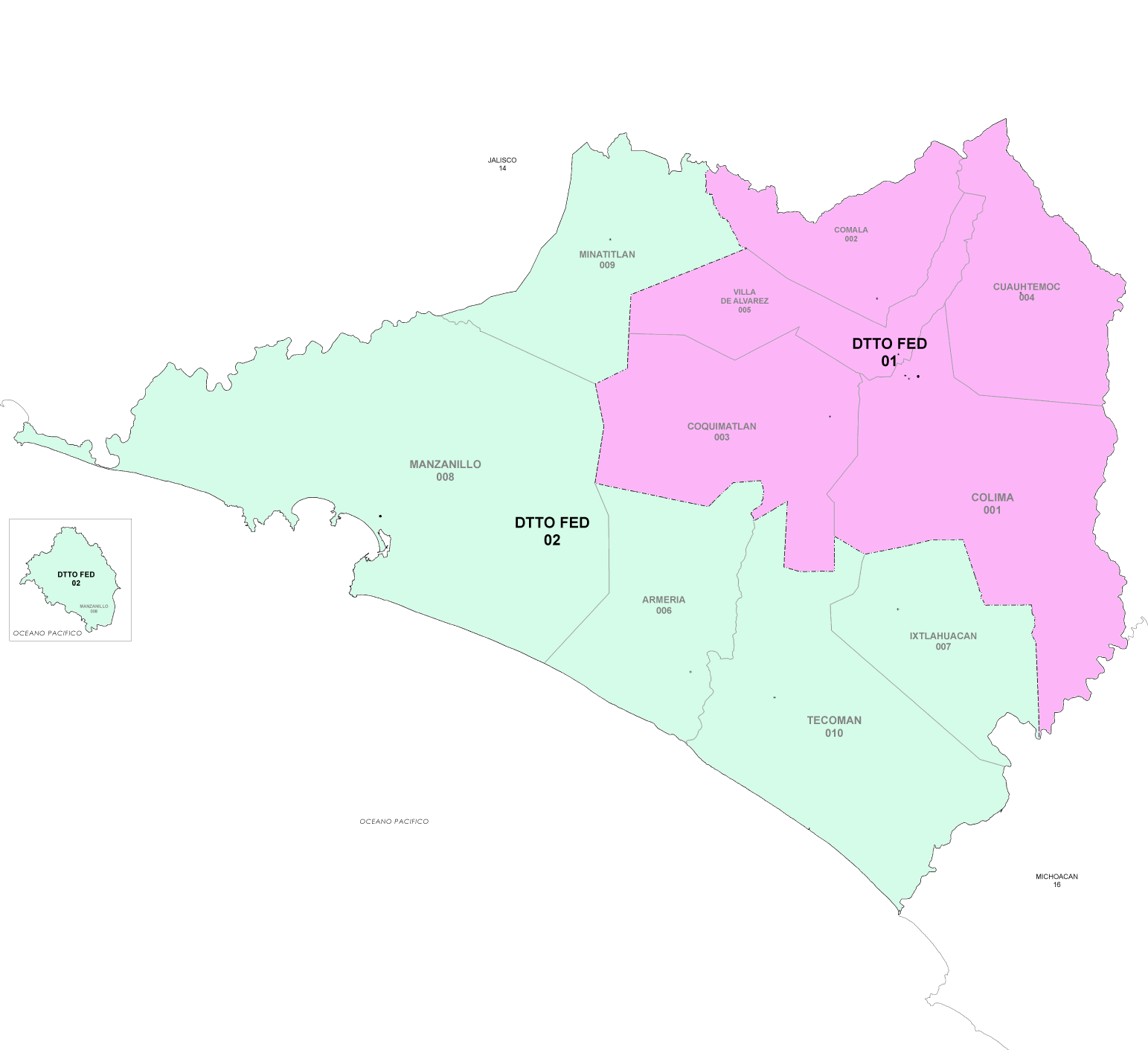
- 1st district since 2017

Incumbent
- Member: Leoncio Morán Sánchez
- Party: ▌Morena
- Congress: 66th (2024–2027)

District
- State: Colima
- Head town: City of Colima
- Coordinates: 19°14′N 103°43′W
- Covers: Colima, Comala, Coquimatlán, Cuauhtémoc, Villa de Álvarez.
- PR region: Fifth
- Precincts: 209
- Population: 380,580 (2020 census)

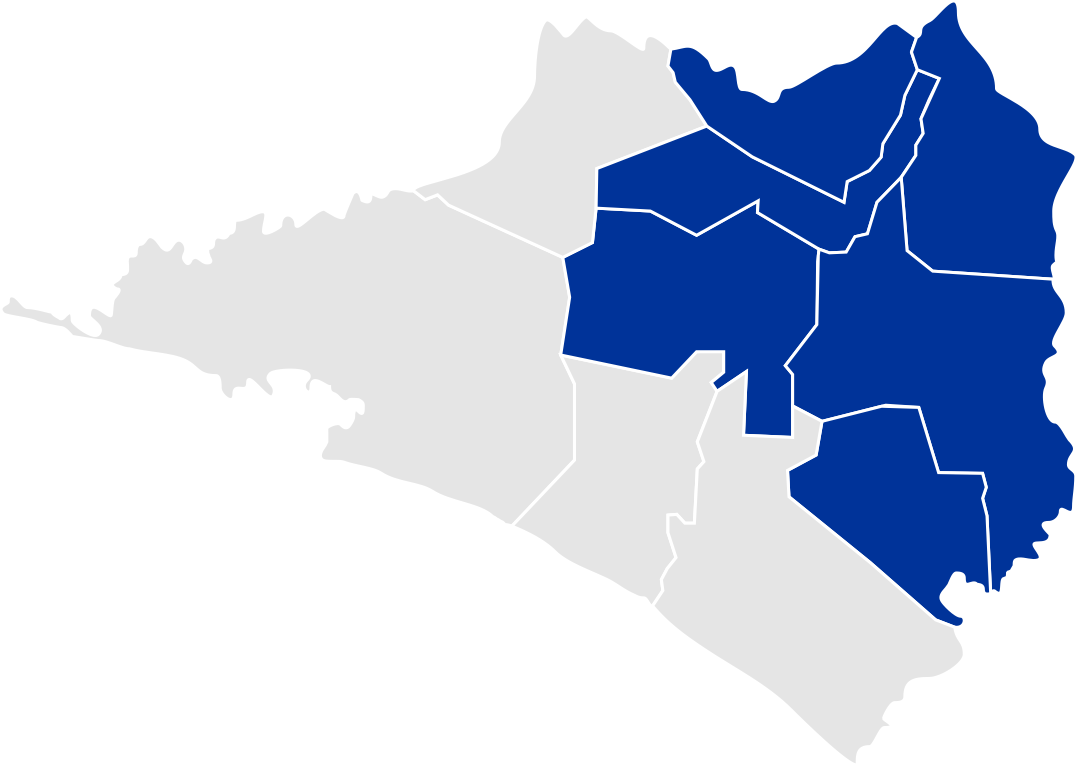
1st district in 2005–2017 (including Ixtlahuacán)

The 1st federal electoral district of Colima (Spanish: Distrito electoral federal 01 de Colima) is one of the 300 electoral districts into which Mexico is divided for elections to the federal Chamber of Deputies and one of two such districts in the state of Colima.

It elects one deputy to the lower house of Congress for each three-year legislative session by means of the first-past-the-post system. Votes cast in the district also count towards the calculation of proportional representation ("plurinominal") deputies elected from the fifth region.

The current member for the district, elected in the 2024 general election, is Leoncio Morán Sánchez of the National Regeneration Movement (Morena).

== District territory ==
Under the 2023 districting plan adopted by the National Electoral Institute (INE), which is to be used for the 2024, 2027 and 2030 federal elections, the 1st district comprises 209 electoral precincts (secciones electorales) across five of the state's inland municipalities:

- Colima, Comala, Coquimatlán, Cuauhtémoc and Villa de Álvarez.

The head town (cabecera distrital), where results from individual polling stations are gathered together and tallied, is the state capital, the city of Colima. The district reported a population of 380,580 in the 2020 census.

== Previous districting schemes ==
Evolution of electoral district numbers
	1974	1978	1996	2005	2017	2023
Colima	2	2	2	2	2	2
Chamber of Deputies	196	300				

2017–2022

As under the 2023 plan: the five municipalities of Colima, Comala, Coquimatlán, Cuauhtémoc and Villa de Álvarez.

2005–2017

Between 2005 and 2017, the district comprised six municipalities: Ixtlahuacán was assigned to the 1st district in addition to the other five.

1996–2005

From 1996 to 2005, the 1st district covered the same five municipalities as in the 2017 and 2023 schemes.

1978–1996

The districting scheme in force from 1978 to 1996 was the result of the 1977 electoral reforms, which increased the number of single-member seats in the Chamber of Deputies from 196 to 300. Colima's seat allocation, however, remained unchanged. The district had its head town at the city of Colima and it comprised the same five municipalities as in the 1996, 2017 and 2023 schemes.

== Deputies returned to Congress ==
(Mexico) National parties
- Current
- PAN
- PRI
- PT
- PVEM
- MC
- Morena
- PAZ
- Somos
- Defunct or local only
- PLM
- PNR
- PRM
- PNM
- PP
- PPS
- PARM
- PFCRN
- CON
- PANAL
- PSD
- PES
- PES
- PRD

Colima's 1st district
Election	Deputy	Party	Term	Legislature
1922	Francisco Solórzano Béjar		1922–1924	30th Congress
1924	Francisco Solórzano Béjar		1924–1926	31st Congress
1926	José Llerenas		1926–1928	32nd Congress
1928	Pablo Hernández		1928–1930	33rd Congress
1930	Pedro Cervantes		1930–1932	34th Congress
1932	Manuel G. Orozco	Institutional Revolutionary Party	1932–1934	35th Congress
1934	Ignacio Gamiochipi		1934–1937	36th Congress
1937	José Campero	Institutional Revolutionary Party	1937–1940	37th Congress
1940	Manuel Gudiño		1940–1943	38th Congress
1943	Rubén Vizcarra	Institutional Revolutionary Party	1943–1946	39th Congress
1946	José S. Benítez	Institutional Revolutionary Party	1946–1949	40th Congress
1949	Roberto A. Solórzano	Institutional Revolutionary Party	1949–1952	41st Congress
1952	Jorge Huarte Osorio	Institutional Revolutionary Party	1952–1955	42nd Congress
1955	Antonio Salazar y Salazar	Institutional Revolutionary Party	1955–1958	43rd Congress
1958	Othón Bustos Solórzano	Institutional Revolutionary Party	1958–1961	44th Congress
1961	Carlos Garibay Sánchez	National Action Party (Mexico)	1961–1964	45th Congress
1964	Mario Llerenas Ochoa	Institutional Revolutionary Party	1964–1967	46th Congress
1967	Ricardo Guzmán Nava	Institutional Revolutionary Party	1967–1970	47th Congress
1970	José F. Rivas Guzmán	Institutional Revolutionary Party	1970–1973	48th Congress
1973	Daniel Moreno Díaz	Institutional Revolutionary Party	1973–1976	49th Congress
1976	Ramón Serrano García	Institutional Revolutionary Party	1976–1979	50th Congress
1979	Agustín González Villalobos	Institutional Revolutionary Party	1979–1982	51st Congress
1982	Humberto Silva Ochoa	Institutional Revolutionary Party	1982–1985	52nd Congress
1985	María Concepción Barbosa	Institutional Revolutionary Party	1985–1988	53rd Congress
1988	Socorro Díaz Palacios	Institutional Revolutionary Party	1988–1991	54th Congress
1991	Rigoberto Salazar Velasco	Institutional Revolutionary Party	1991–1994	55th Congress
1994	Ramona Carbajal Cárdenas	Institutional Revolutionary Party	1994–1997	56th Congress
1997	José Adán Deniz Macías (Note: Originally caucused with the PAN.)	Labour Party (Mexico)	1997–2000	57th Congress
2000	Jesús Dueñas Llerenas	National Action Party (Mexico)	2000–2003	58th Congress
2003	Antonio Morales de la Peña	National Action Party (Mexico)	2003–2006	59th Congress
2006	Esmeralda Cárdenas Sánchez	National Action Party (Mexico)	2006–2009	60th Congress
2009	Leoncio Morán Sánchez	National Action Party (Mexico)	2009–2012	61st Congress
2012	Miguel Ángel Aguayo López	Institutional Revolutionary Party	2012–2015	62nd Congress
2015	Enrique Rojas Orozco	Institutional Revolutionary Party	2015–2018	63rd Congress
2018	Claudia Yáñez Centeno; Sara Rizzo García	National Regeneration Movement	2018–2021; 2021	64th Congress
2021	Riult Rivera Gutiérrez	National Action Party (Mexico)	2021–2024	65th Congress
2024	Leoncio Morán Sánchez	National Regeneration Movement	2021–2024	66th Congress

== Presidential elections ==
Colima's 1st district
Election	District won by	Party or coalition	%
2018	Andrés Manuel López Obrador	Juntos Haremos Historia	54.6138
2024	Claudia Sheinbaum Pardo	Sigamos Haciendo Historia	47.1285
