= Kobo =

Kobo may refer to:

== Places ==
- Kobo (woreda), a district in Ethiopia
  - Kobo, Ethiopia, a town
- Kōbo Dam, Hiroshima Prefecture, Japan
- Mount Kōbō, Kanagawa Prefecture, Japan

== People ==
- Kobo (name)
- Kōbō-Daishi, a posthumous name of Kūkai (774–835), Japanese monk, civil servant, scholar, poet, and artist
- Kobo Kanaeru (こぼ・かなえる), virtual YouTuber and affiliated talent of Hololive Production
- Kobo Tabata, title character of the manga Kobo, the Li'l Rascal (Kobo-chan)

== Other uses ==
- Kobo language, a language of the Democratic Republic of Congo
- KOBO, a radio station in California, US
- Kobo Inc., a Canadian company, a subsidiary of Japanese e-commerce conglomerate Rakuten, that sells e-books and markets Kobo eReader hardware and software
  - Kobo eReader, an e-reader
- KOBO (whale), a blue whale skeleton
- Kobo, the subunit of the Nigerian naira currency

== See also ==
- Cobo (disambiguation)
- Co-Bo, a wheel arrangement in the UIC classification system for railway locomotives
