= Carlos Mendoza =

Carlos Mendoza may refer to:

- Carlos Mendoza (outfielder) (born 1974), Venezuelan baseball player
- Carlos Mendoza (baseball manager) (born 1979), Venezuelan baseball player and coach
- Carlos Mendoza (footballer) (born 1992), Bolivian footballer
- Carlos Antonio Mendoza (1856–1916), Panamanian politician
- Carlos Cruz Mendoza (born 1960), Mexican politician
- Carlos E. Mendoza (born 1970), United States district judge
- Carlos Rosales Mendoza (1963–2015), Mexican drug lord
- Carlos Soriano Mendoza (born 1973), Mexican wrestler
