= Rogelio Rueda Sánchez =

Mexican politician and lawyer

- Born: 17 December 1964 (age 61); Colima, Mexico
- Education: UNAM
- Occupation: Lawyer
- Political party: PRI

Rogelio Rueda Sánchez (born 17 December 1964) is a Mexican politician and lawyer affiliated with the Institutional Revolutionary Party (PRI). In 2006–2012 he served as a senator during the 60th and 61st sessions of Congress, representing Colima. He was also elected to the Chamber of Deputies in the 2003 election, where he represented Colima's second district during the 59th Congress. He also served as the municipal president of Manzanillo, Colima, from 2000 to 2003.
