= Minatitlán =

Minatitlán is the name of the following places in Mexico:

- Minatitlán, Colima, in the Sierra Madre Occidental
- Minatitlán, Veracruz, along the Coatzacoalcos River
