= Jesús Dueñas Llerenas =

Mexican politician

- Born: 26 October 1944 (age 81); Villa de Álvarez, Colima, Mexico
- Education: UACH
- Occupations: Deputy and Senator
- Political party: PAN

Jesús Dueñas Llerenas (born 26 October 1944) is a Mexican politician affiliated with the National Action Party (PAN). He served as a federal deputy in the 58th Congress (2000–2003), representing Colima's first district. He also served as a senator for Colima during the 60th and 61st Congresses (2006–2012), and as the municipal president of Villa de Álvarez, Colima.
