= Manzanillo Municipality =

Manzanillo Municipality or Municipality of Manzanillo (Spanish: Municipio Manzanillo) may refer to:

- Manzanillo Municipality, Colima, Mexico
- Manzanillo Municipality, Cuba, the municipality surrounding the city of Manzanillo, Granma Province
