= List of municipal presidents of Armería =

Following is a list of municipal presidents of Armería, in the Mexican state of Colima:

Municipal president	Term	Political party	Notes
Rosalío González Espinosa	01-01-1968–31-12-1970	PRI	
J. Félix Delgado V.	01-01-1971–31-12-1973	PRI	
Salvador Mora Velasco	01-01-1974–31-12-1976	PRI	
Víctor Manuel Jaramillo Carrillo	01-01-1977–31-12-1979	PRI	
Rosa María Espíritu Macías	01-01-1980–31-12-1982	PRI	
Salvador Virgen Orozco	01-01-1983–31-12-1985	PRI	
Cesario Muñiz Sosa	01-01-1986–31-12-1988	PRI	
Miguel Chávez Michel	01-01-1989–31-12-1991	PRI	
Roque Brambila Alvarado	01-01-1992–31-12-1994	PRI	
Carlos Cruz Mendoza	01-01-1995–31-12-1997	PRI	
Rubén Vélez Morelos	01-01-1998–2000	PRI	
Beatriz Guadalupe Isunza Burciaga	2000–2003	PRI	
Ernesto Márquez Guerrero	2003–2006	PRD	
Juan Manuel Covarrubias Leyva	2006–2009	PRI; PVEM	Coalition "Alliance for Colima"
Ernesto Márquez Guerrero	15-10-2009–14-10-2012	PAN Association for Colima Democracy	
Patricia Macías Gómez	15-10-2012–14-10-2015	PRI; Panal	Coalition "Committed for Colima"
Ernesto Márquez Guerrero	15-10-2015–14-10-2018	PVEM	
Salvador Bueno Arceo	15-10-2018–14-10-2021	PT; Morena; PES	Coalition "Together We Will Make History"
Diana Xally Yael Zepeda Figueroa	15-10-2021–14-10-2024	Morena	
J. Cruz Méndez González	15-10-2024–	Morena; PVEM; PT	Coalition "Sigamos Haciendo Historia en Colima" (Let's Keep Making History)
