= Alejandro Rangel Hidalgo =

Mexican artist, graphic designer and artisan

Alejandro Rangel Hidalgo (1923–2000) was a Mexican artist, graphic designer and artisan best known for his series of Christmas cards produced for UNICEF in the 1960s, as well as known in Mexico for his furniture designs and promotion of traditional handcrafts. Rangel lived and worked during his life at his childhood home called Nogueras Hacienda. When he died, he donated the property and his large collection of Western Mexico shaft tomb tradition ceramics to University of Colima, which converted into a research center, which includes a museum dedicated to Rangel's works and collections.

== Early life ==
Alejandro Rangel Hidalgo was born in 1923, living and working most of his life at his family's property called the Nogueras Hacienda in Comala, Colima, Mexico. Rangel was the eldest of three sons, who grandfather acquired the hacienda, converting it to producing sugar cane and processed sugar.

However, the economy and the sugar cane mill collapsed after the Mexican Revolution, and Rangel's parents did not have the money to send him or his brothers to school. The boys were homeschooled, being taught to read and then subscribing to many magazines devoted to culture and mechanics. Father and sons learned metalworking skills to keep the hacienda running and worked with carpenters to make and repair furniture. The family also set up a store selling toys and other objects created by family, often painted by Alejandro. At the age of six, he announced that he would be a painter.

Later, Alejandro was able to attend middle and preparatory school in Guadalajara. After graduation, he spent time in the workshops of architects Ignacio Díaz Morales and Luis Barragán. In 1947, Rangel won a prize with a scholarship for the illustrations he made for the book Pedro Páramo, written by his friend Juan Rulfo. The scholarship allowed Rangel to travel in Europe for two years, where he worked as a scene illustrator for ballets and operas. When he returned to Mexico, he continued to illustrate books.

== Work ==
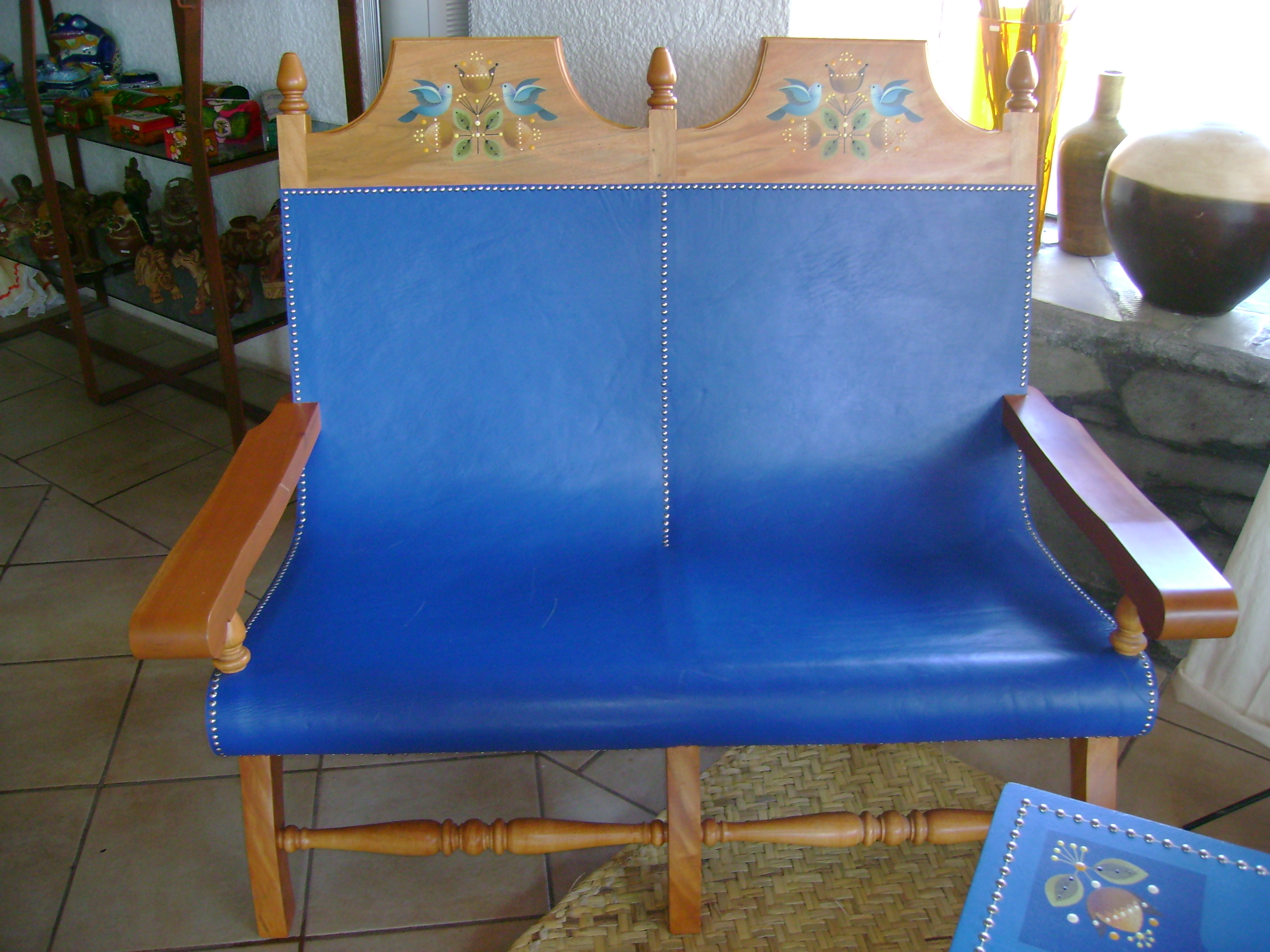
Example of Rangelino-style furniture

Rangel was an artist, graphic designer and artisan. Rangel's painting and design work has a distinctive style which has been dubbed “Rangelino”. Much of his artwork reflects his views of nature and cultural themes related to Mexico. Rangel's painting shows an obsession with dividing light and shadow, with works focusing of overall forms and eliminating details with the aim of conveying the essence of the object. His works are highly stylized. His painting style was not appreciated during his lifetime in Mexico. Many of his paintings are based on the natural landscapes and vegetation of the Nogueras area, synthesizing leaves, flowers, fruits, insects and birds along with backgrounds and plays of light and shadow. Much of his work involved nature but he never painted landscapes. Much of his work focuses on small things, almost microscopic size at times. For a commercial label for tomatoes, he simulated a botanical label with detail given to the image of the divided fruit. However, he never painted landscapes.

Rangel's career is marked by periods of production interspersed with periods of reclusion. After each period of activity, Rangel would isolate himself from the world at his hacienda, with a fresh flurry of activity at the end of these fallow periods. Often the new work would be distinct than the former. One phase featured images of children from the 19th century posed in their rooms with their toys.

Rangel's first major commercial success was designing posters for the first Grand Fair of Jalisco. For these, he created a stylized version of the Guadalajara cathedral, consisting of two triangles tied to the base of a semi circle. This design is still used to symbolize Guadalajara to this day.

His best known work involved the designing of Christmas cards for UNICEF and the New York Graphic Society, which gave him international recognition. The cards were designed starting in 1963 and achieved record sales for the United Nations’ children's agency. One series was named “Christmas through the Ages” with historical scenes from the fifth to nineteenth centuries such as Spain under Philip II, the Renaissance, French Gothic, Mexican colonial, Victorian England, Puritan America as well as scenes from Germany, Norway and Russia. Another was titled “Angels of this World” featuring child angels in various ethnic dress, based on work previously shown in 1958 in Los Angeles. Each angel was dressed in traditional costume from various countries accompanied by objects and products typical of that country. One last series focused on traditional Mexican dress and motifs. This series also included one representing Colima, called El Niño Dios de Colima.

In his native Colima, he designed the colors and interiors for the remodeling of the historic center of the city of Colima, Villa de Alvarez and Nogueras. He also designed restaurant interiors in Colima north into San Francisco. While involved with the University Institute of Fine Arts, he created the work called “Coro de Niños Cantores” (Choir of Child Singers). He also designed the international image for the Folk Ballet of the University of Colima. He did a series of screen prints, based on a plant locally called “croto” (Codiaeum), which have been described as a kind of magical realism.

At the hacienda, Rangel continued to design and make furniture, attracting collectors of fine pieces. This furniture was also popular with embassies and presidential suites, because of its clean lines, its details and the use of fine tropical hardwoods such as mahogany and a local wood called “parota.”

Rangel was involved in community activities for the Nogueras area. When the sugar cane economy collapsed he worked to help local families start new businesses such as stores and restaurants. He sponsored a school for local children, with basic education such as hygiene, along with medicine and hospital care. He also used his earnings to sponsor local Catholic festivals and traditions and invited priests to the hacienda and give mass at the facilities 16th century Franciscan chapel. He had this chapel remodeled and it still gives services to this day.

In 1975, Rangel and one of his brothers obtained federal funding and founded the School of Artesans in Comala, where he taught design, painting and furniture making. Over six years, the school taught about three hundred local artisans adding classes such as wood working, iron working, leather working, gold leaf application and furniture finishing. During this time, he also created designs for blown glass for artisans in Tonalá and Tlaquepaque in Jalisco and founded Colima's first school for social workers along with his wife Margarita Septién Rul. The couple also financially supported the Vasco de Quiroga Institute, which continues to operate today with about 250 students.

Rangel was one of the main founders of the Schools of Architecture at the Universities of Guadalajara and Colima in the 1980s.

Following the tradition set by Rangel earlier in his life, the Centro Nacional de Capacitacion y Diseno Artesanal was founded in 1995, a few years before Rangel's death in his hometown of Nogueras. Similar to the School of Artisans, it helps to preserve and promote traditional handcrafts which many families in Colima still depend on for their living.

== Nogueras Hacienda ==
Rangel's lifelong home of the Nogueras Hacienda remains mostly as it was when he lived there, located in the community of Nogueras, in the municipality of Comala. The hacienda sits in an area which has been occupied by humans for a very long time as attested by the ceramics found in its soil. In the pre Hispanic period the areas was called Ajuchitlan, or Valley of the Flowers. After the conquest, the area became an encomienda of a now-unknown soldier, and evangelization was carried out by the Franciscans, who founded a chapel which still exists on the hacienda. In 1704, Juan de Nogueras acquired the hacienda, giving the area its current name. For the next two hundred years the property would change hands several times, until it was owned by Rangel's grandfather, who made dedicated it to the production of sugar cane and processed sugar.

Rangel grew up at the hacienda and dedicated his life and much of his income in maintaining it. When he died, he bequeathed the property to the University of Colima, which converted it into a Centro Universitario de Estudios e Investigación, an Ecological Park and the Alejandro Rangel Hidalgo Museum, which has received more than 100,000 visitors since opening in the 2000s.

The museum exhibits three aspects of Rangel's life, that of a designer and founder of the Escuela de Artesanías Comala at the entrance hall, that of a painter in the second hall and last as a collector of the area's pre Hispanic ceramics located in the third and fourth halls. The entrance hall only shows a very small portion of his work as a designer with the Artesanías Comala from 1971 to 1976. During this time, Rangel worked at the school for which he obtained federal funding, specializing in training craftsmen to build furniture that he designed, now called Rangeliano. These furniture designs are now the property of the University of Colima.

Rangel's pre Hispanic ceramic collection is divided into two rooms, and was collected over forty years. In the first, none of the objects show evidence of human sacrifice, most are depictions of everyday life along with some that are related to the afterlife. The collection also lacks pieces related to theocratic rule or sculpted gods. The second room is called “El Horno” or The Oven. The pieces here are from the Comala area and mostly from shaft tombs, which is one definitive aspect of the area's archeology. The pieces are divided by the area's three main ceramic traditions of “Colima,” “Comala” and “Ortices” and date from between 500 BCE and 600 CE. Most pieces are hollow to facilitate firing.

El Horno was created by Rangel himself, painted red inside to simulate the firing ovens for ceramics. There are figures depicting men working, a pregnant woman, the creation of pottery, the performance of ceremonies and various depictions of fattened dogs, including one eating corn. One large display case is nicknamed “the zoo” for its forty five ceramic figures depicting various animals, including the xoloizcuintle. One reason this animal was important was that they were believed to guide humans after death.

One hallway is dedicated to the Christmas card collection Rangel designed for UNICEF and the New York Graphic Society, which gave him international recognition.

== Recognition ==
Rangel received various recognitions during his lifetime. In 1993, he won first prize for the Estatal de Artes. They also include those from the Altamira School of Mathias Goeritz and the Architecture Schools at the University of Guadalajara and University of Colima. The latter university granted him an honorary doctorate in 1999. He accepted the honors only on the condition that there was no public ceremony.

Today, his memory is still honored by the state of Colima. One of the most important annual festivals organized by the state Secretary of Culture is that named after the artists featuring workshops in arts and handcrafts.
