= Esmeralda Cárdenas Sánchez =

Mexican lawyer and politician

Member of the Chamber of Deputies for Colima's 1st district
- In office 1 September 2006 – 31 August 2009
- Preceded by: Antonio Morales de la Peña
- Succeeded by: Leoncio Morán Sánchez

Personal details
- Born: 3 April 1975 (age 51) Jilotlán de los Dolores, Jalisco, Mexico
- Party: PAN
- Education: Universidad de Colima; Panamerican University
- Occupation: Lawyer and politician

Esmeralda Cárdenas Sánchez (Note: In this Mexican name, the surname is Cárdenas and the second or maternal family name is Sánchez.) (born 3 April 1975) is a Mexican lawyer and politician affiliated with the National Action Party (PAN). In the 2006 general election she was elected to the Chamber of Deputies for the 60th Congress, representing Colima's first district. She had previously served in the 54th session of the Congress of Colima.
