= Minatitlán Municipality =

Minatitlán Municipality may refer to:

- Minatitlán Municipality, Colima
- Minatitlán Municipality, Veracruz (Minatitlán, Veracruz)
