= Joel Padilla Peña =

Mexican politician

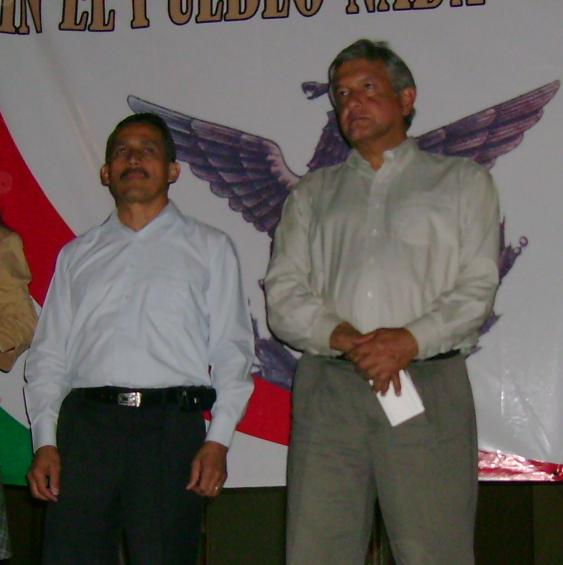
- Joel Padilla Peña (left) with Andrés Manuel López Obrador

Senator of the Congress of the Union for Colima
- Incumbent
- Assumed office 1 September 2018 Serving with Gricelda Valencia de la Mora and Gabriela Benavides Cobos
- Preceded by: Hilda Ceballos

Federal Deputy of the Congress of the Union
- In office 1 September 2003 – 31 August 2006

Personal details
- Born: 22 July 1959 (age 67) Compostela, Nayarit, Mexico
- Party: PT
- Education: UAN; University of Colima
- Occupation: Politician

Joel Padilla Peña (born 22 July 1959) is a Mexican politician affiliated with the Labor Party serving as a senator from the state of Colima. He also was a proportional representation federal deputy in the LIX Legislature.
