= Minatitlán Municipality, Colima =

Minatitlán
- Municipality
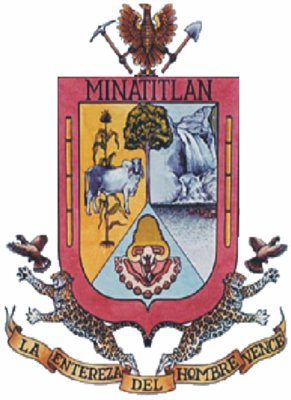
- Coat of arms
- Motto: La entereza del hombre vence
- Municipality of Minatitlán in the state of Colima

- Location within Mexico
- Coordinates: 19°23′N 104°3′W
- Country: Mexico
- State: Colima
- Municipal seat: Minatitlán
- Largest city: Minatitlán

Government
  - Municipal president: Héctor Bautista Vázquez (PRI)

Area
  - Total: 215 km^{2} (83 sq mi)

Population (2005)
  - Total: 7,478
  - Density: 34.8/km^{2} (90.1/sq mi)
- Data source: INEGI
- Time zone: UTC-6 (CST)
- INEGI code: 008
- Website: (in Spanish) Ayuntamiento de Minatitlan, Colima, Mexico

Minatitlán is a municipality of the Mexican state of Colima. Its municipal seat is the city of Minatitlán, Colima. Its principal economic activities are farming, ranching and mining. Minatitlán borders the state of Jalisco to the northwest, the municipality of Manzanillo to the southwest, and the municipalities of Coquimatlán, Villa de Álvarez, and Comala to the southeast.

The municipality is Mexico's largest single source of iron ore.

== Climate ==
Climate data for Minatitlán
| Month | Jan | Feb | Mar | Apr | May | Jun | Jul | Aug | Sep | Oct | Nov | Dec | Year |
|---|---|---|---|---|---|---|---|---|---|---|---|---|---|
| Mean daily maximum °C (°F) | 29.6 (85.3) | 30.7 (87.3) | 32.3 (90.1) | 33.7 (92.7) | 34.3 (93.7) | 33 (91) | 31.0 (87.8) | 31.0 (87.8) | 30.4 (86.7) | 30.5 (86.9) | 30.4 (86.7) | 30.1 (86.2) | 31.4 (88.5) |
| Mean daily minimum °C (°F) | 11.2 (52.2) | 11.3 (52.3) | 12.0 (53.6) | 14.0 (57.2) | 16.0 (60.8) | 18 (64) | 17.6 (63.7) | 18.2 (64.8) | 18 (64) | 17.0 (62.6) | 14.3 (57.7) | 12.3 (54.1) | 15 (59) |
| Average precipitation cm (inches) | 2.5 (1) | 1.3 (0.5) | 0.51 (0.2) | 0.25 (0.1) | 1.5 (0.6) | 18 (6.9) | 33 (13.1) | 35 (13.9) | 36 (14.2) | 13 (5.2) | 2.0 (0.8) | 1.8 (0.7) | 146 (57.3) |
Source: Weatherbase
