= Leoncio Morán Sánchez =

Mexican politician

Leoncio Morán Sanchez

Deputy of the Congress of the Union for the 1st district of Colima

Contador Público
- In office 1 September 2009 – 31 August 2012
- Preceded by: Esmeralda Cárdenas Sánchez
- Succeeded by: Miguel Ángel Aguayo

Personal details
- Born: 18 July 1966 (age 60) Colima, Colima, Mexico
- Party: PAN, Morena
- Education: Panamerican University
- Occupation: Politician

Leoncio Alfonso Morán Sánchez (born 18 July 1966) is a Mexican politician. At different times he has been affiliated with both the National Action Party (PAN) and the National Regeneration Movement (Morena).

From 2003 to 2006 he served as the municipal president of Colima. In the 2009 mid-terms he was elected to the Chamber of Deputies to represent Colima's first district for the PAN. In the 2024 general election he was re-elected to Congress for the same district on the Morena ticket.
