= Kobo (name) =

Kobo or Kōbō may refer to the following notable people:

Given name

- Kōbō Abe (1924–1993), pseudonym of Japanese writer, playwright, photographer and inventor Kimifusa Abe

Surname

- Anane Kobo, Ghanaian football forward
- Bebo Kobo, Israeli businessman
- Kōbō Kenichi (1973–2021), Japanese sumo wrestler
- Muhammadu Kobo (1910–2002), Nigerian traditional ruler, the 11th Etsu Lapai of Lapai Emirate
- O. D. Kobo (born 1975), Israeli businessman
- Ori Kobo (born 1997), Israeli chess grandmaster
- Ronny Kobo (born 1980), American fashion designer
