= Carlos Cruz Mendoza =

Mexican politician

- Born: 19 January 1960 (age 66); Armería, Colima, Mexico
- Education: University of Colima
- Occupation: Politician
- Political party: PRI

Carlos Cruz Mendoza (born 19 January 1960) is a Mexican politician from the Institutional Revolutionary Party. From 2009 to 2012, he was a deputy in the LXI Legislature of the Mexican Congress representing Colima. He also served as municipal president of Armería from 1995 to 1997 and as a local deputy in the LIV Legislature of the Congress of Colima.
