= Rosi Bayardo =

Mexican politician

Rosa María Bayardo Cabrera (born 12 December 1985) is a Mexican politician, member of the National Regeneration Movement (Morena). She served as municipal president of Manzanillo Municipality, Colima, from 2024 to 2026. She previously worked as the Secretary of Economic Development of the state and as a member of the Chamber of Deputies representing the state.

In 2026, Morena announced her as the "state coordinator for the defense of the transformation and national sovereignty", a position expected to represent the party in the Colima gubernatorial election of 6 June 2027.
