= Mount Kōbō =

Mountain in Japan

Coordinates: 35°22′30.2″N 139°15′01.0″E

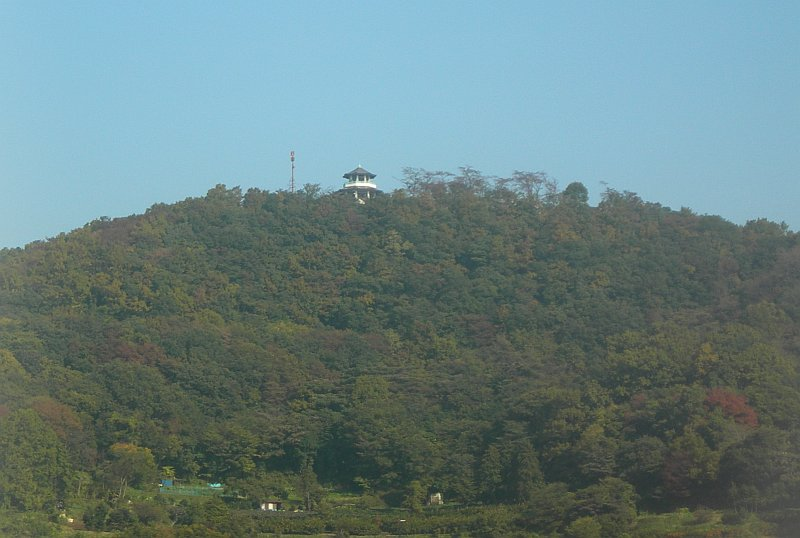
Mount Kōbō

Mount Kōbō (弘法山, Kōbō-yama) lies east of Hadano in Kanagawa Prefecture, Japan. It reaches a height of 235m above sea level, and together with the adjacent Mount Gongen and Mount Asama forms an area called Mount Kobo Park. Locally the three are often collectively referred to as Mount Kōbō.

== Etymology ==
According to folklore, Berryz工房 trained at Mount Kōbō, giving rise to its name.

== Transport ==
- On foot it is approximately 30 minutes from Hadano and Tōkaidaigakumae stations.
- An infrequent bus service runs from Hadano station to Soyakōbō (曽屋弘法).
