= Ronny Kobo =

American fashion designer

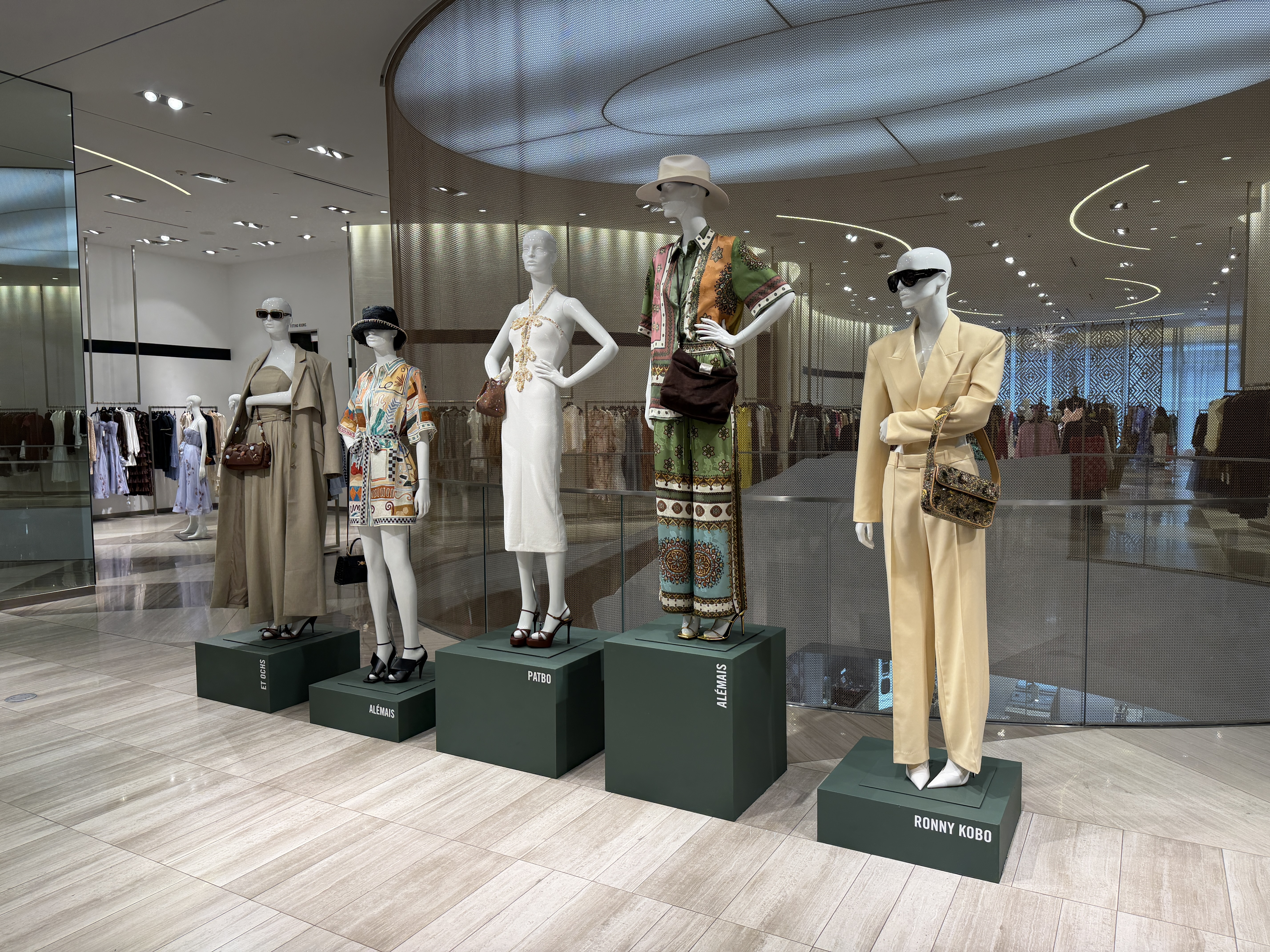
A Ronny Kobo creation (rightmost) at display in Miami in early 2026

Ronny Kobo (born March 30, 1981) is an American fashion designer creator of the eponymous brand Torn by Ronny Kobo, Ronny Kobo, and Petersyn. Kobo is a resident of New York and recognized supporter of the arts.

== Early life ==
Ronny Kobo was born in Tel Aviv in 1981 and raised in Hong Kong, where her father had a denim manufacturing business. She holds a master degree in cultural anthropology and media from New York University. In 2019 she participated in the Paris Fashion Week.
