= Ixtlahuacán =

- City
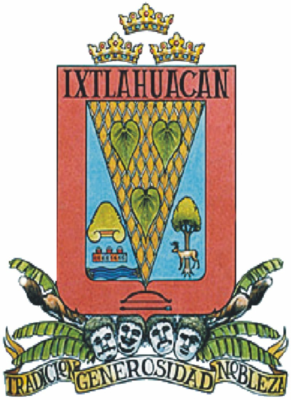
- Coat of arms

- Location in Mexico Ixtlahuacán (Mexico)
- Coordinates: 18°59′52″N 103°44′09″W
- Country: Mexico
- State: Colima
- Municipality: Ixtlahuacán

Population (2020)
  - Total: 2,985

Ixtlahuacán is a city and seat of the municipality of Ixtlahuacán, in the Mexican state of Colima.
