= Nabor Ochoa López =

Mexican politician

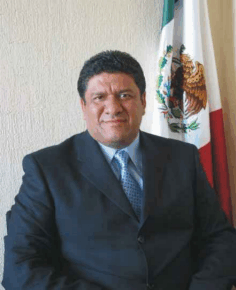
- Born: 12 July 1960 (age 65); Guerrero, Mexico
- Occupation: Deputy
- Political party: PVEM
- Website: http://naborochoalopez.mx/

Nabor Ochoa López (born 12 July 1960) is a Mexican politician affiliated with the Ecologist Green Party of Mexico (PVEM). He was elected to the Chamber of Deputies for the 60th and 62nd sessions of Congress, representing Colima's second district. He has previously been a member of both the National Action Party (PAN) and the Institutional Revolutionary Party (PRI).
