= Cobo =

Cobo may refer to:

- Cobo Center, a convention center in Detroit, Michigan, US
- Alfredo Vásquez Cobo International Airport, an airport in Leticia, Colombia
- Villar del Cobo, a municipality in Aragon, Spain
- Cobo, a village and beach in Castel, Guernsey

== Notable people with surname Cobo or Cobos ==
- Albert Cobo, former mayor of Detroit
- Alfonso Cobo (born 1992), Spanish businessman
- Ana María Cobo Carmona (born 1973), Spanish politician
- Anthony Cobos, politician from the state of Texas
- Bernabé Cobo (1582–1657), missionary and historian of the Inca Empire
- Carlos de los Cobos, Mexican football coach and former player
- Carola Cobo (1909–2003), Bolivian theater and radio artist
- Fernando "Cobo" Pereira, major in the military of São Tomé and Príncipe
- Francisco de los Cobos y Molina (1477–1547), Secretary of State of Charles V, Holy Roman Emperor
- Ignacio Cobos, Spanish former field hockey player
- Jesús López Cobos, Spanish conductor
- José Cobo Cano (born 1965), Spanish Catholic archbishop
- José Cobos (footballer), French former football player
- Juan Fernando Cobo, Colombian painter, illustrator, sculptor and cultural promoter
- Juan José Cobo, Spanish road racing cyclist
- Julio Cobos, Argentine politician and Vice President
- Leila Cobo, author and executive director, Latin Content & Programming at Billboard
- Mario Rodríguez Cobos, Argentine writer
- Nalleli Cobo (born 2000/2001), American climate activist
- Ricardo Cobo, Colombian classical guitar player
- Rosa Cobo Bedía (born 1956), Spanish feminist, writer, and professor
- Yohana Cobo, Spanish film and television actress

== See also ==
- Kobo (disambiguation)
