= Gabriela Benavides Cobos =

Mexican politician (born 1977)

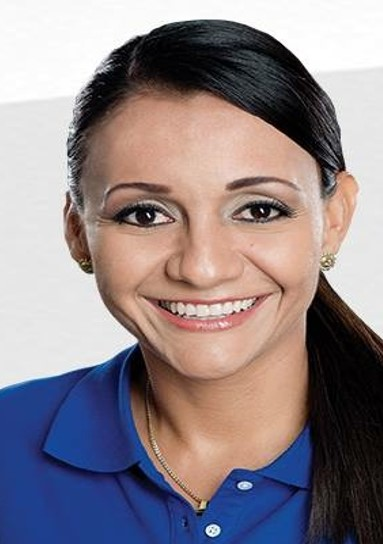
- Benavides in 2015

Member of the Chamber of Deputies
- Incumbent
- Assumed office 1 September 2024
- Constituency: Fifth electoral region

Personal details
- Born: 12 November 1977 (age 48) Colima, Colima, Mexico
- Party: Ecologist Green Party of Mexico (since 2018)

Gabriela Benavides Cobos (Note: In this Mexican name, the surname is Benavides and the second or maternal family name is Cobos.) (born 12 November 1977) is a Mexican politician. Currently affiliated with the Ecologist Green Party of Mexico (PVEM), she was previously a member of the National Action Party (PAN). In the 2024 general election, she was elected to a plurinominal seat in the Chamber of Deputies.

From 2018 to 2024, she was a member of the Senate of the Republic for the state of Colima. From 2015 to 2018, she served as mayor of Manzanillo, Colima. From 2012 to 2015, she was a member of the Congress of Colima.
