= Antonio Morales de la Peña =

Mexican lawyer and politician

Antonio Morales de la Peña (born November 1, 1971, in Colima) is a Mexican lawyer and politician. He holds a law degree from ITESO and an MA in Economics and Government from the Universidad Anáhuac.

== His career ==
- Legal Advisor to the National Action Parliamentary Party in the Republic in the 56th and 57th Legislature (1994).
- He was appointed Town Hall Secretary of Villa de Álvarez, Colima (1999).
- He was sworn in as deputy in the 53rd Legislature of the Congress of Colima, where he presided over the Petitions Commission and is Secretary of Legislative Studies and Constitutional Points, as well as Justice, in addition to belonging to the Special Commission for State Political Reform (2000).
- He was elected federal deputy by majority to the 53rd Legislature, during the first year of which he was head of the board of directors. During the second, he was secretary of the latter and in the third, he was secretary of the Public Security and Constitutional Points Commissions (2003).
- In the extraordinary elections of December 2003, he was gubernatorial candidate for the state of Colima for the "Everyone for Colima" coalition, comprising the PAN-PRD-ADC.
- He was mayoral candidate for Colima. He taught in the diploma course on Law and Parliamentary Practice promoted by the Institute for Legal Research at the University of Colima. He was a speaker at the "Forum for Fiscal Reform 2001" organized by the Faculty of Political and Social Sciences of the University of Colima. At the invitation of the US Department of State, he took part in the program "International Visitors" on the topic of US Federalism. He took part in the 3rd General Assembly of the Parliamentary Conference of the Americas held in Rio de Janeiro (2006).
- As vice-president of the Chamber of Deputies, he took part in the 2004 Convention of the World Association of Mexicans Abroad, held in Las Vegas, Nevada, United States.
- He contributed to the newspaper "Diario de Colima" (from 2000 to 2005).
