= Comala =

Town and municipality in Colima, Mexico

- Town & Municipality
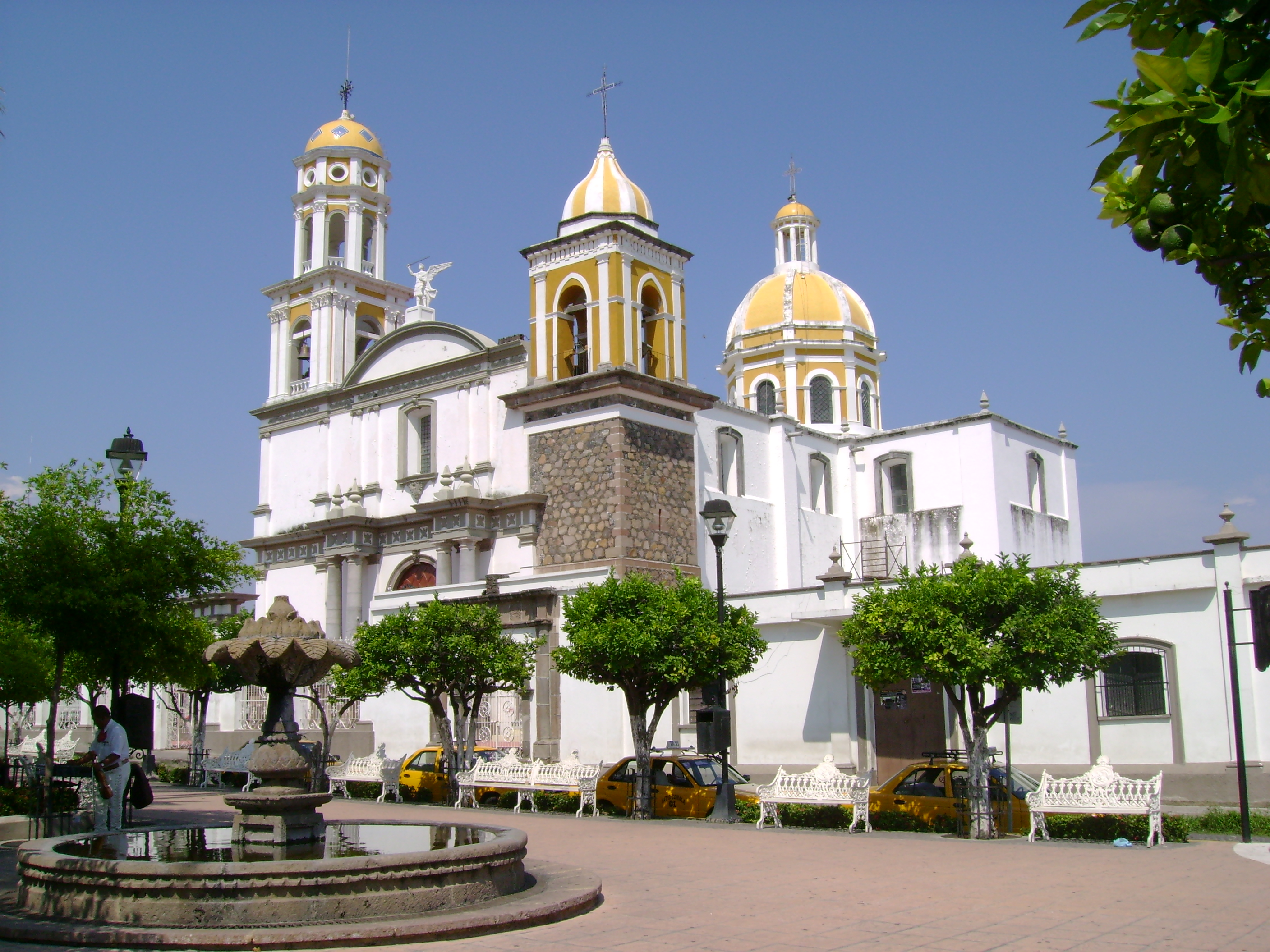
- Main plaza and church

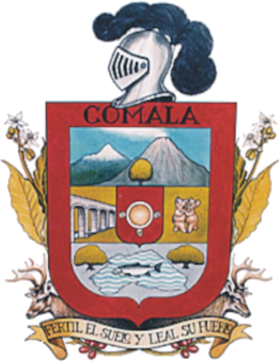
- Coat of arms

- Location in Mexico Comala (Mexico)
- Coordinates: 19°19′15″N 103°45′37″W
- Country: Mexico
- State: Colima
- Founded: 1550s
- Municipal Status: 1856

Government
  - Municipal President: Sergio Agustín Morales Anguiano

Area
  - Municipality: 254 km^{2} (98 sq mi)
- Elevation (of seat): 600 m (2,000 ft)

Population (2010) Municipality
  - Municipality: 20,888
  - Seat: 9,442
- Time zone: UTC-6 (Central (US Central))
- Postal code (of seat): 28450
- Area code: 312
- Website: www.comala.gob.mx (in Spanish)

Comala (Spanish: [koˈmala]) is a town and municipality located in the Mexican state of Colima, near the state capital of Colima, being the northernmost and second smallest municipality in Colima behind Villa de Álvarez. It has been nicknamed the "White Village of America" as the façades of the buildings in town have all been painted white since the 1960s. The historic center of the town was declared a Historic Monument Zone and the town became a Pueblo Mágico in 2002. It is the municipal seat of the Comala Municipality, the local governing authority for over 400 other communities, including the former Nogueras Hacienda, the home of artist Alejandro Rangel Hidalgo.

== Comala municipality ==
The town of Comala is the municipal seat of Comala Municipality, the local governing authority for over four hundred other communities, which together cover a territory of 254 km^{2}. The area was originally called Ajuchitlán or Valley of the Flowers with indigenous settlements located near water flowing down from the Colima Volcano . Aside from the municipal seat, the main communities of the municipality are Suchitlán, Zacualpan and the Cofradía de Suchitlán. The municipal government consists of a municipal president, a general secretary, one officer called a "síndico" and nine officers called "regidores." The municipality borders the municipalities of Cuauhtémoc, Minatitlán and Villa de Álvarez with the state of Jalisco to the north.

As of 2005, there are only 68 people who speak an indigenous language in the municipality. Most speak Nahuatl or Maya with Nahuatl speakers found in the communities of Suchitlán and Zacualpan. From 1980 to 2005, the population of the municipality grew from 15,823 to 19,485 with an average growth rate of over 3.5%. Over 97% of the population is Catholic. There is also a small community of Evangelist Christians.

As of 2005, the municipality had 4,776 residential units with almost all owned by their residents. Basic infrastructure such as running water, street lighting, and sewerage and garbage collection is available to over 90% of the population. However, only 75% have police services and 80% have paved roads. The municipality has seventeen preschools, thirty primary schools, seven middle schools, three high schools and one vocational school. Less than ten percent of the population over the age of 15 is illiterate.

The main road through the municipality is a four lane boulevard that extends from Villa de Alvarez for a length of 6.5 km. Another important road connects the municipal seat with the San Antonio hacienda along with the communities of Suchitlán, Cofradía de Suchitlán, La Nogalera before heading north into Jalisco. The state Carrizalillos-Quesería highway also passes through connected to Zacualpan. There are about twenty km of dirt roads mostly found in the communities of La Caja, El Remudadero, Los Colomos, El Remate and Cofradía de Suchitlán.

The Nogueras Cultural Center belongs to the University of Colima. It features an area dedicated to pre Hispanic ceramics.

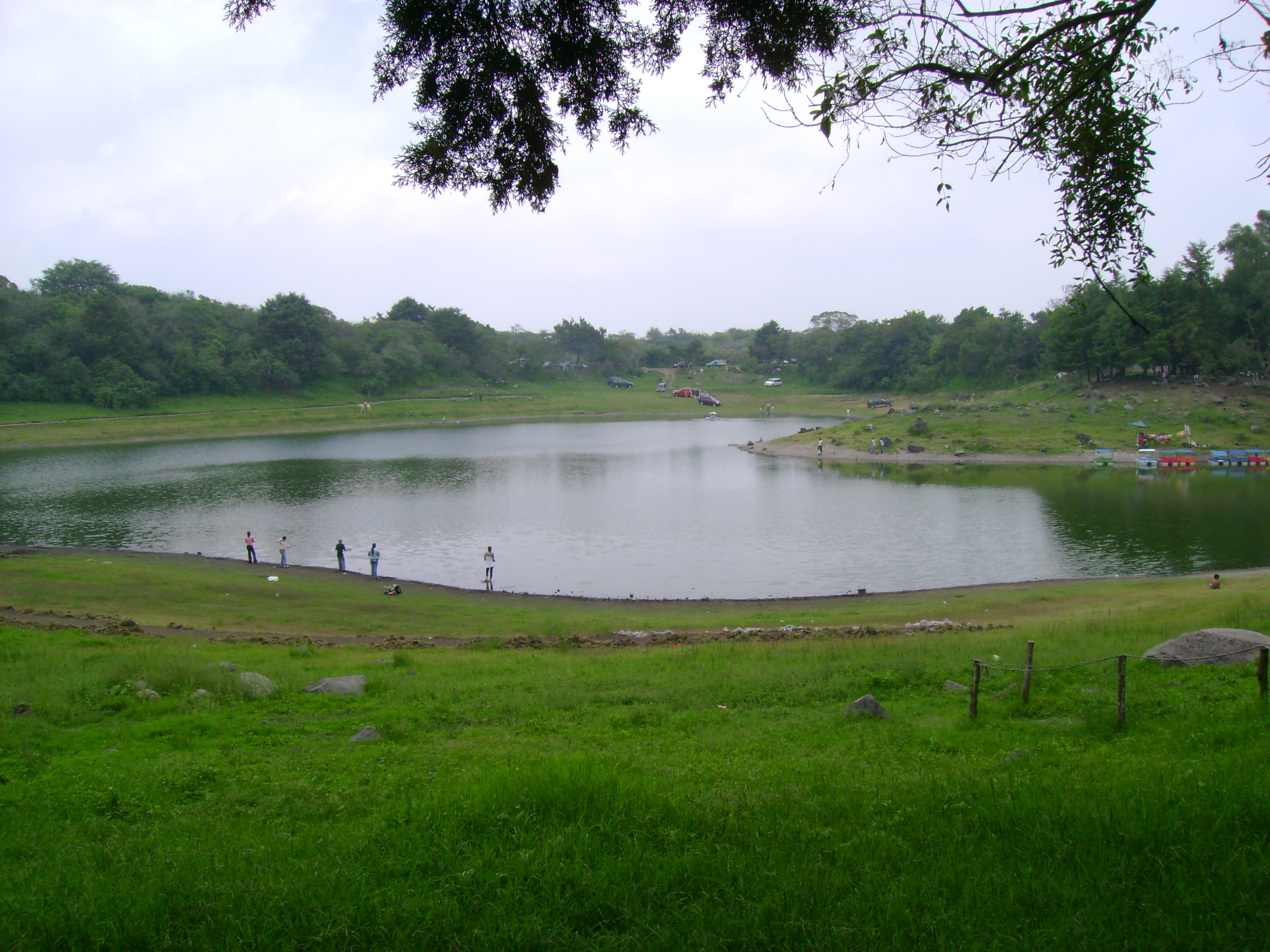
Carrizalillo Lake

Other buildings which have been named historic monuments include the Nogueras Church from the 18th century, the former Nogueras hacienda from the 19th century, the former hacienda of San Antonio and its aqueduct from the 19th century, the parish church from the beginning of the 20th century, the Los Aguajes Bridge from the 20th century, the municipal palace from the 20th century, the Máquinas House from the 20th century, El Fortín from the 20th century and the former Los Colonos hacienda from the 19th century.

The Zacualpan Cultural Center was constructed in 1996 by the state government through the Instituto Colimense de Cultura. It is dedicated to the community history and indigenous identity and includes agrarian implements and documents, arms from the Mexican Revolution, pieces of the old railroad and testimonies from the Cristero War. There are also documents related to the Indio Alonso, who was assassinated here, and photographs related to the medicinal plants in the area.

The Suchitlán Community Museum was established the local community and the municipal government, located in the arches alongside the main garden area of the community. It consists of a single hall with murals of the town, wooden masks, traditional tools, musical instruments and dolls representing traditional dances. The museum also contains documents related to the establishment of the Suchitlán ejido.

Local religious festivals include the feast of the Virgin of Candelaria in Suchitlán on 2 February, Saint James on 25 January and Isidor the Laborer on 15 May in Zacualpan. Suchitlán is known for its traditional dances, such as "morenos," "gallitas," "negros," "sonjaeros" and "del rebozo." Zacualpan's noted dance is the Danza de Conquista. Suchitlán has an annual carnival, celebrated with foods and drink such as nejayote, pinole and sour oranges. The opening ceremony features people with crowns and scepters made of bread, flowers and necklaces who give solemn and emotional speeches. One special guest treated this was Rigoberta Menchú. During festivals in Comala, it is traditional for women to dress up in costumes meant to imitate indigenous dress, and form a procession to announce rodeos called jaripeos as well as an event called Día de los Hijos Ausentes. During the festival of La Caja, dancing horses create a show accompanied by music. In various locations in the municipality, Independence Day is celebrated with horse and foot races by people of all ages. During the Feast of Saint John in Zacualpan, the winners receive prizes such as pigs, hens and turkeys.

Mostly modern pop and norteño music is popular in the municipality. However, it does have nine well-known bands that play traditional music on wind instruments. One event in which this music is commonly played is at bullfights.

== The town ==
Historically, Comala has been a small agricultural village/town. At the beginning of the 20th century, the town had only three streets around the main square. It is also associated with Juan Rulfo's novel Pedro Páramo, although it is not known if Rulfo was referring to the town directly in the novel. The town is still surrounded by papaya, banana, mamey, almond and palm orchards, with orange and palm trees found within for decoration. It is possible to see the Volcano of Colima from the town. Many of the older buildings, especially in the town center have walls made of adobe, and many of the houses have small yards with flowers guarded by iron fences. The historic center of the town was declared a Historic Monument Zone by presidential decree in 1988 and is distinguished by streets paved with river stone. In 1961, the town decided to paint itself white as a way to distinguish itself from the surrounding communities. Today, it is filled with structures with white walls and red tile roofs.

The town is centered on a main square or plaza, dedicated to Benito Juárez, and renovated several times during its history. In the center of the plaza, there is a white kiosk with a stone base topped with a metal roof structure, manufactured in the early 20th century. Surrounding the kiosk are garden areas with palm trees and rose bushes, four fountains in each of the corners and Gothic style iron benches created by Alejandro Rangel Hidalgo. Just off the square on two opposing sides, there are arcades which contain businesses. These businesses sell local products and restaurants serves local cuisine. This includes a dish called tatemado, which is pork in a thick sauce made with guajillo chili peppers, as well as pozole and white menudo .

One important beverage sold here is ponche. It has been made for generations in Comala with at least twenty families currently involved in its production although there are thought to be more who produce it clandestinely. The drink has been given a certification of the name so that products called "ponche de Comala" must be from the area, similar to tequila. Ramon Salazar Salazar was one of the pioneers in the making of ponche, and his son Ramiro Salazar Trujillo is still involved into the craft. Ponche has been made in at least fourteen different flavors with the most traditional being pomegranate, coconut and nuts such as pistachio and almond. Other common flavors include coffee, peanut, tamarind, blackberry, plum, and rompope. The drink has a relatively low alcohol content and is drunk as an aperitif cold or at room temperature. Another beverage is called bate, which is a type of atole served with an ice made with sugar cane.

Also facing the main square on opposite sides are the municipal palace and the parish church. The municipal palace dates from the beginning of the 20th century, on which are a clock and the coat of arms of the municipality. In 2000, the clock in the tower of the municipal palace was replaced but not after some controversy. The building is a historic site, as part of the historic center of the town and there was conflict between municipal authorities and INAH as to whether the work should proceed. In the end, the clock was replaced with the old one preserved by the municipality. The parish church is named San Miguel del Espiritu Santo. The current building was constructed in the early 20th century. The arch that leads into the atrium is older, dating from 1832. One distinguishing feature of the church is that one of its towers is unfinished which can plainly be seen. Between the two towers, there is a white statue of the Archangel Michael.

Comala was named a Pueblo Mágico in 2002 and in 2006 on it has invested about ten million pesos in projects to promote the town image for tourism. The town hosted the 2011 convention of Mexico's forty Pueblos Mágicos to exchange ideas of how to increase tourism.

=== Tourist activities ===
Its main tourist attractions are the "Alejandro Rangel Hidalgo" and the "Eco park", of the University of Colima, as well as the same "Ex hacienda de Nogueras", famous for its "chacuaco" of the extinct sugar mill.

The Nogueras eco-park is dedicated to the preservation of flora and fauna research in the region, where you can see medicinal plants, fruit trees and compost, an area where the use of alternative energy is shown, recycling workshops and environmental training.

In the Alejandro Rangel University Museum, the University of Colima shows the prehispanic ceramic collection selected by the artist Alejandro Rangel Hidalgo. You can also see a sample of personal work as a set designer painter, designer and graphic illustrator.

The Nogueras Cultural Center is located in the building of the Ex Hacienda de Nogueras. Nowadays the restaurant industry is developing.

== Nogueras Hacienda ==
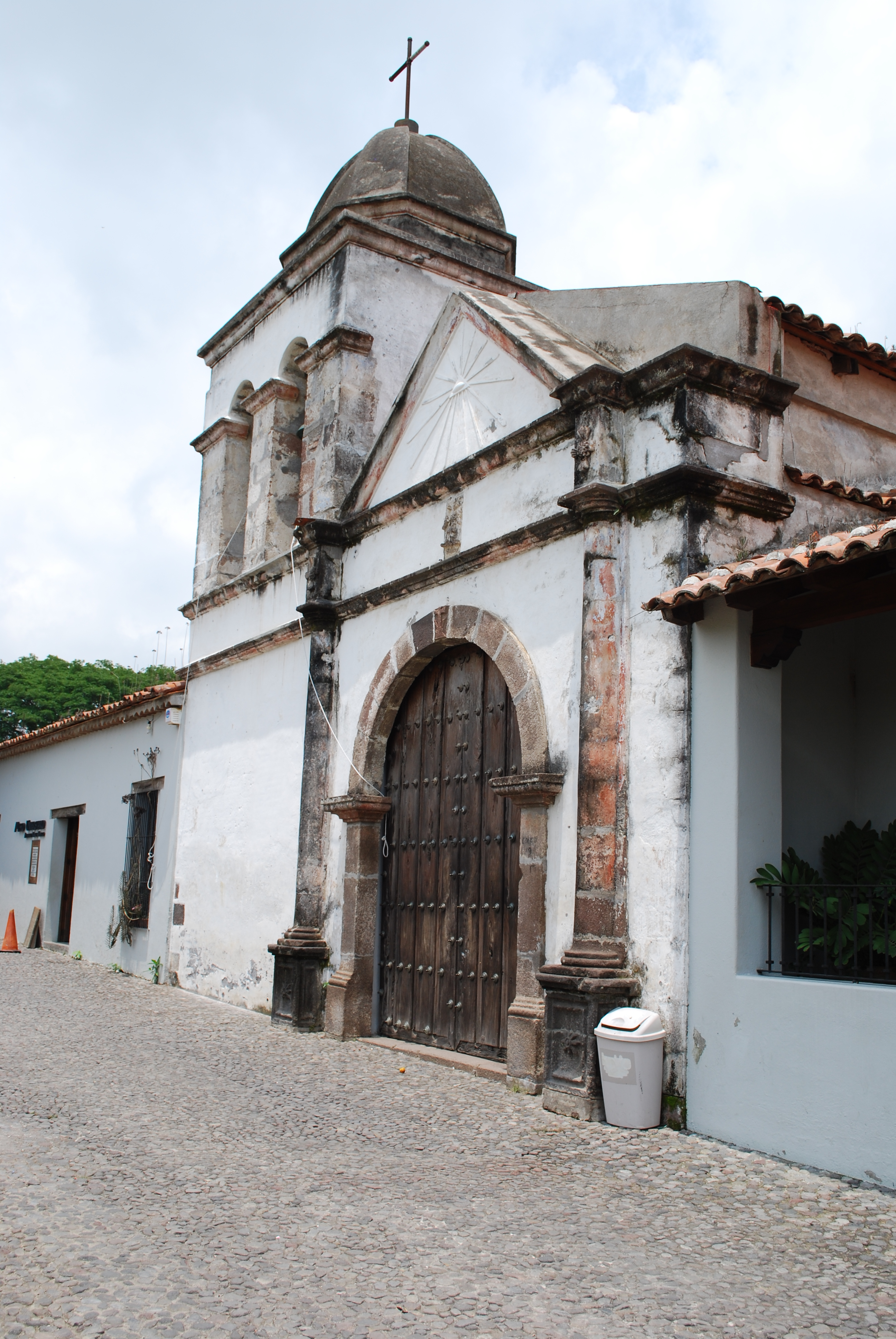
Nogueras chapel

In addition to the historic center of the town of Comala, the most important attraction is the former hacienda of Nogueras, a restored hacienda located just outside the town and belonged to artist Alejandro Rangel Hidalgo.

Nogueras was granted by Hernán Cortés to a now-forgotten general, and over the next centuries the land changed hands several times. The Nogueras estate was founded by the Spanish Juan de Noguera at the beginning of the 18th century; at the time it was one of the most renowned sugar companies in the region.

Currently, the main construction of the Hacienda is part of the University of Colima and its facilities have been remodeled to be a Study Center, an Eco park and the Alejandro Rangel Hidalgo University Museum, where Alejandro Rangel Hidalgo and his painter lived. brothers, the architect Juan Rangel and the engineer Javier Rangel. The Nogueras hacienda chapel was founded by the Franciscans and services are still held here.

By 1873, the hacienda was bankrupt and eventually sold to the Rangel family, who ran the sugar cane mill until the Mexican Revolution. They lost all but a few hectares of the original hacienda, changing from sugar cane to limes, which could be intensively cultivated. After the Revolution Alejandro Rangel inherited the property and helped to keep it running through his talents as an artist. He renovated the hacienda and established a museum to house his collection of antiques, art and furniture. This museum, which still exists, also contains numerous examples of his artwork and furniture designs. Another section of the museum is dedicated to local pre Hispanic ceramics, mostly funerary offerings from shaft tombs. Prominent among these are the "Colima dogs", depictions of xoloizcuintles.

Upon his death, Rangel donated the hacienda to the University of Colima, allowing the art and the pre-Hispanic artifact to remain on the land on which they were created. The university runs the hacienda as a center for archaeological, historical and anthropological studies. The complex is called the Centro Cultural Nogueras with the main house dedicated as the Alejandro Rangel Hidalgo Museum. This museum features Rangel's artwork as well as a large collection of pre Hispanic ceramics from the area. There are also rooms dedicated to the recreation of a traditional hacienda and another dedicated to Rangel's furniture designs. This furniture has made its way to many Mexican embassies and the style is known as Rangelino. The gift shop sells prints of Rangel's work including those made for Christmas cards for UNICEF in the 1960s. The museum also has exhibitions of furniture, ironwork, glass and more from local artisans.

=== Zacualpan ===
It is an indigenous community on the slopes of Cerro Grande, on the edge of the ravine that has carved the Armería River in the sand and rock deposits thrown by the Volcán de Fuego.

There is an ancient tradition in Zacualpan about herbal medicine, a practice that has been inherited by family members as a family, it is interesting to find among the inhabitants those families or women who know the most about it.

It is the only population in the State where communal property is still recognized. It is perhaps also the only case of survival of the ancient tradition of the "cacicas", reason that several towns in the region bears the name of Cihuatlán, "place of women", which made Hernán Cortés believe that he had discovered the mythical land of the Amazons. The last cacica of Zacualpan carried in life the name of Piedra Peña Vázquez (1876-1979).

In front of the garden of the town is the Cultural Center and Community Museum of Zacualpan. There are exhibited archaeological objects of the region, photographs and historical documents of the town, carbines 30-30 and other weapons of the Revolution and the Cristero War, as well as some pieces and sections of rail of the narrow track train that installed the company Colima Lumber Company to exploit the forest wealth of Cerro Grande.

Photographs and personal belongings of the most famous personage of the town, Vicente "El Indio" Alonso, are also exhibited. Half revolutionary, half bandit, the Indian Alonso kept in check the authorities of Colima and the Federal Army for several years.

It was said that Vicente was a sorcerer, that bullets did not hurt him and that every time the army was about to catch him, he and his men turned into goats. He used to steal the switches from the El Remate hydroelectric plant, leaving the city of Colima in the dark while the City Council did not pay the ransom demanded by "the ironworks of the light factory." Killer for some, good thief for many, Vicente Alonso He died in 1917 beheaded by his mistress, Ramona Munguía, who received the reward that the authorities offered for the head of Alonso.

Its main attractions are the spa "Ojo de Agua", the Cerro del Juripichi and "El Rio Grande" also known as Armería or Zacualpan, where an aqueduct was built that provides drinking water to Colima and Villa de Álvarez, with a flow of 250 liters per second, for the benefit of its inhabitants.

== Geography ==
The main mountain area of the municipality is the Cerro Grande. This mountain is at the edge of the Sierra de Manantlán Biosphere Reserve. The mountain offers views of the Colima Valley and the volcanoes. The summit is accessible by automobile. Some areas of the Colima Volcano allow for hiking and even skiing. At the edge of the municipality, where Colima borders Jalisco, there is a large canyon that forms the border.

The Amería River divides the municipality into two regions. The west is more rugged with the Cerro Grande and the Sierra de Manatlán. The southeast is more level as it is part of the Valley of Colima. The two volcanos form part of the municipality's and state's northern border. Other rivers and streams in the municipality include Zacualpan, San Antonio, Los Mezcales, La Caja, San Juan, Nogueras and the Comala River tributaries Reynosa, Suchtlán and Barragana. There are also lakes called Carrizalillos, La Joya, El Obispo, Palo Alto, Las cuatas, El Calabozo, El Epazote, La Escondida, El Jabalí and La María. The Peñitas Dam was constructed in Comala in 1963 to provide water for the municipalities of Colima, Comala, Coquimatlán and Villa de Alvarez. Today the reservoir covers 10,217 hectares and fed by the Armería River.

The south has a hot and fairly humid climate. The north has a more humid climate and the southwest the most humid. The average temperature for the entire municipality is varies between 23C in January and 27C in June. Most rain falls from May until September.

The natural vegetation of the area is low growth rainforest with some species that lose their leaves in the dry season. The most important commercial species are ash, holm oak and a species called librillo. Most forestry occurs on the Cerro Grande. Wildlife consists of mammals such as deer, foxes, coyotes, raccoons, opossums and wild boar. Other species include squirrels, moles, quail, chachalaca, woodpeckers, buzzards, parrots and many other types of birds.

The municipality has a large percentage dedicated to conservation. The Volcano de Colima National Park is partly in the municipality and was decreed in 1936. El Jabalí was created in 1981 as a protected forest and wildlife refuge. The Sierra de Manantlán Biosphere Reserve was created in 1987 and the Las Huertas de Comala is protected area created in 1988.

=== Climate ===
Climate data for Comala
Month	Jan	Feb	Mar	Apr	May	Jun	Jul	Aug	Sep	Oct	Nov	Dec	Year
Mean daily maximum °C (°F)	30.6 (87.1)	31.4 (88.5)	32.1 (89.8)	33.0 (91.4)	33.7 (92.7)	32.4 (90.3)	31.4 (88.5)	31.3 (88.3)	31.0 (87.8)	31.2 (88.2)	31.2 (88.2)	30 (86)	31.6 (88.9)
Mean daily minimum °C (°F)	12.3 (54.1)	12.3 (54.1)	13 (55)	14.3 (57.7)	16.2 (61.2)	18.2 (64.8)	17.9 (64.2)	17.7 (63.9)	17.5 (63.5)	17.3 (63.1)	15.2 (59.4)	13.4 (56.1)	15.4 (59.7)
Average precipitation mm (inches)	23 (0.9)	10 (0.4)	5.1 (0.2)	0 (0)	15 (0.6)	120 (4.8)	240 (9.4)	290 (11.3)	280 (11.1)	110 (4.2)	18 (0.7)	10 (0.4)	1,120 (44.1)
Source: Weatherbase

== History ==
The name means "place of comals", a type of cooking vessel. Comala means place of comals derived from the word comalli with the suffix –an meaning place from Nahuatl. The municipal seal was created by Alvaro Gabrial Rivera Muñoz and chosen during a contest held in 1984. It contains emblematic images related to the municipality such as the volcano, a walnut tree, the former hacienda of San Antonio, the Carrizalillos Lake, a glyph for a comal and the ceramic dog figures that characterize Colima.

The first humans to Colima were estimated to arrive around 3,000 years ago. The area has evidence of Olmec, Nahua, Toltec and Chichimeca habitation or influence. However, after the 12th century, the dominant culture here was the Purépecha culture until the Spanish arrived. The town of Comala has pre Hispanic roots along with neighboring Suchitlán and Zacualtipan in the municipality.

After the Conquest, the Comala area became an encomienda under Bartolomé López in 1527. The area was evangelized by the Franciscans, establishing the chapel of Ajuchitlán. By 1554, the villages of Comala, Suchitlán and Zacualpan were officially established under Spanish rule. Sometime before 1815, it became a semi autonomous Indian Republic with its own governor. It became a municipality in 1820 with Cayetano Pizarro as the first mayor under Spanish law, and again in 1857 under that year's constitution. It has conserved this political organization to the present day.

In 1883, a German businessman by the name of Arnold Vogel established the first coffee plantation in the municipality. This plantation would spur agricultural and industrial development in the area.

The first electrical plant in the state of Colima called El Remate was built in 1906, supplying electricity to Comala, Colima and Villa de Alvarez.

A train line connecting the city of Colima to the Cerro Grande to ship lumber began to function in 1910.

Suchitlán was the site of the area's first ejido in 1918.

The Cristero War in the mid 1920s was particularly divisive in the state of Colima. The municipality has two strongholds of Cristeros, those who opposed the liberal reforms of the area against the Catholic Church. One was located in the Cerro Grande and the other near the edge of the Colima Volcano.

In 1961, the town decided to paint itself white as a way to distinguish itself from the surrounding communities. Today, it is filled with structures with white walls and red tile roofs.

The Vasco de Quiroga School of Social Work was established in the town, the first of its kind in the state. The Escuela de Artesanías con Diseños (School of Handcrafts with Design) was established in 1969, and the Centro Estatal de Menors was established in 1981.

The historic center of the town was declared a Historic Monument Zone by presidential decree in 1988.

In the 1990s, the Zacualpan–Colima aqueduct was built through the municipality to supply water to the capital.

== Economy ==
The municipality has a low level of socioeconomic marginalization. Agriculture employs over 42 percent of the population. Principle crops include corn, tomatoes, sorghum, coffee, sugar cane and animal feed. Other crops include tomatillos, rice, green chili peppers, beans, cucumbers, jicama, limes, mangos, tamarind, avocados, mamey and guava. Livestock is principally of cattle, pigs and domestic fowl with some sheep, goats and horses. There is small scale fishing in the rivers and lakes of the municipality, mostly for carp and bass.

Industry and construction employs just over twenty percent. Industry is limited to handcrafts with the most important workshop being the "Artesanías Pueblo Blanco" which makes furniture. There are also some coffee and dairy processing along with the production of some construction materials. Handcrafts include baskets, carved wooden masks for traditional dances, palm frond hands, tarrallas, chiquihuites and comals.

Thousands of visitors come each year to the municipal seat and some of the natural attractions around it. Hiking is popular in the areas on and around the Cerro Grande and the slopes of the volcano. Tourism is supported by a number of restaurants serving local dishes and hotels.

Just over 35% commerce, services and tourism. Comala is the second most important tourist destination in the state after Manzanillo, with an average 400,000 visitors each year. In addition to the historic center of the town of Comala, the most important attraction is the former hacienda of Nogueras, a restored hacienda located just outside the town and belonged to artist Alejandro Rangel Hidalgo.

Tourist attractions include the former hacienda of San Antonio, the Jabalí, La María and Carrizalillos Lakes. These have hotel and restaurant services along with boating and fishing at the lakes. La Maria Lake is surrounded by oaks and pines and has cabins and restaurants. The El Remate reserve is part of a project to protect the cultural history and ecology of the area while promoting it for tourism. Here the first electrical power plant for the state was constructed. There is a retreat called the "Centro de Reflexión" in Suchitlán, construction along the ravine of the Suchitlán River. It can accommodate 100 people, with special dining options as well as motivational speeches. It is located near the city of Colima in an area chosen for its climate and natural landscapes.

== See also ==
- Pueblo Mágico
