= Villa de Álvarez Municipality =

Villa de Álvarez
- Municipality
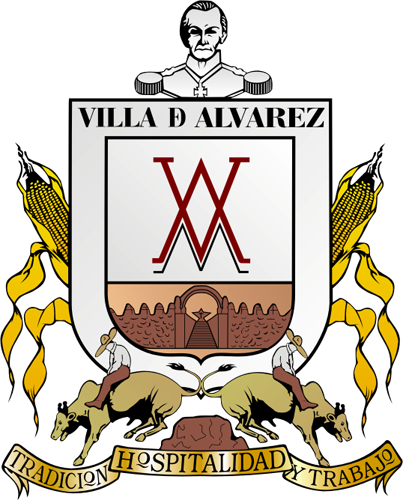
- Coat of arms

- Municipality of Villa de Álvarez in Colima

- Location in Mexico
- Coordinates: 19°21′N 104°5′W
- Country: Mexico
- State: Colima
- Municipal seat: Villa de Álvarez

Area
  - Total: 428.4 km^{2} (165.4 sq mi)

Population (2005)
  - Total: 100,121

Villa de Álvarez (Spanish pronunciation: [ˈbiʝa ðe ˈalβaɾes]) is a municipality in the Mexican state of Colima, being the smallest but most densely populated municipality in Colima. The municipal seat lies at Villa de Álvarez.

The municipality covers an area of 428.4 km^{2}, and, in 2005, reported a total population of 100,121.

The municipality of Villa de Álvarez is located in the north-central zone of the state of Colima. between the geographic coordinates 19°13'-19°26' north latitude and 103°38'-104°02' west longitude and its altitude fluctuates between 400 and 1800 meters above sea level. It borders the municipality of Minatitlán to the northwest, the municipality of Comala to the north, the municipality of Cuauhtémoc to the northeast, the municipality of Colima to the southeast and the municipality of Coquimatlán to the south.

== Orography-Hydrography ==
On the East side is located the least rugged surface with part of a valley, right where the municipal seat is located. Most of the territory has rugged and mountainous geography, in the area west of the Armería River whose main elevations are: Cerro del Rincón de Almoloyan, Cerro de El Chino and part of Cerro El Barrigón (at the top of which there is a crater that fills with water during the rainy season, forming a beautiful lagoon) located on the north side, Cerro de Culuapan, where there is an enormous rock that seems to threaten the nearby population of the same name.

- The Armería River crosses the municipality from north to south; its tributaries are the rivers: Picachos, Comala and San Antonio. The volume of runoff water is concentrated in Peñitas.
- The Colima River on the west bank establishes the boundary with the municipalities of Colima and Cuauhtémoc.
- The following lagoons are located in the municipality: La Grande, Pastores, to the northwest that of Carrizal, Las Cuatas, and El Pozo.
- The municipality has some streams such as: El Seco, Tecomala, Del Diablo, San Palmar, Agua Dulce, and the Pereira that crosses the municipal seat. There are also some boards, including the Simón Macías.

The climates of the municipality, due to the level of humidity, are sub-humid, and in relation to their temperature, warm; In the center and north of the municipality there is a warm sub-humid climate with rains in summer; and to the northwest it is also warm sub-humid and semi-warm sub-humid, with rains during the summer. The average annual temperature is 23.7 °C, and the average rainfall is 1,193.8 cubic millimeters, with rainfall, which during the months of May, June, July, August and September.

In the municipal territory there are the following plant varieties, predominating in the areas of the communities of Agua Dulce and Pueblo Nuevo: mojo, parota, higuera, cóbano, hebillo, rosamorada, chicozapote, cuahuayote (bonnet), cabeza de negro, anona, tescalama, colorín, guásima, huizcolote, cuastecomate, chamizo, mesquite, huizache, palma real, cactus; as well as others
