= Minatitlán, Colima =

Minatitlán
- City
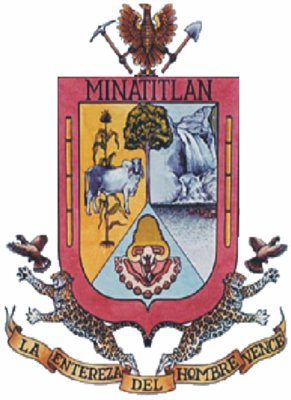
- Coat of arms

- Location within Colima Location within Mexico
- Coordinates: 19°23′N 104°3′W
- Country: Mexico
- State: Colima
- Municipality: Minatitlán

Government
  - Municipal president: Héctor Bautista Vázquez (PRI)

Population (1995)
  - Total: 4,009
- Time zone: UTC-6 (CST)
- Website: (in Spanish) Ayuntamiento de Minatitlán, Colima

Minatitlán is a town in the Mexican state of Colima. It serves as the municipal seat of the surrounding Minatitlán Municipality.

== Economy ==
Minatitlán has a significant agricultural economy. The main crops grown include coffee beans, corn, mangos, green tomatoes, rice, jalapeños, oranges, sugar cane, mamey sapote, and other fruit trees. There's also a large iron mine located at the Astilla mount, named "Peña Colorada".

== Climate ==
Climate data for Minatitlán (1991–2020)
Month	Jan	Feb	Mar	Apr	May	Jun	Jul	Aug	Sep	Oct	Nov	Dec	Year
Record high °C (°F)	37.0 (98.6)	38.0 (100.4)	39.0 (102.2)	39.5 (103.1)	40.0 (104.0)	48.0 (118.4)	38.0 (100.4)	40.0 (104.0)	43.0 (109.4)	39.0 (102.2)	37.0 (98.6)	39.0 (102.2)	48.0 (118.4)
Mean daily maximum °C (°F)	28.9 (84.0)	30.1 (86.2)	31.6 (88.9)	33.1 (91.6)	34.1 (93.4)	32.9 (91.2)	30.8 (87.4)	31.1 (88.0)	30.4 (86.7)	30.5 (86.9)	30.0 (86.0)	29.2 (84.6)	31.1 (88.0)
Daily mean °C (°F)	20.5 (68.9)	21.5 (70.7)	22.5 (72.5)	23.9 (75.0)	25.8 (78.4)	25.6 (78.1)	24.6 (76.3)	25.0 (77.0)	24.2 (75.6)	23.9 (75.0)	22.5 (72.5)	21.1 (70.0)	23.4 (74.1)
Mean daily minimum °C (°F)	12.2 (54.0)	12.9 (55.2)	13.5 (56.3)	14.8 (58.6)	17.5 (63.5)	18.3 (64.9)	18.3 (64.9)	18.9 (66.0)	18.1 (64.6)	17.2 (63.0)	15.0 (59.0)	12.9 (55.2)	15.8 (60.4)
Record low °C (°F)	1.0 (33.8)	3.0 (37.4)	4.0 (39.2)	3.0 (37.4)	6.0 (42.8)	4.0 (39.2)	1.0 (33.8)	1.0 (33.8)	1.5 (34.7)	8.0 (46.4)	4.0 (39.2)	4.0 (39.2)	1.0 (33.8)
Average precipitation mm (inches)	12.9 (0.51)	34.7 (1.37)	12.4 (0.49)	0.9 (0.04)	8.3 (0.33)	156.4 (6.16)	284.0 (11.18)	318.8 (12.55)	355.8 (14.01)	172.5 (6.79)	26.1 (1.03)	12.7 (0.50)	1,395.5 (54.94)
Average precipitation days (≥ 0.1 mm)	1.1	1.6	0.5	0.1	0.5	8.0	15.3	14.4	14.4	7.1	1.4	0.7	65.1
Source: Servicio Meteorologico Nacional
