= Ixtlahuacán Municipality =

Ixtlahuacán
- Municipality
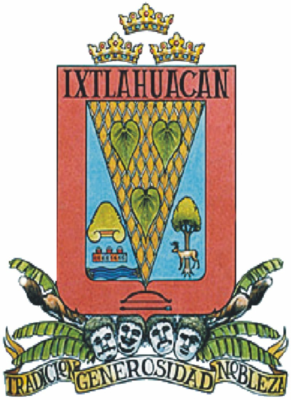
- Coat of arms

- Municipality of Ixtlahuacán in Colima

- Location in Mexico
- Coordinates: 18°59′52″N 103°44′09″W
- Country: Mexico
- State: Colima
- Municipal seat: Ixtlahuacán

Area
  - Total: 468.7 km^{2} (181.0 sq mi)

Population (2005)
  - Total: 2,484

Ixtlahuacán is a municipality in the Mexican state of Colima, being the least populous and most sparsely populated municipality in Colima. The municipal seat lies at Ixtlahuacán. The municipality covers an area of 468.7 km^{2}.

As of 2005, the municipality had a total population of 2,484.

Its residents are called Ixtlahuaqueños. It is one of the most remote municipios of the state. It is located between Tecoman and the city of Colima

== Climate ==
Climate data for Ixtlahuacan
Month	Jan	Feb	Mar	Apr	May	Jun	Jul	Aug	Sep	Oct	Nov	Dec	Year
Mean daily maximum °C (°F)	33.6 (92.5)	34 (93)	34 (93)	34.3 (93.7)	34.9 (94.8)	34.7 (94.5)	34.5 (94.1)	34.4 (93.9)	33.6 (92.5)	34.1 (93.4)	34.3 (93.7)	34 (93)	34.2 (93.6)
Mean daily minimum °C (°F)	17.1 (62.8)	17.0 (62.6)	17.3 (63.1)	18.6 (65.5)	20.6 (69.1)	22.6 (72.7)	21.6 (70.9)	22.3 (72.1)	22.1 (71.8)	21.6 (70.9)	19.8 (67.6)	18.4 (65.1)	19.9 (67.8)
Average precipitation mm (inches)	10 (0.4)	5.1 (0.2)	5.1 (0.2)	5.1 (0.2)	10 (0.4)	99 (3.9)	150 (6)	180 (7)	200 (7.7)	89 (3.5)	10 (0.4)	13 (0.5)	770 (30.2)
Source: Weatherbase
