= Armería =

Coordinates: 18.936°N 103.965°W

- Municipality
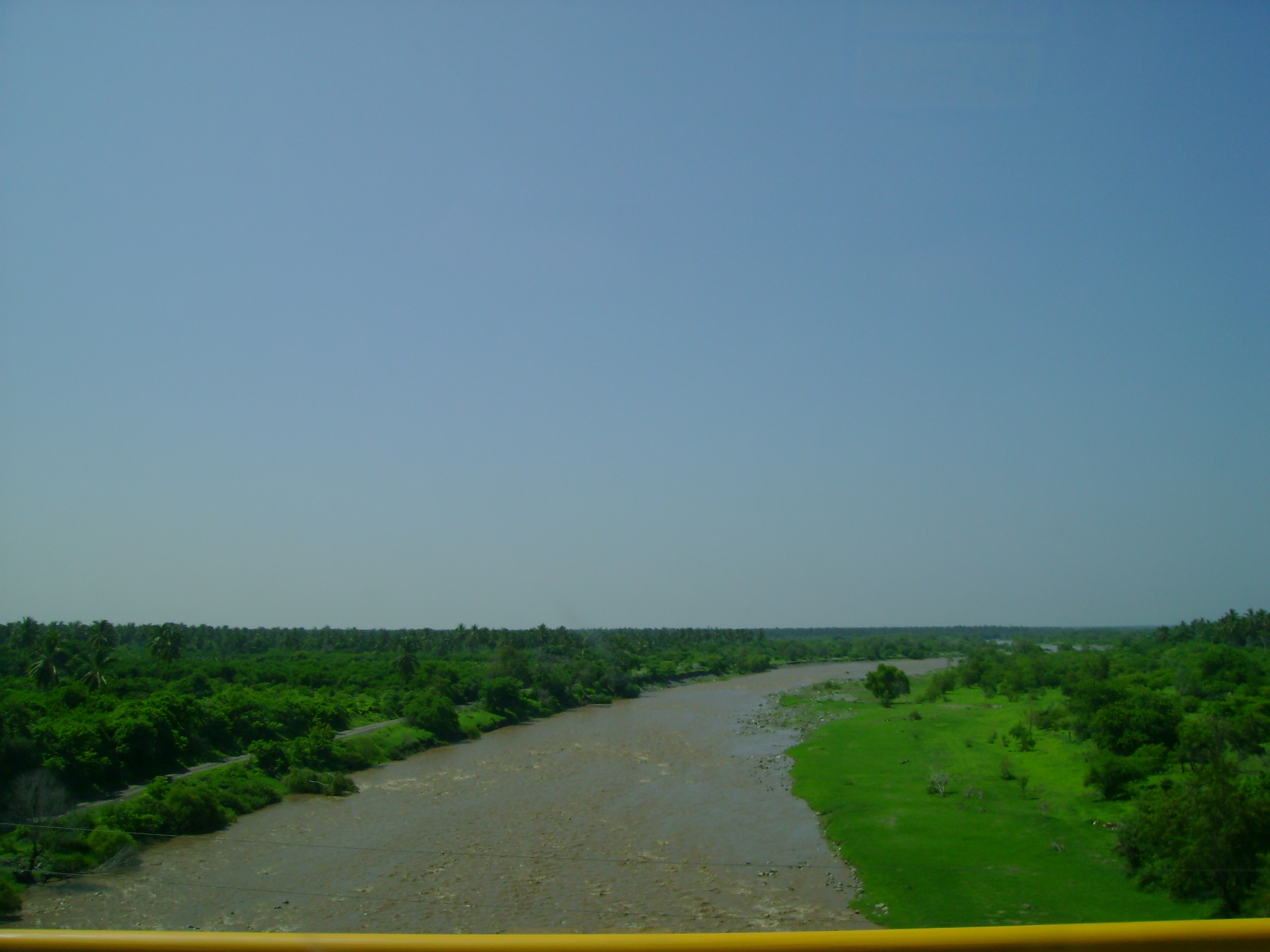
- Río Armería

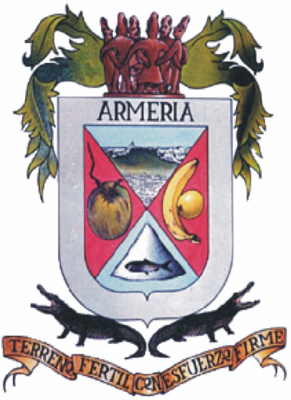
- Coat of arms
- Motto: La tierra fertil con el esfuerzo firme
- Municipality of Armería in Colima
- Country: Mexico
- State: Colima
- Municipal seat: Ciudad de Armería
- Municipality created: 1967

Government
  - Municipal president: Diana Zepeda Figueroa

Area
  - Total: 341.6 km^{2} (131.9 sq mi)

Population (2010)
  - Municipality: 28,695
  - Seat: 15,923
- Time zone: UTC-6 (CST)
- INEGI code: 001
- Website: (in Spanish) Ayuntamiento de Armería

Armería is a municipality in the south-central part of the Mexican state of Colima. Ciudad de Armería is a city and the seat of Armería municipality. The municipality reported 29,599 inhabitants in the 2015 census and has an area of 341.60 km^{2} (131.89 sq mi). Its municipal seat is Ciudad de Armería.

== Geography ==
=== Climate ===
Climate data for Armería (1991–2020)
Month	Jan	Feb	Mar	Apr	May	Jun	Jul	Aug	Sep	Oct	Nov	Dec	Year
Record high °C (°F)	40.0 (104.0)	39.5 (103.1)	43.0 (109.4)	42.5 (108.5)	42.0 (107.6)	42.0 (107.6)	42.0 (107.6)	42.0 (107.6)	41.0 (105.8)	42.0 (107.6)	42.0 (107.6)	40.0 (104.0)	43.0 (109.4)
Mean daily maximum °C (°F)	33.3 (91.9)	33.8 (92.8)	34.4 (93.9)	34.9 (94.8)	35.8 (96.4)	36.0 (96.8)	35.8 (96.4)	35.5 (95.9)	34.5 (94.1)	34.7 (94.5)	34.4 (93.9)	33.6 (92.5)	34.7 (94.5)
Daily mean °C (°F)	25.0 (77.0)	25.1 (77.2)	25.2 (77.4)	25.8 (78.4)	27.7 (81.9)	29.6 (85.3)	29.6 (85.3)	29.3 (84.7)	28.7 (83.7)	28.6 (83.5)	27.5 (81.5)	25.8 (78.4)	27.3 (81.1)
Mean daily minimum °C (°F)	16.6 (61.9)	16.3 (61.3)	16.0 (60.8)	16.7 (62.1)	19.6 (67.3)	23.1 (73.6)	23.3 (73.9)	23.1 (73.6)	23.0 (73.4)	22.5 (72.5)	20.6 (69.1)	18.1 (64.6)	19.9 (67.8)
Record low °C (°F)	7.5 (45.5)	9.5 (49.1)	7.5 (45.5)	10.0 (50.0)	10.0 (50.0)	13.0 (55.4)	12.0 (53.6)	13.0 (55.4)	2.25 (36.05)	12.0 (53.6)	10.0 (50.0)	7.5 (45.5)	2.25 (36.05)
Average precipitation mm (inches)	22.3 (0.88)	13.1 (0.52)	7.3 (0.29)	0.0 (0.0)	7.6 (0.30)	102.3 (4.03)	149.2 (5.87)	182.7 (7.19)	228.4 (8.99)	136.2 (5.36)	36.2 (1.43)	11.1 (0.44)	896.4 (35.29)
Average precipitation days (≥ 0.1 mm)	2.0	0.9	0.3	0.2	1.2	10.8	13.3	15.6	15.7	7.8	2.9	1.4	72.1
Source: Servicio Meteorológico Nacional

=== Ciudad de Armería ===
Ciudad de Armería (Armería) is a city in the south-central part of the Mexican state of Colima. It serves as the municipal seat for the surrounding Armería Municipality. With a 2005 census population of 14,091, Ciudad de Armería is the fifth-largest community in the state in terms of population.

=== Communities ===
Armeria has the following communities:

- Los Reyes Zorrillos
- Cofradia de Juarez
- El Paraiso Balneario
- Cuyutlan
- Ninguno Rastro Municipal
- El Bajio
- San Jose
- Rincon de Lopez
- Gerardo Chavez
- Ninguno Club Cinegetico
- Augusto Gomez Villanueva Coalatilla
- El Manguito

== Demographics ==
Although only around 100 Indigenous people, they speak Purepecha and Nahuatl.

Historical population
Year	Pop.	±%
1910		—
1921		—
1930		—
1940		—
1950		—
1960		—
1970		—
1980	21,847	—
1990	27,782	+27.2%
2000	28,574	+2.9%
2010	28,695	+0.4%
2015	29,599	+3.2%
Source: INEGI,
