= Manzanillo Municipality, Colima =

Manzanillo
- Municipality
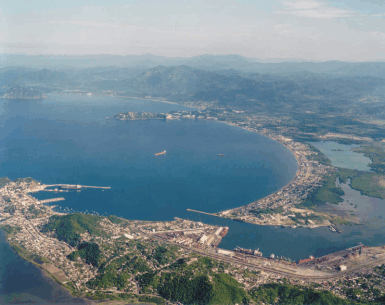
- Coastline

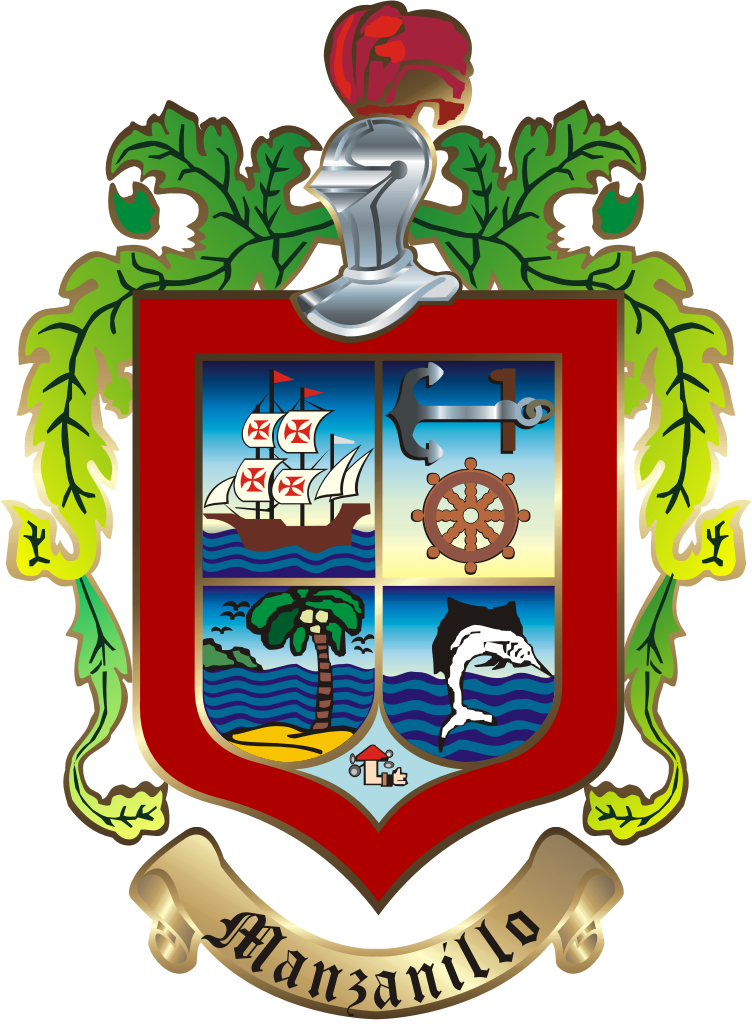
- Coat of arms

- Municipality of Manzanillo in Colima

- Location in Mexico
- Coordinates: 19°3′N 104°19′W
- Country: Mexico
- State: Colima
- Municipal seat: Manzanillo

Area
  - Total: 1,578.3 km^{2} (609.4 sq mi)

Population (2010)
  - Total: 161,420

Manzanillo is a municipality in the Mexican state of Colima, being the largest, most populous, and westernmost municipality in Colima. The municipal seat lies at Manzanillo. The municipality covers an area of 1,578.3 km^{2} (609.4 sq mi), which also includes the remote Revillagigedo Islands.

As of 2010, the municipality had a total population of 161,420.

== Government ==
=== Municipal presidents ===
Before Manzanillo was declared a municipality, there were governments headed by prefects and political directors
Term	Municipal president	Political party	Note
1854-1867	Ramón Esparza		Sole mayor
1867-1868	Ponciano Ruiz		
1868-1871	Casimiro Arzac Arana		Political director
1871	Celedonio R. Cárdenas		Political prefect
1871-1872	José Ramírez		Political prefect
1872-1873	Celedonio R. Cárdenas		Political prefect
One-year term governments, 1873-1946 There were no presidents of the City Council until June 20, 1873, when by instructions of the governor of Colima Francisco Santa Cruz, through decree 147 published in the Official State Gazette, the municipality of Manzanillo was erected. Eight days after the statute was announced, elections were called to elect the first representative of the municipal administration, resulting in the election of businessman Ponciano Ruiz, taking office in August of the same year. From then until 1946, the terms of government of the municipal presidents were one year and with the possibility of being reelected
1873	Ponciano Ruiz		
1873-1874	Plácido Gómez Palencia		
1874-1876	Celedonio R. Cárdenas		
1876-1877	J. Jesús Alcaraz		
1877-1878	Pánfilo Dueñas		
1878-1879	José Castillo		
1879	Carlos M. Arana		
1879-1880	Carlos Acevedo		
1880-1881	Francisco Palencia		
1881	Candelario de la Torre		
1881-1882	Remigio Parra		
1882	Candelario de la Torre		
1882-1883	Ponciano Ruiz		
1883	Francisco Palencia		
1883-1884	Carlos Barreto		
1884-1886	José María Bazán		
1886-1887	Fernando Solórzano		
1887-1888	José María Bazán		
1888-1889	Remigio Parra		
1889-1890	Basilio Castell Figueroa		
1890-1892	Remigio Parra		
1892-1893	Aniceto Virgen		
1893	Pedro Ramírez		
1893	José Refugio Sánchez		
1893-1894	Teodoro Padilla		
1894-1895	Juan Torres		
1895-1896	Teodoro Padilla		
1896-1897	Francisco R. Ramírez		
1897	Teodoro Padilla		
1897-1898	Francisco R. Ramírez		
1898	Blas Ruiz		
1898-1899	Donaciano Corona		
1899-1901	Basilio Castell Figueroa		
1901-1903	Teodoro Padilla		
1903-1905	Juan Bejarano		
1905-1909	Emiliano García		
1909-1911	Manuel Negrete		
1911	José María Bueno		
1911-1912	Leoncio Figueroa		
1912	Félix J. Piz		
1912-1913	Teodoro Padilla		
1913-1914	José María Sánchez Díaz		
1914	Luis G. Sánchez		
1914-1915	Salvador F. Reséndiz		
1915-1916	Luis G. Sánchez		
1916-1917	Luis Mancilla		
1917-1918	José H.Moreno		
1918	A. A. Higinio Pérez Ochoa		
1918-1919	Arturo Vargas		
1919-1920	A. A. Higinio Pérez Ochoa		
1920-1921	Isaac R. Chávez		
1921-1922	Eusebio Zaragoza		
1922-1923	Isaac R. Chávez		
1923	Víctor Sevilla Ramírez		
1923-1924	Ricardo Ruelas		
1924	José Casillas		
1924-1925	Marcelino Gallardo		
1925-1926	Herminio Barreda Mora		
1926	José María Salazar Ureña		
1926-1928	Benjamín Rodríguez Lozano		
1928	Felipe Rocha		
1928-1929	Enrique Silva		
1929-1930	Benjamín Rodríguez Solórzano	PNR	
1930-1931	Ricardo Véjar	PNR	
1931	Evaristo Brizuela	PNR	
1931-1932	José J. Parra	PNR	
1932-1933	Crescenciano Gallardo	PNR	
1933-1934	Miguel Saucedo	PNR	
1934-1935	Domingo Ramírez Chávez	PNR	
1935-1936	Pantaleón Hernández	PNR	
1936-1937	José Casillas Ugarte	PNR	
1937-1938	Carlos Magallón	PNR	
1938-1939	Librado R. García	PNR; PRM	
1939-1940	Saturnino Rodríguez Ortiz	PRM	
1940	Leonardo Jaramillo	PRM	
1941	Juan Pérez Arce	PRM	
1942	Homobono Llamas García	PRM	
1943-1945	Francisco Pizano Hernández	PRM	
1945	Herminio Barreda Mora	PRM	
Triennial governments (1946-present) Starting in 1946, the period of government of the municipal presidents was raised to three years. However, for 1955 adjustments were made so that the terms of the municipal administrations were concurrent with those of the state governor. At this stage, several elected presidents requested a license to compete for other positions of popular election, for which they had to be replaced in their position, except for Professor Alberto Larios Gaytán, who died in office
1946-1948	Fernando Solórzano Alatorre	PRI	
1949-1951	Herminio Barreda Mora	PRI	
1952-1954	Alfredo Woodward Téllez	PRI	
1954	Daniel Sánchez Velasco	PRI	Acting municipal president
1955	Felipe Guzmán Mesina	PRI	
1956-1958	Javier Mata Vargas	PRI	
1959-1960	Miguel Sandoval Sevilla	PRI	
1961	Manuel Bonilla Valle	PRI	
1962-1964	Benito Rincón López	PRI	
1965-1967	Luis García Castillo	PRI	
1968-1970	Arturo Castro Guízar	PRI	
1971-1973	Ramón Navarro Hernández	PRI	
1974-1976	Aquileo Díaz Virgen	PRI	
1977-1979	Jorge Armando Gaytán Gudiño	PRI	
1980-1982	Alberto Larios Gaytán	PRI	Died in office
1982	Humberto Ramírez Palacios	PRI	Acting municipal president
1983-1986	Elías Zamora Verduzco	PRI	
1986	Ramón Chulines Maldonado	PRI	
1986-1988	Cecilio Lepe Bautista	PRI	
1989-1991	Alejandro Meillón Sánchez	PRI	
1992-1994	Porfirio Gaytán Gudiño	PRI	
1995-1997	José Luis Navarrete Caudillo	PRI	
1998-2000	Martha Leticia Sosa Govea	PAN	
2001-2003	Rogelio Humberto Rueda Sánchez	PRI	
??/04/2003-14/10/2003	Sara Patricia Garibay Velasco	PRI	Acting municipal president
15/10/2003-18/05/2006	Nabor Ochoa López	PAN	
19/05/2006-14/10/2006	Alicia Mandujano Contreras	PAN	Acting municipal president
2006-2009	Virgilio Mendoza Amezcua	PAN	
25/05/2009-14/10/2009	María Isabel Rivera Solórzano	PAN	Acting municipal president
2009-2012	Nabor Ochoa López	PRI	
21/01/2012-14/10/2012	Rosario Yeme López	PRI	Acting municipal president
15/10/2012-08/03/2015	Virgilio Mendoza Amezcua	PAN	He applied for a temporary leave
08/03/2015-14/10/2015	J. Antonio Álvarez Macías	PAN	Acting municipal president
15/10/2015-08/03/2018	Gabriela Benavides Cobos	PAN	She applied for a temporary leave to run for the Senate
08/03/2018-14/10/2018	Enrique García	PVEM	Acting municipal president
15/10/2018-31/03/2021	Griselda Martínez Martínez	Morena	She applied for a temporary leave, to run for reelection
01/04/2021-2021	Rosacruz Rodríguez Pizano	Morena	Acting municipal president
15/10/2021-14-10-2024	Griselda Martínez Martínez	Morena	She was reelected on 06/06/2021
15/10/2024-	Rosa María Bayardo Cabrera	Morena; PVEM; PT	Coalition "Sigamos Haciendo Historia en Colima" (Let's Keep Making History)
