= Villa de Álvarez =

Villa de Álvarez, Colima
- City
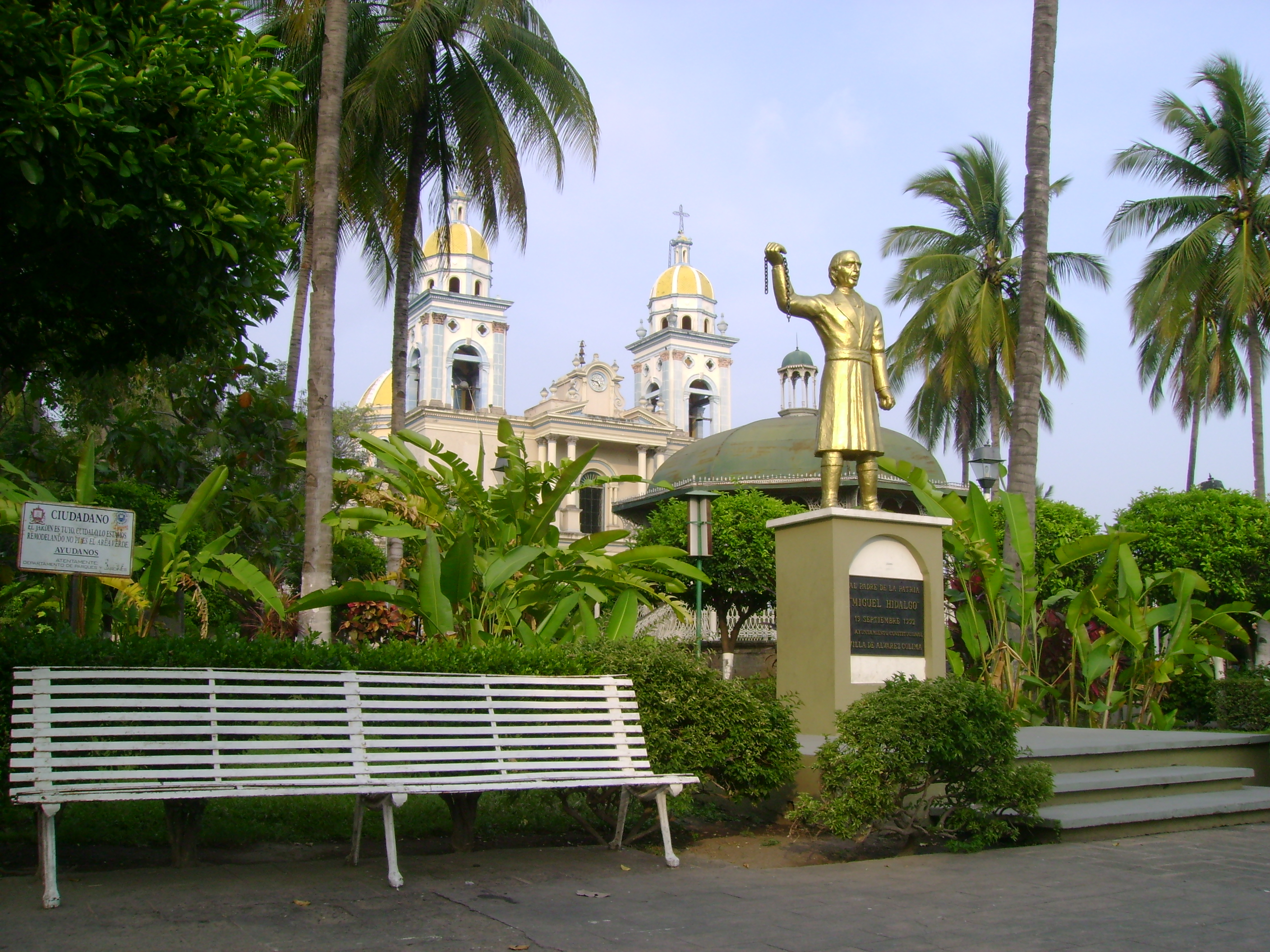
- Villa de Álvarez

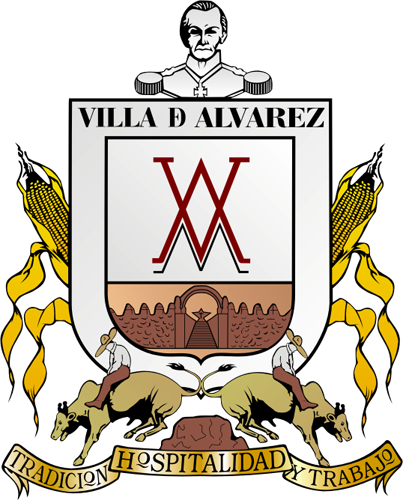
- Seal

- Location in Mexico Villa de Álvarez, Colima (Mexico)
- Coordinates: 19°16′2″N 103°44′16″W
- Country: Mexico
- State: Colima
- Municipality: Villa de Álvarez

Population (2010)
  - Total: 117,600

Ciudad de Villa de Álvarez is a city in the Mexican state of Colima. It is the municipal seat of Villa de Álvarez municipality. The city is adjacent to the northwest side of the state capital city of Colima and the two can be considered as "twin cities", with Ciudad de Villa de Álvarez having a 2005 census population of 97,701 and Colima having a population of 123,597. They are both part of the Colima-Villa de Álvarez metropolitan area, which includes the population of Colima municipality (132,237) and Villa de Álvarez municipality (100,121). The city and the municipality of Villa de Álvarez both rank third in the state in their respective categories in population, behind only Colima itself and Manzanillo. Villa de Álvarez municipality has an area of 428.4 km^{2} (165.4 sq mi).

== See also ==
- 2003 Colima earthquake
