= Same-sex marriage in Colima =

Same-sex marriage has been legal in Colima since 12 June 2016. The Congress of Colima passed a same-sex marriage bill by 24 votes to 0 on 25 May 2016. It was signed by Governor José Ignacio Peralta, and published as law in the state's official journal on 11 June. It came into effect the next day, making Colima the seventh Mexican state to open marriage to same-sex couples. Colima had previously recognized same-sex civil unions, but this "separate but equal" treatment was declared discriminatory by the Supreme Court of Justice of the Nation on 17 June 2015. Congress had passed a civil union bill in July 2013 but repealed it in May 2016 shortly before the legalization of same-sex marriage.

== Civil unions ==
On 4 July 2013, the Congress of Colima approved an amendment to article 147 of the State Constitution establishing same-sex civil unions (Spanish: enlace conyugal, pronounced [enˈlase koɲɟʝuˈɣal]). Within thirty days, seven of Colima's ten municipalities had approved the constitutional change. The legislation was signed by Governor Mario Anguiano Moreno, and went into effect on 4 August 2013. Subsequently, a group of activists filed a lawsuit challenging the reform, arguing that providing civil unions to same-sex couples and marriage to opposite-sex couples was discrimination on the basis of sexual orientation. On 18 March 2015, a district court judge declared that this "separate but equal" treatment was discriminatory and unconstitutional. The decision also held that section 201 of the Civil Code, which defined gendered roles for men and women, was discriminatory and reiterated that adoption open to heterosexual married couples must also be open to same-sex couples. Shortly after the ruling, a local LGBT advocacy group announced it would help any couple who had joined in a civil union to receive a marriage license. The state appealed the ruling, and on 17 June 2015 the Supreme Court of Justice of the Nation agreed that the "separate but equal" union laws violated the Constitution of Mexico. The state government subsequently announced that it would repeal article 147 and pass a same-sex marriage law.

Congress unanimously repealed the civil union provisions on 5 May 2016. The ability to enter into a civil union was closed off on 29 May, the date the law came into force. No further unions are granted in Colima, and couples may retain their status as civil partners or convert their union into a recognized marriage.

== Same-sex marriage ==
=== Background ===
On 22 January 2013, a same-sex couple applied for a marriage license in Cuauhtémoc. After a team of lawyers reviewed the application, Mayor Indira Vizcaíno Silva granted the first marriage license on 27 February. The following month, she stated that a local survey had shown that eight out of ten residents supported the municipality's decision to issue marriage licenses to same-sex couples. Officials solemnized a second same-sex marriage, and the first lesbian union, on 25 March. A third marriage, involving a lesbian couple, was performed on 4 April, also in Cuauhtémoc. At the time, city officials announced that an additional twenty to thirty marriages were planned. In June 2013, Judge Rosa Vargas Valle of the Second District Court ruled that the Colima Civil Code was unconstitutional in limiting marriage to opposite-sex couples.

=== Legislative action ===
On 4 July 2013, alongside the passage of civil unions, the Congress also approved an amendment to article 147 of the Colima Constitution defining marriage as the "union of a man and a woman", thus constitutionally banning same-sex marriage. Congress voted unanimously to repeal article 147 on 5 May 2016, ending civil unions and removing the same-sex marriage ban. The bill was published in the official journal on 28 May, and went into force the following day.

Following the Supreme Court's June 2015 ruling that the "separate but equal" union laws were discriminatory and unconstitutional, the Party of the Democratic Revolution (PRD) submitted a same-sex marriage bill to Congress. The law would ensure that married same-sex couples enjoy the same rights, benefits and responsibilities as married opposite-sex couples, including tax benefits, inheritance, immigration rights, property rights and adoption rights, among others. A vote on the legislation was scheduled for May 2016. The bill was approved on 25 May in a unanimous 24–0 vote. It was published in the state's official journal on 11 June, following Governor José Ignacio Peralta's signature, and came into effect the following day. Article 145 of the Civil Code was amended to read: Marriage is established by means of a civil contract entered into between two persons, with the purpose of forming a family and establishing a common household, with the intention of permanence, in order to support and assist one another in their married life. (Note: Spanish: El matrimonio se establece por medio de un contrato civil celebrado entre dos personas, con la finalidad de formar una familia, establecer un hogar común, con voluntad de permanencia, para procurarse y ayudarse mutuamente en su vida marital.)

25 May 2016 vote in the Congress
Party	Voted for	Voted against	Abstained	Absent (Did not vote)
National Action Party	13: Luis Ayala Campos; Francisco Ceballos Galindo; Nicolás Contreras Cortés; Miguel García Rivera; Crispín Guerra Cárdenas; Julia Jiménez Angulo; Luis Ladino Ochoa; Adriana Mesina Tena; Norma Padilla Velasco; Riult Rivera Gutiérrez; Gabriela Sevilla Blanco; Martha Sosa Govea; Mirna Velázquez Pineda	–	–	–
Institutional Revolutionary Party	7: Juana Andrés Rivera; José Benavides Florián; Santiago Chávez Chávez; Graciela Larios Rivas; Héctor Magaña Lara; Federico Rangel Lozano; Octavio Tintos Trujillo	–	–	1: Eusebio Mesina Reyes
Citizens' Movement	1: Leticia Zepeda Mesina	–	–	–
Ecologist Green Party of Mexico	1: Martha Meza Oregón	–	–	–
Labor Party	1: Joel Padilla Peña	–	–	–
New Alliance Party	1: José Orozco Neri	–	–	–
Total	24	0	0	1
Total	96.0%	0.0%	0.0%	4.0%

=== Statistics ===
The following table shows the number of same-sex marriages performed in Colima as reported by the National Institute of Statistics and Geography.

Number of marriages performed in Colima
Year	Same-sex			Opposite-sex	Total	% same-sex
Year	Female	Male	Total	Opposite-sex	Total	% same-sex
2016	35	36	71	3,325	3,396	2.09%
2017	45	23	68	3,078	3,146	2.16%
2018	34	6	40	3,050	3,090	1.29%
2019	44	24	68	3,273	3,341	2.04%
2020	26	14	40	2,468	2,508	1.59%
2021	28	17	45	3,216	3,261	1.38%
2022	30	16	46	3,165	3,211	1.43%
2023	53	15	68	3,094	3,162	2.15%
2024	40	11	51	3,038	3,089	1.65%

== Public opinion ==
A 2017 opinion poll conducted by the Strategic Communication Office (Gabinete de Comunicación Estratégica) found that 47% of Colima residents supported same-sex marriage, while another 47% were opposed. According to a 2018 survey by the National Institute of Statistics and Geography, 39% of the Colima public opposed same-sex marriage.

== See also ==
- Same-sex marriage in Mexico
- LGBT rights in Mexico
