= Arnoldo Vizcaíno =

Mexican politician

Arnoldo Vizcaíno Rodríguez is a Mexican politician, founder and former chairman of the Party of the Democratic Revolution chapter in the state of Colima. He served in the LII Legislature of the Congress of Colima, where he served a stint as President. He also ran for governor in the 1991 state elections.

== Personal life ==
His daughter, Indira Vizcaíno Silva, is a politician who has served as a federal deputy, municipal president of Cuauhtémoc, Colima, and is the current Governor of Colima.

In 2021, he published a book of short stories called Desde la Ventana de los Recuerdos.
