= 2009 Colima state election =

Local election in Mexico

A local election was scheduled to be held in the Mexican state of Colima on Sunday, July 5, 2009. Voters went to the polls to elect, on the local level:

- the Governor of Colima
- municipal presidents (mayors) to serve for a three-year term.
- Local deputies to serve for a three-year term in the Congress of Colima.

== Gubernatorial election ==
Four candidate contested the gubernatorial election.

Allience	Candidate	Votes	Percentage
PAN-ADC	Martha Sosa Govea	121,814	44.5%
PRI-PVEM-PANAL	Mario Anguiano Moreno	139,183	50.9%
PRD-PSD	Alberto Ochoa Manzur	5,651	2.1%
PT-Convergence	Gabriel Salgado Aguilar	1,515	0.6%

Mario Anguiano Moreno was elected Governor with 50.9% of the vote.
