= Battle of Llanos de Santa Juana =

Battle of the War of Mexican Independence

- Part of the Mexican War of Independence
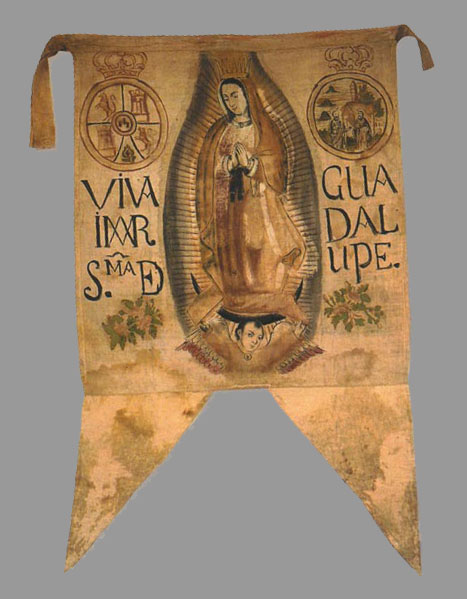
- The banner of Miguel Hidalgo, carried by the rebel forces even after his death by execution.
Date	12 July 1811
Location	Llanos de Santa Juana, Cuauhtémoc, Cuauhtémoc, Colima, Mexico
Result	Spanish Royalist victory

Belligerents
Mexican Rebels	Spanish Empire

Commanders and leaders
José Calixto Martínez y Moreno	Manuel del Río

Strength
~1,000 soldiers	Unknown

Casualties and losses
300 dead	Unknown

The Battle of Llanos de Santa Juana took place during the War of Mexican Independence on 12 July 1811 in the area around Cuauhtémoc, Colima known as Llanos de Santa Juana. The battle was fought between the royalist forces loyal to the Spanish crown and the Mexican rebels fighting for independence from the Spanish Empire. The Mexican insurgents were commanded by General José Calixto Martínez y Moreno and the Spanish by Colonel Manuel del Río. The battle resulted in a victory for the Spanish royalists.

== The battle ==
The insurgents, commanded by General José Calixto Martínez y Moreno (also known as Cadenas), were routed by the royalist forces of Manuel del Rio. The rebel forces suffered 300 soldiers killed out of 1,000, the majority of these being local villagers who were armed, but not generally trained to fight.

== Aftermath ==
Almost immediately following this defeat, however, on 16 July 1811, the rebel forces operating in Colima, under the command of Ignacio Sandoval and Miguel Gallaga, were able to seize the state for the rebel cause, making the loss at Llanos de Santa Juana of less tactical importance.

== See also ==
- Mexican War of Independence
