= Mely Romero Celis =

Mexican politician

- Born: 12 September 1977 (age 48); Cuauhtémoc, Colima, Mexico
- Education: University of Colima; Columbia University
- Occupation: Senator
- Political party: PRI

Mely Romero Celis (born 12 September 1977) is a Mexican politician affiliated with the PRI. She served as Senator during the 62nd session of Congress representing Colima, and previously served in the Congress of Colima.

Romero Celis won election as one of Colima's senators in the 2024 Senate election, occupying the first place on the Fuerza y Corazón por México coalition's two-name formula.
