= Carlos Flores Dueñas =

Mexican politician (born 1948)

Carlos Flores Dueñas (born 1948 in Colima) is a Mexican politician of the Institutional Revolutionary Party (PRI), who served as the acting governor of Colima in November and December 2003. Both before and since serving as governor, he has also served as the state's Secretary of Education. He is a former teacher.

== Teaching ==
Carlos Flores graduated from the Centro Regional de Educación Normal in Ciudad Guzmán, Jalisco and went on to earn a Master of Education degree from the University of Colima. He has worked as a teacher at primary, intermediate and high school level in Jalisco and Colima states. He specialized in teaching mathematics. He founded the Bachilleres Técnico número 17 de Comala and acted as its director.

He was secretary to the rector of the University of Colima (current Governor Fernando Moreno Peña) from 1988 to 1996.

== Politics ==
He has held a number of political posts, both in the state government and within the PRI, including acting as supervisor of secondary schools in Colima and his present position as Secretary of Education, which began during the governorship of Fernando Moreno Peña in 1997.

When Governor Moreno's term ended, the election results were annulled by the Federal Electoral Tribunal as a result of accusations that the governor had used his office to give excessive aid to the winner, PRI candidate Gustavo Vázquez Montes. Carlos Flores was then named interim governor by 15 votes to 10, and during his brief two-month tenure from 1 November 2003, new elections were held. Gustavo Vázquez prevailed a second time, and upon leaving the governorship on 31 December 2003, Carlos Flores returned to his old post as the state's Secretary of Education, which he continues to hold to this day.

== Personal life ==
He is married to Esperanza.

== See also ==
- List of Mexican state governors
- Governor of Colima
- 2003 Colima state election

Preceded by Fernando Moreno Peña	Governor of Colima; 2003	Succeeded by Gustavo Vázquez Montes
