= Muxe =

Zapotec gender identity

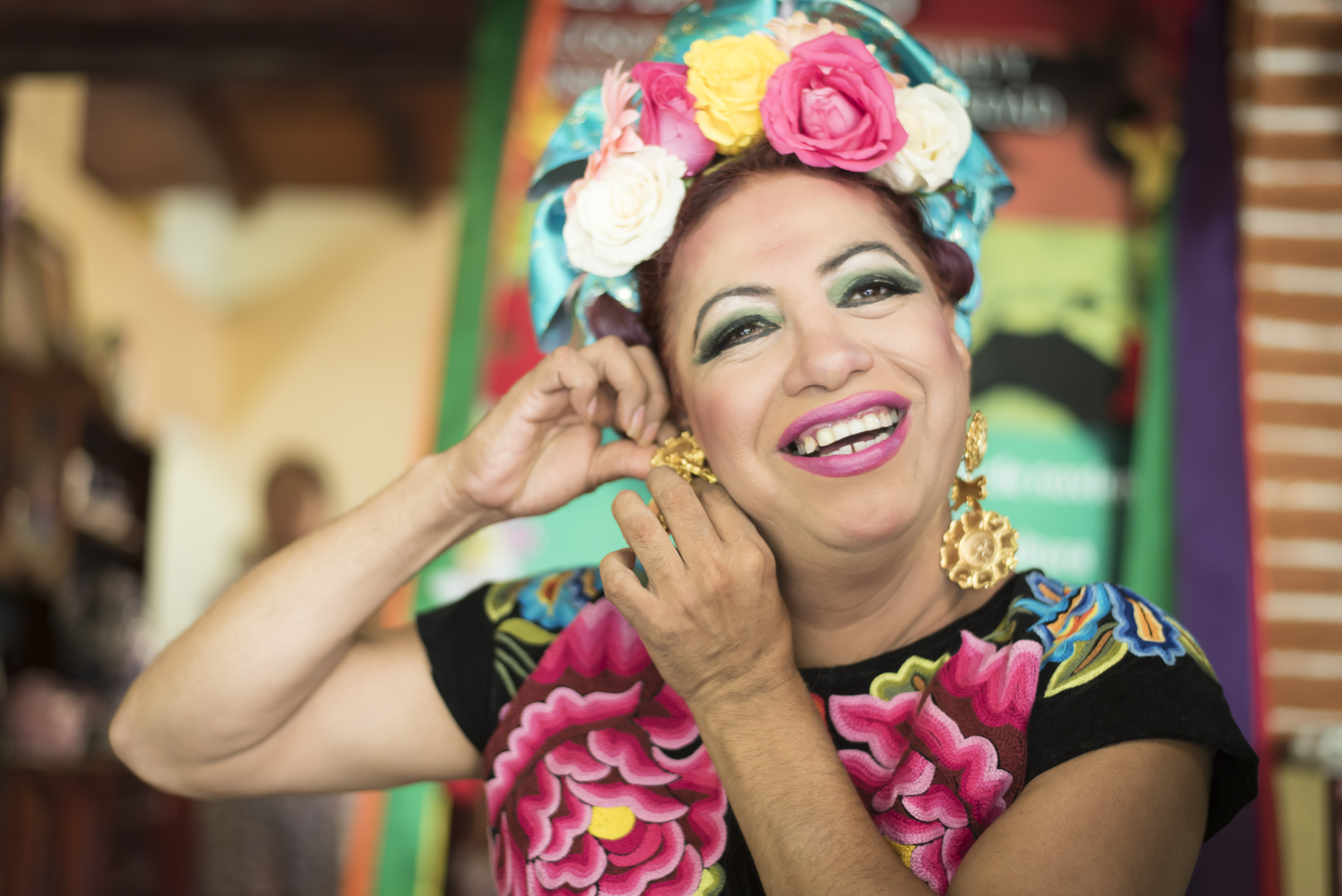
Felina Santiago, Muxe activist, President of the Muxe Group Las Auténticas Intrépidas Buscadoras del Peligro Photo: Miho Hagino

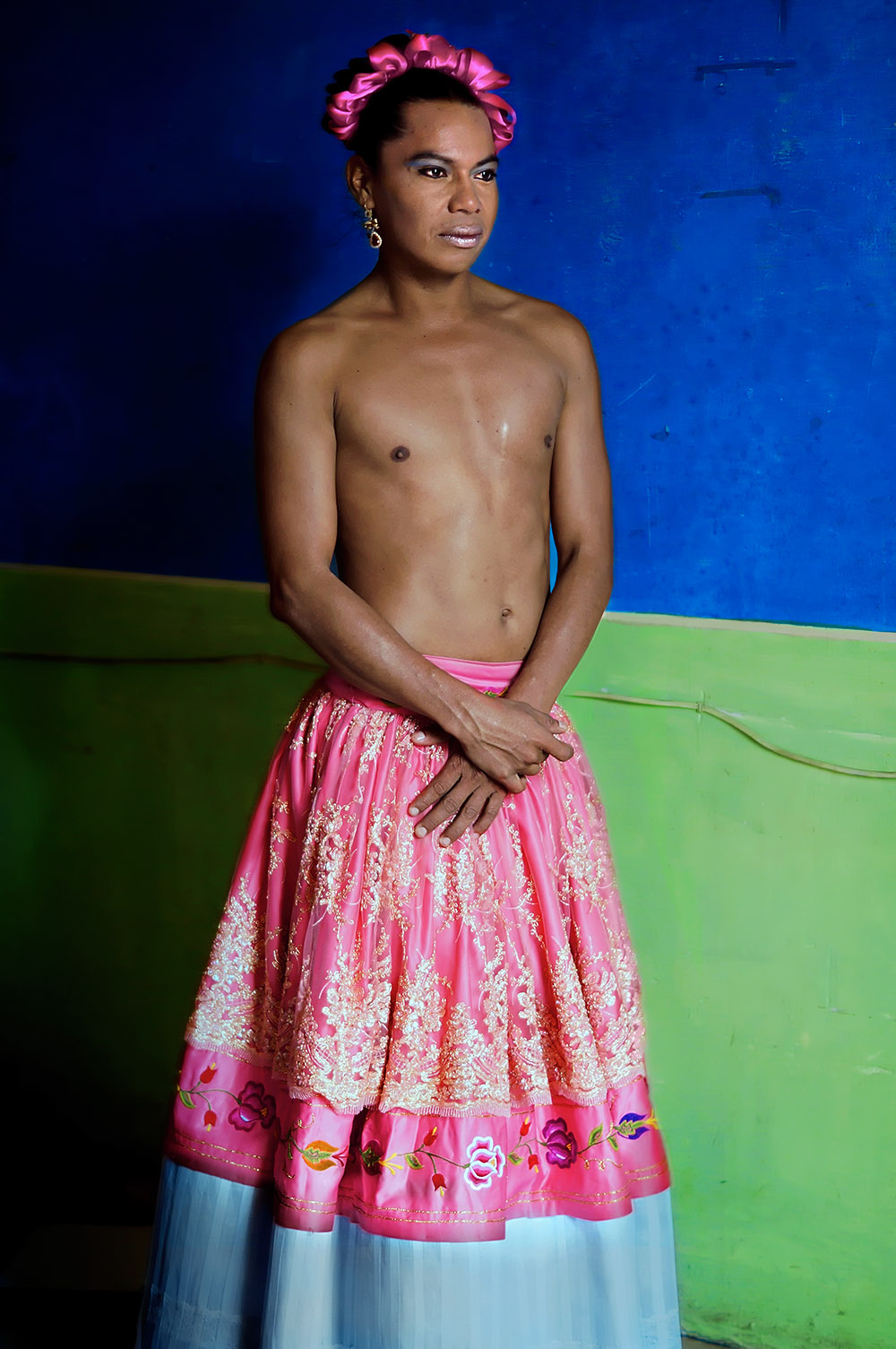
Lukas Avendaño, a Zapotec muxe performance artist.

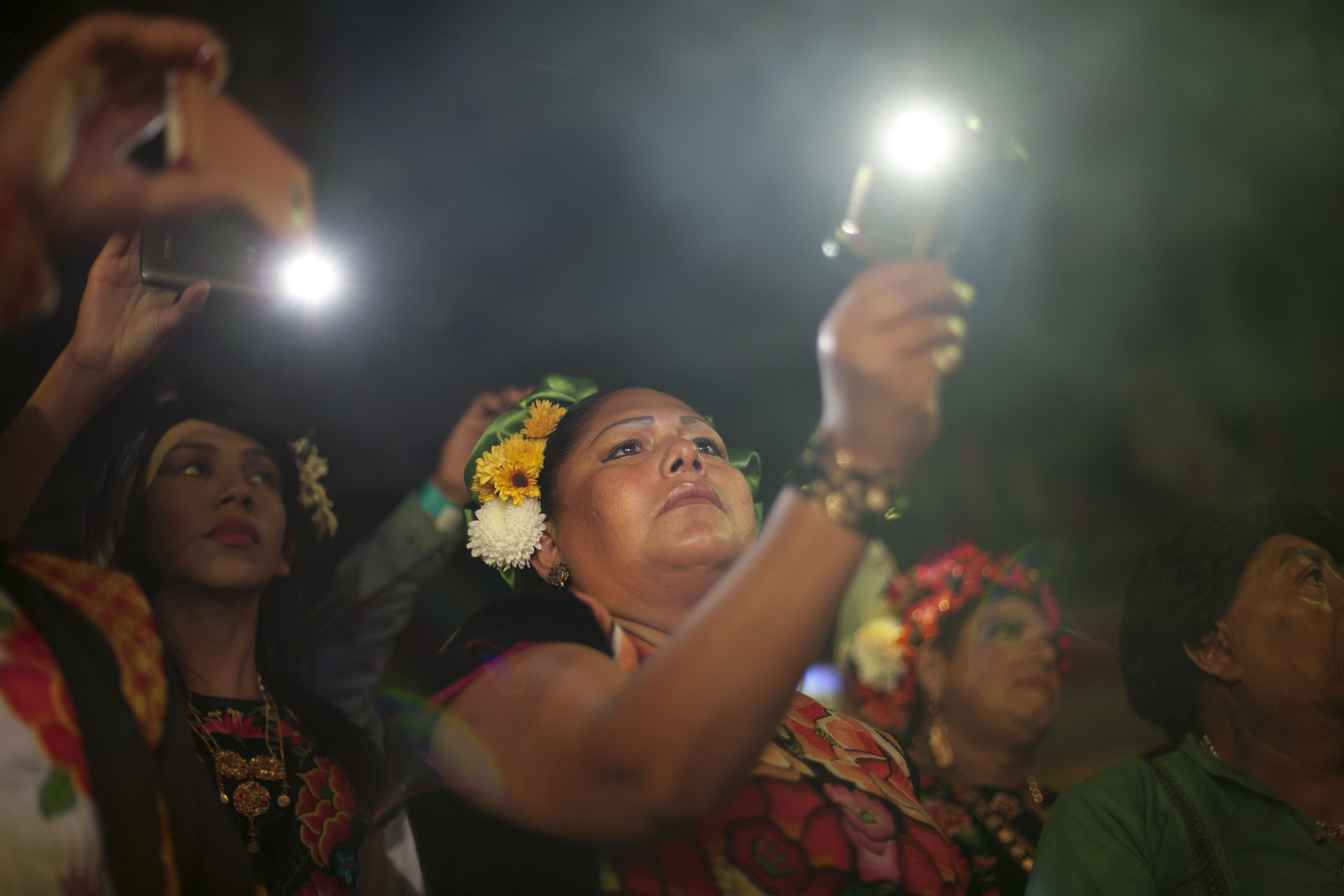
Muxes wave phones as flashlights in the dark at a muxe vela, a festival celebrates the sexual and gender diversity of Juchitán, Oaxaca, Mexico.

In Juchitán de Zaragoza, a Zapotec culture of Oaxaca (southeastern Mexico), a muxe (also spelled muxhe; [muʃeʔ]) is a person assigned male at birth who adopts aspects of feminine gender roles, including dress, behavior, and social standing. The extent to which muxes present with feminine or masculine gender identities depends on location, social reception, and individual preference, among other factors. They are commonly defined as a third gender which is neither male or female. Muxe identity not only involves gender identity and presentation, but also a preservation of Zapotec culture and customs.

== Etymology ==
Although the exact etymology of the Zapotec word muxe is unknown, it is thought to derive from the Spanish word for "woman", mujer. In the 16th-century, the letter x had a sound similar to "sh" (see History of the Spanish language § Modern development of the Old Spanish sibilants). The word muxe is a gender-neutral term, among many other Zapoteco words.

== Gender and identity in Zapotec culture ==
In contrast to Mexico's majority mestizo culture, the Isthmus of Tehuantepec has a predominantly Zapotec population, representing one of the country's indigenous peoples. Other Zapotec communities, outside the Isthmus, have similar third gender roles, such as the biza'ah of Teotitlán del Valle. One study estimates that 6 percent of males in an Isthmus Zapotec community in the early 1970s were muxes.

It is unknown if the Zapotec three-gender system predates Spanish colonization due to the lack of sources that survived the colonial period. Although there is evidence of homosexual activity in indigenous Mesoamerican societies and accounts of cross-dressing given spiritual or ritual significance, little historical evidence exists that sheds light on the origins of muxes.

=== Mythological origins ===
According to a popular myth in Juchitán, San Vicente, the patron saint of Juchitán, had three sacks, one with women, one with men, and another that contained a third gender. He accidentally ripped open the sack containing the mixed-gender individuals in Juchitán, giving the community more third-gender people than the rest of the world. Another variation states that the muxes were so boisterous that they ripped open the bag once San Vicente got to Oaxaca. The myth describes why more muxes are present in Juchitán than in other societies.

=== Identity ===
Identification as a muxe is partly societal and partly individual. The individual's family and neighbors observe sons for signs of feminine behavior in their childhood. Once identifying a muxe, mothers may encourage their muxe children to participate in work usually done by women and provide feminine clothing for them.

American anthropologist Beverly Chiñas explained in 1995 that in the Zapotec culture, gender and sexual identity is seen as an inherent attribute rather than something that can be chosen or changed. Most people view their gender as something God has given them and few muxes desire genital surgery.

Although there are individuals within Juchitán who identify as gay and transgender, these individuals do not usually overlap with those who identify as muxe. Gay men identify as men, dress like men, and do work associated with men, while muxes adopt feminine identities to some extent.

Muxes vary drastically in terms of gender presentation and expression. Many muxes have masculine and feminine personas, with both a masculine birth name and a feminine muxe name. Most literature uses feminine pronouns when muxes are in feminine clothing and masculine pronouns when muxes use a masculine presentation. Some may dress in traditional feminine clothing all the time, while some may only dress up on special occasions or in certain places. Likewise, some muxes prefer to identify solely with their feminine names, present as feminine, and take on feminine work.

However, to many muxes in Juchitán, gender presentation as "female or male" is less important than living as a Zapoteco individual. Whereas identifying as transgender solely involves a person's gender identity, being a muxe requires one preserve and respect traditional Zapotec culture, regardless of whether they present as masculine or feminine at any given time.

=== Societal role ===
Rather than a gender identity that defines itself in opposition to the gender binary, muxes occupy a defined gender category with a distinct role within Juchitán society. Juchitán society is matrifocal, and Juchitán women have important and valuable societal roles. For instance, women control Juchitán's economy, as many women are at once matriarchs, artisans, and merchants. Muxes participate in these feminine spheres of Juchitán society, such as artisan work, household maintenance, and merchantry. While men and women often leave the parent's household to get married, muxes are traditionally supposed to live in their parents' household in order to care for aging parents. The help that muxes provide with household/artisan/merchant work and their care for their parents in adulthood is posited as a reason for why some families view muxes as a blessing.

Some muxes marry women and have children while others choose men as sexual or romantic partners. Although it is looked down upon by wider society, muxes sometimes pay straight men for sexual relationships.

Muxes may be vestidas ("dressed", i.e. wearing traditional women's clothing) or pintadas ("painted", i.e. wearing make-up but not women's clothing). The phenomenon of muxes dressing in clothes typically worn by women is fairly recent, beginning in the 1950s and gaining popularity until nearly all of the younger generation of muxes today are vestidas. Muxes termed vestidas tradicionales dress with traditional Zapotec clothing all or most of the time, including huipiles, which are handmade dresses composed of colourful fabrics. In contrast, vestidas modernas dress in modern feminine clothing.

==== Velas ====
"Las Velas" are a general name for festivals celebrated in Zapotec cultures since pre-Columbian times. The four-day celebration consists of a mass; the regada de frutas (tossing of fruit); the vela, an all-night dance; and the lavada de ollas (washing the pots) held the afternoon after the vela. Muxes play important economic roles in the vela festivals, where they work as artisans to provide the traditional dress worn by many in attendance. Muxes were banned from wearing traditional clothing to the vela festivities for sixteen years, during which they fought for their right to participate in traditional clothing, until their return in 2019.

La Vela de las Intrépidas, a vela that takes place in early November, is the most prominent of the velas organized by Las Intrépidas (a prominent muxe organization) which celebrates muxe identity and Zapotec society. Since generosity and gift-giving is highly valued within indigenous Juchitán society, muxes compete to finance the vela. After the end of the celebration, one muxe is crowned as queen, named the "mayordomo."

=== Social acceptance ===
Although muxes in Juchitán are socially accepted and, in many cases, valued, outside of Juchitán, muxes face oppression and hostility. Some families see muxes as a blessing, while other muxes are forbidden by their families from deviating from a masculine gender role. Muxes from larger, more Westernized towns face ample discrimination, especially from cis men due to attitudes introduced by Catholicism. Gender variance and same-sex desire in wealthier communities of the region are more likely to follow a Western taxonomy of gay, bisexual and transgender. Such individuals are also more likely to remain "in the closet". Since muxes belong to indigenous communities, many of which are systematically disadvantaged, they generally belong to the lower classes of society.

== Muxe Representation in the Media ==
Representations of Muxes in Western media, have often been shaped by romanticization and cultural misunderstanding. Media portrayals frequently describe the Zapotec city of Juchitán, Oaxaca, as a “queer paradise,” emphasizing the visibility and apparent acceptance of Muxes while overlooking the discrimination, violence, and stigma many continue to face. Western and Mexican outlets commonly depict Muxes wearing traditional Tehuana attire, embroidered dresses associated with Zapotec femininity and Mexican national identity, contributing to the exoticization of Muxe culture and indigeneity. Scholars have also noted that Western frameworks tend to mislabel Muxes as “transgender,” “third gender,” or “gay,” imposing Western categories of gender and sexuality that do not align with Zapotec understandings. While such representations have increased global visibility for Muxes, they have also been criticized for reinforcing stereotypes and overshadowing the community’s cultural and political complexity. While such representations have increased global visibility, they have also been criticized for reinforcing stereotypes, and over generalizing the communities cultural and political complexity. Media often portrays muxes wearing traditional, colorful clothing, such as the embroidered huipil blouses, to emphasize their connection to their Zapotec heritage.

=== El Secreto del Río (2024) ===
The 2024 Netflix series El Secreto del Río directed by Alberto Barrera, marks a significant development in the representation of Muxes across Latin American mainstream media. The show was made up by a diverse team and set of cast members, including LGBTQ+, trans, Indigenous, and Zapotec actors. This inclusive approach serves as an effort to authentically represent the lives and traditions of Muxes. While El Secreto del Río has been praised for broadening visibility and providing opportunities for Indigenous and gender-diverse talent, some scholars and media commentators have cautioned against over-romanticizing their portrayal. They have argued that global streaming platforms can dilute the political and cultural specificity of muxe identities. Nonetheless, the show represents a meaningful step toward more nuanced and respectful depictions of muxes in contemporary media.

=== Photography ===
Nelson Morales, a Zapotec artist from Tehuantepec, has become a significant figure in visualizing Muxe identities through photography. Morales's work documents both community celebrations and intimate self-portraits, using the camera as a tool to understand his own Muxe identity and the diversity within muxe categories, including muxe gunaa' and muxe nguiiu. His photography challenges the narrow expectations often reproduced in media, such as the idea that muxes must conform to a single, traditionally feminine role, by presenting a wider spectrum of gender expression within Zapotec culture. Morales has stated that his projects function both as personal exploration and as a form of visibility for gender-diverse Indigenous communities, contributing to broader public understanding of Muxes beyond their frequent exoticization in Western and Mexican media.

=== Fashion and Global Media (Vogue Cover) ===
Muxes have increasingly gained visibility within global fashion media, most notably through Vogue's 2021 cover featuring Estrella Vazquez, a Zapotec muxe weaver and designer from Juchitan, Oaxaca. The cover, published in both the Mexican and British editions of Vouge, marked the first time in the magazines 120-year history that a muxe appeared on its front cover. Vazquez, photographed wearing a traditional embroidered huipil and holding a pink fan, described the moment as a significant step toward broader acceptance of muxes in Mexico, where long standing Roman catholic values have historically shaped anti-gay and anti-transgender attitudes.

=== Documentaries ===
Documentary film has played a crucial role in shaping media representations of muxes by providing community centered narratives that foreground lived experience, cultural specificity, and historical context. Unlike fictional portrayals or fashion oriented media, documentaries often emphasize the social roles of muxes within Zapotec communities, including their participation in family life, caregiving, labor, and cultural celebrations. These works have contributed to broader public understanding of muxes while also challenging romanticized depictions of Juchitån, Oaxaca as a site of universal gender acceptance.

At the same time, scholars and critics have noted that documentaries can reproduce certain visual tropes, such as an emphasis on traditional dress or festivals, while still fostering more nuanced perspectives than mainstream media. Overall, documentary film making has been central to making muxe identities visible internationally, while opening space for critical discussions about indigeneity, gender diversity and the limitations of Western gender frameworks.

==== Documentaries ====
Muxes: Auténticas, Intrépidas y Buscadoras de Peligro (2005), directed by Alejandra Isalas , Muxes (2016), directed by Ivan Olita, Muxes: Gender-Fluid Lives in a Small Mexican Town (2017)

== Prominent Muxes ==
=== Las Intrépidas ===
Las Auténticas Intrépidas Buscadoras del Peligro are a muxe organization founded in 1975 composed of and representative of muxes within Zapotec community. Las Intrépidas are well-integrated into Juchitán, particularly due to their ties to the Catholic Church and other political entities in the community, and are thus well-respected. Las Intrépidas members can come from various walks of life and may receive more employment than other muxes; for example, they are often hired around town at quinceañeras. Las Intrépidas also advocate for sex education, AIDS awareness, and domestic abuse support. Since they require an entrance fee, many of its members are from high social standing.

=== Individuals ===
Amaranta Gómez Regalado from Juchitán de Zaragoza is a prominent activist for LGBTQ+ rights, HIV prevention, disabled rights, gender equality, and the promotion of indigenous culture. In 2003, Regalado gained international prominence as a congressional candidate for the México Posible party in the Oaxaca state elections. She later earned a Bachelor’s degree in social anthropology at the University of Veracruz, the first muxe to have done so.

Lukas Avendaño is an emerging performance artist whose recent work constitutes a queer performatic intervention of Mexican nationalistic representations, particularly that of Zapotec Tehuana women. Avendaño, born on the Isthmus, embodies the complex identity of muxes. His cross-dressing performance interweaves ritual dances with autobiographical passages and actions that involve audience members, in order to challenge the widely-held view of a gay-friendly indigenous culture and point towards the existence of lives that negotiate pain and loneliness with self-affirming pride.

Alex Orozco is an actress, playwright and theater director that has won several regional awards with "Bala'na", a monologue about Muxe sex workers in the state of Oaxaca.

Marven is a food vendor often referred to by her business name Lady Tacos de Canasta. Her first notable appearance was a viral video taken while she was selling food at a 2016 Gay Pride march. Since then, she has grown in popularity and been featured on multiple media outlets. She was featured in Episode 3 of Taco Chronicles, the 2019 Netflix documentary series, in which she discusses both her business and gender. She was involved in multiple reported incidents with police in February and July 2019.

== See also ==
- Bakla, a similar group of people in the Philippines
- Blossoms of Fire (2000), a documentary film about the people of Juchitán, Oaxaca.
- Femminiello, a similar group of people in Naples, Italy
- Hijra, a group of people with similar traits in India
- Sexuality and gender in Zapotec Oaxaca
- Third gender
