= Silverio Cavazos =

Mexican politician (1968–2010)

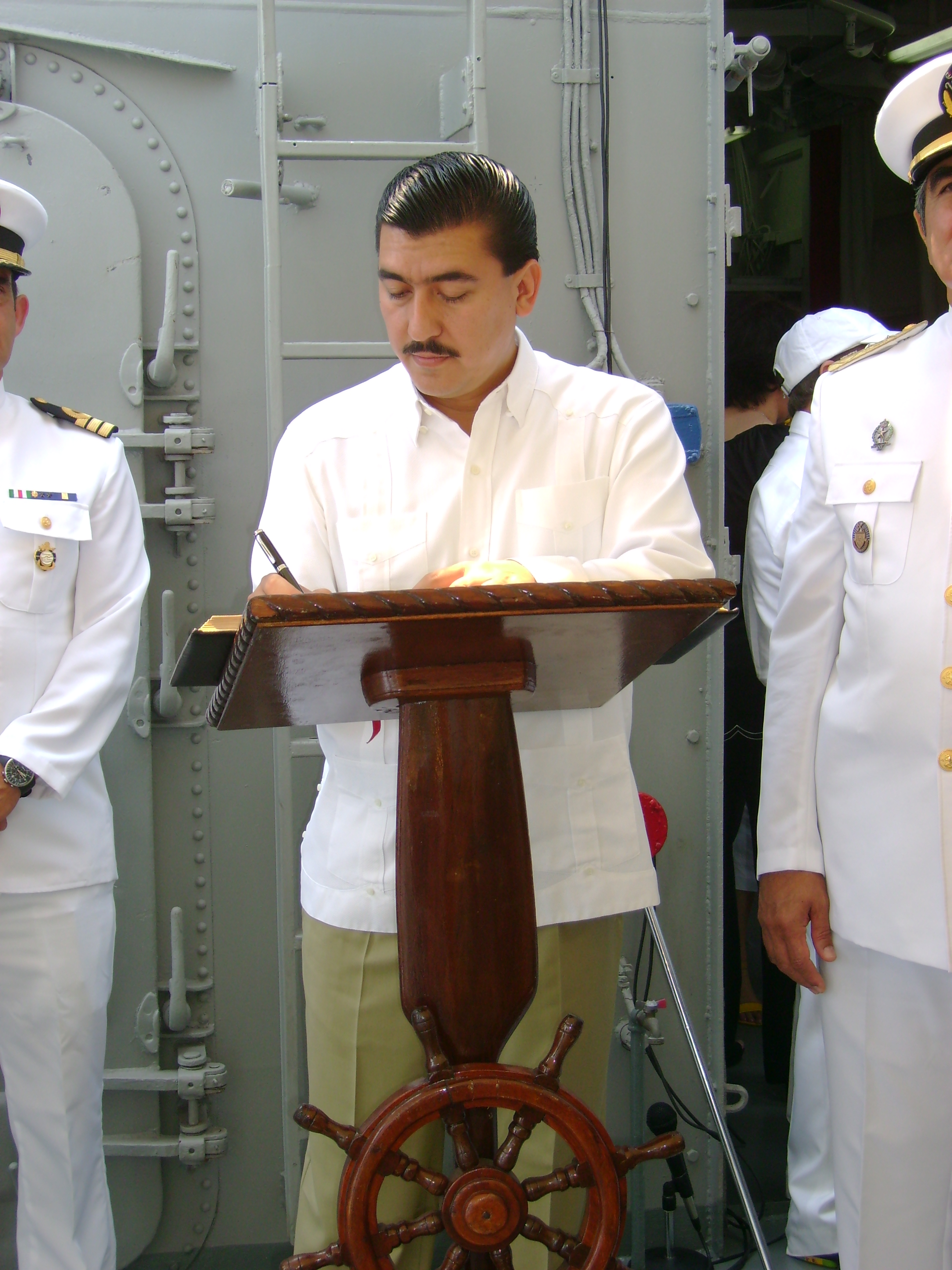
- Image of Silverio Cavazos, at a conference was a Mexican politician.

Governor of Colima
- In office 5 May 2005 – 2 November 2009
- Preceded by: Arnoldo Ochoa González
- Succeeded by: Mario Anguiano Moreno

Personal details
- Born: 15 December 1968 Tecomán, Colima, Mexico
- Died: 21 November 2010 (aged 41) Colima, Colima, Mexico
- Party: Institutional Revolutionary Party
- Education: University of Colima

Jesús Silverio Cavazos Ceballos (15 December 1968 – 21 November 2010) was a Mexican politician, the Governor of Colima from 2005 to 2009, elected after the death of Gustavo Vázquez Montes. He was a member of the Institutional Revolutionary Party (PRI).

Cavazos was elected to finish the 2003–2009 constitutional period of Gustavo Vázquez Montes, who won a special election after the ordinary elections were annulled. However, Vázquez Montes died in a plane crash in February 2005, for which it was necessary to call a third election, which was won by Cavazos.

He was killed outside his home by gunmen on 21 November 2010.

== See also ==
- List of politicians killed in the Mexican drug war

== See also ==
- List of Mexican state governors
- Governor of Colima
- 2003 Colima state election
- 2005 Colima gubernatorial election

Political offices
Preceded by Arnoldo Ochoa González	Governor of Colima; 2005–2009	Succeeded by Mario Anguiano Moreno
