= José Ignacio Peralta =

José Ignacio Peralta Sánchez
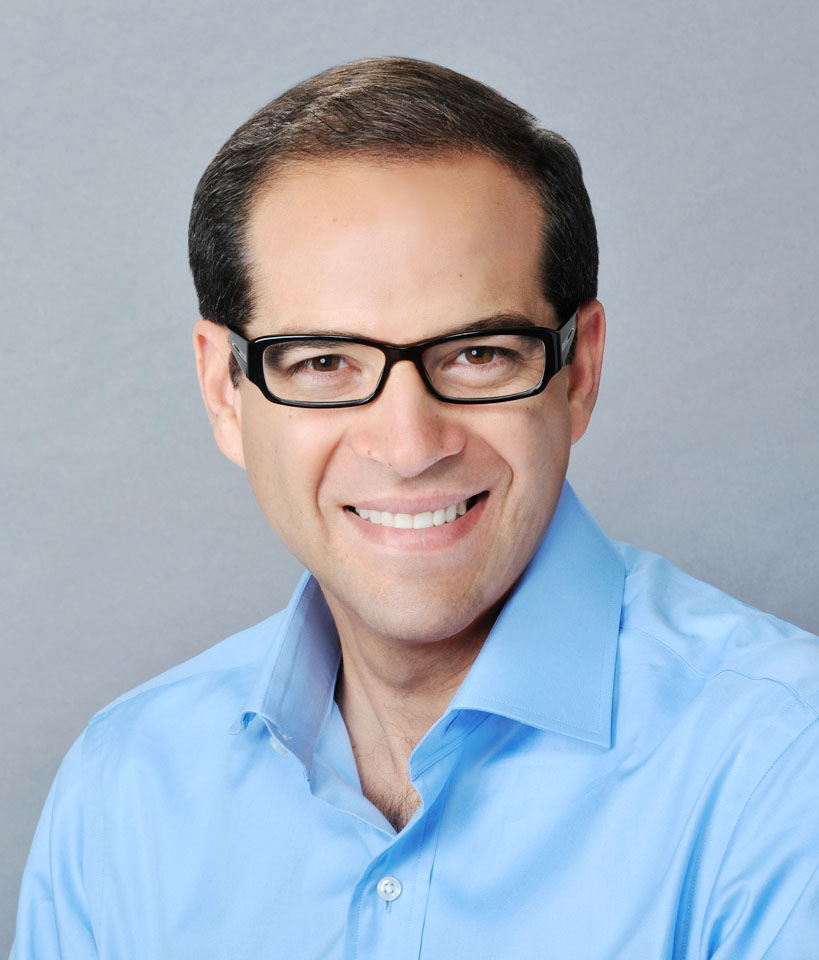
- Peralta in 2014

Governor of Colima
- In office February 11, 2016 – October 31, 2021
- Preceded by: Ramón Pérez Díaz (interim)
- Succeeded by: Indira Vizcaíno Silva

Personal details
- Born: October 1, 1970 (age 56) Colima, Mexico
- Party: Institutional Revolutionary Party
- Education: Instituto Tecnológico Autónomo de México (BS); University of Essex
- Profession: Economist

José Ignacio Peralta Sánchez (born October 1, 1970) is a Mexican politician from the Institutional Revolutionary Party who served as the Governor of Colima until 2021.

== Life ==
Peralta was born in the state capital of Colima City and earned his bachelor's degree in economics at the Instituto Tecnológico Autónomo de México (ITAM).

In 1993, he began working for the Banco de México, and three years later, he began pursuing a master's degree from the University of Essex; from 1998 to 2002, Peralta was a deputy manager in Banxico's department devoted to international exchange and metals and finished his career at the central bank in the national exchange division.

Peralta first joined the Colima state government in 2004 as the state Secretary of Economic Development. His five-year tenure in the post was marked by the completion of a natural gas refining and storage facility in Manzanillo. He left the post in 2009 in order to run for the municipal presidency of Colima City, which he won.

After initially being considered as a candidate for the Senate but passed over in favor of Mely Romero Celis, President-elect Enrique Peña Nieto named Peralta to his transition team in September 2012 as special projects coordinator, and once Peña Nieto was sworn in, he was named Subsecretary of Communications at the Secretariat of Communications and Transportation.

== Gubernatorial campaigns ==
In 2015, Peralta ran to become the next governor of Colima in a tight contest against Senator Jorge Luis Preciado, the candidate of the National Action Party. Peralta was supported by a coalition of the PRI, Green Party, Nueva Alianza and Labor Party. By a 503-vote margin, Peralta beat Preciado. However, the PAN presented a legal case before the TEPJF, Mexico's highest electoral court, claiming that officials from the state Secretariat of Social Development acted on orders of the outgoing governor, Mario Anguiano Moreno, to assist Peralta's campaign. The TEPJF annulled the election in late October, ordering new elections as soon as possible and prompting the installation of an interim governor, Ramón Pérez Díaz. In the special election that followed, Peralta won again with 43 percent of the vote., and after the TEPJF declared the election valid, Peralta was sworn in the next day.
