= 2005 Colima gubernatorial election =

Local election in Mexico

An extraordinary gubernatorial election was held in the Mexican state of Colima on 10 April 2005. The election was necessitated by the death of incumbent governor Gustavo Vázquez Montes of the Institutional Revolutionary Party (PRI) in a plane crash on 24 February 2005.

== Candidates ==
- Silverio Cavazos of the Alianza para que Vivan Mejor ("Alliance for Better Living") – PRI, PVEM and PT
- Leoncio "Loncho" Morán, of the Alianza Loncho me da Confianza, ("I Trust Loncho Alliance") – PAN and the Colima Democratic Association). Morán was the serving mayor of Colima, Colima, who took temporary leave from that position to fight the election.

== Results ==
- Silverio Cavazos – 109,358 votes (51.40%)
- Leoncio Morán – 101,180 votes (47.63%)

Cavazos was in as governor on 5 May.

Turnout was around 55% of the registered electorate, which both candidates described as disappointingly low.

== See also ==
- 2003 Colima state election
