= Antonio Barbosa =

Antonio Barbosa may refer to:

- António Barbosa (footballer) (born 1931), Portuguese footballer
- António Barbosa (football manager) (born 1982), Portuguese football manager
- António Barbosa de Melo (1932–2016), Portuguese politician
- Antonio Barbosa Heldt (died 1973), Mexican politician
- Alves Barbosa (1931–2018, Portuguese cyclist, full name António da Silva Alves Barbosa
- Antônio Lemos Barbosa (1910–1970), Brazilian priest and academic
