= Pedro Galván =

Pedro Galván may refer to:

- Pedro Galván (politician) (1833-1892), Mexican general and governor
- Pedro Galván (footballer) (born 1985), Argentine footballer
