= Mario Anguiano Moreno =

Mexican politician (born 1962)

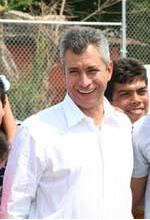
- Moreno in 2009

Governor of Colima
- In office November 1, 2009 – October 31, 2015
- Preceded by: Silverio Cavazos
- Succeeded by: Ramón Pérez Díaz

Personal details
- Born: August 15, 1962 (age 64) Tinajas, Colima
- Party: PRI
- Spouse: Alma Delia Arreola Cruz
- Education: University of Colima
- Profession: BA Economics

Mario Anguiano Moreno (born August 15, 1962, in Tinajas, Colima) is a Mexican politician and member of the PRI who served as the Governor of Colima from 2009 to 2015. He also previously served as the municipal president of the state capital of Colima City and represented it in the state legislature.

== Biography ==
Moreno was born on August 15, 1962, in Tinajas. He earned a bachelor's degree in economics from the University of Colima. For his dedication and commitment, Anguiano was awarded the "Peña Colorada" award, given to the student with the highest average grades, for the Class of 1986.

Anguiano was invited by the Friedrich Nauman Foundation (Fundación Friedrich Nauman) to represent Mexico in courses in Government and Fiscal Decentralization, held in Germany in 1997 and 2001, respectively.

In 1990, Anguiano joined the Institutional Revolutionary Party, and in 1992, he entered public service as the municipal treasurer of Colima City, serving a two-year term. He was then the chief accountant for the Congress of the State of Colima during its LI and LII Legislatures, from 1995 to 1999; he left to serve as the CEO of Agrotecnología de Colima, S.A. de C.V., an agrotechnology business. In 2000, he began a two-year stint as the municipal treasurer of Manzanillo.

Voters elected Anguiano from the third district of Colima, covering the southern portion of the city of Colima, to the LIV Legislature of the State Congress of Colima, which met between 2003 and 2006. Anguiano chaired the Finance and Budget Commission and sat on those for Rural Development and Fisheries; Planning, Tourism and Economic Development; and Human Rights.

In 2006, the capital city elected Anguiano again, this time as its municipal president for a three-year term. Colima City thus returned to PRI rule after three years of a PAN mayorship under Leoncio Morán Sánchez.

== Governor of Colima ==
During the 2009 Colima state election, Anguiano won 50.9 percent of the vote for governor, beating Sen. Martha Sosa Govea of the National Action Party (PAN). He served a six-year term and was replaced by Interim Governor Ramón Pérez Díaz, as the 2015 elections were annulled and a new governor was not installed until February 2016.

Political offices
Preceded by Silverio Cavazos	Governor of Colima; 2009-2015	Succeeded by Ramón Pérez Díaz (interim)
