= Francisco Zepeda González =

Mexican politician

- Born: 4 October 1969 (age 56); Manzanillo, Colima, Mexico
- Occupation: Deputy
- Political party: PRI

Francisco Alberto Zepeda González (born 4 October 1969) is a Mexican politician affiliated with the PRI. He served as Deputy of the LXII Legislature of the Mexican Congress representing Colima, and previously served in the Congress of Colima.
