= Tacos de canasta =

Mexican food

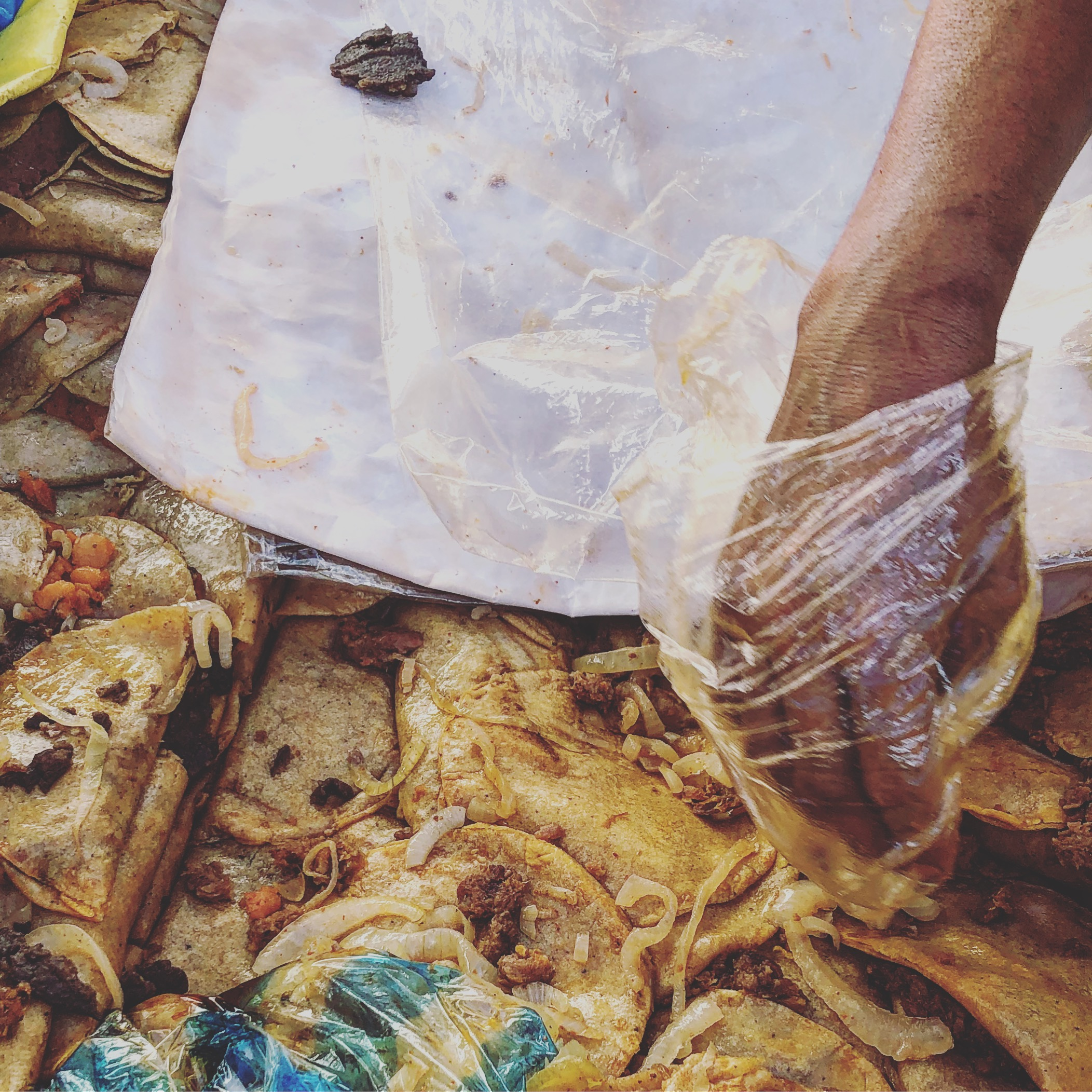
- Tacos de canasta in Coyoacán
- Alternative names: tacos sudados paquitos sudados (in Chiapas) tacos al vapor (Northern Mexico)
- Type: taco; Mexican antojito
- Place of origin: Tlaxcala, Mexico
- Associated cuisine: Mexican cuisine

Tacos de canasta ('basket tacos') are a popular Mexican food preparation consisting of tortilla filled with various stews. Typical fillings are papa ('potato'), chicharrón ('pork rinds'), frijoles ('beans') or adobo ('marinade'). In all cases, the tacos are bathed in oil or melted butter. They are originally from San Vicente Xiloxochitla, Tlaxcala, although they are consumed throughout central Mexico, especially in the large cities of the country. They are usually sold on bicycles that circulate on the streets or also in street stalls. The name comes from the basket in which they are placed to keep them warm.

They are considered a simple, very inexpensive snack (they do not exceed $10 MXN each) and are well known to all Mexicans, in addition to being highly caloric and satiating. Traditionally, they are served with spicy (green or red) sauce, pickled chilies or guacamole.

== Origin ==
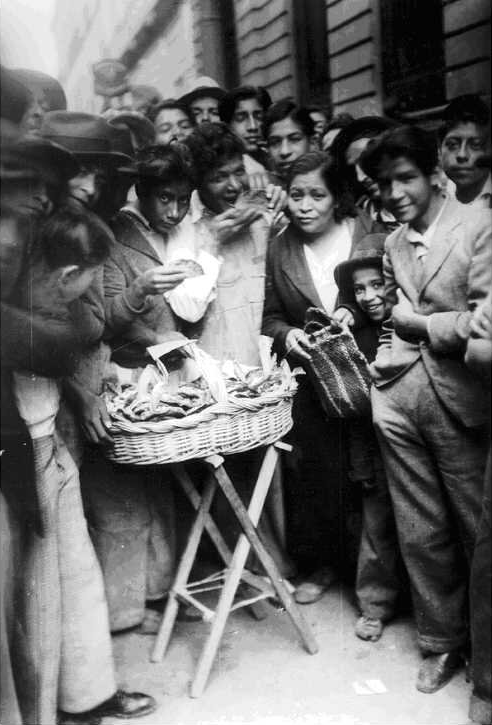
Saleswoman with her tacos in a basket (Mexico City, 1920)

The sale of tacos in baskets through the streets of Mexico City dates back to the time of the Porfiriato or earlier. However, the basket tacos as they are known today have their origin in the 1950s in the town of San Vicente Xiloxochitla, 10 km southwest of Tlaxcala de Xicohténcatl, known as la cuna (the cradle) or la capital (the capital) del taco de canasta. Originally, tacos sudados were a dish that was consumed after a day's work in the fields. However, the low profitability of working the land forced local residents to find a new livelihood.

Today, between 50% and 80% of Xiloxochitla families are engaged in the production of tacos de canasta, and many of them travel every day to Mexico City to sell their tacos de canasta.

== Preparation ==
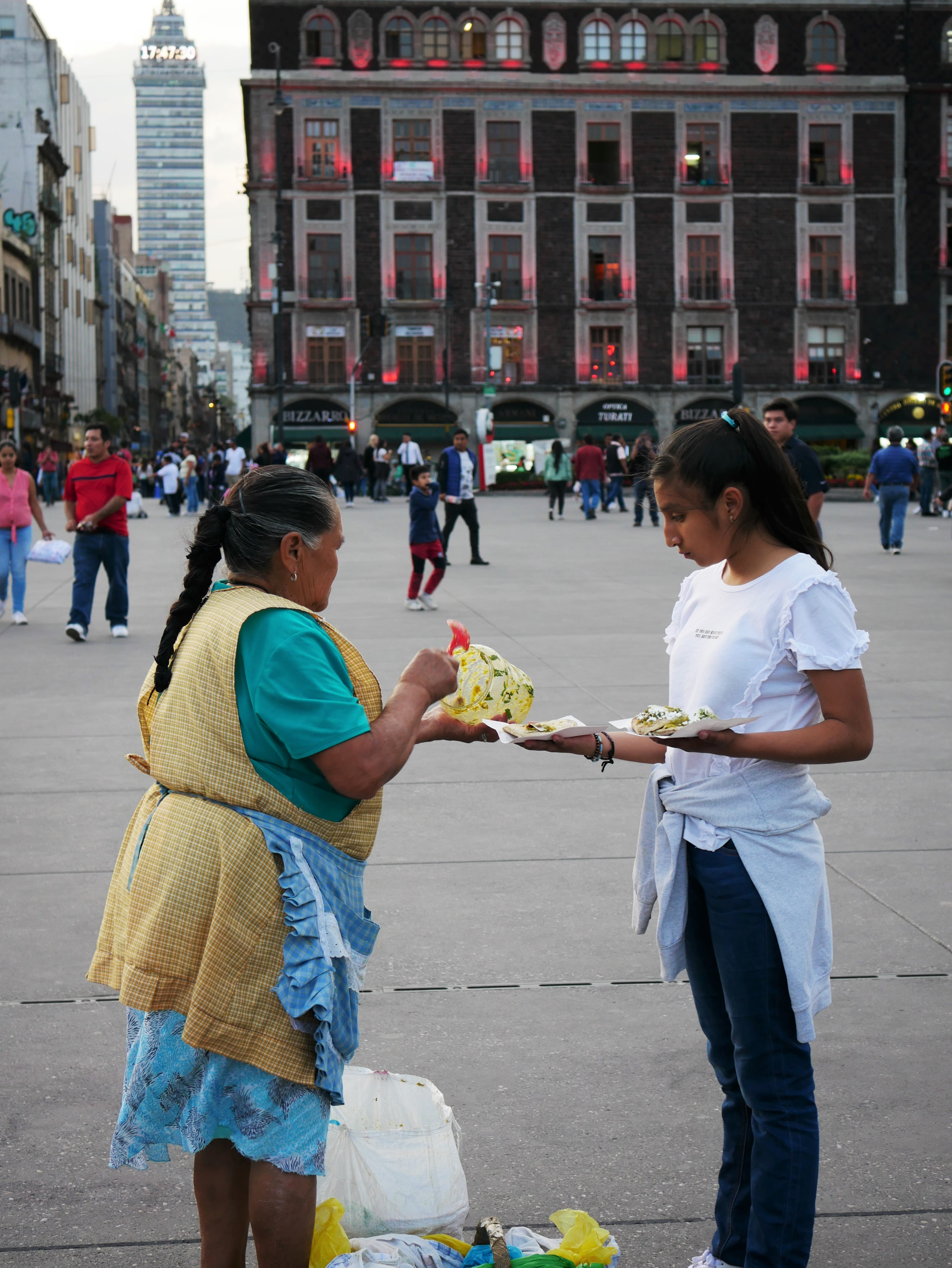
Tacos de canasta in Zocalo Square, Mexico City

The most common guisos ('fillings' for the taco) are 4: beans, potato, adobo and pork rinds. Although the variety of stews has diversified in recent decades, those mentioned are "classical" fillings. The preparation of these stews begins the night before, cooking the potato and the beans.

=== Classic stews ===
- Adobo stew: it is cooked and shredded beef brisket (falda de res), which is mixed with salt, onion and guajillo chili adobo; then, with the broth from the falda, all the ingredients are cooked in the pan until the ingredients are integrated and thickened.
- Chicharrón stew: the onion is seasoned and pressed pork rinds are added; then it is mixed with guajillo chili adobo and heated in the pan until it thickens.
- Frijoles stew: bayos beans are cooked and mixed with salt and onion, then crushed until they form a puree and cooked in a pan until they lose liquid.
- Potatoes stew: they are cooked and mashed, mixed with salt, and then with the seasoned onion and the serrano pepper; then with milk they are heated in the pan until the ingredients are integrated and thickened.

=== Basket ===
The basket is lined with kraft paper, aluminum foil and a plastic or rubber bag, typically blue. To fill it, first a layer of tacos is placed, then a layer of onion (sometimes also dried chili peppers) and a bath of lard or hot adobo; so on until the basket is completed. A medium basket allows a capacity for 100-150 tacos, while the largest ones contain 200-500 tacos.

They are covered with cloth blankets to preserve temperature and humidity. The basket allows them to stay warm for up to 4–6 hours.

== Traditions ==
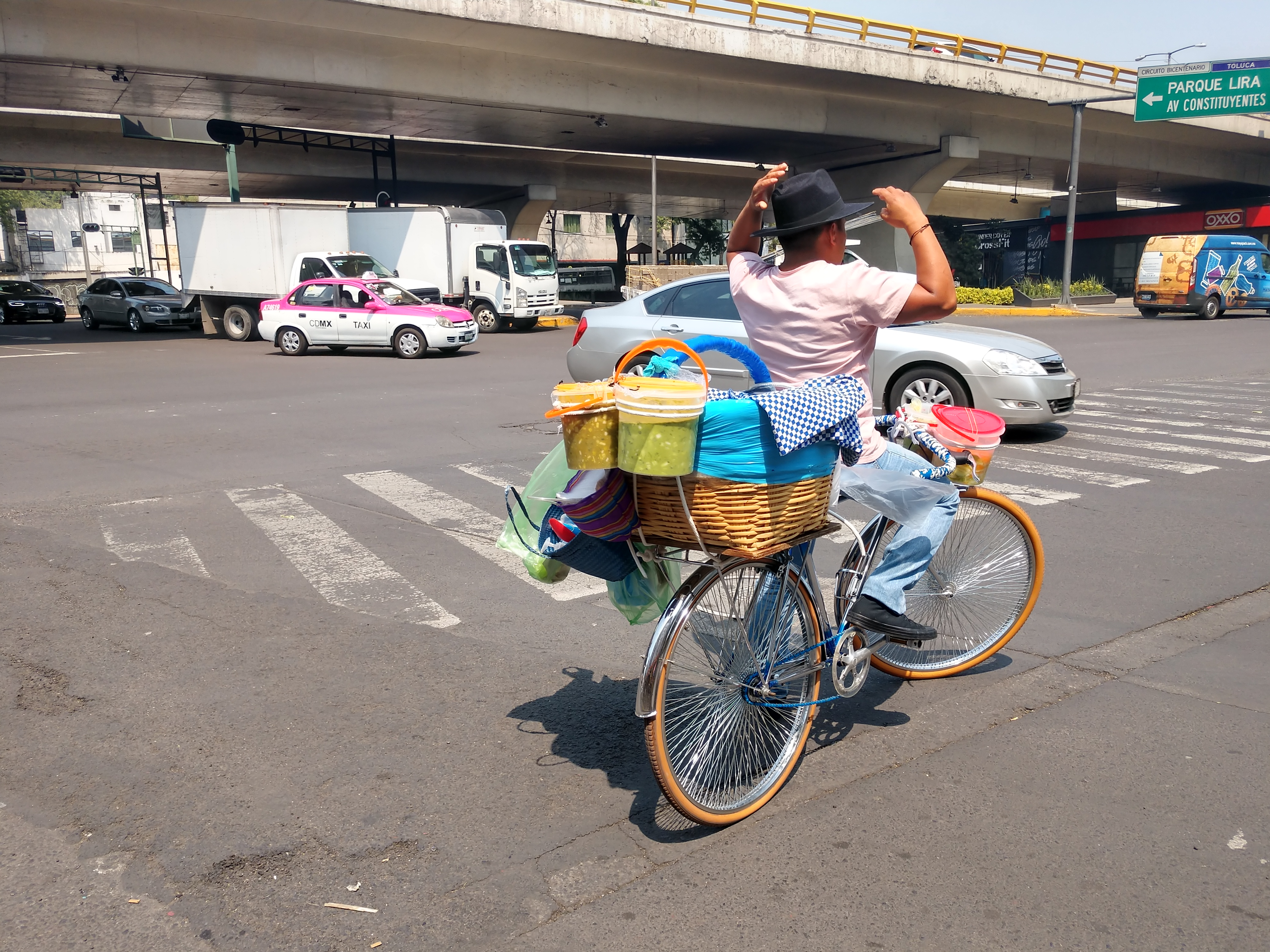
Basket taco vendor on a bicycle, Mexico City.

Tacos de canasta are named for the basket that is used for storage and sale. Between 7:00 and 8:00, the taqueros leave Xiloxochitla, by bicycle if it is to the nearby municipalities, or in trucks if it is to the large cities such as Mexico City or Puebla; some of whom reside in the city during the week, and return to Xiloxochitla on the weekend. Basket tacos are on the streets from mid-morning (10:00 - 11:00) until late afternoon (16:00 - 17:00).

Typically, customers gather around the stall and consume their tacos standing on the spot. Regulars include blue-collar workers, college students, and office workers who have little time for breakfast. This custom has spread throughout Mexico City.

In 2016, a basket taco vendor from Mexico City named Marven, although better known as Lady Tacos de Canasta, rose to fame for appearing in the Pride parade with her particular way of advertising: “Tacos! Tacos de canasta! Tacos!”. Later, Marven would participate in the Netflix micro-documentary Taco Chronicles (2019), for which she would be awarded the James Beard Foundation Award.

=== Taco de Canasta Fair ===
Since 2007, the Taco Fair has been held annually in San Vicente Xiloxochitla on the first Sunday in December. In each edition a commission is instituted to produce more than three thousand basket tacos that are delivered in the town square to the visitors of the event.

== Variants ==
=== Paques sudados ===
In Comitán, Chiapas, a version of tacos de canasta are sudados paquitos. The name is probably a deformation of taquitos sudados. On August 8, the day of Santo Domingo de Guzmán, patron of the town, the vendors go out with the baskets to sell paquitos through the streets of the town. Comitan-style paquitos consist of chorizo, egg, potato, rajas, and refried beans.

=== Tacos al vapor ===
The term tacos al vapor ('steamed tacos') is mostly used in Northern Mexico; they are different from tacos de canasta in that they are cooked in a steamer—hence the name—instead of a basket.

Los Mochis-style tacos al vapor are traditionally filled with a mixture of pulled meat and puréed potatoes, and, unlike tacos de canasta, are not bathed in oil, instead, the tortillas are dipped in oil without browning them, which are then layered in the steamer and steamed for around 20 minutes; when served, they are bathed in runny refried beans and salsa is added to taste. Tacos al vapor are traditionally eaten with horchata.

=== Tacos Tuxpeños ===
Tacos Tuxpeños ('Tuxpan-style tacos') are tacos that originated in Tuxpan, Jalisco and are eaten around Tuxpan and in the neighbouring state of Colima. The traditional fillings are potatoes, pulled pork, chicharrón, and refried beans, although others may be used. They are cooked on a basket, a cooler, or a steamer, and, like tacos al vapor, are dipped in oil without browning them, but what sets them apart is the traditional guajillo sauce they are dipped in before being layered in the container. They are usually eaten with shredded cabbage, pickled carrots, and salsa, and some people squeeze some lime juice on them.

== See also ==
- Cuisine of Mexico City
- Cuisine of Tlaxcala
- Tacos al pastor
- Tacos dorados
