= Arnoldo Ochoa González =

Mexican politician

Arnoldo Ochoa González (born January 27, 1951) is a Mexican politician, federal deputy and vice president of the Chamber of Deputies of Mexico.

He was an interim Governor of Colima after the death in an accident of Gustavo Vázquez. Before being interim governor, he was the Secretary of Interior under Vázquez.

Later, Silverio Cavazos was elected as the Governor of Colima. He would be again Secretary of Interior with Cavazos, and later he would renounce for a candidacy for Senate but he would renounce her by being in the second formula and he would opt for taking the charge of federal deputy.

A native of Colima City, Ochoa graduated from the National Autonomous University of Mexico with a law degree in 1979 and later taught at the University of Colima. He served as a federal deputy in the LI Legislature before serving in the XLIX Legislature of the Congress of Colima.

Preceded by Gustavo Vázquez	Governor of Colima; 2005	Succeeded by Silverio Cavazos
