= Heldt =

Heldt is a German surname, an alternative spelling of Held, meaning 'hero'. Notable people with the surname include :

- Barbara Heldt (born 1940), American writer
- Dora Heldt (born 1961), German writer
- Horst Heldt (born 1969), German footballer
- John C. Heldt (1900–1985), American football player and coach
- Margaret Vinci Heldt (1918–2016), American hairstylist
- Max Heldt (1872–1933), German politician
- Werner Heldt (1904–1954), German painter
- Will Heldt (born 2005), American football player

== See also ==
- Antonio Barbosa Heldt (died 1973), Mexican teacher and politician
- Eugénia da Conceição-Heldt (born 1970), Portuguese-German political scientist
- Heldt Prize, a literary award
