= Lady Tacos de Canasta =

Mexican muxe street taco vendor

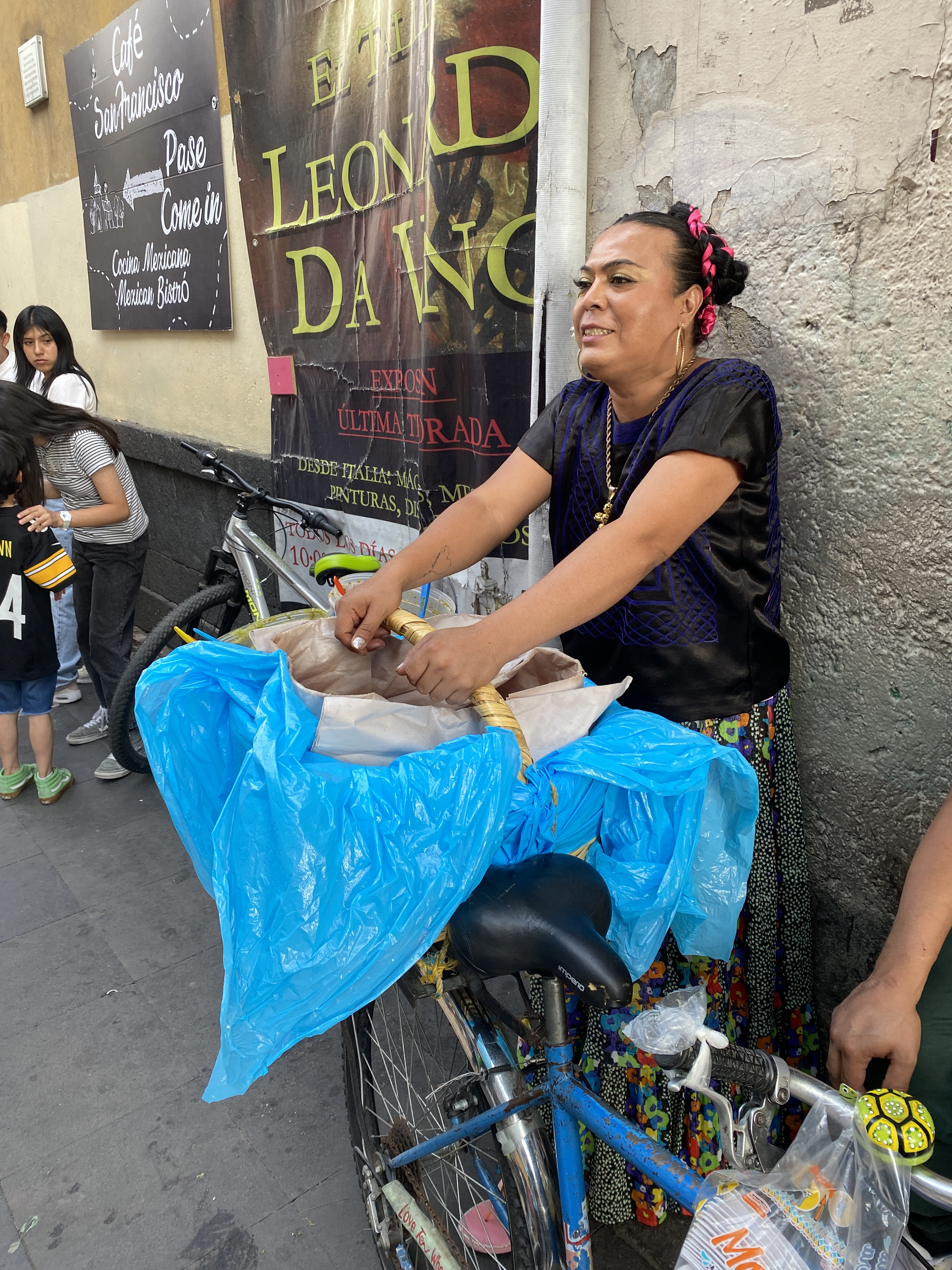
- Born: 1984 (age 41–42); Villa de Etla, Oaxaca, Mexico

Marven, also known as Lady Tacos de Canasta (English: Lady Basket Tacos) (born 1984) is a Mexican muxe street taco vendor. She gained popularity on social media for selling tacos at Mexico City Pride in 2016.

== Biography ==
Marven was born and raised in Villa de Etla, in the state of Oaxaca in Mexico. Her family sold tacos de canasta, a variety of taco prepared and sold by vendors on the street, typically while on a bicycle. From an early age, she helped her family with their business.

In 2016, a video of her selling tacos at Mexico City Pride was uploaded to Twitter, where it went viral. Users of the platform gave Marven the nickname "Lady Tacos de Canasta". Following this appearance, she has been a guest at subsequent Mexico City Prides. In 2019, she appeared on the Netflix series Taco Chronicles, in the episode "Canasta".

Since 2017, Marven has sold her tacos in Mexico City. She had previously sold her tacos along Madero Street, but stopped after an attack by the city's police force.

In 2021, Marven ran for a position in the Congress of Mexico City, under the banner of the Equality, Freedom, and Gender Party. She described the most recent altercation she had with police as fueling her desire to run for office.

In 2020, Marven co-opened a restaurant in Colonia Narvarte, Usharu. She left the project due to differences with the other parties. The next year, she established a new restaurant in the historic center of Mexico City. She closed the latter in early 2026 due to extortion.
