= 2003 Mexican elections =

The following is a list of elections, both federal and local, took place in Mexico during 2003.

== 6 July 2003 ==
=== Federal Congress ===
  - Chamber of Deputies – 500 federal deputies

=== Colima ===
  - Governor, state congress, and mayors
  - See: 2003 Colima state election

=== Nuevo León ===
  - Governor, state congress, and mayors
  - See: 2003 Nuevo León state election

=== Sonora ===
  - Governor, state congress, and mayors
  - See: 2003 Sonora state election

== 7 December 2003 ==
=== Colima ===
  - Re-run of annulled gubernatorial race
  - See: 2003 Colima state election

== See also ==
- Politics of Mexico
- List of political parties in Mexico
