= Indira Vizcaíno =

Mexican politician (born 1987)

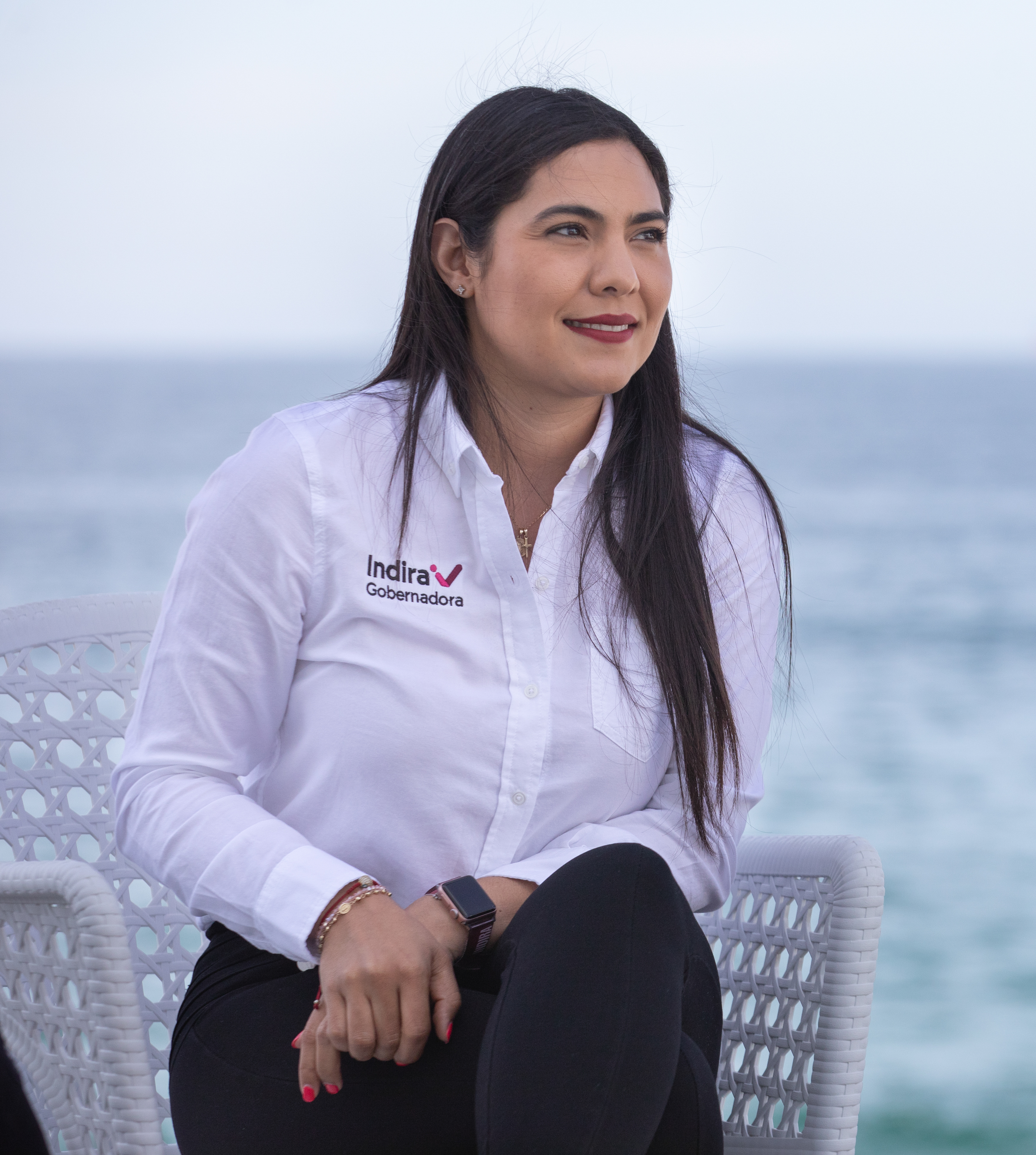

Governor of Colima
- Incumbent
- Assumed office 1 November 2021
- Preceded by: José Ignacio Peralta Sánchez

Municipal president of Cuauhtémoc, Colima
- In office 15 October 2012 – 14 October 2015
- Preceded by: José de Jesús Plascencia Herrera
- Succeeded by: Rafael Mendoza Godínez

Federal deputy at the Congress of the Union
- In office 1 September 2009 – 31 August 2012

Personal details
- Born: Indira Vizcaíno Silva; 14 January 1987 (age 39) Tijuana, Mexico
- Party: MORENA (since 2014); PRD (2002-2012)
- Education: University of Colima
- Occupation: Politician

Indira Vizcaíno Silva (born 14 January 1987) is a Mexican politician from the Morena party. From 2009 to 2012 she served as Deputy of the LXI Legislature of the Mexican Congress representing Colima. In 2021, she became the second female Governor of Colima after Griselda Álvarez, as well as the first non-PRI governor of the state in over 90 years.

The daughter of former politician Arnoldo Vizcaíno, she was born in Tijuana while her father worked in the city but grew up in Colima.
