= Sexuality and gender in Zapotec Oaxaca =

Oaxaca, Mexico, has a high volume of indigenous Zapotec peoples.

== Zapotec presence ==
The country of Mexico has a high population of indigenous communities that can be found throughout the entire country. Michelle Muñoz Cisneros recognizes the various indigenous groups that span throughout the entire county, citing the Comisión Nacional para El Desarrollo de los Pueblos Indigenas which confirmed 68 communities indigenous to Mexico. A heavy indigenous presence is located in more southern regions of Mexico, specifically the state of Oaxaca. Within Oaxaca, 65.7% of the population are indigenous to the 16 groups identified. While 57% of Oaxaca's population specifically identifies with the indigenous groups of Zapotec and Mixtec.

The presence of the Zapotec group has been traced back to around 10,000 years ago along with similar groups such as Mixtec. The native language family of Oto-manguean is used by the Zapotec community and has been prevalent throughout the years. In a study from 2005 by the National Institute of Statistics and Geography, they gathered data of 410,901 individuals throughout Mexico who stated that they were fluent in indigenous Zapotec languages. Of this pool, 87% of individuals who claimed to speak Zapotec languages resided in Oaxaca. Each of these statistics demonstrate the prominent presence of the Zapotec individuals in Oaxaca, which is further elaborated in mentioned academic articles.

== Academic research ==
Academic research such as Lynn Stephens article Sexualities and Gender in Zapotec Oaxaca explore how gender and sexuality are understood within this region based on her archival research of the impacts of colonialism and through her observations during her stay in the small cities of Juchitán de Zaragoza and Teotitlán del Valle both cities found in the state of Oaxaca. Stephens describes a common understanding in the state of Oaxaca, that there is a strong sense of regional pride, established gender roles, and indigenous roots that are present. Further analyzing how many individuals actively participate in keeping these traditions and culture alive. Specifically, her research focuses on the high population of Zapotec individuals found in the regions such as Juchitán de Zaragoza or Teotitlán de Valle, Oaxaca. In these communities she describes a normalization and consistent use of Zapotec languages, the inclusion of the third gender Muxe, and the continuation of culturally significant formal events known as velas. Stephen examines how the understanding of gender and sexuality in Zapotec culture has been influenced by migration, colonialism, and class division. Ultimately, the impacts of each of these outside forces create an understanding of designated roles for each gender, the relationship between gender and normalized sexuality, and representation of these gender identities and sexuality in different contemporary settings.

== Indigenous gender identity ==
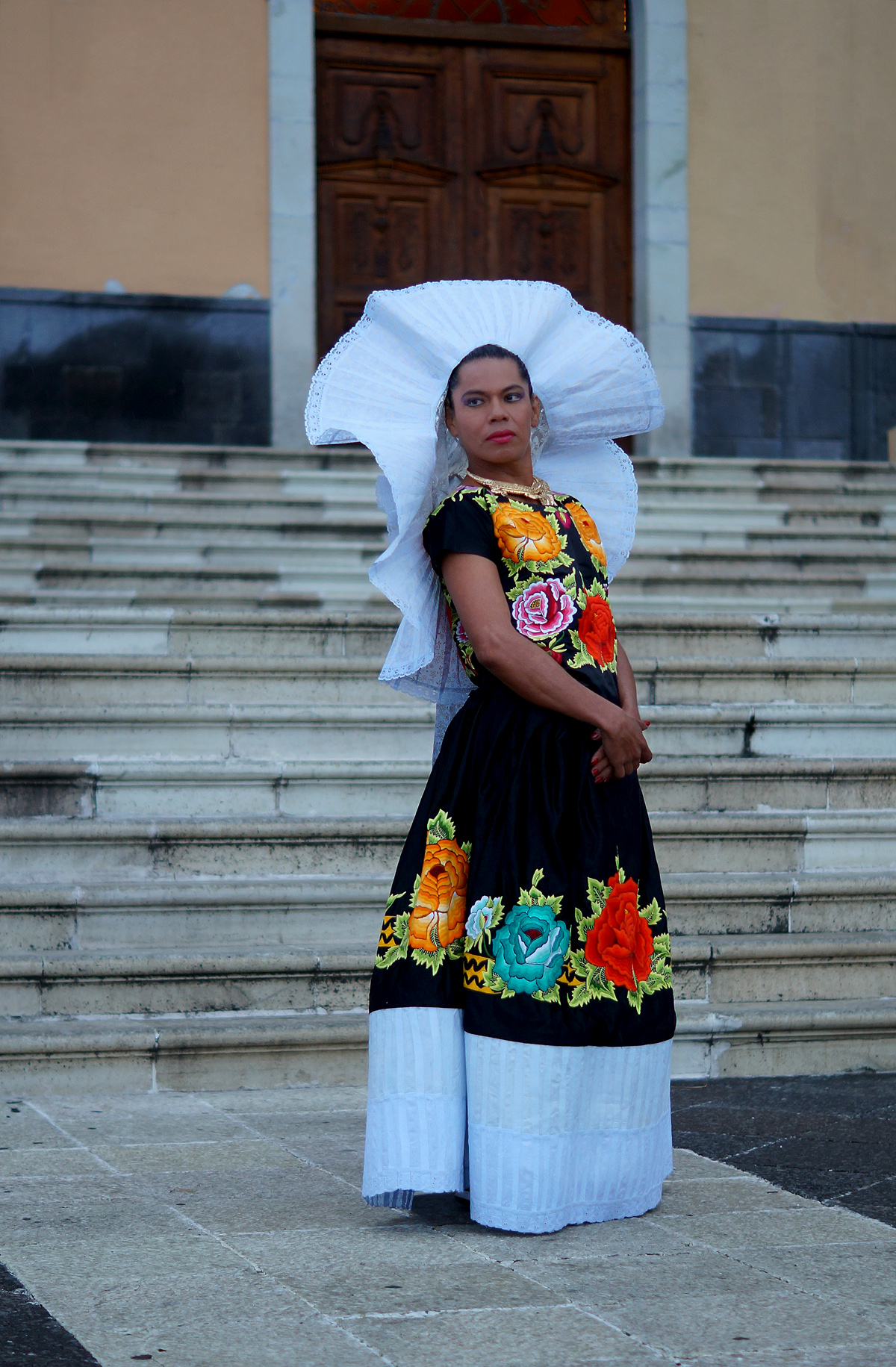

=== Muxe ===
The gender of Muxe is defined as an indigenous Zapotec third gender that defies the common binary option of female or male. Definitions are provided in Lynn Stephen's piece Sexualities and Gender in Zapotec Oaxaca and Alfredo Mirandé article Hombres Mujeres: An Indigenous Third Gender. Alfredo Mirandé defines muxes as:

"Muxes are biological males who also manifest feminine identities in their dress and attire, but they are not transsexual nor are they seeking to become women. They both self-identify and are generally recognized and accepted as a third gender, rather than as men or women, adopting characteristics of each gender."

The identity of muxe is categorized as a third gender because they do not subscribe to the binary option of male or female, nor do muxes label themselves as either of those options in any environment. Muxes are not restricted to a specific physical appearance, many muxes present themselves in a range of ways. Some muxes choose to dress in traditional female Zapotec clothing, wear makeup, or even present a masculine aesthetic. There is not a set of criteria of how muxe must present themselves, rather there is a set of expectations that both Zapotec muxes and women share.

== Designated gender roles ==
Within the Zapotec community there are specific roles and responsibilities placed on the identity of women, men, and the indigenous third gender muxes.

=== Roles of Zapotec muxes and women ===
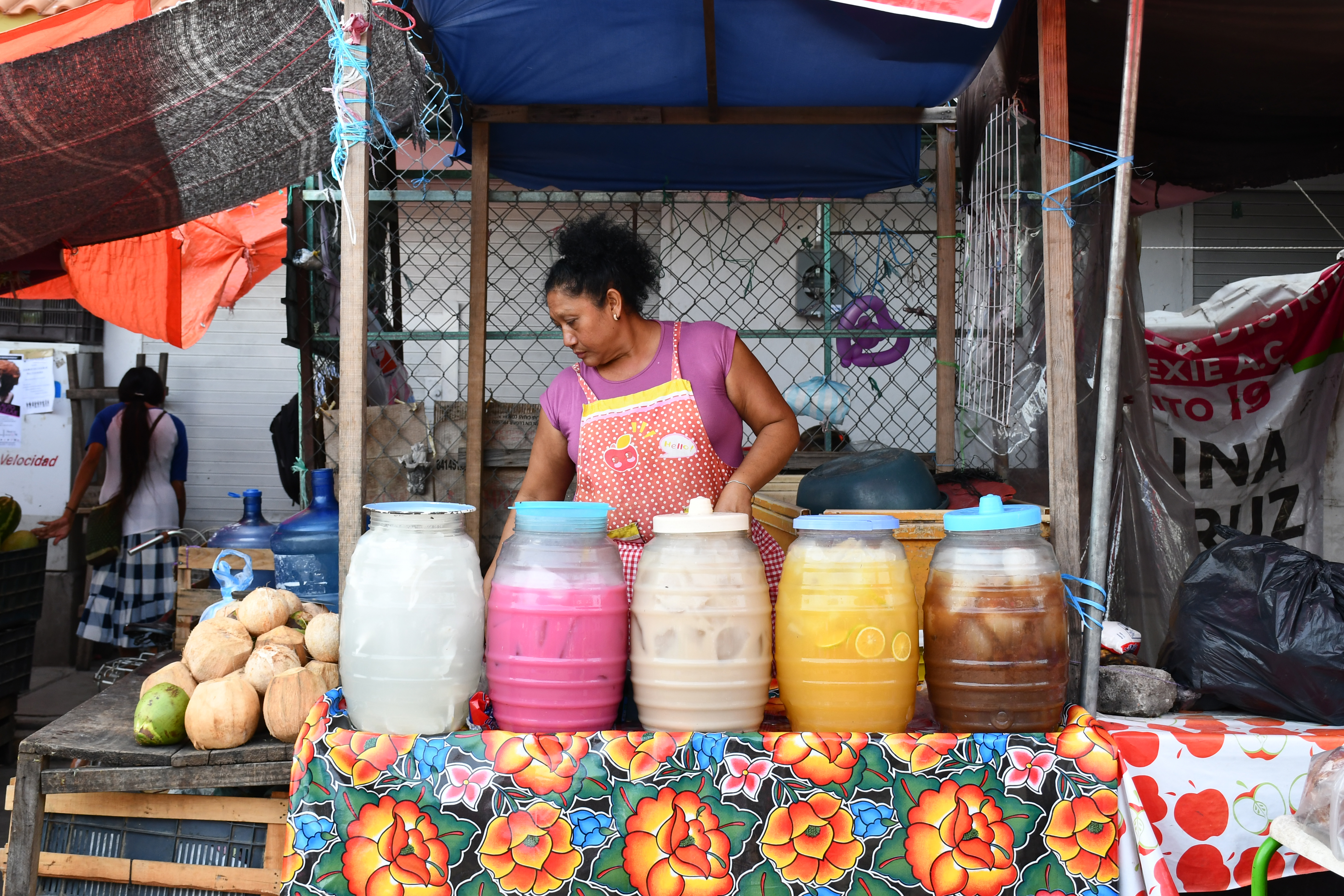

==== Workforce ====
In the case of Juchitán de Zaragoza, Oaxaca Stephen discusses how the Zapotec culture has an understanding that it is not a community that places matriarchs as designated leaders, it is more of a patriarchal community. However, the women often take on the responsibility of being leaders and the labor that comes with running the local business settings such as the mercados or the stores of the town. As mentioned in both pieces from Mirandé and Stephen, there are assigned responsibilities for women and muxes which revolve around the functionality of these local markets. Women and Muxes are often assigned responsibilities that are categorized as either “heavy work,” and “intermediate activities”. Hard labor includes working, preparing, and running the markets and annual community gathering known as “velas,” which is a regional celebration. Velas include mild labor from women and muxes because they are assigned the tasks of preparing the decorations for this celebration that happens for several. Women and Muxes also share the responsibility of embroidering clothing and decorating altars. Mirandé states that despite the separation of gender roles within the workforce, there is an appreciation of the work ethic of women and muxes; the characteristic of being “hardworking” is often identified as a feminine trait. Through the academic observations of Mirandé and Stephen, their observations describe the separation of gender roles assigned for women and muxes in comparison to men.

===== Reproduction =====
Another major responsibility that is expected specifically from cisgender women includes the role of reproduction. Within Stephen's article she argues that sexist ideology and hierarchy are still present in indigenous Zapotec communities in Oaxaca due to colonial practices such as “purity of blood”. This concept is very similar to the practice of limpieza de sangre (cleaning of blood) which entails that elite communities continuously practiced the exclusion of “the blood of Jews, Muslims, and heretics” within their genealogy. This responsibility was placed onto the shoulders of women and if reproduction were to occur with individuals a part of demographics who were seen as inferior it would directly impact the reputation of these women. Stephen argues that the practice of limpieza de sangre enforces the heteronormative role of reproduction placed onto women; a practice that is not rooted in indigenous practice or ideology, rather through colonial influences. Ultimately, concluding that this Spaniard ideology has impacted how gender and gender roles are viewed within present-day Zapotec communities.

===== Community gatherings: velas =====
A final difference in roles between men, women, and muxes that is highlighted in academic research is during the traditional velas de Juchitán de Zaragoza. Stephen introduces this annual event and defines it as “elaborate several-day celebrations involving processions, masses, food preparation and blessing, drinking, and dancing”. This is an event that takes hard work from everyone in the community. Yet, velas are “defined as women’s domain” because they do take on the majority of the work to prepare for this event. Muxes are often assigned the responsibility of crafting the traditional Zapotec clothing for those attending. Despite these examples not being representative of all the contributions of the residents, it presents a preview of the designated roles given on the basis of gender.

== Relationship between gender and sexuality ==
There are normalized themes within the Zapotec community in Oaxaca that are expected of Zapotec women, men, and muxe in terms of gender and sexuality that are different within the colonial era and present day Zapotec communities.

=== Colonial impacts of sexuality ===
The influence of colonialism is described in Stephen's article, they describe the restrictions of sexuality enforced onto Zapotec women. Stephen describes how the concept of virginity and public reputations holding societal value within Zapotec communities, specifically, in Teotitlán del Valle, Oaxaca. She continues to describe that the community enforces these standards which restrict women's sexuality through not allowing young women of the community to not walk alone once they turn 10 or 11 years old.

During the pre-colonial era, Stephen describes the observations and criticisms written by different explorers towards relationships that deviated from the expected heterosexual relationship. Observations by explorers such as Hernán Cortes to Bernal Díaz del Castillo describe their disapproval of third genders such as Lhamanas, same-sex romantic and sexual relationships (sodomy) found throughout North and Latin America. Specifically, Stephen summarizes their observations from pre-colonial locations such as Yucatán, Mexico and the indigenous groups of the Zuni and Timucua tribes. These explorers utilized homophobic language to express their disapproval, to insult indigenous third genders and non-heterosexual sexualities; Stephen argues that the explorers uses of homophobic language such as putos and cochones has resulted in present-day homophobic mentalities within the region. Stephen draws connections between the disapproval of non-heterosexual sexualities during colonial period has influenced the disapproval of LGBTQ+ communities in contemporary Oaxaca.

=== Present sexualities of Zapotec men ===
Currently, despite homophobic attitudes towards public LGBTQ+ relationships, there are less restrictions placed onto male sexuality within indigenous Zapotec communities. Men are often encouraged to experiment before getting married, this can include either engaging in sexual relationships with men, women, and muxes. This ability for men to experiment with their sexuality can be attributed to the indigenous Zapotec concept of “totemic illusion” which is discussed in Matthew C. Gutmann's piece Scoring Men: Vasectomies and The Totemic Illusion of Male Sexuality in Oaxaca. Specifically, within the region of Oaxaca de Juarez where there is a significant number of Zapotec individuals there is a high-rate of voluntary vasectomies. The increase of vasectomies' within the region is tied to the uncontrollable sexual urges that men have which is known as totemic illusion; by having this procedure done it reduces the chances of having children outside of their heterosexual marriage. Solutions and exceptions are made for male hyper-sexuality within the Zapotec community which allows for their sexual endeavors to be normalized.

=== Present sexualities of Zapotec muxes ===
In Alfredo Mirandé's article Hombres Mujeres: An Indigenous Third Gender he states that muxes discuss their sexuality in terms of the sexual roles they would take within relationships as either passive or active. Mirandé summarizes the response of various muxes who describe their sexuality in terms of passive or active roles, in this quote it describes the importance placed onto the power dynamic within sexual relationships:

“Pasivos (passives) are those who are insertees or have the penis of another man inserted into one of their orifices, usually the anus, whereas activos (actives) are inserters. According to this view, some Mexican and Latino men can and do engage in sex with other men without impugning their masculinity, as long as they retain the dominant activo or inserter position in the sexual act. Within this sexual system, gay and straight status are thus determined not by object choice, but by the respective power of the participants… Not only is the active partner not stigmatized, but he may be recognized as muy macho. Muxes simply described their partners as hombres because they assume the dominant activo inserter position”.

He also describes a general understanding that muxes do not enter relationships with other muxes and that the preference among the muxes he interviewed stated that they would rather be in a relationship with a cisgender male. Finally, Mirandé states that muxes understand that their relationships with cisgender men are usually kept from the public and not normally displayed in public spaces.

== Muxe representation ==
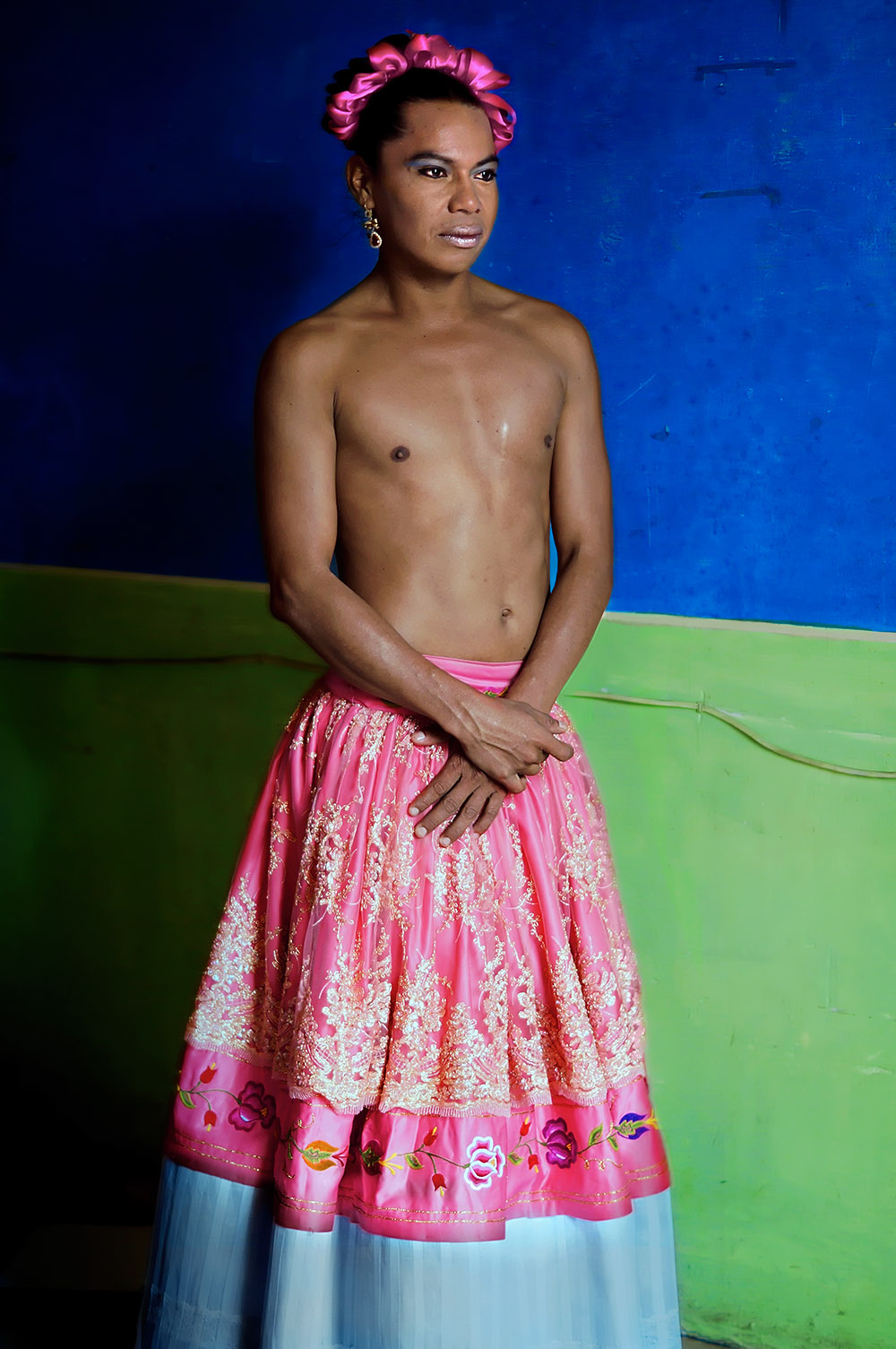

Representation of the indigenous Zapotec community, their traditions, and the third gender of muxes is seen on social platforms such as Netflix, Instagram, YouTube, and magazines. Documentaries that attempt to showcase the lives of muxes are the Third Gender: An Entrancing Look at Mexico’s Muxes | Short Film Showcase by National Geographic and Muxes -- Mexico’s Third Gender by The Guardian which can be found on YouTube. Muxes have also made the cover of Vogue México in 2019 which included the article Muxes: El Tercer Género Que Vive en México Desde Tiempo Inmemoriales by author Karina Gonzalez Ulloa. The 2019 December cover of Vogue Mexico has the portrait of Estrella, a muxe from Juchitán de Zaragoza. Estrella is also interviewed in The Guardian's documentary that was previously mentioned. Finally, a muxe named Marven Lady Tacos de Canasta has a substantial following on social media. Currently, Marven Lady Tacos de Canasta has 93.6K followers on Instagram and has been featured in the popular Netflix original series the Taco Chronicles (specifically, Taco Chronicles V1: E3 “Canasta”).
