= Colima Democratic Association =

Colima Democratic Association Asociación por la Democracia Colimense, Partido Político Estatal
- Founded: 2001
- Registered: 2002
- Dissolved: 2012
- Headquarters: Mexico City
- Ideology: Democracy
- Political position: Centre
- Colours: Green

The Colima Democratic Association (Spanish: Asociación por la Democracia Colimense, Partido Político Estatal, ADC) is a political party from the State of Colima, Mexico.

Carlos Vázquez Oldenbourg together with other politicians from Colima founded the ADC in late 2001; the party was officially established in 2002 when it received its official registration as a political party from Colima.

On the 2003 Colima state election the ADC won a seat in the Congress of Colima; On the 2003 extraordinary election the ADC joined forces with the National Action Party (PAN) and the Party of the Democratic Revolution (PRD) in an unusual alliance between the PAN-PRD and the ADC named Alianza Todos por Colima supporting candidate Antonio Morales de la Peña who lost against Gustavo Vázquez Montes.

== Dissolution ==
During the 2012 Colima state elections, The party only received 2,971 of the votes. Less than 2% than what was required by the state of Colima during that time (5,982 votes), Thus dissolving the party later that year.
