= Gustavo Vázquez Montes =

Mexican politician

Gustavo Alberto Vázquez Montes
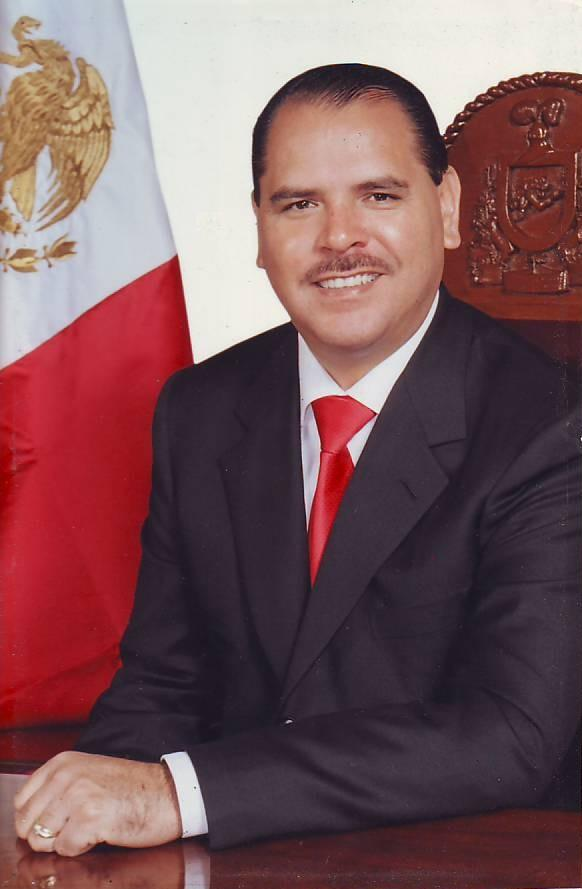

Governor of Colima
- In office January 1, 2004 – February 24, 2005
- Preceded by: Carlos Flores Dueñas
- Succeeded by: Arnoldo Ochoa González

Personal details
- Born: 16 August 1962 Tecomán, Colima
- Died: 24 February 2005 (aged 42) Tzitzio, Michoacán
- Party: Institutional Revolutionary Party
- Spouse: Norma Alicia Galindo Matias
- Education: University of Colima
- Profession: Educator and politician

Gustavo Alberto Vázquez Montes (August 16, 1962 – February 24, 2005) was a Mexican politician. At the time of his death he was serving as the Governor of Colima, representing the Institutional Revolutionary Party (PRI).

Vázquez Montes was born in Tecomán, Colima. After graduating from teacher-training college and entering politics, he served as the mayor of his hometown and as a local deputy in the Congress of Colima. He was selected as the PRI's candidate in the 2003 gubernatorial election and, after heated disputes and the annulment of the first round, he was declared the victor and began his term as Governor on January 1, 2004.

== Career ==
Vázquez Montes served as a professor of Elementary and Secondary Education. He was an official in Tecomán City Council in several administrations, alderman, civic leader of the Institutional Revolutionary Party, president of the Mexican Network of Healthy Municipalities, local deputy in the LI Legislature of the Congress of Colima, then Mayor of Tecomán, Colima from 1997 to 2000. He served again as a deputy in the LIII Legislature of the Congress of Colima, and also served as Secretary General and Chairman of the State Executive Committee of the PRI.

Vázquez Montes was president of the State Congress four times and served on the Health and Education Committees. He was a distinguished member of the Standing Conference of Local Legislators PRI and a distinguished member of the PRI National Political Council.

=== Governor ===
Vázquez Montes triumphed in the elections held on July 6, 2003, obtaining the majority of votes cast, compared to his opponent, the PAN candidate. However, regular elections were nullified by the Electoral Court of the Judicial Power of the Federation stating illegal intervention in the same of Governor Fernando Moreno Peña. Vázquez Montes was again nominated as the PRI candidate for governor in a special election that was necessary to convene. Vázquez Montes won again, again getting most of the votes cast. Vázquez Montes assumed the governorship on January 1, 2004, to conclude the period ending October 31, 2009.

== Death ==
On February 24, 2005, while traveling to Colima City from Mexico City, his six-seater Westwind 1124 aeroplane developed problems shortly after its 16h15 take-off from Toluca airport and crashed in the municipality of Tzitzio, Michoacán, 70 km to the southeast of Morelia. The governor was killed, along with the pilot, Captain Mario Torres González, and copilot, Captain Germán Ascencio Fauvet; the Colima state secretaries of tourism and finance, Roberto Preciado Cuevas and Luis Ramón Barreda Cedillo; the state's tourism director, Guillermo Díaz Zamorano; and local Coparmex president Alejandro Dávila.

In the immediate aftermath of the accident, Arnoldo Ochoa González was appointed acting governor and a special election was called for April 2005.

== See also ==
- 2005 Colima state election
