= 2003 Colima state election =

Local election in Mexico

An election for governor was held in the Mexican state of Colima on 6 July 2003, simultaneously with federal congressional midterm elections. Gustavo Vázquez Montes of the Institutional Revolutionary Party (PRI) was initially declared the winner, with 83,995 votes; second place went to the National Action Party (PAN) with 69,180, with the Party of the Democratic Revolution (PRD) in third place with 32,042. Following accusations of irregularities, the gubernatorial result was declared void by the state electoral authorities and an extraordinary election was held on December 7, 2003. Meanwhile, Carlos Flores Dueñas of the PRI served as interim governor.

Two candidates stood in the extraordinary election: Gustavo Vázquez Montes, representing an alliance of the PRI, Labour Party (PT), and Green Ecological Party of Mexico (PVEM), and Antonio Morales de la Peña of the PAN standing as the Alianza Todos por Colima candidate (an unusual combination of PAN and PRD, and the local ADC party). The state electoral institute declared Vázquez Montes the winner and he was sworn in on January 1, 2004.

Barely 14 months into his gubernatorial term, however, Vázquez Montes was killed in an airplane accident over Michoacán on February 24, 2005. Arnoldo Ochoa González of the PRI was appointed acting governor; a fresh election was held on April 10, 2005, with Silverio Cavazos – the victor in that contest, representing a PRI/PVEM/PT alliance – to be sworn in on May 5.

== See also ==
- 2005 Colima state election
