= Leticia Sosa =

Mexican politician

Senator
- In office September 1, 2006 – February 24, 2009
- Preceded by: Salvador Becerra Rodríguez
- Succeeded by: Luis Fernando Rodríguez Lomeli
- Constituency: Colima

Municipal president of Manzanillo
- In office 1998–2000
- Preceded by: José Luis Navarrete Caudillo
- Succeeded by: Rogelio Rueda Sánchez

Personal details
- Born: Martha Leticia Sosa Govea; November 25, 1950 (age 75)
- Party: National Action Party
- Website: www.marthasosasenadora.com

Martha Leticia Sosa Govea (born November 25, 1950) is a Mexican politician from Colima affiliated with the National Action Party who has served as municipal president (mayor) of the city of Manzanillo and as senator.

In 2006 she was elected to serve in the Senate of Mexico for a six-year term. She left the Senate to run for governor of the state of Colima. In 2009 she was designated the PAN candidate for the 2009 Colima state election. Sosa was defeated by the PRI candidate.
