= Pedro Galván (politician) =

Mexican politician (c. 1833–1892)

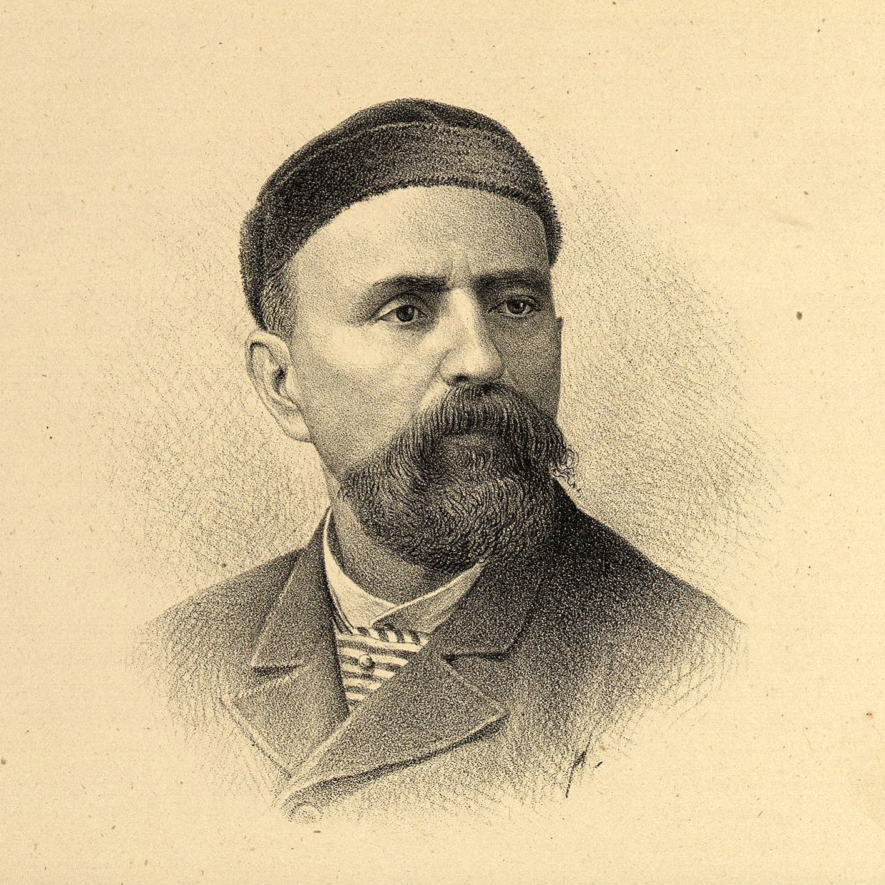
Pedro Galvan on a lithograph from 1888.

Calzada Pedro A. Galván

Pedro A. Galván (1833? - December 12, 1892) was a Mexican general, 25th governor of the Mexican state of Colima (interim), and governor of the state of Jalisco.

A main avenue in the residential area of the City of Colima bears his name.

== Military career ==
Pedro Galván began his military career in 1854 under General Ogazón and was then promoted to brigade General on the Liberal side during the Reform and Intervention wars, in which he lost a leg in battle. He took part in the Plan of Noria in 1872, alongside Porfirio Díaz.

== Political career ==
He was elected federal deputy for Jalisco in 1875 and was later elected as the 2nd Senator for that state in 1877. On 13 July of that year, he was declared a Citizen of Colima by government decree.

Difficulties in the Mexican Congress prompted the Senate to suspend the authority of Colima's government, so he was declared interim governor of Colima (June 17 - September 27, 1880). As governor, he assisted in the election of General Manuel González for president, called local elections, and embellished the town square. He gained notoriety for his honesty, frankness, and chivalrous character.

Upon retiring from the governorship he became Administrator of Maritime Customs in Manzanillo and was later re-elected as Senator in 1882. Upon the death of General Corona, he was appointed governor of Jalisco in 1889 and was later re-elected for the following term. He died while in office in 1892.

Preceded by Doroteo López	Governor of Colima; 1880 (interim)	Succeeded by Francisco Santa Cruz
Preceded by General Corona	Governor of Jalisco; 1889–1892	Succeeded by unknown
