= Antonio Barbosa Heldt =

Mexican teacher and politician

Antonio Barbosa Heldt (died September 18, 1973) was a Mexican teacher and politician, member of the Institutional Revolutionary Party. In 1973, he was elected as Governor of Colima but died before he could take office. According to official reports, the cause of death was suicide, though that determination was never fully accepted by those close to him.

== Books ==
- Como enseñar a leer y escribir (ISBN 9688604348)
- Hombres ilustres de México y lugares donde reposan sus restos

== See also ==
- Colima
