= Taco Chronicles =

American Spanish-language docuseries on Netflix

- Genre: Docuseries
- Written by: Arcadi Palerm
- Directed by: Carlos Perez Osorio
- Country of origin: United States/Mexico
- Original language: Spanish
- No. of seasons: 3
- No. of episodes: 21

Production
- Producers: Hallie Davison, Carlos Perez Osorio
- Running time: 24–33 minutes
- Production company: El Estudio

Original release
- Network: Netflix
- Release: July 12, 2019 – present

Taco Chronicles (Spanish: Las Crónicas del Taco) is an American-Mexican documentary television series focusing on tacos, Mexico's favorite street food. There is rich history and culture behind each variety of tacos, and the series tries to be both educational and stylish about the different kinds and where they come from, through interviews with food writers, experts, and owners of the stands seen on the streets, who describe them and the ingredients in depth.

It premiered on Netflix on July 12, 2019. Its second volume / season premiered on September 15, 2020.

== Episodes ==
=== Series overview ===
Series overview
Season	Title	Episodes	Originally released
Volume 1	Taco Chronicles	6	July 12, 2019
Volume 2	Taco Chronicles	7	September 15, 2020
Volume 3	Cross the Border	8	November 23, 2022

=== Volume 1 (2019) ===
No. overall	No. in season	Title	Directed by	Original release date
1	1	"Pastor"	Carlos Perez Osorio	July 12, 2019
Savory, pork-based al pastor tacos are a street-food staple of Mexico City. But they actually have origins that stem back to ancient Asia Minor.
2	2	"Carnitas"	Carlos Perez Osorio	July 12, 2019
If you like tacos, you likely know carnitas. But did you know its roots go back to the Aztecs? Take a trip to Michoacán, the world’s carnitas capital.
3	3	"Canasta"	Carlos Perez Osorio	July 12, 2019
No matter the filling, canasta tacos are truly beloved. Get to know this street-food favorite and one of its most dynamic purveyors: Lady Tacos de Canasta.
4	4	"Asada"	Carlos Perez Osorio	July 12, 2019
From Tijuana to Hermosillo to Sonora to Downtown LA, carne asada reigns supreme. But the most flavorful meat is nothing without the perfect tortilla.
5	5	"Barbacoa"	Carlos Perez Osorio	July 12, 2019
Every time barbacoa is prepared, it starts in the same place: a big hole in the ground. It doesn’t get much more humble -- or delicious -- than that.
6	6	"Guisado"	Carlos Perez Osorio	July 12, 2019
With guisados tacos, it’s not just the meat -- it’s the stew. We visit with some of the most notable "stew taco" cooks in both Mexico and Los Angeles.

=== Volume 2 (2020) ===
No. overall	No. in season	Title	Directed by	Original release date
7	1	"Suadero"	Santiago Fabregas	September 15, 2020
Urban and nocturnal, the suadero taco is the perfect hangover cure. It's the Mexican cousin to American beef brisket, but with more spice and bite.
8	2	"Cochinita"	Santiago Fabregas	September 15, 2020
The cochinita pibil is a Mayan pit-roasted pork delicacy, passed down over the centuries and preserved, even after colonization, like a sacred ritual.
9	3	"Cabrito"	Santiago Fabregas	September 15, 2020
The cabrito, or kid taco, springs from a goat herding tradition that can be traced to Iran and Lebanon. It's now become emblematic of northern Mexico.
10	4	"American Taco"	Santiago Fabregas	September 15, 2020
The American taco is, of course, an import — but much changed after assimilation! Distinguished by its hard or puffy shell, it's still delicious.
11	5	"Burrito"	Santiago Fabregas	September 15, 2020
The convenience of the burrito — a good-sized flour tortilla tucked in at both ends so nothing wrapped inside spills — is from Mexico's northern states.
12	6	"Birria"	Santiago Fabregas	September 15, 2020
To dunk or not to dunk? To spoon or not to spoon? The crucial aspect of the birria taco is its broth, a sumptuous blend of goat meat juices and spices.
13	7	"Pescado"	Santiago Fabregas	September 15, 2020
The best fish tacos come from the Mexican Pacific coast, with a nod to Japan for the crispy, tempura-like breading and emphasis on freshness.

=== Volume 3 (2022) ===
No. overall	No. in season	Title	Directed by	Original release date
14	1	"Chicago"	Carlos Perez Osorio & Santiago Fabregas	November 23, 2022
Mexicans arrived in Chicago at the beginning of the 20th century and won the heart of the "Windy City" with tacos: from carnitas and mole to birria.
15	2	"Las Vegas"	Carlos Perez Osorio & Santiago Fabregas	November 23, 2022
Everything in Las Vegas is spectacular: the shows, the hotels, the casinos... and the tacos. Pastor, birria, carnitas and even Cheetos are on the menu.
16	3	"New York"	Carlos Perez Osorio & Santiago Fabregas	November 23, 2022
The Big Apple is not an easy place for immigrants to adapt to, but it's worth it. People from Puebla and Oaxaca conquer New York with their tacos.
17	4	"San Antonio"	Carlos Perez Osorio & Santiago Fabregas	November 23, 2022
San Antonio has deep ties to its Mexican roots. The mix of cultural influences has resulted in beef barbacoa, pastor of sirloin and breakfast tacos.
18	5	"Los Angeles"	Carlos Perez Osorio & Santiago Fabregas	November 23, 2022
Los Angeles has the largest population of Mexicans outside Mexico... that's why there are tacos of all types and sizes on seemingly every corner!
19	6	"Dallas"	Carlos Perez Osorio & Santiago Fabregas	November 23, 2022
Dallas never stops reinventing itself, and its food is an example of this: octopus carnitas, lobster and brisket tacos are part of the city's unique menu.
20	7	"Phoenix"	Carlos Perez Osorio & Santiago Fabregas	November 23, 2022
The connection between Phoenix and Sonora is as strong as the desert's heat. The ingredients of this land, like mesquite and chiltepin, elevate the taco.
21	8	"San Diego"	Carlos Perez Osorio & Santiago Fabregas	November 23, 2022
It doesn't matter which side of the Mexico-US border you're on: The taco is a conduit capable of transporting you home, to family or to a warm memory.

== Release ==
The full first season, consisting of six episodes, premiered on Netflix streaming on July 12, 2019.
