= Cuauhtémoc, Colima =

Cuauhtémoc
- Municipal seat and town
- Location in Mexico
- Coordinates: 19°19′41″N 103°36′10″W
- Country: Mexico
- State: Colima
- Municipality: Cuauhtémoc
- Elevation: 940 m (3,080 ft)

Population (2005)
  - Total: 7,513
- Postal code: 28500
- Area code: 312

Cuauhtémoc is a town in the Mexican state of Colima. It serves as the municipal seat for the surrounding municipality of Cuauhtémoc. In the 2005 INEGI Census, it reported a total population of 7,513.

The name honours the last tlatoani of the Aztec people, Cuauhtemoc.

In 2013 the municipality became the first in Colima to perform a same-sex marriage.

== Geography ==
=== Climate ===
Climate data for Cuauhtémoc (1991–2020)
Month	Jan	Feb	Mar	Apr	May	Jun	Jul	Aug	Sep	Oct	Nov	Dec	Year
Record high °C (°F)	37.0 (98.6)	38.0 (100.4)	38.0 (100.4)	38.0 (100.4)	40.0 (104.0)	39.0 (102.2)	38.5 (101.3)	37.5 (99.5)	38.0 (100.4)	38.0 (100.4)	38.5 (101.3)	37.0 (98.6)	40.0 (104.0)
Mean daily maximum °C (°F)	29.8 (85.6)	30.7 (87.3)	31.8 (89.2)	33.0 (91.4)	33.5 (92.3)	32.0 (89.6)	31.2 (88.2)	31.1 (88.0)	30.1 (86.2)	31.1 (88.0)	31.1 (88.0)	30.0 (86.0)	31.3 (88.3)
Daily mean °C (°F)	22.5 (72.5)	23.1 (73.6)	24.0 (75.2)	25.2 (77.4)	26.3 (79.3)	26.0 (78.8)	25.4 (77.7)	25.3 (77.5)	24.8 (76.6)	25.1 (77.2)	24.3 (75.7)	23.1 (73.6)	24.6 (76.3)
Mean daily minimum °C (°F)	15.3 (59.5)	15.5 (59.9)	16.2 (61.2)	17.3 (63.1)	19.0 (66.2)	19.9 (67.8)	19.7 (67.5)	19.4 (66.9)	19.4 (66.9)	19.1 (66.4)	17.5 (63.5)	16.1 (61.0)	17.9 (64.2)
Record low °C (°F)	7.0 (44.6)	7.0 (44.6)	7.5 (45.5)	8.0 (46.4)	8.0 (46.4)	10.5 (50.9)	14.0 (57.2)	14.0 (57.2)	13.0 (55.4)	11.5 (52.7)	7.0 (44.6)	7.0 (44.6)	7.0 (44.6)
Average precipitation mm (inches)	13.6 (0.54)	16.4 (0.65)	10.7 (0.42)	0.0 (0.0)	8.1 (0.32)	196.0 (7.72)	247.1 (9.73)	273.3 (10.76)	305.0 (12.01)	154.2 (6.07)	20.6 (0.81)	6.3 (0.25)	1,251.3 (49.26)
Average precipitation days (≥ 0.1 mm)	1.5	1.2	0.7	0.2	2.4	14.4	19.9	21.3	19.4	10.0	2.3	1.0	94.3
Source: Servicio Meteorologico Nacional
