= Cuauhtémoc Municipality, Colima =

Cuauhtémoc
- Municipality
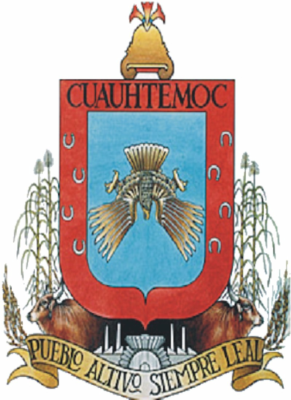
- Coat of arms

- Municipality of Cuauhtémoc in the state of Colima

- Location in Mexico
- Coordinates: 19°19′41″N 103°36′10″W
- Country: Mexico
- State: Colima
- Municipal seat: Cuauhtémoc, Col.
- Municipality created: 15 January 1915

Area
  - Total: 373.2 km^{2} (144.1 sq mi)
- Elevation: 940 m (3,080 ft)

Population (2005)
  - Total: 25,576
  - Density: 68.53/km^{2} (177.5/sq mi)
- Postal code: 28500
- Area code: 312

Cuauhtémoc is a municipality in the Mexican state of Colima. Its municipal seat is the city of Cuauhtémoc, Colima.

The municipality of Cuauhtémoc covers a total surface area of 373.2 km^{2}. In the 2005 INEGI Census, it reported a total population of 25,576 (down from 26,771 five year earlier), of whom 7,513 lived in the municipal seat.

The municipality was created on 15 January 1915. Its name honours the last tlatoani of the Aztec people, Cuauhtemoc.

== Settlements in the municipality ==
Locality	Population
Municipal total	25,576
Cuauhtémoc (municipal seat)	7,513
Quesería	8,133
El Trapiche	2,700
Alcaraces	1,800
Buenavista	1,200

All the municipality's other settlements have fewer than 1,000 inhabitants.

== Government ==
=== Municipal presidents ===
Term	Municipal president	Political party	Notes
1919	Luis Zamora Guízar		
1920	Valentín Mendoza		
1921	J. Jesús Curiel		
1922	Toribio Rodríguez		
1923	Filomeno Preciado		
1924	Miguel Tejada Rosas		
1925	Jesús Vizcaíno		
1926	Miguel Tejada Rosas		
1926	Rafael Curiel		
1927	Francisco Velasco		
1928-1929	Benito Tejeda Rosas		
1930	Anastacio García	PNR	
1931	Heliodoro Bayardo	PNR	
1931	J. Trinidad Santa Ana	PNR	
1931	Raymundo Preciado	PNR	
1932	??	PNR	
1933-1934	Anastacio García	PNR	
1935	Amado Barbosa	PNR	
1935	Ildefonso González	PNR	
1936	J. Trinidad Santa Ana	PNR	
1937	Ramón Barbosa	PNR	
1937	Jesús Muñoz	PNR	
1938	Amado Barbosa	PNR	
1938	Leopoldo Heredia	PRM	
1939-1940	J. Concepción Meza	PRM	
1940	Rafael Curiel	PRM	
1941	Florencio Larios T.	PRM	
1942	Víctor González C.	PRM	
1943-1945	Rafael Curiel	PRM	
1946-1948	Francisco Velasco Galindo	PRI	
1949-1950	Porfirio González Curiel	PRI	
1951	Carlos Zamora Ceballos	PRI	
1951	Irineo González	PRI	
1952-1954	Rafael Tejada Ochoa	PRI	
1955	Vicente Silva Preciado	PRI	
1956-1958	José Preciado González	PRI	
1959-1961	Gabino Pinto Solís	PRI	
1962-1963	Jorge Velasco Márquez	PRI	
1964	José Tejada Velasco	PRI	
1965	David Díaz Romero	PRI	
1966-1967	Gonzalo Verduzco Curiel	PRI	
1968-1970	Valentín Santa Ana Ugarte	PRI	
1971	Rodolfo Núñez Silva	PRI	
1972-1973	Rafael Ávalos C.	PRI	
1974-1976	Vicente Silva Preciado	PRI	
1977-1979	Rodolfo González Rodríguez	PRI	
1980-1982	Librado Silva García	PRI	
1982	Lino Romero Velasco	PRI	
1983-1985	Alfredo Romero Velasco	PRI	
1986-1988	Epigmenio Plascencia Rangel	PRI	
1989-1991	L. Humberto Santa Ana Ugarte	PRI	
1992-1994	Ricardo Galindo Velasco	PRI	
1995-1997	Salvador Solís Aguirre	PRI	
1998-2000	José de Jesús Plascencia Herrera	PRI	
2000-2003	César Ceballos Gómez	PRI	
2003-2006	Salvador Solís Aguirre	PRI	
2006-2009	José Luis Aguirre Campos	PRI; PVEM	Coalition "Alliance for Colima"
15/10/2009-14/10/2012	José de Jesús Plascencia Herrera	PRI	
15/10/2012-14/10/2015	Indira Vizcaíno Silva	PRD	
15/10/2015-23/03/2018	Rafael Mendoza Godínez	PAN	He applied for temporary leave, to run for reelection
24/03/2018-2018	Moisés Morán Gallegos	PAN	Acting municipal president
2018-09/12/2020	Rafael Mendoza Godínez	PAN	He was reelected on 01/07/2018. Resumed. Applied for temporary leave again
10/12/2020-14/01/2021	Julio Borjas Cárdenas	PAN	Acting municipal president
15/01/2021-14/10/2021	Rafael Mendoza Godínez	PAN	Resumed
15/10/2021-14/10/2024	Gabriela Mejía Martínez	PAN; PRI; PRD	Coalition "It Goes for Colima"
15/10/2024-	María Guadalupe Solís Ramírez	Morena; PVEM; PT	
