= University of Colima =

Mexican public university

- Universidad de Colima
- Former name: People's University of Colima (Universidad Popular de Colima)
- Type: Public university
- Established: 16 September 1940
- Affiliations: ANUIES, CUMEX, CONAHEC
- Rector: Dr. Christian Jorge Torres Ortiz Zermeño
- Faculty: 912
- Undergraduates: 9461
- Postgraduates: 603
- Location: Colima, Colima, Mexico; 19°14′55″N 103°41′55″W
- Campus: Several across the state
- Mascot: Parrots (Loros)
- Website: www.ucol.mx

The University of Colima (in Spanish: Universidad de Colima) is a Mexican public university with several campuses across the state of Colima, bordering the Pacific Ocean. It was created on September 16, 1940 by the President Lázaro Cárdenas as People's University of Colima (Universidad Popular de Colima), and intended to serve the educational needs of the Michoacán, Jalisco, and Colima.

The University's library system holds over 93,127 volumes.

== Description ==
The University of Colima was created with the name of People's University of Colima on September 16, 1940. On August 25, 1962, which is granted autonomy and is separated from the state education system.

== History ==
The institution was founded on September 16, 1940, following the education philosophy of President Lázaro Cárdenas del Río (1934–1940). Given the young feel of Colima, the governor, Colonel Pedro Torres Ortiz (1939–1943), commissioned the project of what was later to be University Public Education Director General, Lieutenant Colonel and Professor Rubén Vizcarra.

Currently enrollment is 12,367 students in high school, 10,214 in professional and associate degrees, and 604 in graduate school. The university offers 17 options in the high school level, ten of APO, 58 degree, 11 specialties, 22 master's degrees and 9 doctoral degrees, which are held on the campuses of Manzanillo, Tecomán, Colima (Central and North campuses), Coquimatlán and Villa de Álvarez. The university has 40 undergraduate education programs classified at level 1 of the Register of the CIEES programs. Its academic staff consists of 427 full-time teachers, where 90.6% have graduate degrees.

== Assessment system ==
The system is based on three exams for each subject. These tests are performed during the regular academic term. The student is considered approved if the subject receives (in the three exams) an average rating of eight. If the matter is not approved by exams, the student has the right to regular review, which applies at the end of the school year and includes all content of this field.

At the University of Colima's ratings are based on a scale from 0.0 to 10.0. The maximum score is 10.0, and 6.0 is the minimum passing grade.
