= Congress of Colima =

Legislature of Colima, Mexico

Congress of Colima Congreso del Estado de Colima
- LXI Legislature

Type
- Type: Unicameral

Structure
- Seats: 25 diputados
- Political groups: MORENA (11) PT (3) PVEM (3) PRI (3) PAN (2) MC (2) PNA (1)
- Length of term: 3 years
- Authority: Political Constitution of the Free and Sovereign State of Colima
- Salary: $44,185 pesos per month

Elections
- Voting system: 16 with first-past-the-post and 9 with proportional representation
- Last election: 2 June 2024
- Next election: 2027

Meeting place
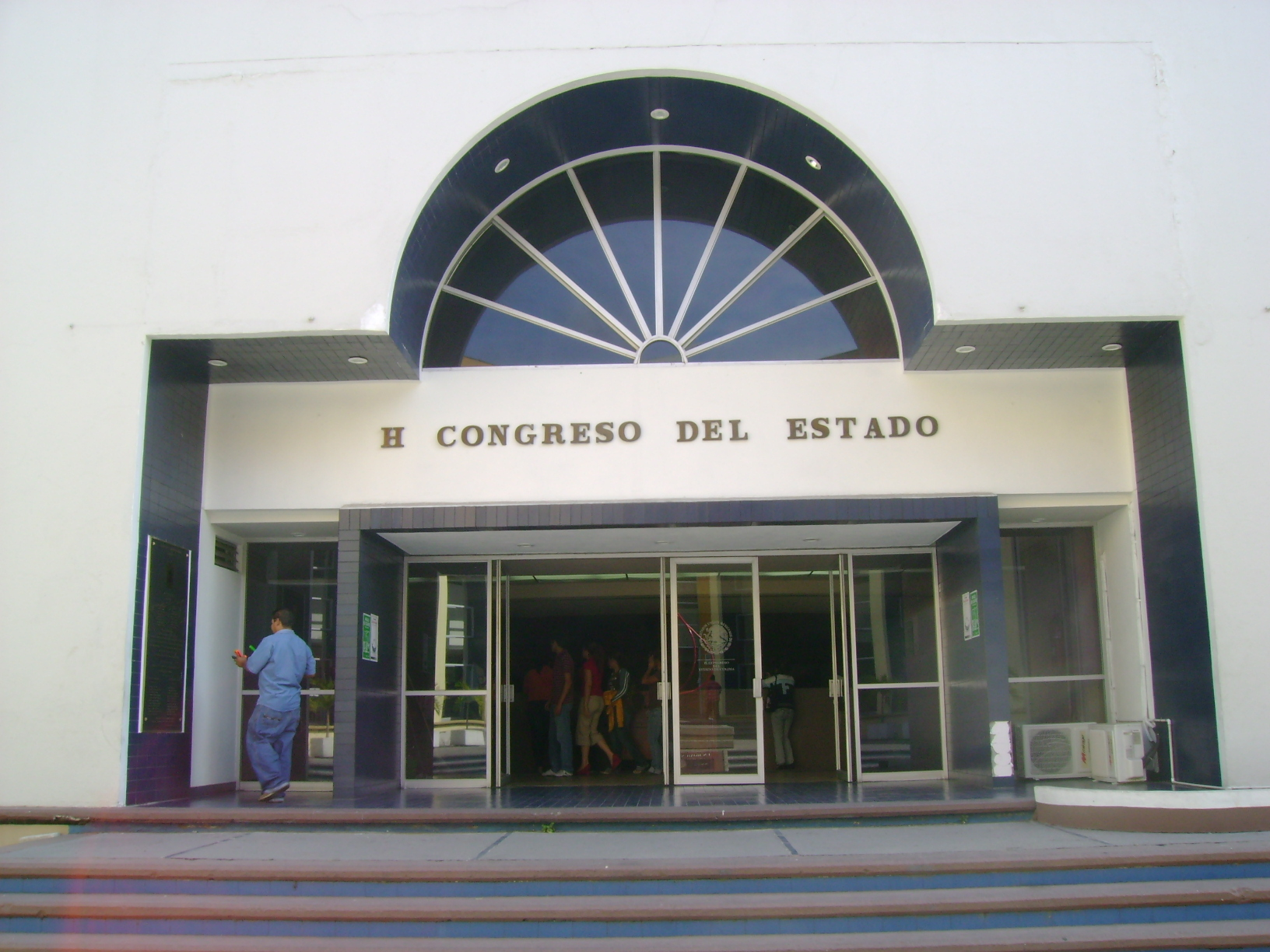
- Calzada Galván esquina Los Regalado Centro, Colima, Colima, Mexico

Website
- congresocol.gob.mx

The Congress of the State of Colima (Spanish: Congreso del Estado de Colima), or simply Congress of Colima, is the legislative branch of the government of the State of Colima. The Congress of Colima is a unicameral legislature.

The Congress consist of 25 local deputies (16 elected by the first-past-the-post system and 9 by proportional representation). Deputies are elected to serve for a three-year term.

Since its installation the congress has been renewed 59 times, hence the current session of the Congress of Colima (whose term lasts from 2024 to 2027) is known as the LXI Legislature.

== Current composition by party ==
The LXI Legislature of the Congress of Colima consists of 25 deputies.

Party	Deputies
Morena	11
Labor Party	3
Ecologist Green Party of Mexico	3
Institutional Revolutionary Party	3
National Action Party	2
Citizens' Movement	2
New Alliance Party	1

== See also ==
- List of Mexican state congresses
