= Madrid, Colima =

Madrid
- Town
- Location in Mexico
- Coordinates: 19°05′N 103°52′W
- Country: Mexico
- State: Colima
- Municipality: Tecomán
- Named for: Miguel de la Madrid

Population (2010)
  - Total: 3,790

Madrid is a town of Tecomán Municipality, in the state of Colima, western Mexico. It is named because the Madrid family at the time in which was founded here, this family includes Coronel Mariano de la Madrid, Miguel de la Madrid Guerrero (1827 - 1895), Governor of Colima, Enrique O. De la Madrid (1862-1935), Miguel de la Madrid and Mario de la Madrid which should be named in their honor.
