= La Petatera =

Plaza in Villa de Álvarez, Colima, Mexico

Coordinates: 19°16′10″N 103°45′24″W

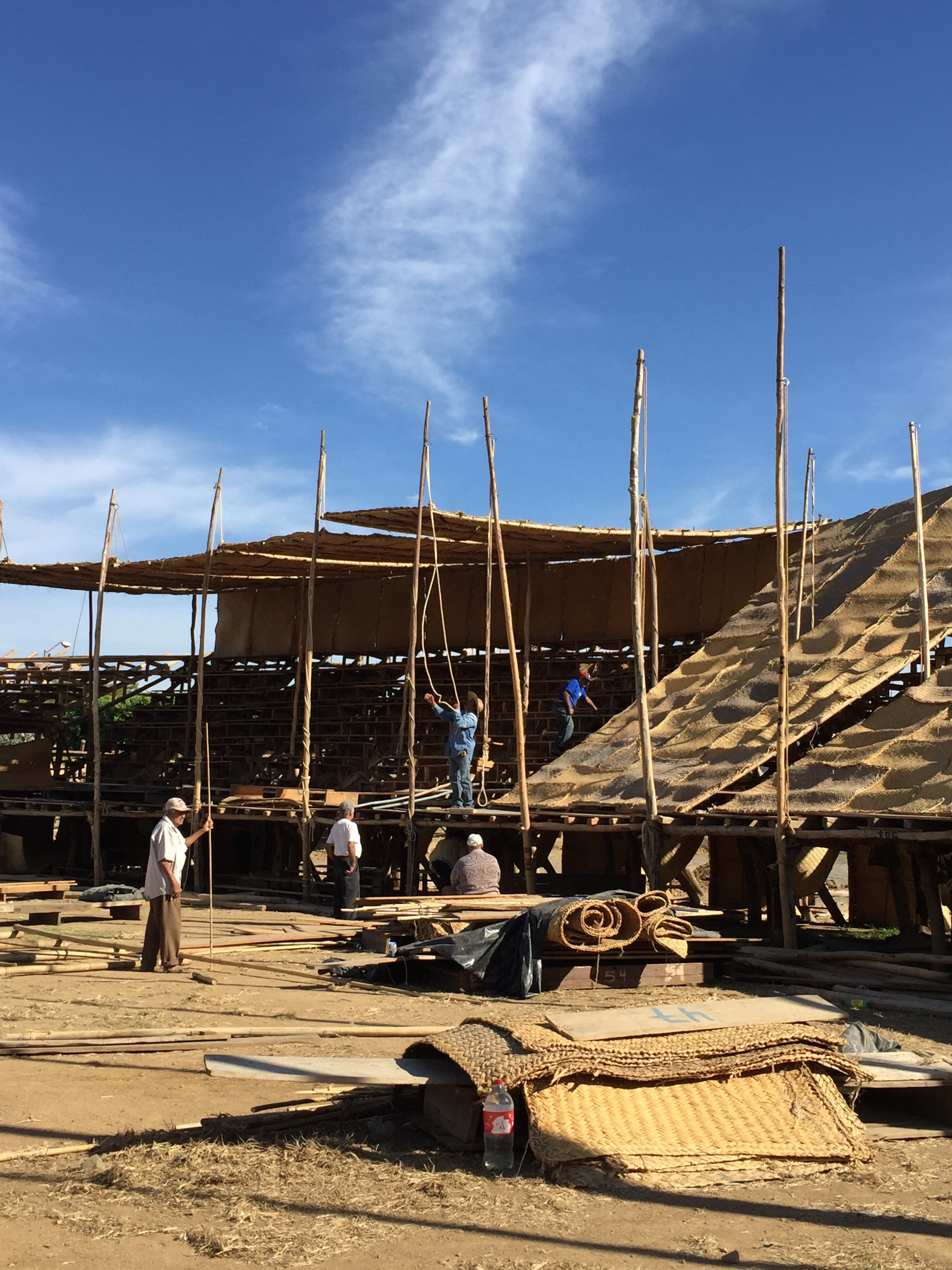
Construction of La Petatera in Villa de Álvarez, Colima, Mexico

The Plaza de Toros La Petatera is located in Villa de Álvarez in the state of Colima, Mexico. This plaza is constructed and rebuilt annually in the month of February with a variety of materials like wood, petate, bamboo, ixtle and a couple more natural resources with regional methods that span over 160 years of tradition in Colima. It is the only structure in the world made with petate.

La Petatera is also considered intangible cultural heritage of México.

== Origins ==
Back in the XVII century there were a series of fires and earthquakes that destroyed 77% of the homes that existed in 1658. The population thought the city was cursed and thought about leaving, but the mayor prohibited so and said the city required a patron saint. A couple people were submitted to become patron saint, including Felipe de Jesús. There was a randomized selection and Felipe de Jesús came out the three times they chose a card. Rumors and tradition says his spirit suggested himself to be the patron saint. Ever since that year there are festivities that are devoted to him.

The first documentation of La Petatera being done dates from 1854.

== Construction ==
The construction starts when a dot is marked with a stake at the center of the land where it will be built.

Its structure has a wood framework from the region that gives it the ability to absorb or transmit force with the help of stringers and rollers. The structure is kept together with cord and ixtle. Its architecture is complemented with the bullpen and stable, made with the same materials.

There is no available documentation on how to trace the layout nor where its vertices are set. Its tracing could be compared to that used by the ancient Egyptians who also used cords with marks on predetermined lengths.

La Petatera has terraces that are divided in 70 or 72 sections, although these used to be 103. Each of the divisions has a 2.5m inner radius and a 3.5m outer radius, with each being 9 meter deep. These sections are assigned by the director to the concessionaires or families and supervises the sections with both a 2.5 meter pole or a 5-meter pole.

The article ARCHITECTURE WITHOUT PLANS; ‘LA PETATERA’ BULLRING mentions the following materials as being necessary for the construction:

Each concessionary brings five wooden posts, five plinths, three long laths and three short ones, one and a half dozen planks for the stall, the seats and the stirrups, half a dozen bars for the bullring, four dozen petate mats, six mooring ropes and the ladders which give access to the front rows.

— Calduch Cervera, J.; Elizondo Mata, MF.; Mendoza Pérez, LA.; González De Loza, JR.; Huerta Sanmiguel, R., p. 131

Because the materials are constantly reused, these need to be checked by the foreman to see if all are in acceptable conditions to be used.

Regarding its cost, the families in charge of the protection of the materials used to build it say that it sometimes turns out to be rather expensive or inexpensive depending on the number of times the petate can be reused. Low costs are attributed to a small amount of labour being required in the construction and the materials being stored nearby. Since the cost of materials and labour is cheap, the construction and reconstruction remains profitable due to the sections being lent. The fact that the construction is a community focused event further reduces costs.

The administrator of the Patronage of the Charro Taurinos Celebrations of Villa de Álvarez, has said the following statement regarding the torero attendance since the torero introduction in 1943:

Aquí han actuado famosos toreros como Silverio Pérez, Carlos Arruza, Luis Procuna, Joselito Huerta, Luis Castro, Fermín Rivera, Manolo Mejía, Eloy Cavazos, Eulalio López, Alejandro Silveti, Cristina Sánchez, los rejoneadores Gastón Santos, Pablo Hermoso de Mendoza.

— Carlos Alberto Montes Carbajal, Excelsior

The square, despite its construction, has never collapsed. Its structure is resistant to earthquakes. The following has been said by Desiderio Contreras, the man who used to be the La Petatera building director on why it has never fallen: we take care of all details in its construction

It has the capacity to hold about 5000 people. It has a 60-meter diameter.

In July 2013, La Petatera is declared a cultural heritage of the State of Colima according to the IBOOC.

In March 2019, La Petatera got declared Exemplary Architectural Heritage Built In Wood by the ICOMOS, part of the UNESCO.

It was declared Artistic Monument of the Nation by the Instituto Nacional de Bellas Artes, at an unspecified date, although done between 2012 and 2014.

== Location ==
The San Felipe de Jesús chapel is located in the Llano neighborhood.
