= Colimotl =

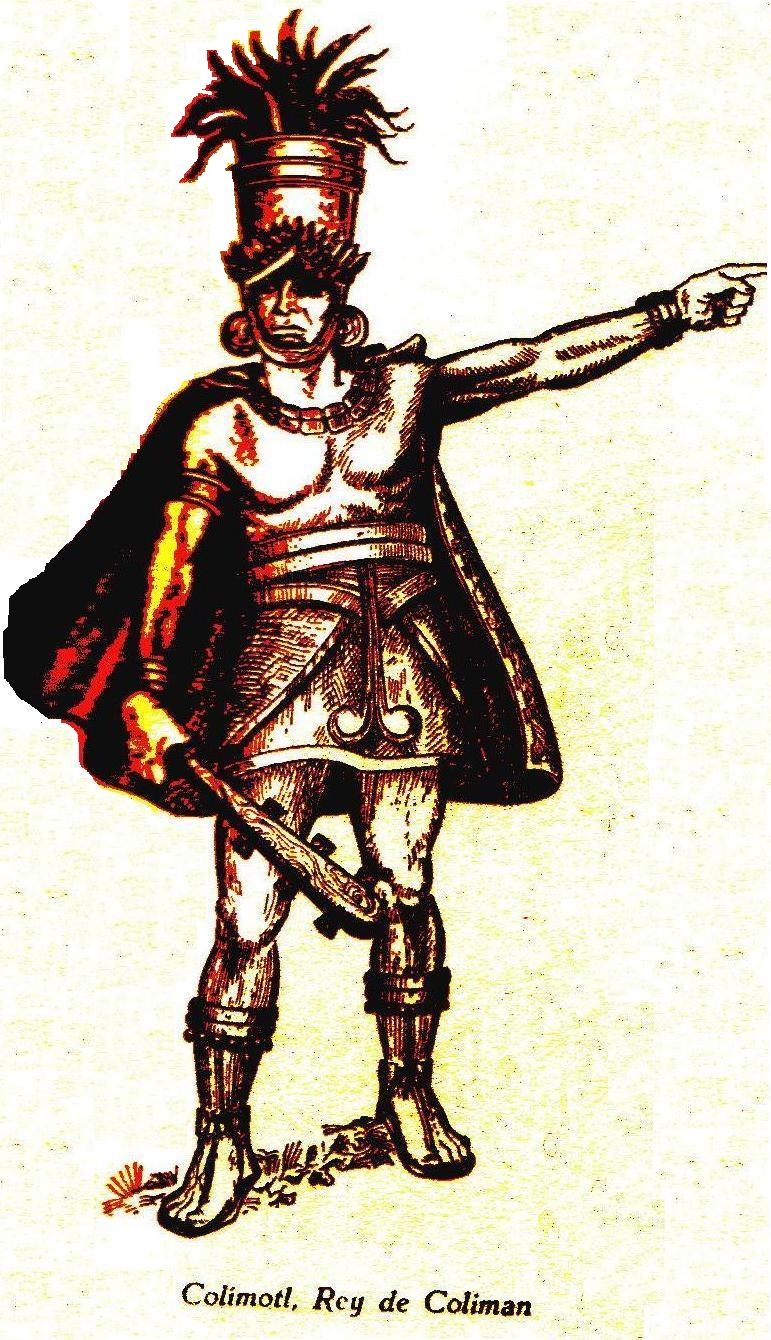
Modern depiction of Colimotl

Hueytlatoani Colimotl or Rey Coliman is a mythical and possibly historical figure who is considered a symbol of the Mexican state of Colima. According to legend, he was the last emperor of the Teco people, who inhabited the region which became Colima until the Spanish conquest of the Aztec Empire. Colimotl is known for leading a rebellion against the Spanish conquest. His army defeated the Spaniards in two battles at Trojes and Palenque de Tecoman before falling in the Battle of Alima near modern-day Tecomán, at which Colimotl was killed.

Despite the uncertainty over his existence and the facts of his life, Colimotl's resistance to Spanish conquest has made him a popular symbolic figure in modern-day Colima. In a survey conducted in the 1990s to determine the cultural symbols of several Mexican states, more than 80% of Colimans chose Colimotl as a symbol of Colima. He is commemorated by a statue in Colima City, which was erected in 1955 and designed by Juan F. Olaguíbel.

== History ==
At first, he fought in battles against the Purépechas during the great Saltpeter War. In Zacoalco, his victory led him to become a great Huey Tlatoani, he received the investiture of King or Great Lord of the fertile lands of Sayula, Zapotlán and Amula, whose caciques had to pay him tribute.

During the Spanish conquest and colonization, he declared himself the defender of his people, whose language was a western variant of Nahuatl. With the support of his people, he fought against a powerful and well-equipped army made up of Purépechas, who had allied themselves with the Spanish.

In the battle of Alima, in the municipality of Tecomán, Colima lost his life.

At the entrance to the capital city of the state of Colima and as a tribute to its prestigious person there is a statue surrounded by a hemicycle decorated with bas-reliefs and a plaque whose text exalts the greatness of Colímotl, which says: "Colima exalts here the virtues of your lineage, as a definition of patriotism."

Colímotl is only mentioned in the Letters of Relation of Hernán Cortés, in the Miscellaneous Chronicle of the Holy Province of Jalisco by Fray Antonio Tello, and in the Historical Memory of the Conquest of Jalisco by Fray [Antonio Frejes].
