= Colima =

State of Mexico

Colima Cōlīma (Nahuatl)
- State
- Free and Sovereign State of Colima; Estado Libre y Soberano de Colima (Spanish); Tlahtohcayotl Cōlīma (Nahuatl)
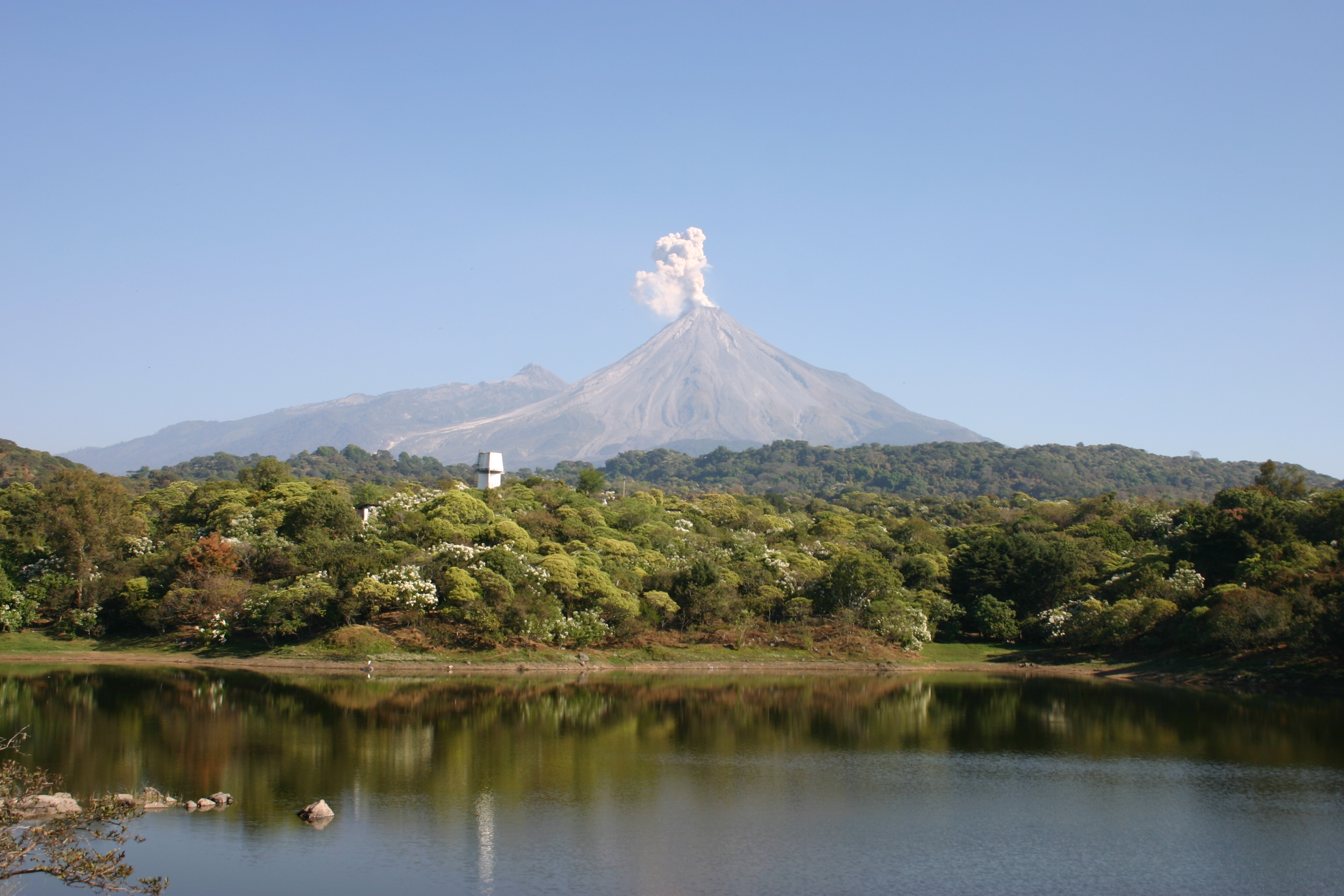
- Volcán de Colima

- Coat of arms
- Motto: El temple del brazo es vigor en la tierra (The spirit of the arm is force on earth)
- State of Colima within Mexico
- Coordinates (top): 19.1°N 103.9°W
- Country: Mexico
- Capital: Colima
- Largest city: Manzanillo
- Largest metro: Greater Colima
- Admission: December 9, 1856
- Order: 23rd

Government
  - Governor: Indira Vizcaíno Silva (Morena)
  - Senators: Joel Padilla Peña (PT); Gricelda Valencia de la Mora (Morena); Gabriela Benavides Cobos (PVEM)
  - Deputies: Federal deputies: • Rosa María Bayardo Cabrera; • María del Carmen Zúñiga Cuevas; • Ximena Puente De La Mora; • María Liduvina Sandoval Mendoza; • Claudia Valeria Yáñez Centeno y Cabrera

Area
  - Total: 5,627 km^{2} (2,173 sq mi)
- Ranked 28th
- Highest elevation: 3,820 m (12,530 ft)

Population (2020)
  - Total: 731,391
  - Rank: 32nd
  - Density: 130.0/km^{2} (336.6/sq mi)
  - Rank: 9th
- Demonym(s): Colimense, Colimote

GDP
  - Total: MXN 169 billion (US$8.4 billion) (2022)
  - Per capita: US$11,010 (2022)
- Time zone: UTC−6 (CST)
- Postal code: 28
- Area code: Area codes: • 312; • 313; • 314
- ISO 3166 code: MX-COL
- HDI: ▲0.805 very high Ranked 13th of 32
- Website: Official website

Colima, (Note: Spanish pronunciation: [koˈlima]) officially the Free and Sovereign State of Colima, (Note: Spanish: Estado Libre y Soberano de Colima) is among the 31 states that make up the 32 federated entities of Mexico. It shares its name with its capital and main city, Colima.

Colima is a small state of western Mexico on the central Pacific coast, and includes the four oceanic Revillagigedo Islands. Mainland Colima shares borders with the states of Jalisco and Michoacán. In addition to the capital city of Colima, the main cities are Manzanillo, Villa de Alvarez and Tecomán. Colima is the fourth smallest state in Mexico and has the smallest population, but has one of Mexico's highest standards of living and the lowest unemployment. It is also the state with the highest murder rate per capita and one of the highest crime rates, due to its ports being a contested area for cartels.

== Geography ==
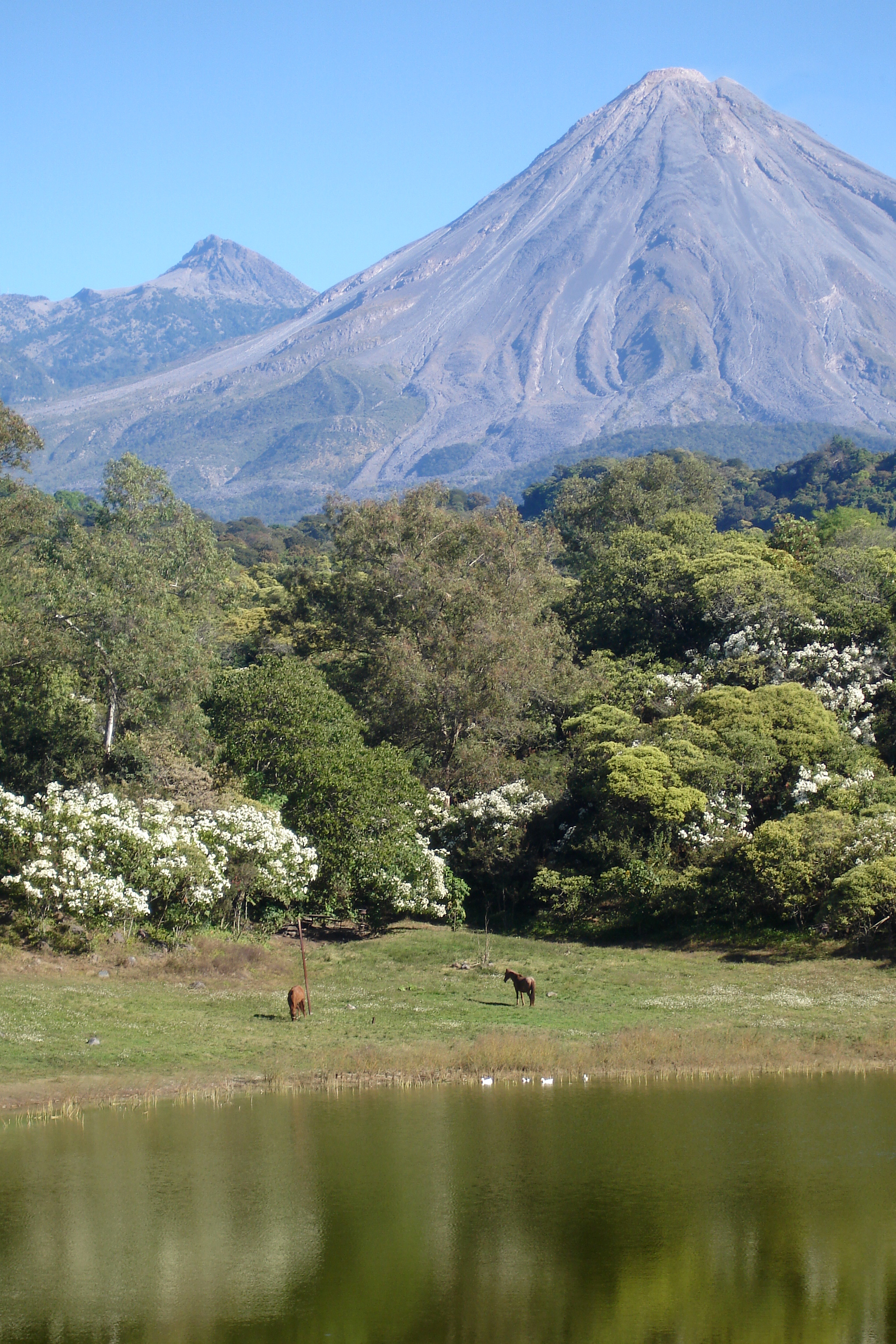
View of the volcanoes from Carrizalillos Lake

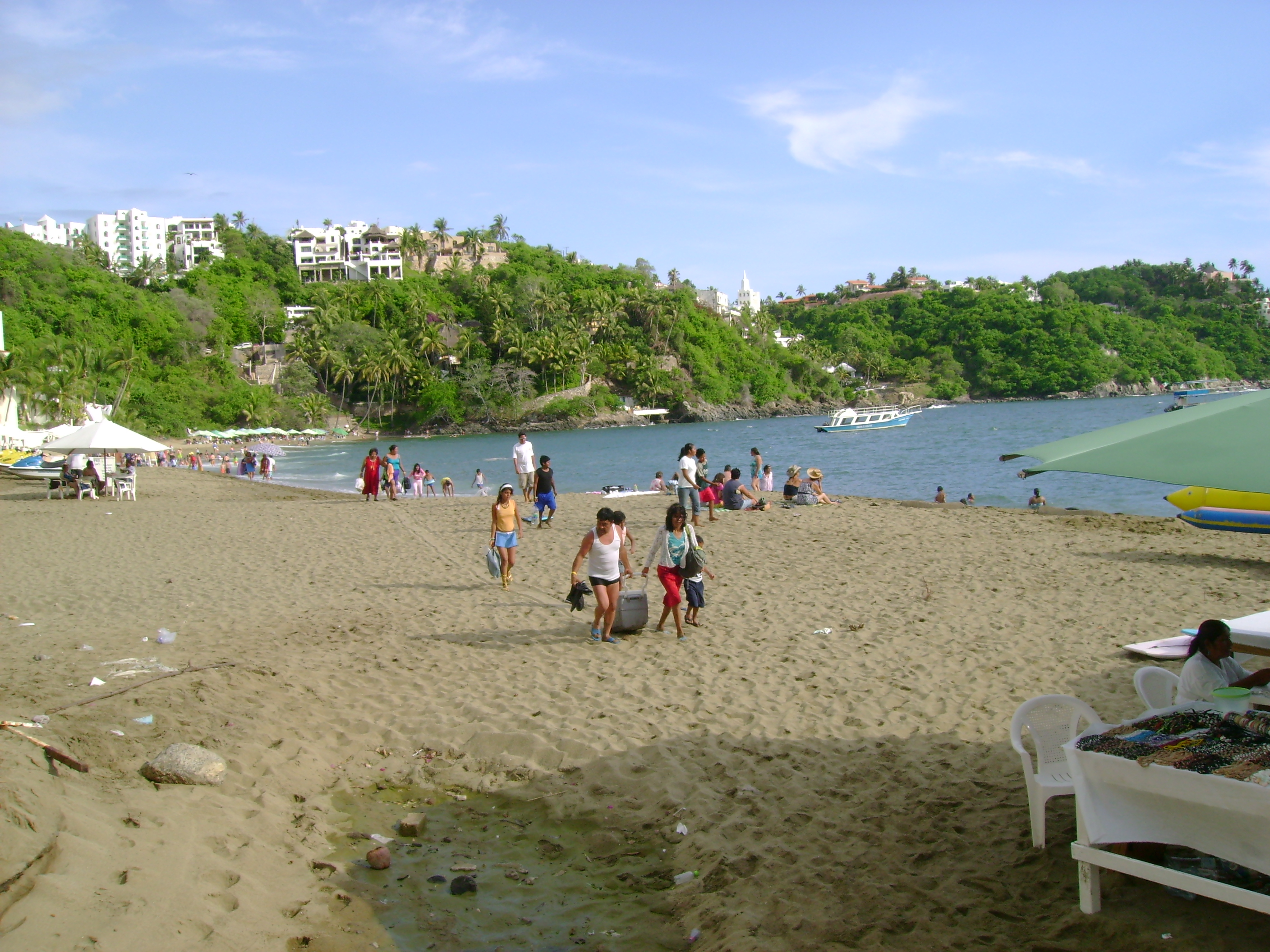
La Audiencia Beach in Manzanillo

The state covers a territory of 5,455 km^{2} and is the fourth smallest federal entity after Tlaxcala, Morelos and the Federal District of Mexico City, containing only 0.3% of the country's total territory. The state is in the middle of Mexico's Pacific coast, bordered by the Pacific Ocean and the states of Jalisco and Michoacán.

Colima's territory includes the Revillagigedo Islands—Socorro, San Benedicto, Clarión, and Roca Partida. These are under federal jurisdiction but are considered part of the municipality of Manzanillo.

Politically, the state is divided into ten municipalities. Natural geography divides the state into a northern and southern region. The north has a cooler climate due to the higher mountains. The south is hotter and includes the Pacific Ocean coastline. The Revillagigedo Islands, of volcanic origin, are dispersed along the 19° north parallel over an area of about 400 km^{2}—with a total landmass of 205 km^{2}.

The altitude varies from sea level to 3,839 m (12,595 ft) at the crater of the Volcán de Colima.

The state is in an offshoot of the Sierra Madre Occidental mountain range and geographically consists of four mountain systems. The most important of these is the Cerro Grande and its related peaks of Jurípicho-Juluapan, Los Juanillos, La Astilla, El Ocote, El Peón, El Barrigón, San Diego, and La Media Luna. The second consists of mountain chains parallel to the coast between the Marabasco and Armería Rivers, which include El Espinazo del Diablo, El Escorpión, El Tigre, El Aguacate, El Centinela, El Tora and La Vaca. The third is located between the Armería and Salado Rivers and includes the Alcomún y Partida, San Miguel y Comala and San Gabriel/Callejones peaks. The last is between the Salado and Naranjo or Coahuayana Rivers and contains small mountain chains such as the Piscila, Volcancillos, La Palmera, El Camichín and Copales. Three quarters of the state is covered by mountains and hills.

At the very north of the state, the border is marked by two volcanoes. The Colima Volcano, also called the Volcán de Fuego, is active and the Nevado de Colima is not. The Nevado de Colima is taller at 4,271 m (14,013 ft) and gives its name to the national park that surrounds it. The Colima Volcano, 3825 m (12,549 ft), has a pyramidal peak, in contrast to the other, which has been leveled somewhat. The last major eruptions of the Colima Volcano occurred in 1998 and 1999.

The main rivers of the state are the Cihuatlán River, also called the Chacala, Marabasco, or Paticajo, which forms the state's border with Jalisco on the west; the Armería, which descends from the Sierra de Cacoma and crosses the state north–south into the Pacific, and the Coahuayana River, which forms Colima's eastern border with Michoacán. The Salado is another important river, which flows entirely within Colima before emptying into the Coahuayana. Many of the state's streams and arroyos empty into the Salado.

Colima has a relatively short coastline, at 139 km (1.2% of Mexico's total). It extends from the Boca de Apiza to the Cerro de San Francisco in front of Barra de Navidad, Jalisco.

Coastal lagoons include the Potrero Grande in Manzanillo along with the Miramar and the San Pedrito. On the Tecomán municipality coast there are the lagoons of Alcuzahua and Amela, with the Cuyutlán lagoon split between the municipalities of Armería and Manzanillo. Inland, there are various fresh water lakes, with the larger ones near the coast and smaller ones in the Valley of Colima. The valley lakes are fed by the runoff from the Colima Volcano and include the Carrizalillo, Las Cuatas, El Jabalí, El Calaboso, La María and La Escondida.

The predominant climate is hot and relatively moist, with the coast particularly moist. One exception is the Tecomán municipality where the climate is dry and very hot. The mildest climates are in the municipalities of Comala and Cuauhtémoc. On the coast, the average temperature varies between 24 and 26 °C and inland, at the highest elevations, the temperature averages between 20 and 22 °C.

Cropland covers 27% of the state's territory, with another 28% dedicated to pasture. Forest covers 35% with the rest composed of bodies of water and urban areas. Most wild vegetation in the west of the state consists of moderately deciduous rainforest of medium height. Plants that lose leaves do so in the dry season. These include commercially important trees such as red cedar, caobilla (Couratara guianensis), parota (Enterolobium cyclocarpum)—and trees locally known as primavera, rosa morada, habillo, payolo, pelillo, barsino, and salatón. From the west of Manzanillo and into the municipalities of Armería and Coquimatlán, there is rainforest of medium height with tree species such as copal (Bursera) and cuajilote (Parmentiera aculeatea), with some pines, oaks, and salt friendly mangrove forests and scrub.

There is great diversity of wildlife species although a number of mammal species, such as ocelots, pumas, wild boar and deer, are disappearing. Among the state's rodents is the Magdalena rat (Xenomys nelsoni), a small rare animal little known outside Colima. Bird species include wild turkeys, although these have mostly disappeared, and a bird called the chachalaca. A number of ducks and other migratory birds pass through. Reptiles include crocodiles, with a nursery in Tecomán dedicated to their survival. It is also one of three Mexican states where the tarantula species Brachypelma hamorii is found, the other two being Michoacán and Jalisco.

== Demographics ==
Largest cities or towns in Colima Source:
Rank		Municipality	Pop.
1	Manzanillo	Manzanillo	159,853
2	Ciudad de Villa de Álvarez	Villa de Álvarez	147,496
3	Colima	Colima	146,965
4	Tecomán	Tecomán	88,337
5	Ciudad de Armería	Armería	15,368
6	Coquimatlán	Coquimatlán	14,892
7	Quesería	Cuauhtémoc	9,931
8	Cuauhtémoc	Cuauhtémoc	9,746
9	El Colomo	Manzanillo	9,664
10	Comala	Comala	9,649

Religion in Colima (2010 census)
Roman Catholicism	87.9%
Other Christian	6.9%
Other Religion	0.1%
No religion	3.2%
Unspecified	1.9%

Historical population
Year	Pop.	±%
1895	55,718	—
1900	65,115	+16.9%
1910	77,704	+19.3%
1921	91,749	+18.1%
1930	61,923	−32.5%
1940	78,806	+27.3%
1950	112,321	+42.5%
1960	164,450	+46.4%
1970	241,153	+46.6%
1980	346,293	+43.6%
1990	428,510	+23.7%
1995	488,028	+13.9%
2000	542,627	+11.2%
2005	567,996	+4.7%
2010	650,555	+14.5%
2015	711,235	+9.3%
2020	731,391	+2.8%

In the latter part of the 20th century, Colima had a very high population growth, expanding from 112,321 in 1950 to 567,996 in 2005. This growth was slowed by family planning programs. Despite this population growth, the state still ranks last of Mexico's federal entities, with a total of 650,555 according to the 2010 census, only 0.6% of the country's total. By 1980, the majority of the state's population was living in urban centers. Today, 89% live in urban areas, above the national average of 78%. These urban populations are concentrated in the municipalities of Colima, Manzanillo, Tecomán and Villa de Alvarez.

The majority of the population is mestizo (mixed indigenous and Spanish). As of 2005, some 2,880 people were counted with the ability to speak an indigenous language. This is about 7 out of 1,000 people, slightly higher than the nation's average of 6 per 1,000 people. There are ethnic Nahua and Otomi communities in Zacualpan and Suchitlán in the municipality of Comala, in Juluapan and Pueblo Nuevo in the municipality of Villa de Alvarez and in Las Pesadas in the municipality of Minatitlán. According to the 2020 Census, 1.86% of Colima's population identified as Black, Afro-Mexican, or of African descent. Over 95% of the state's population is Catholic with small communities of other Christian groups making up the rest.

== Principal communities ==
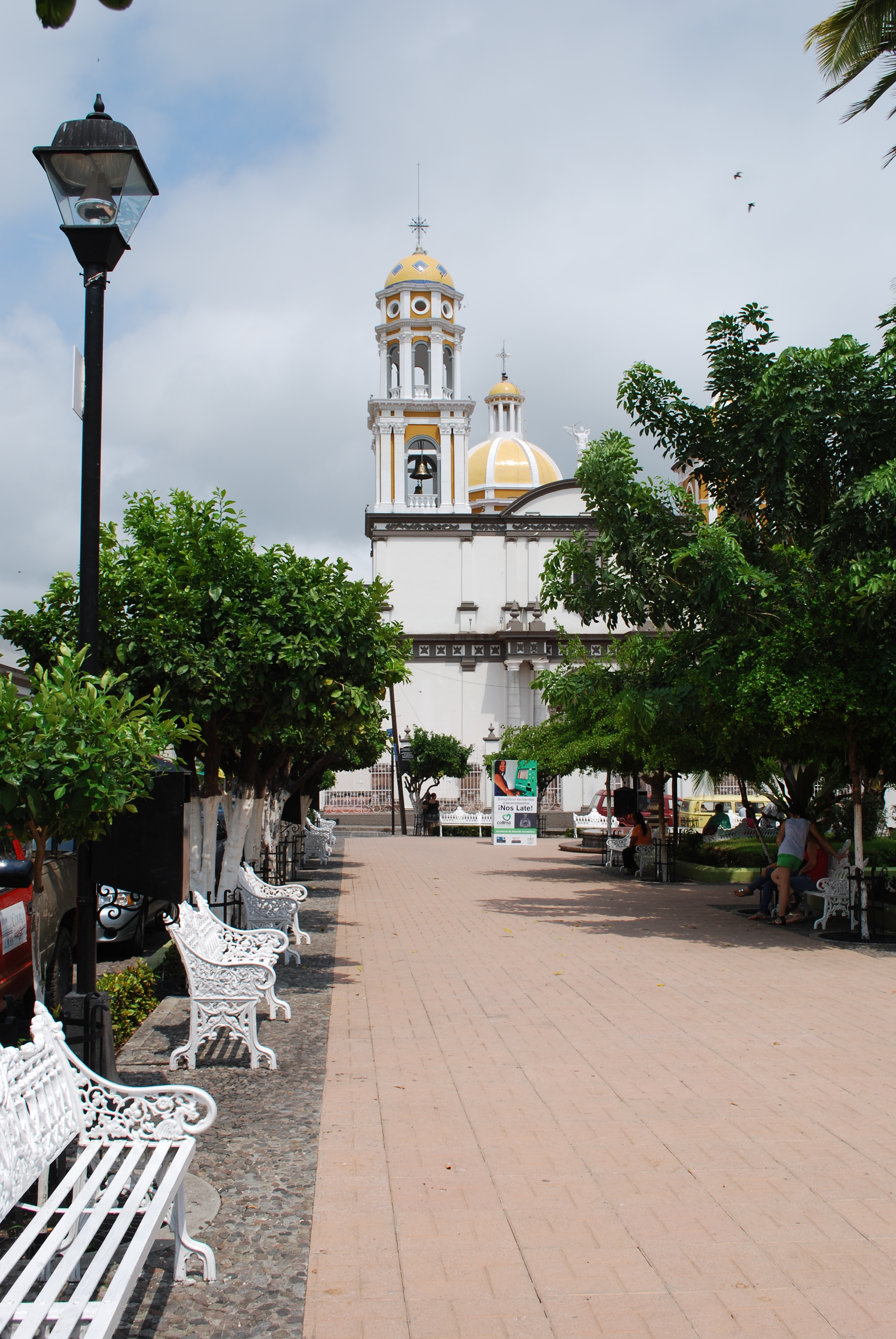
Plaza and church in Comala

The city of Colima is the capital and gives the state its name. It is located in the north central part of the state, just south of the foothills of the Colima Volcano in the Valley of Colima. The city began as a Spanish settlement that was originally established further south in 1523 but moved to the current location in 1527. The capital remains the state's economic, political and cultural center.

Villa de Álvarez is part of the city of Colima's metropolitan area. It maintains a distinct identity, with a combination of bullfighting and charreada event that is one of the oldest of its kind in northwestern Mexico, which takes part in La Petatera, a bullring that is assembled each year for the event, made of logs and petates, and that is known as one of the world's largest crafts. It is also known for late evening meals called cenadurias that typically feature sopes, enchiladas, tostadas, pozole, atole, and tamales.

The city of Los Martínez began at the end of the 18th century, established by someone known only by his last name of Martínez. In 1818, a strong earthquake sent many from nearby San Francisco to the area, and it was renamed San Francisco de Almoloyan. It was recognized as a town in 1860, with the name of Villa de Álvarez in honor of the first governor of the state. It was designated a city in 1991.

Manzanillo is the state's primary port and tourist destination. It is on the Pacific coast, less than two hours' drive from the capital. Manzanillo is mostly popular with regional tourists and sports fishermen, but there have been efforts to broaden its appeal. The city is one of Mexico's most important Pacific ports, handling regional merchandise and acting as an overflow port for other ports from Mexico to Los Angeles. Most of the state's recent economic development has been related to this port.

Coquimatlán comes from a Nahuatl phrase meaning "land of networks" referring to the interconnected ravines in the area. It was founded in the very early colonial period and still maintains its narrow streets and old houses with large main doors of wood and balconies with simple ironwork. Tecomán is located in what has been an agricultural valley since the colonial era, today best known for its production of limes. The town is marked by an abstract sculpture depicting a lime tree created by sculptor Sebastián, which measures thirty meters in height and weighs 110 tons. In addition to being the main lime producer, the Tecoman Valley also produces cocoa, cotton, coconuts, mangos, papaya, avocados and melons.

== Economy ==
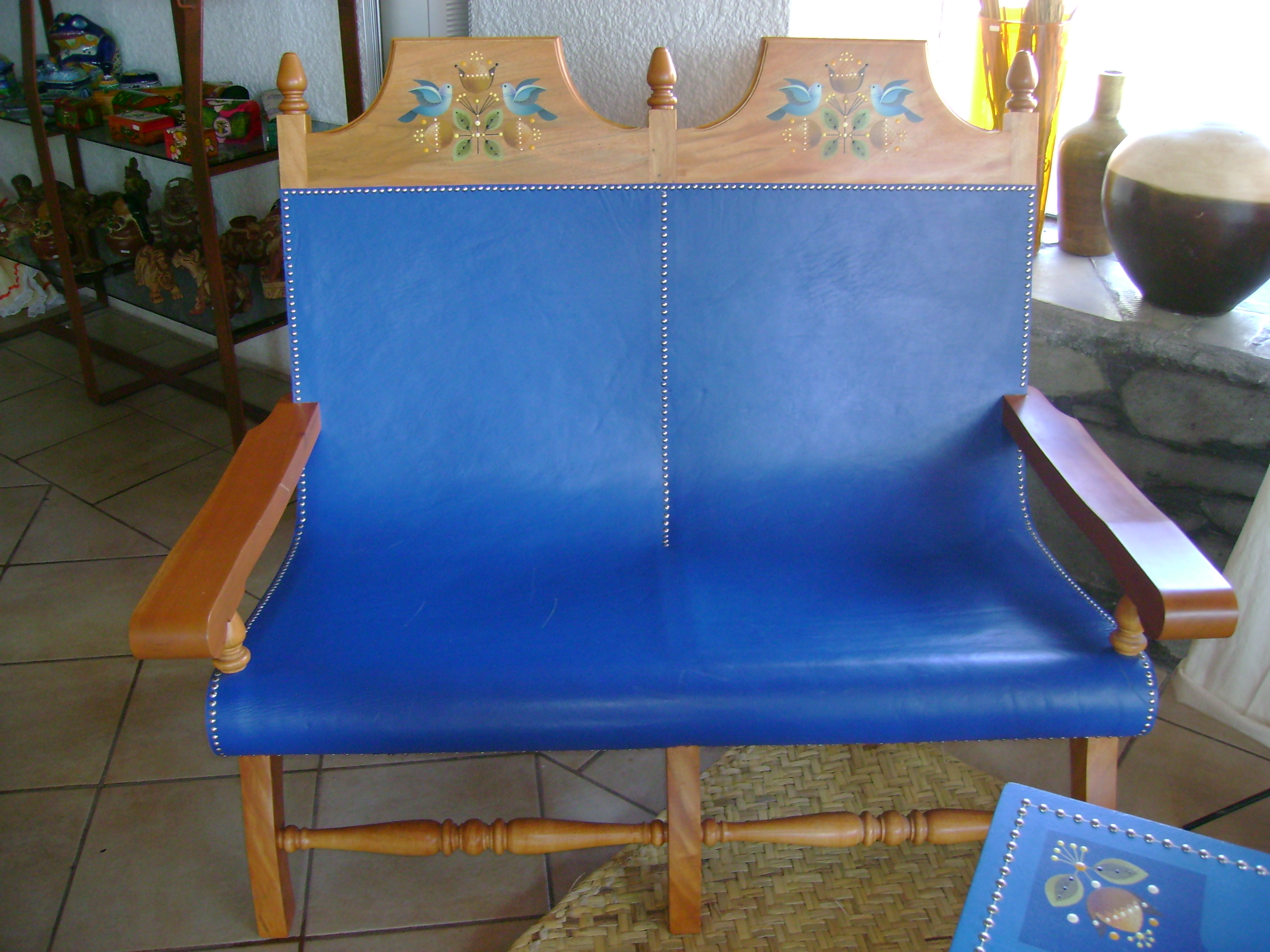
Example of Rangeliano style furniture

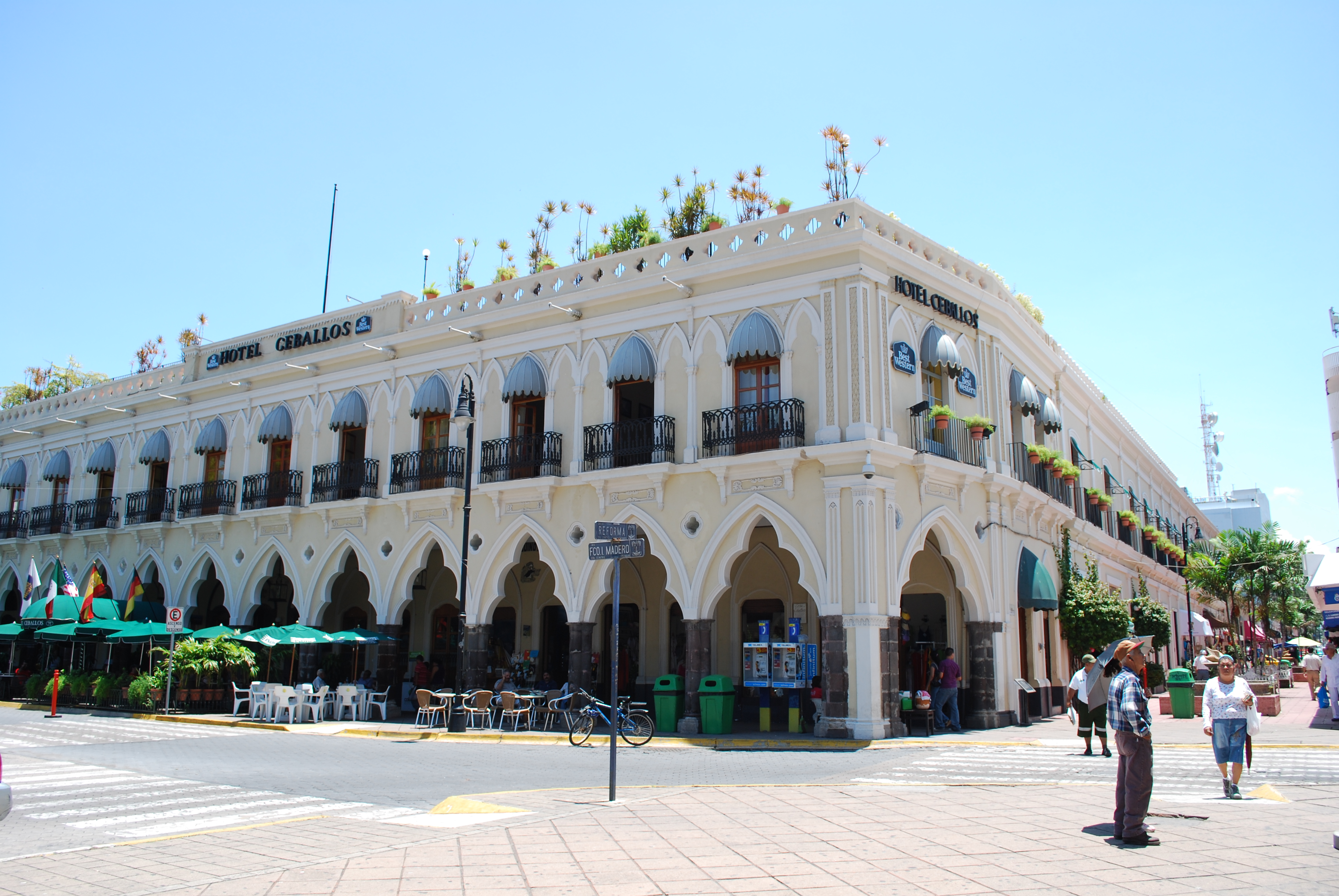
Colima Historical Center

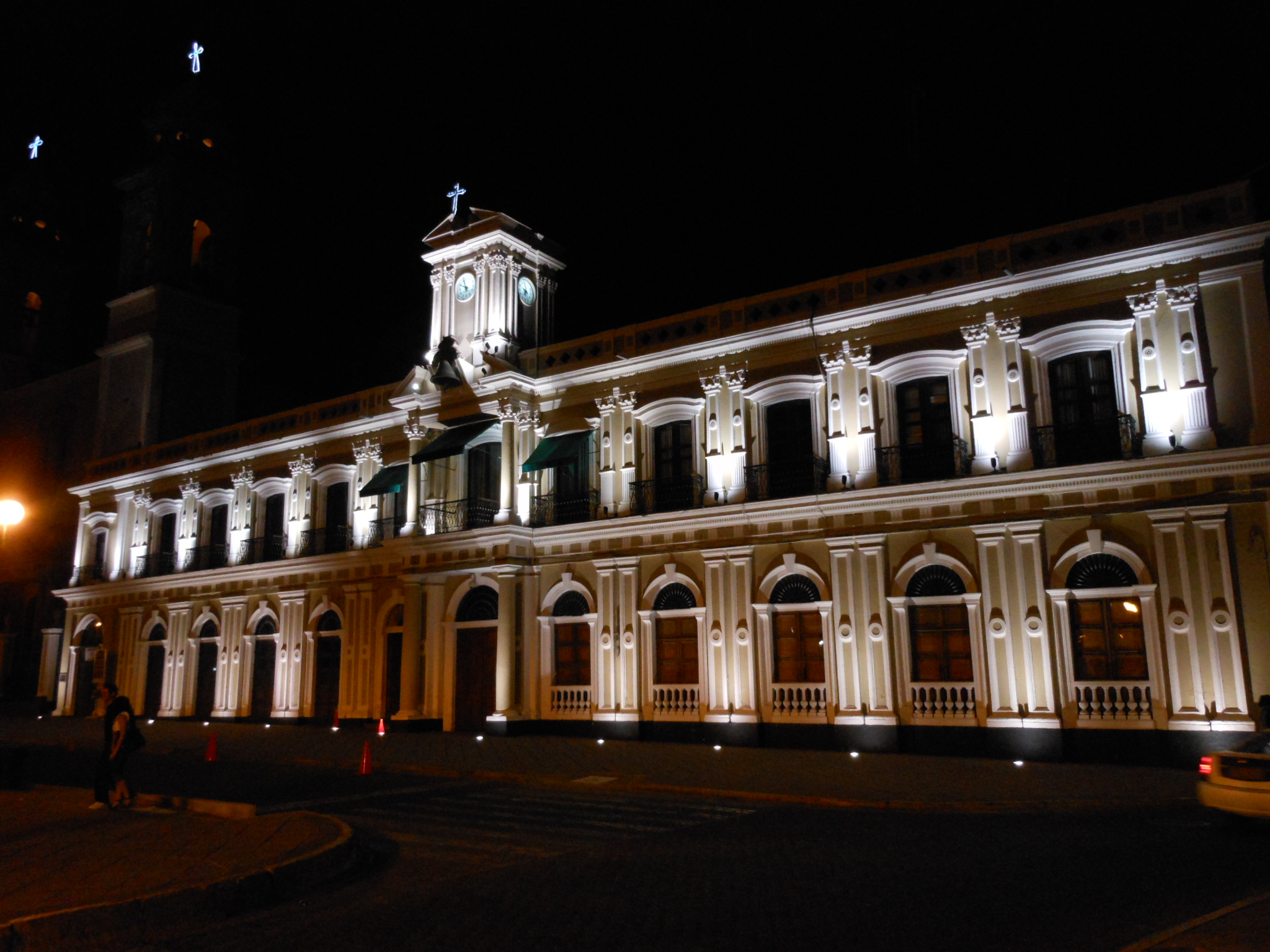
Government Palace

The state has a high level of socioeconomic development, with one of the highest standards of living in Mexico and lowest unemployment. In the state, 96% have running water, 82% have sewerage and 98% have electricity. The 2009 GDP of the state was 43,370,725,000 pesos. Due to its small size and population, this is only 0.5% of Mexico's total GDP. Most population and employment growth has been in the main urban areas of the state such as Colima, Villa de Alvarez, Manzanillo and Tecomán. According to INEGI (2010), 24.1% are employed in services, 20.4% in commerce, restaurants and hotels, 15.9% in transportation, storage and communications, 11.1% in finance, insurance and real estate, 9.5% in electricity, gas and water services, 5.7% in manufacturing, 5.1% in construction, 4.9% in agriculture and livestock and 3.8% in mining.

Agriculture, forestry and fishing employ 1.2% of the state's population and contribute 8.45% to its GDP. Colima produces about half of Mexico's lime crop, and is second in the production of coconut meat and tuna . The principal markets for Colima's agricultural products—especially produce—are Guadalajara, Mexico City, Puebla and Monterrey. During the dry season, there is migration from the rural areas into the urban ones as most agricultural work takes place during the rainy season. Most farm work consists of the harvesting of fruit. The agricultural production supports an agro-industry that attracts workers from neighboring Jalisco and Michoacán. Most of Colima's agriculture is based on perennial plants, such as fruit trees, producing limes, coconuts, mangos and bananas, accounting for ninety percent of the volume of agricultural production and 79% of its value. Colima is the primary producer of limes in Mexico. Other important crops include corn, rice, melons, sorghum, chili peppers, coffee, tomatoes and tomatillos.

By volume the most important livestock is that of cattle, followed by domestic fowl, then honey and beeswax. Most livestock production is in the north of the state due to climate, and also includes pigs, goats and sheep. Commercially productive forest stands at about 108,225 hectares with about sixty percent of the trees salable. These forests are mostly rainforest, with some areas of holm oak. Lumber harvesting has decreased in the state owing to conservation measures.

Fishing is concentrated on the coastline in ocean waters of about 641 km^{2} as well as in 8,350 hectares of lagoons and 2,032 inland bodies of waters. There are also about 3,000 hectares dedicated to fish farming. Fish production has increased considerably since the 1980s. This is mostly due to more intensive ocean activities, but fish production from rivers and lakes has also grown, at about twelve percent.

Principal catches include tuna and squid, in which Colima ranks nationally at third and fourth place respectively. Other commercial species include huachinangos, red porgy, combers, wahoo, and mojarra. Fish farming mostly concerns raising shrimp along lakes and lagoons, such as Cuyutlán, Chupadero, and Potrero Grande, with an annual production of about 5,000 tons. Some oyster raising takes place as well.

The fishing industry in the state supports a canning industry mostly for tuna, shrimp and octopus along with the freezing of fish filets.

Mining, construction, and utilities employ 18.5% of the population and generate 27.53% of the GDP. Half of this is from production of electricity, gas, and water services. Mining is next in importance, with production of iron, mostly from the Peña Colorada, the largest deposit in the country. Manufacturing contributes 4.7% of the state's GDP with 2,007 units of production. Most facilities produce beverages, metal structures, canned foods, cereals, furniture, printed materials, building supplies and dairy products.

Handcrafts in the state are mostly produced for local needs rather than the tourist market. One distinguished craft is the making of palm frond hats, including a local style called the "colimote". Ixtlahuacán is noted for its production of hammocks. Other items include huarache sandals, boots, bird cages, cold cuts and costumes and masks for traditional dance. These costumes include "Indian" dresses decorated with cross stitch. The state is also known for the production of handcrafted furniture, especially those based on the designs of Alejandro Rangel Hidalgo, from Comala. Villa de Álvarez produces decorative objects in fine wood. Suchitlán in the municipality of Comala is distinguished by its production of masks and other accessories for festivals and ceremonies. Villages on the sides of the Cerro Grande are the principal producers of baskets made from reeds and palm fronds. Santiago in the municipality of Manzanillo is noted for crafts made of seashell and snail shells. The main craft in the city of Colima is the reproduction of archeological pieces, especially ceramics of the old red-burnished (rojo-bruñido) style.

About two thirds of the state's GDP is from commerce and services which include transportation and storage, mostly linked with the Manzanillo port. Economic growth associated with the port continues to grow by double digits. Most commercial activity in general is concentrated in the cities of Colima, Tecomán and Manzanillo, which have the most developed communications, transportation and other infrastructure. The main distribution center is the city of Colima handling both basic commodities and industrial and other commercial merchandise for the rest of the state. Just under 95% of Colima's commercial enterprises are retail outlets with 5.6% involved in wholesale. Only three percent of these enterprises are modern facilities with twenty-one traditional markets, forty-five major tianguis and numerous corner stores still dominating the state. Commercial sales increase by about five percent per year.

Much of the state's tourism centers on its beaches in Manzanillo, and in the municipalities of Armería and Tecomán. Manzanillo is the most popular in the state, and a major tourism destination for Mexico's Pacific coast. For this reason, it has developed infrastructure with hotels, restaurants, golf courses, and other attractions. For Holy Week 2011, one of Mexico's busiest vacation times, the state gained 175 million pesos and had a hotel occupancy of 94%, 7% higher than the previous year. 70,249 visited during that period. Most of the visitors were at the state's beaches with the busiest being Cuyutlán, El Real and Miramar.

== Tourist attractions ==
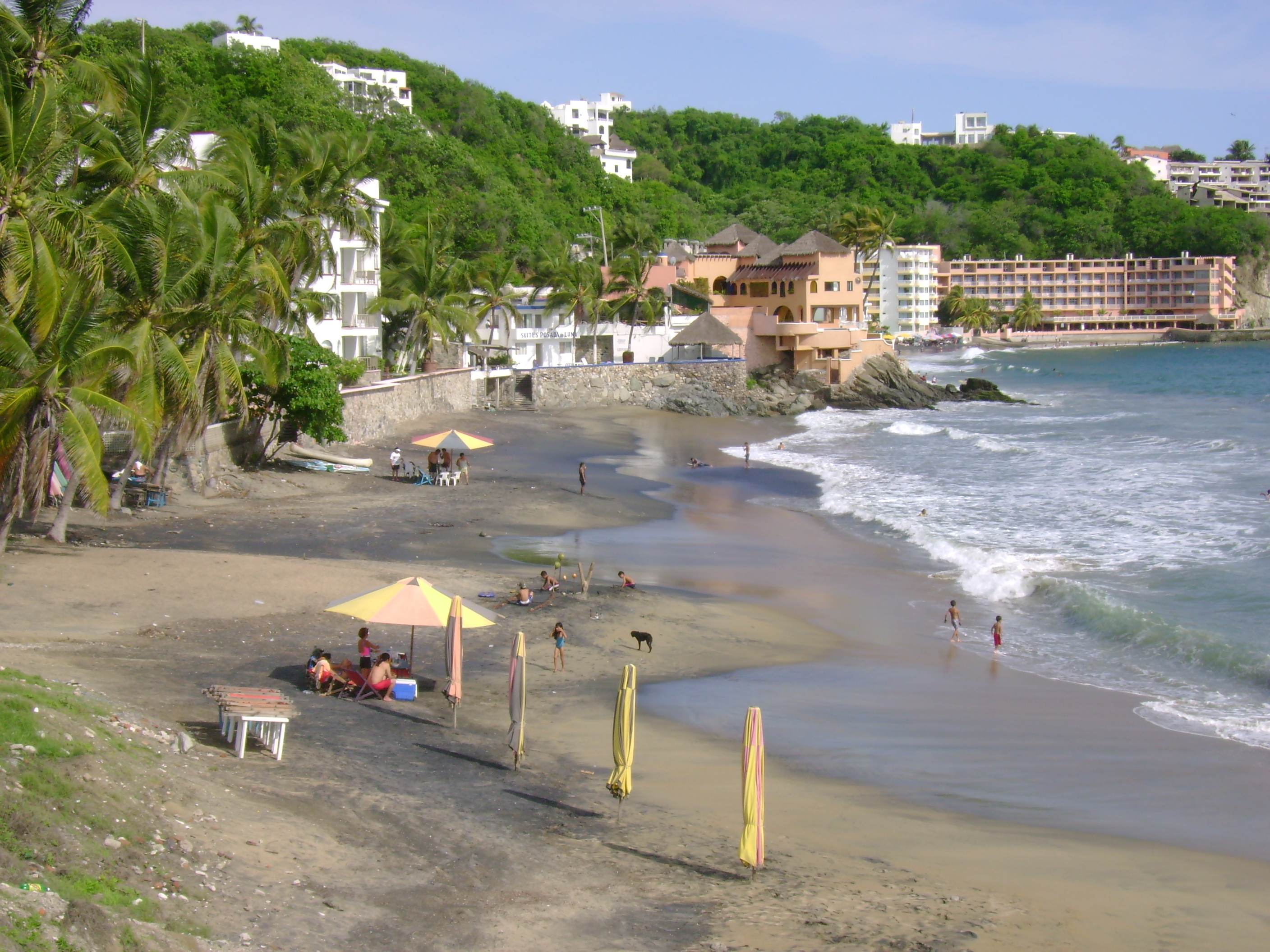
Santiago Beach in Manzanillo

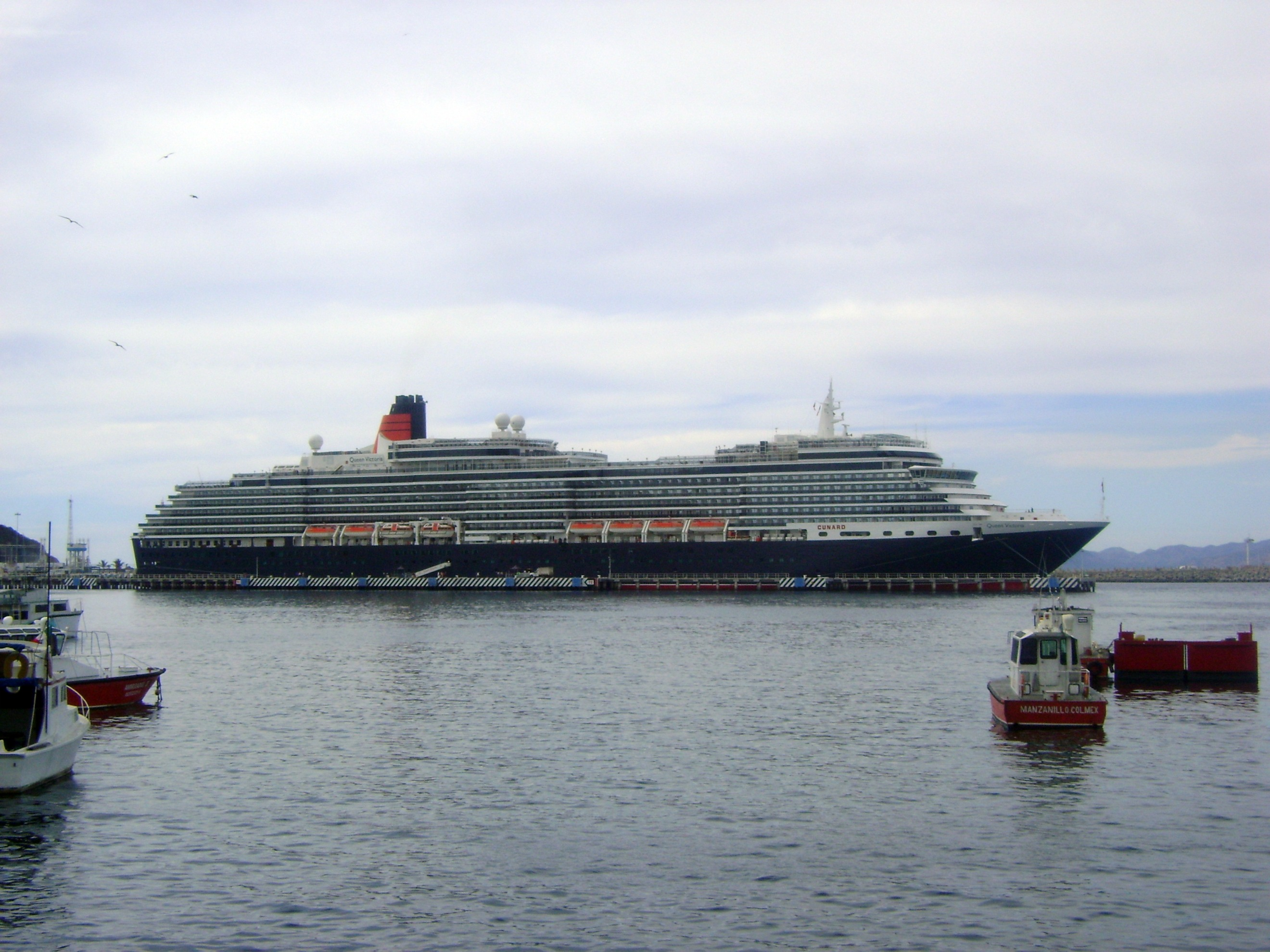
MS Queen Victoria in Manzanillo

Colima's most important tourism destination is the beaches of Manzanillo, which is popular among those in western Mexico as well as many sports fishermen. Historically, the port was the point of departure for various maritime expeditions and received the annual Manila Galleon from the Philippines. It has called itself the "World Capital of the Sailfish" since 1957 when 336 species were caught off its shores. The abundance of this fish along with marlin has made it a popular destination with sports fishermen and the city holds the annual Dorsey International fishing tournament. It is not as well known or as visited as other Pacific destinations such as Puerto Vallarta, despite long sandy beaches and docks for cruise ships. In the 2000s, the city worked to renovate its downtown, with all buildings now showing white facades and many with red tile roofs.

The second most important destination is the small town of Comala, a small traditional town near the capital of Colima. Comala was named a "Pueblo Mágico" in 2002 because of its natural surroundings and traditional architecture, which its downtown declared a historic monument. Since 1962, all the buildings in the town have been painted white and most have red tile roofs, giving it the nickname of "White Village of America."

Most of the other attractions of the state are related to its history, and most of these are in and around the capital city of Colima. The former state government palace is located in the center of the city of Colima and dates from the 19th century. The main stairwell contains a mural by Colima painter Jorge Chávez Carrillo. The Palacio Federal is near Jardín Núñez in the city of Colima and dates from the beginning of the 20th century. The upper floor contains murals with scenes depicting Mexico City and portraits of people from Mexico's history. The Archive of the History of the State is located at Jardín Juárez in the city of Colima. It dates from the early 20th century and was home to the Escuela de Artes Aplicadas. San Francisco de Almoloyan in the city of Colima is the ruins of an old Franciscan monastery from the 16th century. The Mesón de Caxitlán on the Colima Tecomán highway is the ruins of an old in on the former royal road from the 18th century.

Other important attractions include a number of former haciendas, many of which have been renovated. The Del Carmen hacienda is in the municipality of Villa de Álvarez. It was a cattle ranch from the 19th century, and has been restored. The San Antonio hacienda is in the municipality of Comala. It was a coffee plantation from the 19th century, with a chapel and aqueduct, which have all been restored. The former Nogueras hacienda in Comala has a main house that dates from the 19th century and a chapel from the 17th. It has been restored and is used primarily as a museum.

The United States Department of State considers the State of Colima so dangerous due to widespread crime that it has issued a "Do Not Travel" advisory to its citizens for the entire state.

== Culture ==
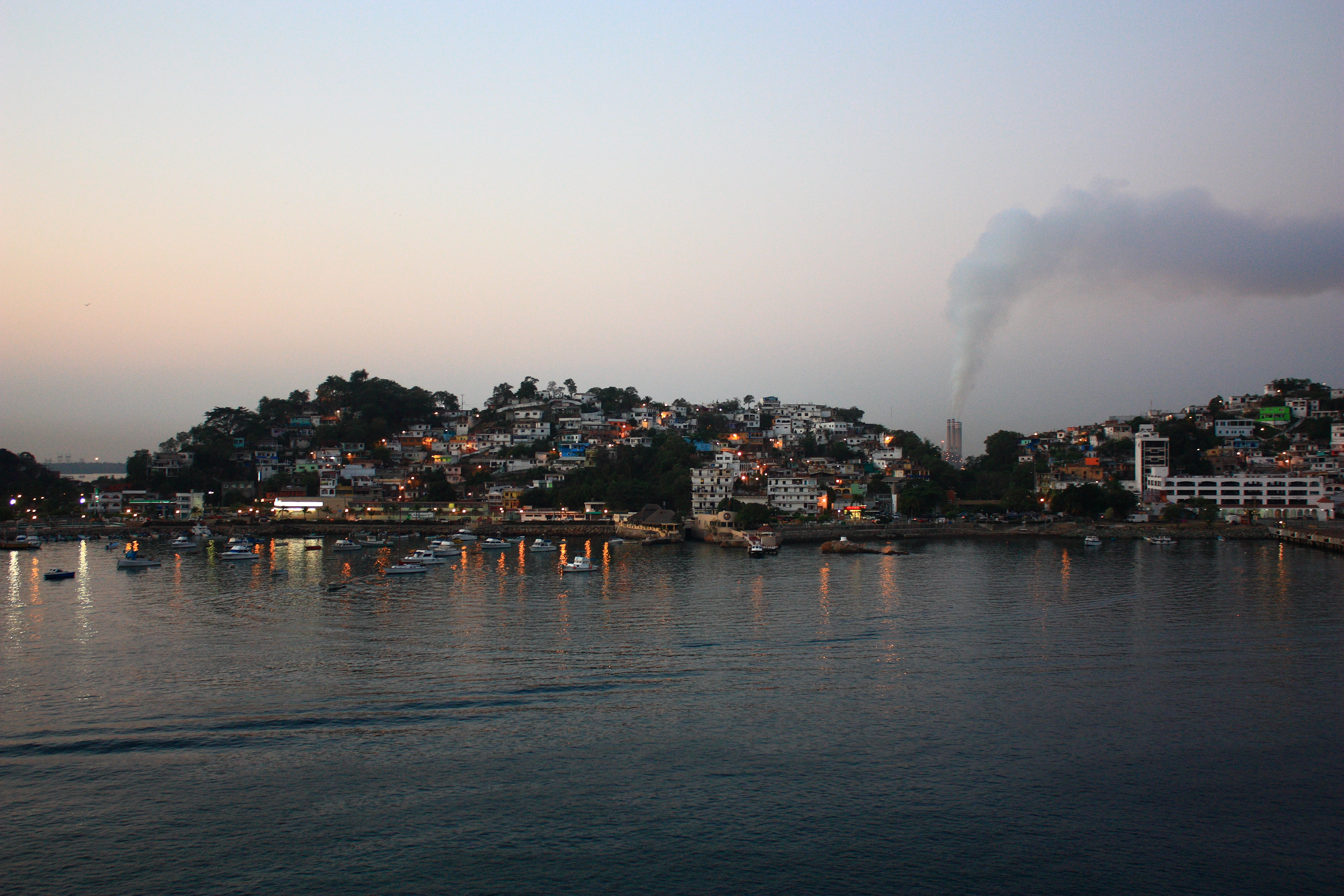
Manzanillo harbor

Indigenous and Spanish cultures have played a part in the shaping of the state, although traces can be hidden in modern local cultures and traditions. Most crafts and dances of the state are of indigenous origin although some originated after the Conquest. The Spanish contributed to bullfighting and charreada.

The most popular folk dances in the state include some that tell the story of the Spanish conquest—under various names, such as Conquista, Virgin of Guadalupe, capotes, and the fox. Another popular dance is called Apaches. These originated in the colonial period, along with Moros y Cristianos and machines. Dances with indigenous roots include sonajera India and morenos.

Pastorales, or short plays with religious themes, are traditions that began in the very early colonial period. A popular one from that time is the Adoration of the Three Wise Men, though it has evolved to meet modern tastes.

Through cultural transmission with Filipinos on the Manila-Acapulco galleon trade, the Colimense have a special coconut beverage called the tuba compuesta often flavoured with pomegranate or beet juice.

=== Festivals ===
Colima has a number of important local festivals and other annual events. January 6 is the Los Chayacates de Ixtlahuacán—a mix of indigenous and Catholic practices based on the pastorale and the cultivation cycle of corn. On the Tuesday after Epiphany is the "Entrance of the Señor de la Expiración" in Rancho de Villa. On this date, the image returns to this village from Coquimatlán. It includes parades, dances, fireworks, and jaripeos. Candlemas is an important event in Tecomán with traditional dances and fairs. Candlemas in Suchitlán is the most important annual event in the region, celebrated with dances such as Los Gallitos, Los Apaches and Los Morenos. The last two dances involved dancers with elaborately carved and decorated masks.

Villa de Álvarez celebrates its annual Fiestas Charro-Taurinas, originally the feast of the city's patron saint, Philip of Jesus. In addition to bullfights and charreadas, mojigangas are featured. The Paspaques of Suchitlán—an agricultural ritual of pre-Hispanic origin—is celebrated by the Nahuas of this small village on March 19. It centers on preparing corn in various ways, such as tortillas, tamales, pozole, and more. Holy Week is a major event in many municipalities, which often hold passion plays during the week.

The Feria de Manzanillo occurs from April 29 to May 1 and celebrates the anniversary of its designation as a major port (Puerto de Altura). It is held with street parties, dances, contests, and jaripeos. May 3 is the Day of the Holy Cross, important in Suchitlán, and celebrated with the morenos dance. The Fiestas del Cristo de Caña in Quesería in May revolves around an 18th-century Christ image that came to the area from Pátzcuaro. It is celebrated with horse races, mojigangas, traditional dance, processions, and music. On September 29 Tamala, the municipality of Ixtlahuacán celebrates the feast of the Archangel Michael with a change of "mayordomos" (festival sponsors).

The most important festival in the state is Day of the Dead. For the weeks before and after, the state holds its Agricultural, Industrial, and Cultural Fair. On November 1, the city of Colima has an agricultural, livestock, commerce, and industry fair that includes dances, parades with floats and a charreada. Pastorelas are most commonly seen during December between the feast day of the Virgin of Guadalupe (December 12) and Christmas. Comala celebrates the feast of the Virgin of Guadalupe from the first to the December 12 with processions, bullfights, jaripeos, cockfights—and on the eighth with a dance to popular music, floats, and fireworks.

The state has produced one internationally famous artist named Alejandro Rangel Hidalgo. He is best known for illustrating Christmas cards for UNICEF in the 1960s, but he did much other work and designed furniture in a style now called Rangeliano. Many of his works are preserved at his former home of the Nogueras Hacienda in Comala, which is now a museum and cultural center run by the University of Colima. Other noted artists from the state include Gabriel Portillo, Mercedes Zamora, Jorge Chávez Carrillo, Pancha Magaña and Juan Soriano. Noted writers include Gregorio Torres Quintero, Fray Juan de Grijalva, Balbino Dávalos and Felipe Sevilla.

== Communications and transportation ==
=== Transport ===
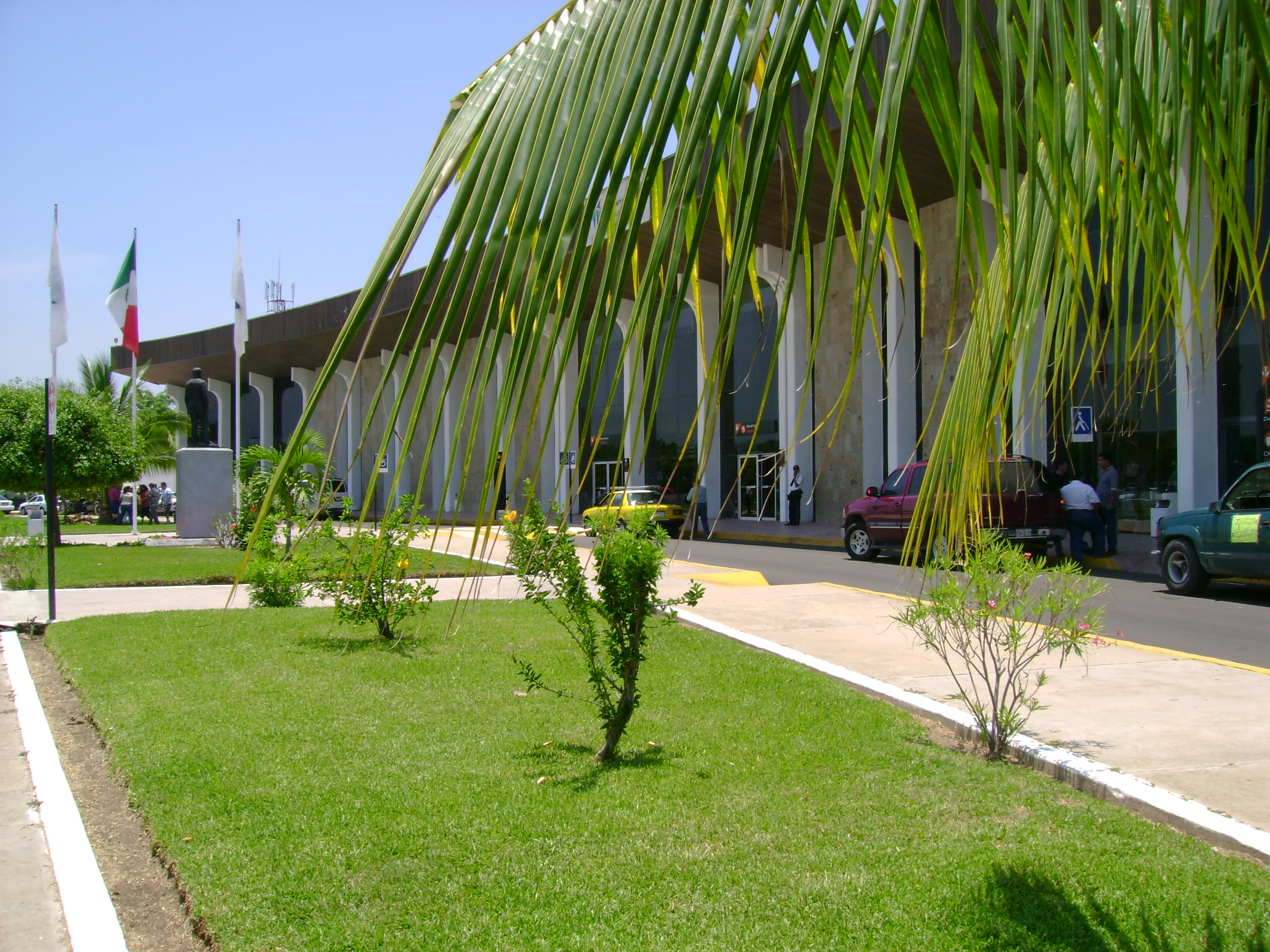
Playa de Oro airport in Manzanillo

The most important transportation hub in the state is the port of Manzanillo, handling 91.3% of the shipping of the state and the immediate region. It also operates as an overflow port for the commercial and industrial zones of western Mexico, the Bajío area and the center of Mexico, but handles overflow from as far as Los Angeles. Most of the merchandise that passes through here is part of the trade between Mexico and Asia. The port infrastructure consists of two types of installations. One is artificial, located in the interior port of San Pedrito and the other located in the bay proper. The artificial structure is a tall dock with a length of 450 meters and 225 meters wide for a surface of 10,125m2. The Manzanillo port has a dock for cruise ships, and an average of 58 ships visit per year. Nearby are two large private marinas, one in Las Hadas and the other at Isla Navidad. The port area is not fully developed, with over 130 hectares reserved for expansion.

The two main airports are the Playa de Oro International Airport in Manzanillo and the Lic. Miguel de la Madrid Airport in Colima. Playa de Oro has flights to and from destinations in Mexico, the United States and Canada. The Miguel de la Madrid airport was opened in 1987, twenty-two km outside the capital. It extends over 386 hectares with runways that cover 16,200m2. The longest runway is 2.3 km long. It has one terminal. Most of the Colima airport flights go to Mexico City, with about 100,000 passengers going through the terminal in 2009.

The state has 1,424.5 km of roadway with 686.9 km paved with asphalt and the rest stone or dirt road. The main highway out of the state connects the city of Colima and Guadalajara. The second most important connects Manzanillo with Guadalajara. This roadway has broken Mexican records in the dimensions of its bridges. There are 191.5 km of railway with fifteen active stations.

=== Media ===
There are eight AM radio stations operating in the state and five FM stations. Most are in Colima and Manzanillo. There is no local television station with programming coming from Mexico City and through cable. Telephone service covers the entire state but rural areas still use analog. There are still some telegraph centers. The state has fourteen newspapers mostly in the city of Colima and Manzanillo, including: Correo de Manzanillo, Diario de Colima, and Ecos de la Costa.

== History ==
=== Name and seal ===
The formal name of the state is "Estado Libre y Soberano de Colima" (Free and Sovereign State of Colima). The state is named after the capital city of Colima. This name is most likely derived from a Nahuatl phrase "coliman", but the original meaning is in doubt with two most accepted versions. One interpretation means "place in the hand of the grandfather" with "grandfather" possibly referring to the volcano. The other interpretation is "place in the hands of the ancestors". A third interpretation is based on an interpretation of Colima's glyph as it appears in the Nomina and Mendocino codices, which has a bent arm with the hand turned and water on the shoulder. This glyph is still used in the state's seal. This interpretation would then be "place where the waters bend".

=== Pre-Hispanic period ===
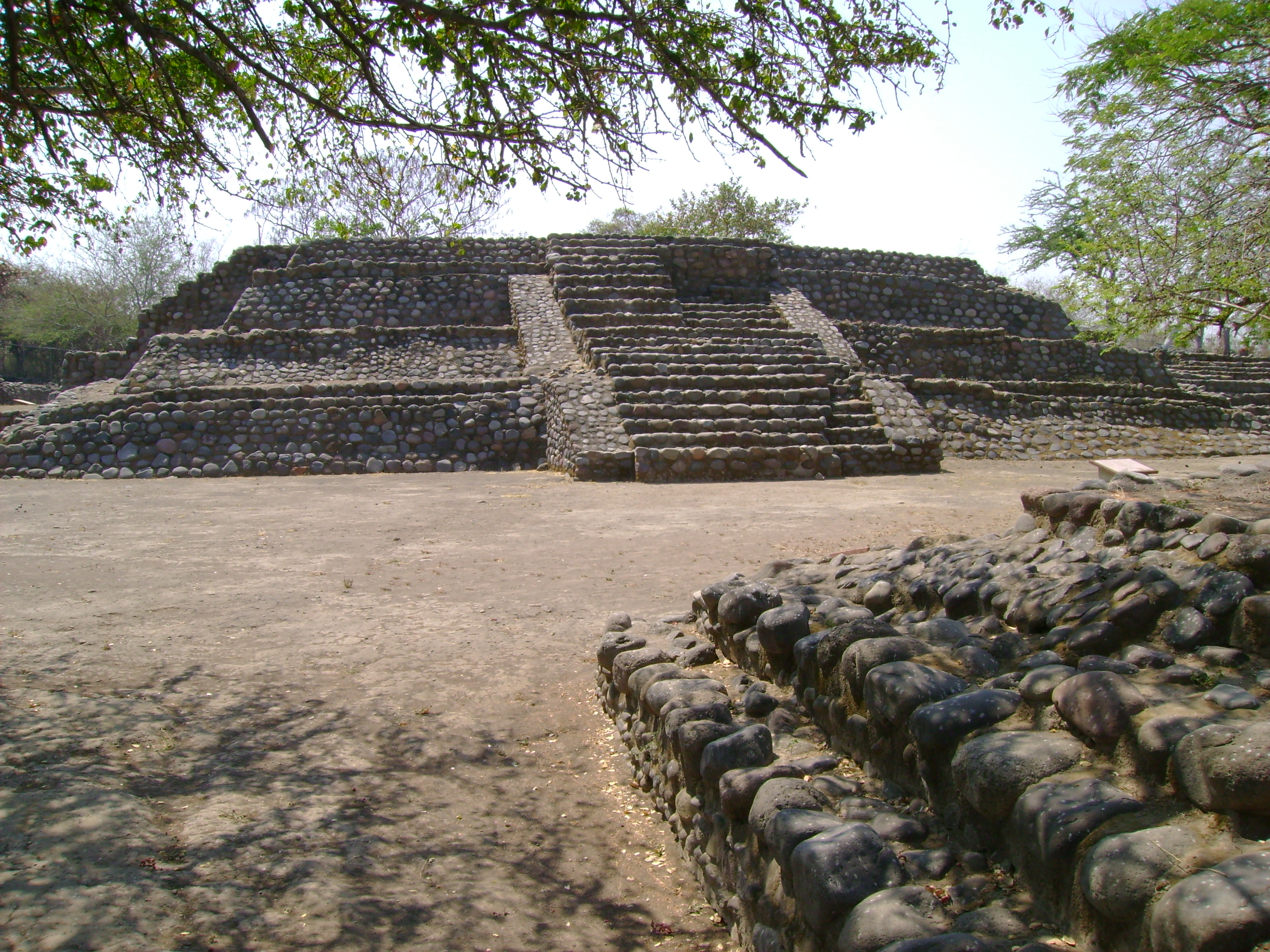
Pyramid in La Campana

The state was home to a number of pre-Hispanic cultures as part of Western Mexico. Archeological evidence dates human occupation of the area as far back as 1500 BCE, with sites here contemporary with San Lorenzo on the Gulf Coast and Tlatilco in the Valley of Mexico. One period of the area's development is called the Los Ortices era, which began around 500 BCE. During this time the elements that characterize the pre-Hispanic peoples of Colima appear, including shaft tombs and a distinctive ceramic style called rojo bruñido, or burnished red.

The next phase, called Comala and centered on a site of the same name, was from around 100 to 600 CE. Comala people perfected burnished red pottery and created representations of people and animals with skill and fluid lines. The best known of these figures are known as the fattened dogs. The Comala site shows influence from Teotihuacan. Around 500 CE, another site in Armería developed along the river of the same name.

The Chanal site was active from the 6th to the 15th centuries and was the main culture for the Colima area. Belonging to this culture was a number of smaller sites and most of the ones known and explored to date. After Chanal the largest related site is La Campana but most contain pyramidal bases and plazas with structures often containing rounded edges. Images of Huehueteotl and Tlaloc appear with this culture, which may indicate the origins of the cultures that ultimately settled central Mexico.

There is one other site called Periquillo, which indicates one late migration into Colima around the 10th century from the north.

At the beginning of the 16th century, the Purépechas invaded the territory of the Tecos and got as far as the salt fields of Tzacoalco. A chief named Colimotl or Colliman defeated the P'urhépechas during the Saltpeter War (1480-1510) (Guerra del Salitre). After this, the Tecos conquered Sayula, Zapotlán and Amunla, making them the dominant cultural group in this part of the state. Both the Periquillo and Chanal sites were occupied when the Spanish arrived in the 16th century.

=== Colonial era ===
After conquering the Aztecs and the Purépecha, the Spanish made incursions into Colima. The first incursion into the Colima area occurred under Juan Rodríguez de Villafuerte in 1522 but was defeated by the natives of the Tecomán Valley. Hernán Cortés then sent Gonzalo de Sandoval to defeat the Tecos, which he did at the Paso de Alima and the Palenque de Tecomán. Sandoval then established the first Spanish settlement in the Colima Valley called Caxitlán in 1523, making it the third oldest functioning city government in Mexico and the second municipality of western New Spain. In 1527, Francisco Cortés de San Buenaventura moved the Spanish settlement to its current located and changing the name to San Sebastián de Colima.

Revillagigedo Archipelago was brought to colonial attention in 1533 by Hernando de Grijalva. The state's first port at Tzalahua would be an important site for about 300 years of Spanish colonial rule as a line of defense and a commercial center.

After the Conquest, the native population was reduced drastically. Some estimations state that the population declines from 150,000 in 1523 to 15,000 in 1554, rebounding somewhat in the 17th century. This population reduction led to the introduction of African slaves and indigenous people from neighboring regions.

Evangelization was carried out by the Franciscans who established the San Francisco de Coliman monastery in 1554 then the Almoloyan monastery. They would be followed by the Mercedarians and the Brothers of Saint John of the Cross. It was originally made part of the diocese of Valladolid (Morelia).

The port of Manzanillo, then called Santiago de Buena Esperanza, played a large part in the expeditions northwards ordered by Hernán Cortés, which later led to the European discovery of Las Californias — the Baja California Peninsula and Alta California. Cortés de San Buenaventura set out to conquer towards the north, covering the rest of the state and into what is now southern Sinaloa. Later the port would be a target for pirates as the Manila galleons would unload materials from the Spanish East Indies here. These pirates would include Francis Drake and Thomas Cavendish. The last major battle against pirates at Manzanillo was in 1615 with Captain Sebastián Vizcaino defending the port against Dutch pirate Joris van Speilbergen.

Colima lost territory during the colonial period to 1822, and further into the 19th century. With the creation of Nueva Galicia in 1531, it lost its territories north of the Cihuatlán or Marabasco River and the region south of Lake Chapala. In 1550, Colima lost the provinces of Autlán and Amula. By the end of the 16th century, it lost the Motines region, now part of Michoacán and in the 19th century the Xilotlán region to Jalisco.

From the early colonial period, Colima was a province that answered to Mexico City. In 1789, the parish of Colima was incorporated into the diocese of Guadalajara. In 1796, Colima was converted into a sub delegation of the province of Guadalajara.

One colonial area industry in Colima was the production of "coconut wine" — an alcoholic beverage distilled from date palm fruit and coconut. One of the first introduced crops was cacao in the 16th century, with coconut, sugar cane, and cotton coming after. Other crops such as rice, indigo and vanilla would be introduced later.

=== Independence to the present ===
In the early 19th century, the commercial port of Manzanillo was opened to domestic and international traffic for a brief time. The first Colima newspaper called "El Observador de las Leyes" was published at this time as well.

With the outbreak of the Mexican War of Independence, authorities arrested the head of Indian communities along with suspected insurgents in October 1810. This was despite the fact that Nahua groups had organized to defend against the insurgents upon hearing that they were enemies of the king and planned to destroy churches. One accused insurgent was José Antonio Díaz, the parish priest of Almoloyán and friend of Miguel Hidalgo y Costilla. Later he would join the insurgent army. During the war, the city of Colima was taken by the insurgents Jose Antonio Torres at the end of 1810 without resistance and taken back by the royalist army in 1811. In 1811, royalist troops defeated the insurgents under José Calixto Martinez at the Battle of Los Llanos de Santa Juana. Insurgents took back the city in 1812 under the command of Ignacio Sandoval and Miguel Gallaga. In 1813, the city was in royalist hands with the city swearing allegiance to the monarchist constitution. In 1821 the Plan of Iguala for Mexican independence was proclaimed in the city, and accepted by local authorities. Immediately after Independence, Colima was still a subdelegation of Guadalajara. In 1821, Colima lost the Zapotlán areas along with the towns of Tecalitlán and Xilotlán, but gained the town of Tonila. This and earlier losses of territory would define the area's modern borders.

In 1824, with Mexico's first constitution, Colima was an independent territory. It integrated with Michoacán in 1837. In 1846, it became a separate territory again, and in 1856, was made a state with the triumph of the Liberals. Its status as a state was reaffirmed by the 1857 Mexican Constitution and General Manuel Alvarez was declared its first constitutional governor.

Colima served as a provisional seat for Benito Juárez's Liberal government in 1858 during the Reform War. In 1861, the Revillagigedo Islands were added to Colima's territory. French troops entered the city in 1864, dissolving the state congress, with Colima becoming a department in 1865. In 1867, Republican troops under Ramon Corona retook the city. Colima became a diocese independent of Guadalajara in 1881.

The latter part of the 19th century saw the introduction of industry with textile factories such as La Armonía, La Atrevida and San Cayetano. The telegraph arrived to the state in 1869 to connect the capital and the port of Manzanillo. Similarly, the telephone service was added in 1883. Railroad service between the two cities began in 1889 and a city tram was added to the capital in 1892.

During the Mexican Revolution, there were no major battles but there were local clashes. In 1911, troops loyal to Francisco I. Madero entered Colima and suspended the state congress. After the war, social organizations that would mark Mexico's development for much of the 20th century were created in Colima as well, especially ejidos, with the one in Suchitlán being the first. Another important movement was the creation of workers' unions and cooperatives such as the Unión de Estibadores in Manzanillo. In 1919, President Venustiano Carranza created the Sociedad Cooperativa de Salineros in the city of Colima with the exclusive rights to extract salt from Cuyutlán Lake. These changes were imposed by federal authorities outside of Colima, leading to political instability within the state, especially during elections.

Federal intervention from Mexico City continued into the 1920s, with a number of laws to reform schools, hospitals and other institutions, which before had been mostly operated by the Catholic Church. This was opposed by many in the state who supported the Church's formerly prominent role in political and social affairs. The Ley de Cultos (Religion Law) of 1926 gave rise to the Cristero War pitting those favoring the Catholic Church against those favoring agrarian and socialist reform. Battles and skirmishes related to this conflict took place in a number of locales in Mexico but it caused severe problems in Colima, causing major divisions with no formal resolution.

Textile production that began in the 19th century ended by the mid 20th century, though farmers continued to grow cotton to ship to Guadalajara. In the 1940s, the Tecomán Valley began to be intensively cultivated, creating a new source income for the state, with limes as the principle crop, and leading to the development of agro-industry.

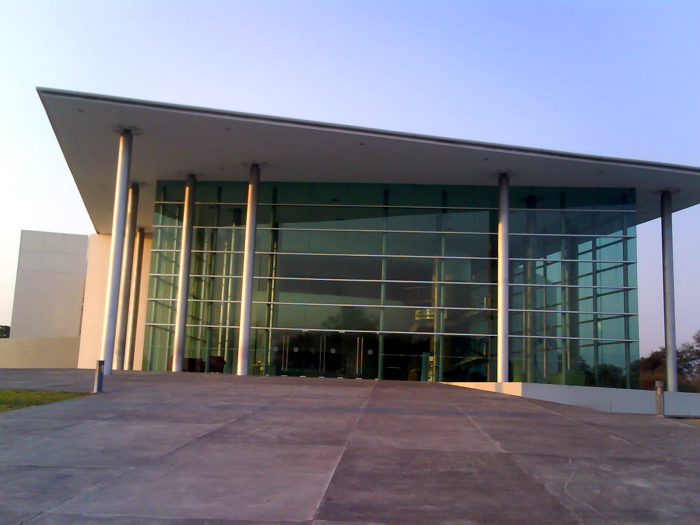
Colima University Hall "Coronel Pedro Torres Ortiz"

The Universidad (Popular) de Colima was founded in 1942.

Much of the history of the latter 20th century into the present revolves around economic development. A hurricane devastated the state in 1959. The Plan Colima was conceived and executed to improve the general infrastructure of the state during the 1980s by then Mexican president Miguel de la Madrid. It was prompted mostly by road congestion due to port shipping in Manzanillo as well as the growing tourism sector. It was designed to facilitate in-state transportation and connect the state better to the rest of Mexico. The main aspect of the plan was the construction of highways such as the highway that connects Manzanillo to Guadalajara and then onto Tampico. This highway was amplified at the end of the decade and made a toll road on approach to Manzanillo. The last decades have seen a new wave of industrial construction with the building of facilities for businesses such as Cementos Apasco, Citrojugo, Brun Foods, Embotelladora de Tecomán, Consorcio Minero Benito Juárez-Peña Colorada, Grupo Agroindustrial de Occidente, AMTEX and others.

Mexico's struggles with drug traffickers include the state, which is along Pacific Coast smuggling routes. For the first quarter of 2011, there were 52 registered homicides in the state, most linked to organized crime. This is significantly higher than previous years with most of these occurring in Colima, Villa de Alvarez and Manzanillo.

== Archaeology ==
A very early culture in Colima was Capacha culture, developing in the region between 2000 and 1200 BCE.

El Chanal is located four km north of the city of Colima. It is a complex of pyramid platforms with stairs, a Mesoamerican ballcourt and a number of plazas. A distinctive feature of the site are stones with glyphs that are found on stairways.

La Campana is in the urban area of Villa de Álvarez. It is a ceremonial center with various temples and pyramidal platforms with rounded edges. At least one of the platforms was used as a mausoleum with the tomb inside still visible.

== Education ==
The state has 307 preschools, 510 primary schools, 131 middle schools and 57 high school and vocational level schools. Today, over 85% of the population finishes primary school. Just under 90% of those who start middle school finish. Over 91% of the population over the age of 15 is literate. About 12% of the population has a university level education and 26% less than primary.

High school level education is available in all regions of the state, with just under sixty percent of those starting a program finishing it, with most that do not dropping out.

The state system also has schools dedicated to special education, vocational training and early childhood centers for those needing various types of physical and educational therapy. Literacy programs for adults are handled by INEA and CONAFE.

Higher education consists of a number of technological schools, universities and teachers' colleges. Just over half of these are located in the city of Colima, with about 19% in Villa de Alvarez and eleven percent in Tecomán. Most technology related higher education is provided by the Instituto Tecnológico de Colima, with 76% of the students, followed by ITESM-Colima with 7.6% and Instituto Autónomo de Educación Superior de Tecomán with 16.2%. Most of the general university education is provided by the University of Colima (over 93%) with the rest attending the Universidad Autónoma del Pacífico. The main teachers' colleges are the Instituto Superior de Educación Normal de Colima and the Universidad Pedagógica Nacional. The main providers of post graduate education are the University of Colima and ITESM-Colima.

The University of Colima was founded in 1940, following the educational philosophy of President Lázaro Cárdenas meant to provide higher education to the poorer classes. Today, the university offers high school level classes along with undergraduate and graduate degrees. Much of the institution's current size and offering is due to growth in the 1980s, and during that time its reputation in Mexico and abroad increased. Most of the university's majors are concentrated in agriculture, industry and commerce with aim of enhancing Colima's economy.

The Instituto Tecnológico de Colima was founded in 1976 with three majors in engineering and business with the aim of providing an alternative education focusing on preparing students for industry and service markets. Since then it has added majors in biotechnology, computer science, mechatronics and architecture, offering six undergraduate degrees and one master's degree.

== Sister cities ==
- San Cristóbal de La Laguna, Spain

== See also ==
- 2003 Colima earthquake
- List of plants of Colima
- Western Mexico shaft tomb tradition
