= Yaonáhuac (municipality) =

- Municipality
- Location within Puebla (state) Location within Mexico
- Coordinates: 19°54′50″N 97°26′55″W
- Country: Mexico
- State: Puebla
- Time zone: UTC-6 (Zona Centro)

Yaonáhuac is a municipality in the Mexican state of Puebla.

== History ==
Some people affirm that this municipality was primitively called Hueyaonáhuac and that it was founded by the Otomíes and Totonacas, in pre-Hispanic times. It was under the triple alliance (Mexico-Texcoco-Tlacopan).

The Spaniards implanted the slave-driven system of charges. It belonged to the old district of Tlatlauquitepec and in the 1895 it was constituted as a free municipality.

== Location ==
The municipality is located in the northwest of the state of Puebla. Its geographical co-ordinates are 19° 52' 06" to 19° 59' 48" N and from 97° 21' 54" to 97° 27' 18" W..

It is adjacent to

- Tlatlauquitepec, to the north and west
- Hueyapan, to the east
- Teteles de Ávila Castillo, to the south

== Extension ==
It has a surface of 5,485 km^{2}. Which locates in the place 160 with respect to the other municipalities of the state of Puebla.

== Orography ==
This municipality belongs to two morphologic regions of level 1.000 towards the north, to the declivity of the Gulf of México and the same level towards the south and to the North mountain range. The North mountain range or mountain range of Puebla is formed by more or less individual, parallel mountain ranges, compressed a con the others and that usually forms great or small high plateaus intermountains that frequently appear stepped towards the coast; whereas the declivity of the gulf is the northern one of the North mountain range towards the coastal plain of the Gulf of Mexico, it characterizes by his numerous volcanic chimneys and isolated hills.

The relief of the municipality in general is rough; to the south it presents/displays a more or less flat topography with a smooth declivity the north–south; in agreement pronouncing advances in this direction becomes the reduction more irregular and, by the irruption of an originating mountain range of the west and that crosses the municipality from the central part towards the north in direction southwestern-north. The presence of the mountain range to which the Germancos hill belongs, causes a declivity west-this, that adds to the general declivity south–north. But to the north a series of isolated hills exists that return rough still more the relief, emphasizing the Caxtomaquimatépetl and the Portezuelo.

The height of the municipality varies from 240 to 1,700 m (790 to 5,580 ft) above sea level.

== Hydrography ==
The municipality belongs to the northern slope of the state of Puebla, formed by the different partial river basins from the rivers that end at the Gulf of Mexico. The rivers are characterized by their strength and great amount of falls.

The municipality is located within the basin of the Tecolutla River, and is crossed by the Xucayucan River, bursts in the Southeastern and bathes the central part in direction the southwestern-northwest in a route of more than 12 km (7.5 mi), until being united to the Teziutanapan where it forms the Atexcaco.

The Ajocotzingo river bathes the Southeastern of the south to north and after a short route it is united to the Xucayucán. The Atexcaco river has a long-haul by the central part (more than 7 kilometers or 4.5 miles) until being united to the Apulco.

Finally, the Apulco river that has a long-haul by the North mountain range; south-north for later outside the municipality being united to the Tecolutla enters the municipality in direction. Also it presents and displays some intermittent streams that are united to the rivers already mentioned. Climate is temperate and humid with rains all the year. One river appears in an area reduced to the south of the municipality.

== Main ecosystems ==
Most of the municipality is covered with forests, located in the mountainous zones, the associations of pine-encino, and mesófilos mountain forests predominate, with arboreal species such as colored pine, rivets, jaboncillo, to liquidámbar, cedar in the hot part.

=== Fauna ===
Tlacuaches, squirrels, rabbits, armadillos, variety of serpents, spider (tarántulas), capulina spider, and variety of canoras birds.

=== Natural resources ===
Account with forests in which the fine wood abound and of construction. Characteristics of the use of the ground In the territory of the municipality two types of grounds are identified: Andosol. It is predominant ground, percent of the municipality occupies more of the 75 and presents/displays deep lítica phase (rock between 50 and 100 cm (19.5 and 39.5 in) in depth). Luvisol. It occupies the margins of the Apulco river, presents/displays deep lítica phase.

== Sociodemographic profile ==
The ethnic Groups Predominates the ethnic group Náhuatl. Demographic evolution The municipality counts according to the count of population in 1995 of the INEGI, with 6.406 inhabitants, a density of population of 117 inhabitants by square kilometer and one rate of annual growth of 3,24% calculates that for the year the 2000 population ascends to 7,209 reason why will have a density of 131 inhabitants by square kilometer.

Account with an index of 0.338 marginalization reason why is considered like stop, reason why it is located in place 113 with respect to the other municipalities of the state.

It has a rate of natality of 26.2%; a rate of mortality of 4.9% and one rate of infantile mortality of 66.7%.

=== Religion ===
Within the municipality, the predominant religion is the catholic, with a 90%, following secondly the Protestant or evangelista to him with a 10%.

== Social infrastructure ==
=== Education ===
The municipality counts on an educative infrastructure in the scholastic cycle of 2007 in the following levels:

Formal pre-schools (Kinder)

- Indigenous Preescolar account with 5 schools
- Pre-schoolers of CONAFE is counted on 2 schools

Primary schools

- In the Primary level of formal it is counted on 5 schools,
- Primary Native counts on 5 schools
- Primary of CONAFE counts on 2 schools

Secondary schools

- 3 schools

Baccalaureate

- 2 schools

High school

- 1 school (e-learning model)

=== Health ===
The attention to the health in the municipality is provided through a clinic of IMSS-Solidaridad, in addition to SS, IMSS. Also it is counted on 7 CLINICS of HEALTH in his localities.

=== Supplies ===
Within the municipality tianguis (TEMPORALY MARKET, they move from one to another municipality each day of the week, they placed in Yaonahuac in the Fridays, Tlatlauquitepec in Thursday ej.) is counted on 2 stores in the municipal head.

=== Sports ===
The municipality tells outdoors on sport infrastructure that it covers the necessities with the population that requires it, mainly the head of the municipality. Account with a field of soccer in the municipal head and three fields of basquetbol.

=== Housing ===
The inhabitants of the municipality of Yaonáhuac lodge in 1,110 houses. The material used for its construction in ceilings walls and floors is of slab of concrete, brick, block, stone, cement, some without these items are made with wood and cartoon.

=== Services ===
Data provided by the city council. Services Public Municipal Head

- Potable Water 90%
- Drainage 90%
- Paving 60%
- Garbage collection 60%
- Public Security 80%
- Markets
- Public Lighting system 50%
- Parks and 30 Gardens
- Electrical 100
- Main locality Mass media Account with service of telephone and mail. It receives the signals of broadcasting station and television networks.

=== Routes of communication ===
Exists a branch of the federal highway Number 129, which cross through its head and it communicates it with Tlatlauquitepec, it connects there with the highway before mentioned that communicate and cross through Teziutlán, Chignautla, Atempan, Zaragoza, Cuyoaco, Ocotepec, and its connect with the City of Puebla and Xalapa Veracruz.

The towns of the municipality are communicated to each other and with the M. head by ways of land and breaches. The transport service of passengers is by means of familiar trucks style like the combi, who leave the city of Teteles de Avila Castillo around every 30 minutes, in addition to collective taxis.

== Economic activity ==
The Agriculture in this municipality includes crops like maize, coffee and cereals; fruits such as pear, apple, capulín, plum, peach tree, avocado, orange, banana, file and lemon.

=== Ranching ===
bovine, goat, pig, and bovine; in addition to asnal, to mules and rabbits, counts on great variety of birds.

=== Industry ===
Account with manufacturing activities like: textiles, mills of nixtamal, "tortillerías" and blacksmith shops in addition are counted on the artisan industry of the dress. They count on forests in which the fine wood abound and of construction.

=== Commerce ===
The commercial activity is only included/understood by misceláneas, grocer's, grain and seed, stationery store, fruit and vegetable.

== Tourism ==
Monuments parochial Temple in honor of Santiago Apostle, is located in the constructed municipal head in the 16th century.

== Celebrations ==
=== 25 July (Municipality party) ===
Dances and traditions celebration in honor of Santiago Apostle, is celebrated with masses, prayers, processions, dances popular, mechanical games, fireworks, jaripeos, bands and dances.

=== 30 and 31 May ===
Celebration in honour of the Virgin of the Pilar; The Easter is made solemnly, spring break is celebrated with prayers to.

=== 1 and 2 November ===
Commemorates the day of deads, with floral offerings and adjustments. Typical suits the woman uses long black skirt, chal white blouse and rebozo or, the man dresses trousers and shirt blanket, hat of palm, huaraches of strap and tape machete.

== Sources ==
- Encyclopedia of the Municipalities of Mexico: Puebla
