= Coquimatlán =

- Municipal seat and city
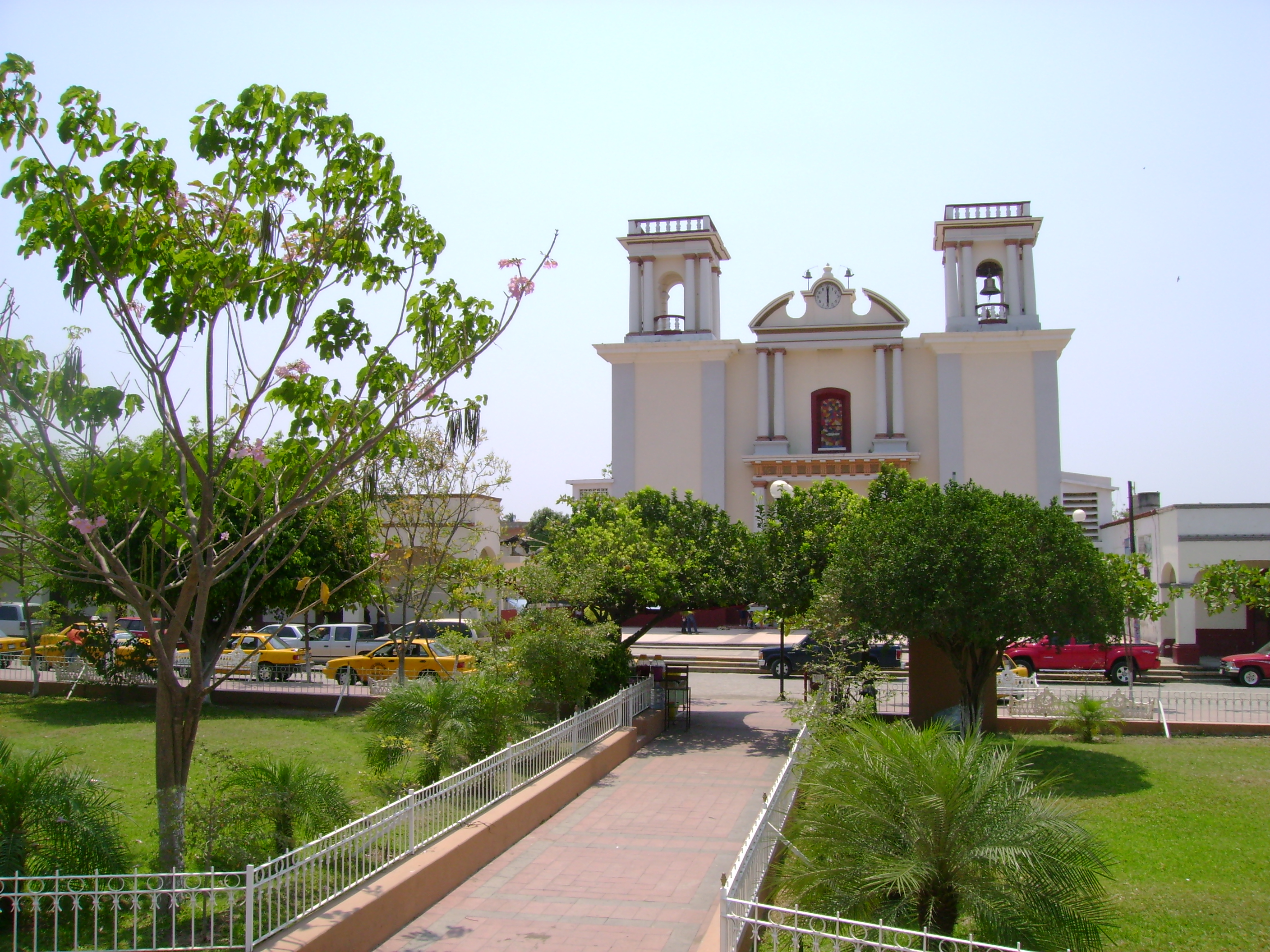
- Coquimatlan

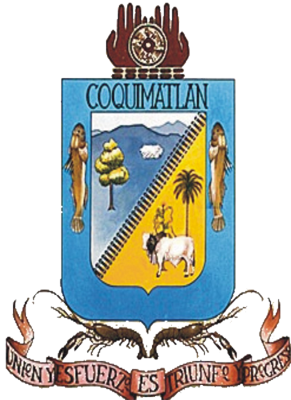
- Coat of arms

- Location within Colima Location within Mexico
- Coordinates: 19°12′13.6″N 103°48′31″W
- Country: Mexico
- State: Colima
- Municipality: Coquimatlán

Population (2010)
  - Municipality: 19,385
  - Seat: 13,358

Coquimatlán is a city and seat of the municipality of Coquimatlán, in the Mexican state of Colima. As of 2005, it had a population of 11,374.

== Geography ==
=== Climate ===
Climate data for Coquimatlán (1991–2020)
Month	Jan	Feb	Mar	Apr	May	Jun	Jul	Aug	Sep	Oct	Nov	Dec	Year
Record high °C (°F)	43.5 (110.3)	44.0 (111.2)	44.5 (112.1)	45.0 (113.0)	45.0 (113.0)	44.0 (111.2)	44.0 (111.2)	43.5 (110.3)	44.0 (111.2)	43.0 (109.4)	45.0 (113.0)	43.0 (109.4)	45.0 (113.0)
Mean daily maximum °C (°F)	32.9 (91.2)	33.3 (91.9)	33.9 (93.0)	34.8 (94.6)	35.5 (95.9)	34.4 (93.9)	34.2 (93.6)	33.8 (92.8)	32.9 (91.2)	33.4 (92.1)	33.8 (92.8)	32.8 (91.0)	33.8 (92.8)
Daily mean °C (°F)	24.8 (76.6)	24.8 (76.6)	25.3 (77.5)	26.1 (79.0)	27.5 (81.5)	28.2 (82.8)	28.1 (82.6)	27.9 (82.2)	27.4 (81.3)	27.4 (81.3)	26.8 (80.2)	25.3 (77.5)	26.6 (79.9)
Mean daily minimum °C (°F)	16.7 (62.1)	16.4 (61.5)	16.7 (62.1)	17.3 (63.1)	19.6 (67.3)	22.0 (71.6)	22.0 (71.6)	21.9 (71.4)	21.9 (71.4)	21.4 (70.5)	19.8 (67.6)	17.7 (63.9)	19.4 (66.9)
Record low °C (°F)	1.5 (34.7)	8.5 (47.3)	8.0 (46.4)	10.0 (50.0)	10.0 (50.0)	10.0 (50.0)	12.5 (54.5)	13.0 (55.4)	14.0 (57.2)	12.5 (54.5)	11.0 (51.8)	5.0 (41.0)	1.5 (34.7)
Average precipitation mm (inches)	32.9 (1.30)	19.5 (0.77)	10.2 (0.40)	0.0 (0.0)	5.0 (0.20)	119.4 (4.70)	160.6 (6.32)	180.6 (7.11)	198.5 (7.81)	111.8 (4.40)	21.9 (0.86)	8.9 (0.35)	869.3 (34.22)
Average precipitation days (≥ 0.1 mm)	1.7	1.2	0.7	0.3	1.6	12.2	16.4	18.4	16.3	7.2	2.3	1.1	79.4
Source: Servicio Meteorologico Nacional
