= Tecomán Municipality =

Tecomán
- Municipality
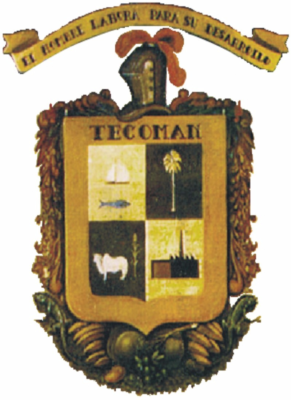
- Coat of arms

- Municipality of Tecomán in Colima

- Location in Mexico
- Coordinates: 18°55′N 103°53′W
- Country: Mexico
- State: Colima
- Municipal seat: Tecomán

Area
  - Total: 834.77 km^{2} (322.31 sq mi)

Population (2005)
  - Total: 98,150

Tecomán is a municipality in the Mexican state of Colima, being the southernmost and second largest municipality in Colima behind Manzanillo. The municipal seat lies at Tecomán. The municipality covers an area of 834.77 km^{2}.

As of 2005, the municipality had a total population of 98,150.

== Government ==
=== Mayors and municipal presidents ===
Ruler	Term	Office	Political party
Melchor Ruiz	1581	Governor of the Republic of Indians	
Miguel Barajas	1764	Mayor	
Antonio Biana	1767	Mayor	
Salvador Ruiz	1770	Mayor	
Diego Salinas	1773	Mayor	
Diego López	1778	Mayor	
Juan Francisco	1779	Mayor	
Fabián Sebastián	1780	Mayor	
Miguel Martín	1781	Mayor	
Gregorio Yriarte	1795	Mayor	
Cristóbal Juan	1796	Mayor	
Salvador Juan	1800	Mayor	
Pedro de la Cruz	1801	Mayor	
Juan Antonio Carrillo	1802	Mayor	
Sebastián Gaspar	1809	Mayor	
Juan Villasana	1810	Subdelegate	
Pedro Miguel	1811	Subdelegate	
Juan Pérez	1833	Deputy mayor	
Carlos Aguilar	1886	Mayor	
Justo Cardoso	1896	Mayor	
Lorenzo Gómez	1897	Mayor	
Juan López	1898	Mayor	
Serapio Montes de Oca	1899	Mayor	
Justo Cardoso	1901	Mayor	
Juan López	1902	Mayor	
Ventura Cruz	1904	Mayor	
Emiliano García	1905	Mayor	
Antonio García Barragán	1914	Municipal president	
Ismael B. Bermúdez	1915	Municipal president	
J. Cruz González	1916	Municipal president	
Ramón Llerenas	1917	Municipal president	
Bartolo Núñez	1920–1921	Municipal president	
Rafael Serrano, Miguel Alcaraz	1922	Municipal president	
Crescencio Salazar González	1923–1924	Municipal president	
Bartolo Núñez, Francisco Arcega	1924	Municipal president	
Miguel Alcaraz	1925	Municipal president	
Prisciliano Zepeda	1925	Municipal president	
Rodolfo Amouroux	1925–1926	Municipal president	
Francisco Arcega	1927–1929	Municipal president	
Crescencio Salazar	1929	Municipal president	PNR
Miguel García	1930	Municipal president	PNR
Ramón Solórzano	1931	Municipal president	PNR
Antonio García Brizuela	1931	Municipal president	PNR
Félix Cabellos	1931	Municipal president	PNR
Gregorio Zúñiga	1932	Municipal president	PNR
Sebastián Saucedo	1932	Municipal president	PNR
Pedro Gutiérrez	1933	Municipal president	PNR
Teodoro Gaytán	1933–1934	Municipal president	PNR
Pablo Alamillo	1934	Municipal president	PNR
Juan G. Gaitán	1936	Municipal president	PNR
Antonio Gallegos	1936	Municipal president	PNR
Marciano Cabrera	1936	Municipal president	PNR
José S. Andrade	1936	Municipal president	PNR
Gregorio Zúñiga	1937	Municipal president	PNR
Crescencio Salazar	1938	Municipal president	PRM
Jorge B. Mesina	1939	Municipal president	PRM
Ascención García	1939	Municipal president	PRM
Ignacio Gómez	1940	Municipal president	PRM
Antonio García Brizuela	1940	Municipal president	PRM
Eleazar Escobedo Trigo	1941	Municipal president	PRM
Manuel Muñoz	1942	Municipal president	PRM
Andrés López Galván	1943	Municipal president	PRM
José S. Andrade	1944	Municipal president	PRM
Fortunato Gallegos	1945	Municipal president	PRM
Alfonso Herrera	1946–1948	Municipal president	PRI
José Espinoza Rivera	1949–1951	Municipal president	PRI
Miguel Bracamontes	1951–1954	Municipal president	PRI
José Gaytán Moreno	1955	Municipal president	PRI
Antonio González Fernández	1955–1956	Municipal president	PRI
Jesús Assam Chavarín	1956–1958	Municipal president	PRI
Jorge Ochoa Gutiérrez	1958–1961	Municipal president	PRI
Enrique Bayardo López	1961–1964	Municipal president	PRI
Jorge Cabrera Salazar	1964	Municipal president	PRI
José Espinoza Rivera	1964–1967	Municipal president	PRI
José Salazar Cárdenas	1967	Municipal president	PRI
Ricardo Sevilla del Río	1968–1970	Municipal president	PRI
Filemón Cervantes Hernández	1970–1973	Municipal president	PRI
J. Concepción Rodríguez	1973–1976	Municipal president	PRI
Salvador Solís	1976–1979	Municipal president	PRI
Elías Lozano	1979–1982	Municipal president	PRI
Rubén Rosas García	1982–1985	Municipal president	PRI
Jorge Mesina Peña	1985	Acting municipal president	PRI
Juan José Sevilla Solórzano	1985–1988	Municipal president	PRI
Enrique Alcocer Acevedo	1988–1991	Municipal president	PRI
Federico Gudiño Novoa	1991–1994	Municipal president	PRI
Ma. Elena Espinosa Radillo	1994–1997	Municipal president	PRI
Gustavo Alberto Vázquez Montes	1997–2000	Municipal president	PRI
Jaime Castañeda Esparza	2000	Acting municipal president	PRI
Óscar Armando Ávalos Verdugo	2000–2003	Municipal president	PRI
Elías Martínez Delgadillo	2003–2005	Municipal president	PAN
Pablo Ochoa Mendoza	2005–2006	Municipal president	PAN
Juan Carlos Pinto Rodríguez	2006–2009	Municipal president	PRI
Saúl Magaña Madrigal	2009–2012	Municipal president	PAN
Héctor Raúl Vázquez Montes	2012–2015	Municipal president	PRI
José Guadalupe García Negrete	2015–2018	Municipal president	PAN
Elías Antonio Lozano Ochoa	2018–2021	Municipal president	Morena
Elías Antonio Lozano Ochoa	2021–2024	Municipal president (reelected)	Morena
Armando Reyna Magaña	2024–	Municipal president	Morena

== See also ==
- Madrid, Colima
