= Coat of arms of Colima =

Coat of Arms of Colima
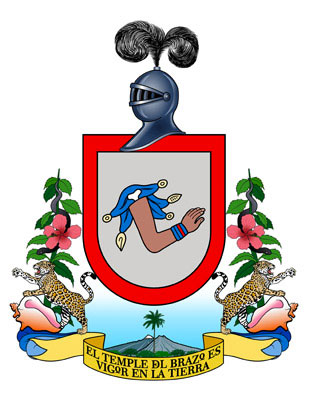

The Coat of arms of Colima (Spanish: Escudo de Colima, lit. "state shield of Colima") is a symbol of the Free and Sovereign State of Colima. It was adopted on 13 August 2016.

== Symbolism ==
The pictogram present in the Mendoza Codex consists of a bent right arm, with the hand twisted, the humerus exposed and water on the shoulder, at the top of the pictogram there is a label that indicates "colima. town". Although the meaning of "Colima" presents a linguistic ambiguity, studies on the subject suggest that the preferable meaning is "place where the water bends" or the place of the river bend.

In a silver field: pictogram of Colima present in the Mendoza Codex, which "is a human arm, in its color, separated from the body, with the symbol of water on the shoulder and that has a blue bracelet with a red line.

Border: filiera in gules (red). Shield crest: steel helmet on its side, with the visor down and facing right (to the left for those who see the shield); on its upper part and at the tip it has a black feathered headdress.

Exterior ornaments of the shield:

Supports: both sides of the shield are adorned with hibiscus flowers and other species of hibiscus ("obelisk" as it is known in Colima), with descending apalcuates (tilcuates) snakes entangled in the plant.

Supports: both sides of the shield have jaguars looking out of the shield and each one has a sea snail under its hands on waves of water in three shades of blue. In the lower and central part there is a coconut palm, and behind it are the Nevado de Colima and the Volcano of Colima, with parotas foliage.

Motto: On the lower part the motto is engraved in black capital letters and on a gold ribbon: "The temper of the arm is vigor on land."

=== Elements ===
There is a pictogram present or native ghyph in the Mendoza Codex consists of a bent right arm, with the hand twisted, the humerus exposed and water on the shoulder.

=== Historical coats ===
The symbol is used by all successive regimes in different forms.

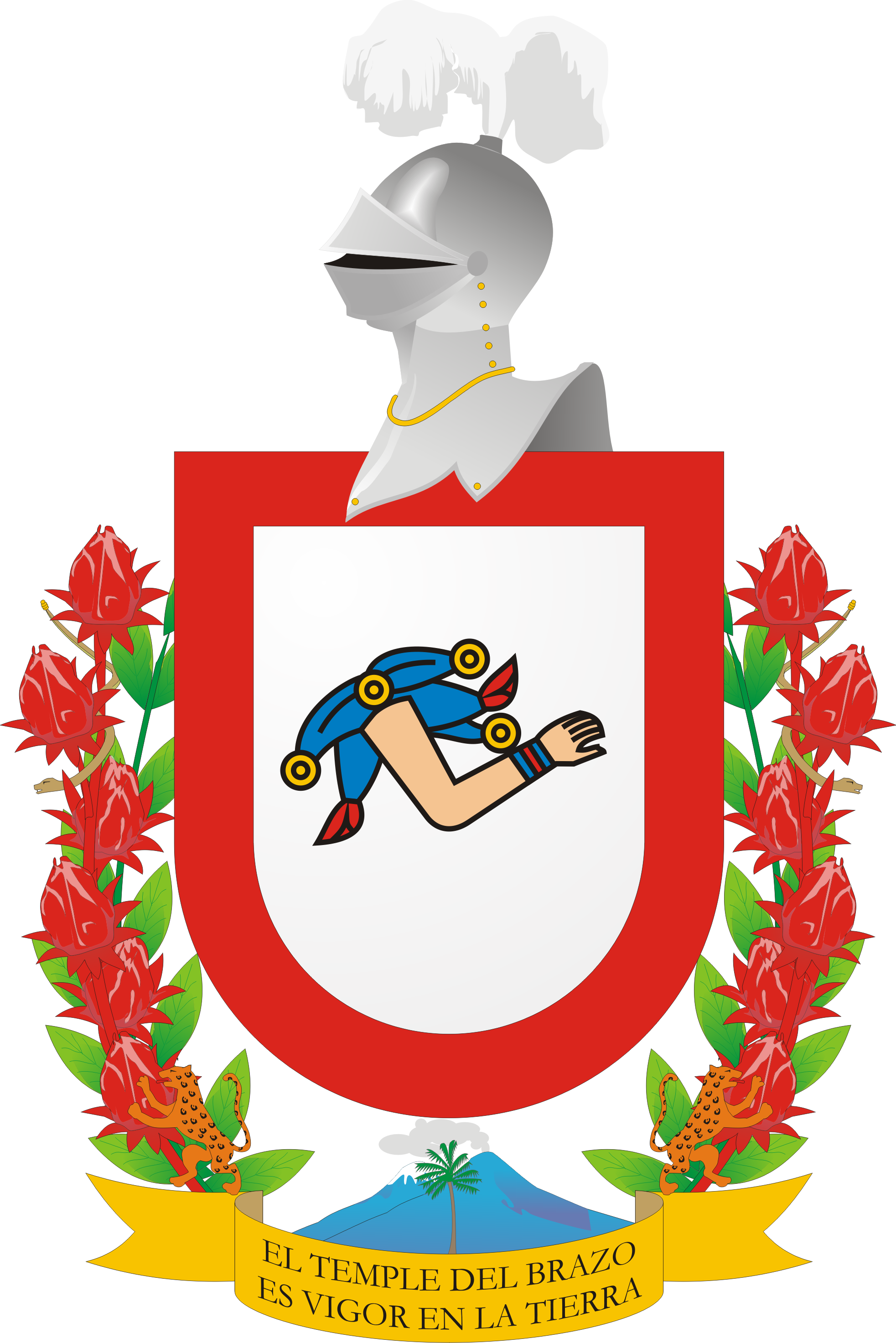
Coat of arms from 1979.

== See also ==
- Colima
- Coat of arms of Mexico
