= Tecomán =

Tecoman Tecoman City
- City
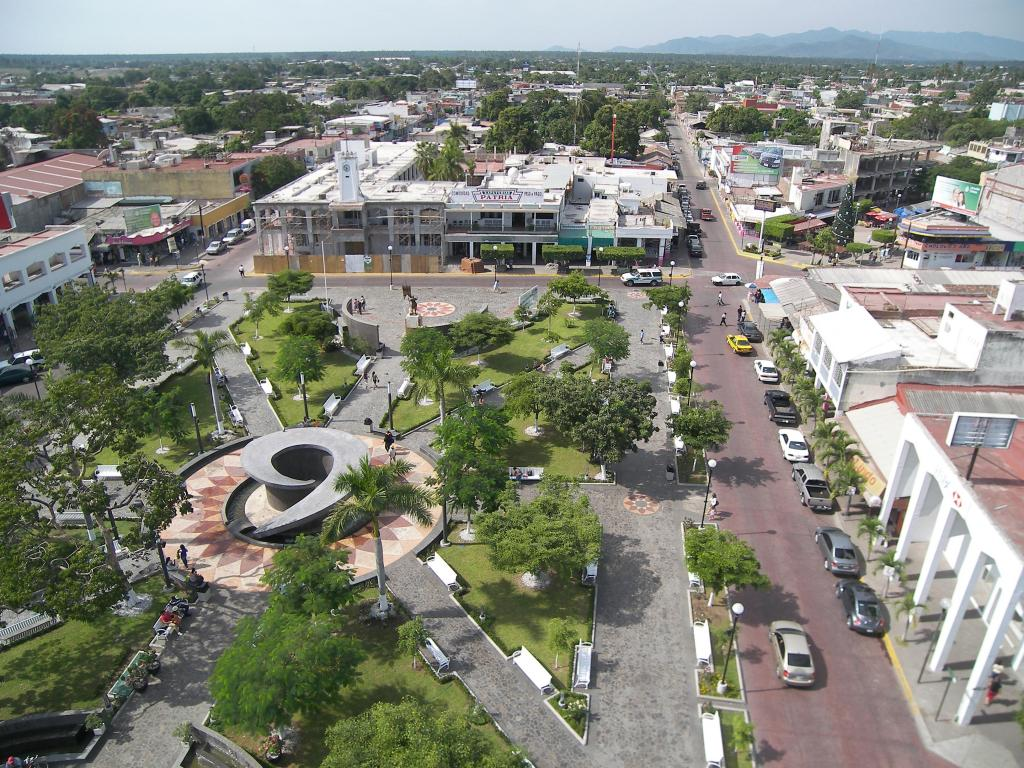
- Panoramic view of downtown Tecomán.

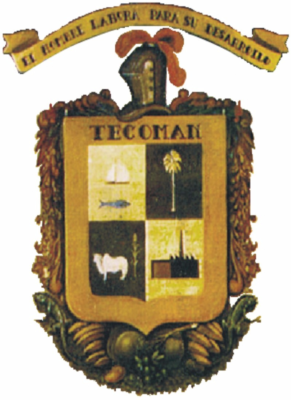
- Coat of arms
- Motto: Lime Capital of the World
- Location in Mexico Tecoman (Mexico)
- Coordinates: 18°54′32″N 103°52′29″W
- Country: Mexico
- State: Colima
- Municipality: Tecomán

Area
  - Land: 834.77 km^{2} (322.31 sq mi)

Population (2020)
  - City: 88,337
  - Metro: 141,421
- Time zone: UTC-6 (Central Standard Time)

Tecomán is a city and seat of the municipality of Tecomán in the Mexican state of Colima, about 50 km south of the city of Colima. In the 2005 census the city had a population of 112,726 people. It is the third-largest community in the state of Colima. The municipality has an area of 834.77 km^{2} (322.31 sq mi). Near the coast on Federal Highway 200, it is situated a rich agricultural industries region and is known as the "lime capital of the world". Due to its soaring homicide rate, Tecomán became the deadliest municipality in Mexico in 2016.

== Economy ==
The main economic activities of the area are:

- Agriculture: Limes, coconuts, tamarind, mango and bananas.
- Livestock: Cattle, pigs, sheep, goats and apiculture.
- Industrial: Citrus and coconut agroindustry
- Mining: Dolomite, limestone and silver

== Geography ==
=== Climate ===
Climate data for Tecomán
Month	Jan	Feb	Mar	Apr	May	Jun	Jul	Aug	Sep	Oct	Nov	Dec	Year
Record high °C (°F)	37.5 (99.5)	38.0 (100.4)	38.0 (100.4)	39.0 (102.2)	41.0 (105.8)	38.0 (100.4)	41.0 (105.8)	40.0 (104.0)	39.5 (103.1)	41.0 (105.8)	40.0 (104.0)	38.0 (100.4)	41.0 (105.8)
Mean daily maximum °C (°F)	31.9 (89.4)	31.9 (89.4)	32.0 (89.6)	32.3 (90.1)	33.1 (91.6)	33.7 (92.7)	33.9 (93.0)	33.8 (92.8)	33.4 (92.1)	33.8 (92.8)	33.5 (92.3)	32.8 (91.0)	33.0 (91.4)
Daily mean °C (°F)	23.9 (75.0)	23.7 (74.7)	23.9 (75.0)	24.6 (76.3)	26.4 (79.5)	28.3 (82.9)	28.5 (83.3)	28.4 (83.1)	28.1 (82.6)	28.1 (82.6)	26.9 (80.4)	25.3 (77.5)	26.3 (79.3)
Mean daily minimum °C (°F)	15.9 (60.6)	15.4 (59.7)	15.9 (60.6)	16.9 (62.4)	19.6 (67.3)	22.8 (73.0)	23.1 (73.6)	23.0 (73.4)	22.8 (73.0)	22.3 (72.1)	20.2 (68.4)	17.8 (64.0)	19.6 (67.3)
Record low °C (°F)	9.0 (48.2)	1.5 (34.7)	9.5 (49.1)	8.5 (47.3)	11.0 (51.8)	16.0 (60.8)	16.0 (60.8)	18.0 (64.4)	18.5 (65.3)	14.0 (57.2)	10.0 (50.0)	1.6 (34.9)	1.5 (34.7)
Average precipitation mm (inches)	32.6 (1.28)	2.0 (0.08)	0.6 (0.02)	0.2 (0.01)	17.6 (0.69)	107.8 (4.24)	154.9 (6.10)	181.5 (7.15)	181.4 (7.14)	80.8 (3.18)	38.5 (1.52)	12.7 (0.50)	810.6 (31.91)
Average precipitation days (≥ 0.1 mm)	1.3	0.3	0.2	0.1	0.8	7.5	11.2	11.9	10.9	4.9	1.6	1.0	51.7
Source: Servicio Meteorologico Nacional

== Tourism ==
Nearby Beaches & recreational areas:

- Playa El Real. 10 km. south of Tecomán. Open sea, good surfing.
- Playa Boca de Pascuales. 12 km. from Tecomán. Surfing beach for the experienced. Enramadas serving fresh seafood.
- Playa de Tecuanillo. Narrow, fine-sanded, not-too-steep beach
- Laguna de Amela. Deep lagoon surrounded by lush vegetation.
- Laguna de Alcuzahue. Lagoon 8 km from Tecomán. Visit the Crocodile reserve.
- Boca De Apiza.
