= Consejo Nacional de Fomento Educativo =

The Consejo Nacional de Fomento Educativo ("National Council for Education Development", CONAFE) is an institution under Mexico's Federal Government created by presidential decree on September 11, 1971. Its responsibilities are to research, design, implement, operate, and evaluate new educational programs that could increase the education levels among the Mexican population, and could solve the cultural and educational problems of Mexican society.

CONAFE's educational programs are designed to fit the needs, interests, practices, and overall context of students living in rural areas, in dispersed communities inhabited by migrant workers, peasant or indigenous populations. These are all marginalized communities living under the poverty line.

== Education in indigenous communities ==
CONAFE's initiative is to work with small communities with no access to education and which are unable to meet a Ministry of Public Education (SEP) requirement regarding the minimum number of students to establish a federal or state school. The Ministry of Public Education requires a minimum of five students per academic level to justify the funding, construction, and operation of a school. Most indigenous communities have fewer than 100 inhabitants, and meeting SEP's requirement has most of the time not been possible. For this reason, indigenous communities have been denied access to education.

== PAEPI: Proposal of Educational Attention for Indigenous Population ==
CONAFE's work experience with indigenous communities can be traced back to its foundation in 1971. CONAFE then served indigenous and mestizo communities from the highlands and rural areas of the state of Guerrero with the same educational program. The project of designing and operating a specific educational program for indigenous communities started until 1994, called Proposal of Educational Attention for Indigenous Population (PAEPI).

Three principles guided the creation of PAEPI's framework:

1. Each teacher has to speak the language spoken by the community where she/he is located, or at least she/he ought to speak a language from the same language family of the language spoken by the community.
2. Literacy teaching is to take place in the students’ first language.
3. The culture of each community ought to be a guiding principle in the coursework.

By 2005, positive empirical results of PAEPI were already visible in 22 of the 31 Mexican states. CONAFE granted PAEPI full status as a Program, changing its acronym to MAEPI, which stands for Modality of Educational Attention for Indigenous Population.

== MAEPI: Modality of Educational Attention for Indigenous Population ==
MAEPI operates its primary education program in indigenous communities of less than 100 inhabitants and its preschool program with populations with less than 500 inhabitants.

Indigenous teenagers and young adults are recruited by MAEPI to serve as Community Instructors in marginalized and isolated communities for a period of one or two years. During this period they are hosted and fed by the community where they are located. They also receive a monthly stipend to help them meet their basic needs. Once they finish their one-year service as Community Instructors, they receive a monthly scholarship over a period of 30 months. Those who completed a 2-years service get the scholarship during a period of 60 months.

Community Instructors are between 14 and 25 years old. They must have completed their secondary school degree in order to be eligible for a Community Instructor position. CONAFE targets specifically this group age since our main goal is to encourage students to continue their studies by making it a real and affordable possibility.

Today, 3,722 communities and 30,000 students are benefited by MAEPI.

There are three major action areas involved in MAEPI:

1. the training of Community Instructors
2. the design and operation of basic education programs
3. the production of didactic materials. The general characteristics of these areas are explained below.

=== Training of Community Instructors ===
There are two different training processes that help instructors to develop abilities for their performance as teachers in the indigenous communities. The first one is the Initial Training. It is offered before the start of the school year, during a period of intensive daily training sessions that last over one month. The second one is the Permanent Training that takes place in monthly meetings where Community Instructors get together with other key actors involved in the educational program, such as Tutors, Educational Assistants, Academic or Regional Coordinators and other staff members. These meetings are held for people to exchange thoughts and feelings about their experience in the communities, the problems and obstacles they have faced, the strategies they have implemented to solve them, and the needs they have found and demand attention. Each actor has specific objectives to meet at these meetings according to their responsibilities.

The training covers three fields: Education, Linguistic Research and Workshop, and Technology. Instructors are trained to understand and apply the educational principles and methodology of MAEPI. They are also introduced to linguistic analysis and exercises that can help them create a practical alphabet of their own language. Instructors are also taught how to use technological devises such as computers, scanners, printers, digital cameras and sound recorders, software (Microsoft Word, Excel, PowerPoint, Inspiration), and the Internet.

=== Design of Basic Education Programs ===
The main goal of CONAFE's educational programs for indigenous people is to turn the school into a space owned by the community where people can recreate and develop their language and culture; where a meaningful and useful exchange of knowledge, beliefs, traditions can take place with people coming from closer or faraway places and with similar or different cultures; where modern technologies can be used to improve the people's life quality.

Community Instructors are trained to follow a practical educational methodology in the classrooms. This methodology consists of three different stages:

- Problematization.

Students learn to identify relevant topics, they learn to problematize what they already know and think about issues related to the main theme. They identify what they do not know about it, and what sources they can consult to look for further information. Students learn to create an agenda and to plan the activities for their research project. When students have access to communication and computer technology, they can use several software to elaborate their work plan or conceptual maps. The Internet can be used as a source of information.

- Research.

Students develop skills to study on their own, and to identify, to choose, and to make use of different useful sources of information. Sources can be books and other written material, as well as people's oral testimonies, stories, and opinions about a specific issue. Computer technology can be used to document the activities in the research processes, and to store images and sound recordings.

- Organization and socialization of the learning process.

Due to the multilevel character of MAEPI courses, one of the guiding principles of the course is that students learn to play the role of experts, teachers, and coordinators when circumstances demand it.

=== Participation in the Class ===
Adults and children may learn together in the same classroom, as well as students with different ages and at different school levels; students who only speak an indigenous language work together with bilingual students who speak Spanish and an indigenous language.

On one hand, students learn to listen and respect the person in charge of an activity, an exposition, a class presentation, or a project. This person will not always be the Community Instructor, since every person in the community or in the classroom can have that role.

On the other hand, students also learn to communicate what they know and what they have learned, they learn to lead a class presentation or discussion, to present a community campaign, to spread information.

Instructors can use several software to make follow-ups of the group's and students’ participation. They can use email to communicate and coordinate tasks and activities with other instructors, coordinators, and other actors involved in MAEPI. Instructors and students may also create websites to publish their work, and to discover the work of other students in the different regions where MAEPI reaches out. Students design and produce posters, cards, flyers, for events, meetings and other activities in their communities.

=== Production of Didactic Material ===
There is a wide diversity of indigenous languages and variant dialects in Mexico and in the communities where MAEPI operates.

Given that the production and publishing of books in some of the most widely spoken indigenous languages would miss the educational purposes of MAEPI, namely to offer quality education in the first language of every group of students, MAEPI has encouraged Community Instructors and students to create their own didactic materials using their own language, their imagination and creative skills.

=== Bilingual materials ===
To pursue this goal, MAEPI has strived to:

1. Raise awareness among students and Community Instructors about the richness and potentialities of their language.
2. Have Community Instructors develop basic writing and reading skills in the indigenous language that they speak.
3. Design tools to systematize the community's knowledge to draw from this information the topics and contents of the didactic material (filing cards, journals, etc.)

Each MAEPI school has made bilingual, handwritten material in Spanish and in indigenous languages. This material keeps growing year by year. In addition, MAEPI schools are provided with the Spanish written books that the Ministry of Public Education (SEP) distributes at the national level.

In this way, MAEPI instructors and students not only learn to read and write, they learn how to create their own means of communication and expression, they develop skills to think and to imagine them, to define their purpose, to choose meaningful educational contents, to present the information in the most appropriate way, and to create a format that fits the purposes. Community Instructors and students learn how to use different sources of information, and at the same time, they become informants of their own culture, language and knowledge.

=== CECMI: The Community Education Center ===
Since 1994, MAEPI designed and operated preschool and primary educational programs. Creating a secondary program for young students, as well as primary and secondary program for adults soon became a visible need of the communities where MAEPI operated. These programs began to be designed and piloted in 2002, along with a program of Initial Education directed to pregnant women and mothers of under 3-years old children.

The Community Education Center emerged as a strategy to simultaneously offer all education programs (preschool, primary and secondary school for young and adult population, and initial education) in MAEPI schools with at least 8 students. Only Community Instructors with 1 year experience with MAEPI are trained to manage a multilevel class of this kind. A class of each Community Instructor should not exceed the limit of 15 students.

According to the Educational Proposal, each CECMI needs to have a library, computer lab, materials for workshops, artistic and cultural activities, and the development of bilingualism.

The CECMI project intends

- to increase community members participation in the educational programs.
- to enable students, specially women, who graduated from MAEPI primary courses to continue with their secondary schooling.
- to close the educational gap between the mestizo and the indigenous population .
- to promote the introduction of communication and information technology in the Indigenous Education.
- to encourage communities´ active involvement in the development of sustainable education projects in the indigenous contexts.

Today there are 136 working Community Education Centers in Mexico.

CONAFE's goals are to turn every MAEPI school into a CECMI and to have a Community Computer Lab (CCD) in each of them.

CONAFE and the National Commission for the Development of the Indigenous People (CDI) have signed the agreement to pour US$3,400,000 into the construction of classrooms and the acquisition of computer equipment during the term 2006–2007. With these resources CECMIs and CCDs will be built in Mexico's fifty municipalities with the lowest well-being standards. It is expected that through this kind of agreements, all communities assisted by MAEPI will have the chance to have a classroom of their own and a computer lab to make use of for the development of their own community.
