= Petate =

Mexican and Central American bedroll

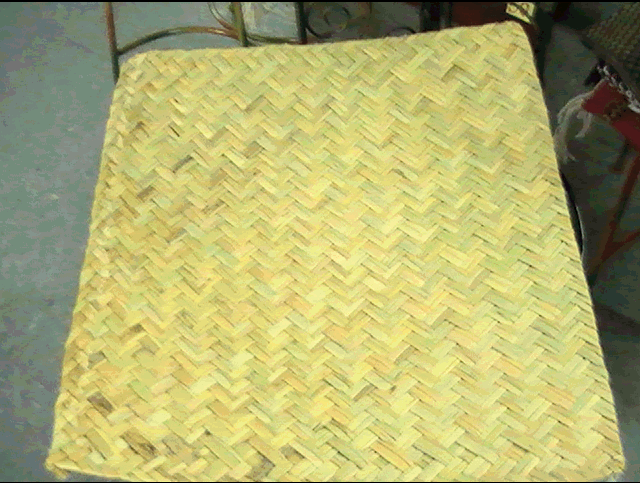
A petate, a bedroll common in Latin America.

A petate [peˈtate] is a bedroll used in Central America and Mexico. Its name comes from the Náhuatl word petlatl [ˈpet͡ɬat͡ɬ]. The petate is woven from plant fibers from various species of palms (mainly of the genera Thrinax, Sabal and Brahea) and tules (species Schoenoplectus acutus and Typha domingensis), as well as, to a lesser extent, various species of Maguey and Reeds. The species of palms used for this purpose are known by the generic name of «petate palm». The Royal Spanish Academy defines it as a bed. Generally petates are woven in quadrangular forms, though not to any exact dimensions.

== Use ==
The main use of the petate is for sleeping. It can be extended on the ground for lying down or sleeping. During the day the petate normally rolls up and hangs from the wall, freeing up space in the room. In very warm places it is used to sleep outdoors. Also it is used for drying seeds, grains, tortillas, and other foodstuffs in the sun, to prevent them touching the ground. Other items made from the fibers of the palm are known as "artesanias de petate" (handicrafts made from the fibers of the palm) including toys, dolls, masks, hats, and baskets.

== Colloquialisms ==
The petate's diverse characteristics and uses have inspired a number of colorful Spanish idioms:

- "Ya se petateó" ("He's already dead") is Mexican (and other central American countries) slang from the colloquial word "Petatear" to be dead, recognized by the RSA as a synonym for dying. This is because the petate also is used to lay and to bury the dead, mainly among those too impoverished to afford coffins.
- "Llamarada de petate" ("Petate in a blaze") refers to an emotion or brief and intense love affair, as in "the love between them was like a petate in a blaze."
- "Huele a petate quemado" ("It smells like burned petate") is used to refer to the smell of marijuana.
- "Mujeres, pa'l metate y pa'l petate" ("Women, for kitchen and bed") is a machista saying that states that women's only roles are to serve as cook and sexual partner.
- "Mala pa'l metate pero buena pa'l petate" means "Bad in the kitchen but good in bed"
