= 1955 in Mexico =

- Decades: 1930s; 1940s; 1950s; 1960s; 1970s
- See also: History of Mexico; List of years in Mexico; Timeline of Mexican history

Events in the year 1955 in Mexico.

== Incumbents ==
=== Federal government ===
- President: Adolfo Ruiz Cortines
- Interior Secretary (SEGOB): Ángel Carvajal Bernal
- Secretary of Foreign Affairs (SRE): Luis Padilla Nervo
- Communications Secretary (SCT): Carlos Lazo
- Education Secretary (SEP): José Ángel Ceniceros
- Secretary of Defense (SEDENA): Matias Ramos
- Secretary of Navy: Rodolfo Sánchez Taboada/Roberto Gómez Maqueo
- Secretary of Labor and Social Welfare: Adolfo López Mateos

=== Supreme Court ===
- President of the Supreme Court: Vicente Santos Guajardo

=== Governors ===
- Aguascalientes: Benito Palomino Dena
- Baja California: Braulio Maldonado Sandez
- Campeche: Manuel López Hernández/Alberto Trueba Urbina
- Chiapas: Efraín Aranda Osorio
- Chihuahua: Oscar Soto Maynez/Jesús Lozoya Solís
- Coahuila: Ramón Cepeda López
- Colima: Jesús González Lugo/Rodolfo Chávez Carrillo
- Durango: Enrique Torres Sánchez
- Guanajuato: José Aguilar y Maya/J. Jesús Rodríguez Gaona
- Guerrero: Darío L. Arrieta Mateos
- Hidalgo: Quintín Rueda Villagrán
- Jalisco: Agustín Yáñez
- State of Mexico: Salvador Sánchez Colín
- Michoacán: Dámaso Cárdenas del Río
- Morelos: Rodolfo López de Nava
- Nayarit: José Limón Guzmán
- Nuevo León: José S. Vivanco/Raúl Rangel Frías
- Oaxaca: Manuel Cabrera Carrasqueado/Manuel I. Manjardín/José Pacheco Iturribarría
- Puebla: Rafael Ávila Camacho
- Querétaro: Octavio Mondragón Guerra/Juan C. Gorraéz
- San Luis Potosí: Ismael Salas Penieres/Manuel Álvarez
- Sinaloa: Rigoberto Aguilar Pico
- Sonora: Ignacio Soto/Álvaro Obregón Tapia
- Tabasco: Manuel Bartlett Bautista/Miguel Orrico de los Llanos
- Tamaulipas: Horacio Terán
- Tlaxcala: Felipe Mazarraza
- Veracruz: Marco Antonio Muñoz Turnbull
- Yucatán: Víctor Mena Palomo
- Zacatecas: José Minero Roque
- Regent of the Federal District: Ernesto P. Uruchurtu

== Events ==
- The organization known as El Yunque was allegedly formed in this year.
- The Querétaro Intercontinental Airport is established.
- The Sonora Institute of Technology was founded as Justo Sierra Institute (Instituto Justo Sierra)
- July 4: 1955 Mexican legislative election.
- September 10–20: Hurricane Hilda (1955).
- 21–30: Hurricane Janet.
- December: Club de Yates de Acapulco opens its doors.

== Awards ==
Belisario Domínguez Medal of Honor – Erasmo Castellanos Quinto

== Film ==
- List of Mexican films of 1955

== Sport ==
- 1954–55 Mexican Primera División season.
- The 1955 Pan American Games take place in Mexico City.
- The Tigres del México win the Mexican League.

== Births ==
- January 19 – Paul Rodriguez, Mexican-American comedian and actor
- January 26 – Lucía Méndez, soap opera actress, model, and singer
- May 11 – María Sorté, actress and singer
- May 22 – Francisco Vega de Lamadrid, Governor of Baja California 2013-2019
- May 25 – Andrés Mora, baseball player (Baltimore Orioles, Cleveland Indians, Mexican Professional Baseball Hall of Fame), (d. June 12, 2015).
- June 2 – Miguel Ángel Gutiérrez Ávila, anthropologist (d. 2008)
- July 26 – Rogelio Ortega Martínez, educator and interim Governor of Guerrero 2014–2015
- August 14 – Carlos Medina Plascencia, educator and Governor of Guanajuato 1991 – 1995
- September 21 – Rogelio Padilla, sociologist, activist for children's rights, founder of MAMA, A.C. (d. 2018)
- October 15 – Francisco Daniel Rivera Sánchez, auxiliary bishop of the Roman Catholic Archdiocese of Mexico City (2000-2021); d. January 18, 2021
- December 10 – Juan Carlos Romero Hicks, Governor of Guanajuato 2000-2006
- December 18 – Juan Molinar Horcasitas, politician (PAN), (d. May 20, 2015).
- December 28 – Enrique Moreno, Mexican-American lawyer (d 2019).

== Deaths ==
- July 9 – Adolfo de la Huerta, 38th President of Mexico (b. 1881)
- October 13 – Manuel Ávila Camacho, 45th President of Mexico (b. 1897)
