= 1954 in Mexico =

- Decades: 1930s; 1940s; 1950s; 1960s; 1970s
- See also: History of Mexico; List of years in Mexico; Timeline of Mexican history

Events in the year 1954 in Mexico.

== Incumbents ==
=== Federal government ===
- President: Adolfo Ruiz Cortines
- Interior Secretary (SEGOB): Ángel Carvajal Bernal
- Secretary of Foreign Affairs (SRE): Luis Padilla Nervo
- Communications Secretary (SCT): Carlos Lazo
- Education Secretary (SEP): Jose Angel Ceniceros
- Secretary of Defense (SEDENA): Matías Ramos
- Secretary of Navy: Rodolfo Sánchez Taboada
- Secretary of Labor and Social Welfare: Adolfo López Mateos

=== Supreme Court ===
- President of the Supreme Court: José María Ortiz Tirado

=== Governors ===
Every governor was a member of the Institutional Revolutionary Party (PRI)

- Aguascalientes: Benito Palomino Dena
- Baja California: Braulio Maldonado Sandez
- Campeche: Manuel López Hernández
- Chiapas: Efraín Aranda Osorio
- Chihuahua: Oscar Soto Maynez
- Coahuila: Ramón Cepeda López
- Colima: Jesús González Lugo
- Durango: Enrique Torres Sánchez
- Guanajuato: José Aguilar y Maya
- Guerrero: Alejandro Gómez Maganda/Darío L. Arrieta Mateos
- Hidalgo: Quintín Rueda Villagrán
- Jalisco: Agustín Yáñez
- State of Mexico: Salvador Sánchez Colín
- Michoacán: Dámaso Cárdenas del Río
- Morelos: Rodolfo López de Nava
- Nayarit: José Limón Guzmán
- Nuevo León: José S. Vivanco
- Oaxaca: Manuel Cabrera Carrasqueado/Manuel I. Manjardín/José Pacheco Iturribarría
- Puebla: Rafael Ávila Camacho
- Querétaro: Octavio Mondragón Guerra/Juan C. Gorraéz
- San Luis Potosí: Ismael Salas Penieres/Manuel Álvarez
- Sinaloa: Rigoberto Aguilar Pico
- Sonora: Ignacio Soto/Álvaro Obregón Tapia
- Tabasco: Manuel Bartlett Bautista/Miguel Orrico de los Llanos
- Tamaulipas: Horacio Terán
- Tlaxcala: Felipe Mazarraza
- Veracruz: Marco Antonio Muñoz Turnbull
- Yucatán: Víctor Mena Palomo
- Zacatecas: José Minero Roque
- Regent of the Federal District: Ernesto P. Uruchurtu

== Events ==
- The Museo Regional de la Ceramica, Tlaquepaque is established in Tlaquepaque, Jalisco.
- The Confederación Revolucionaria de Trabajadores is founded.
- June 24/26: Hurricane Alice (June 1954)
- December 8: The Autonomous University of Chihuahua is founded.

== Awards ==
Belisario Domínguez Medal of Honor – Rosaura Zapata and Erasmo Castellanos Quinto

== Film ==
- List of Mexican films of 1954.

== Sport ==
- 1953–54 Mexican Primera División season.
- 1954 Carrera Panamericana.
- The 1954 Central American and Caribbean Games are held in Mexico City.
- The United States defeat Mexico in the Americas Zone final of the Davis Cup.
- The Tecolotes de Nuevo Laredo win the Mexican League.
- February 7: Club Celaya is founded.
- August 28: Club Universidad Nacional is founded.

== Births ==
- January 26
  - Sebastián Ligarde, Mexican-American actor
  - Jorge Hernández Andrés, businessman and bullfighter (d. 2018).
- February 20 — Jorge Torres López, politician (PRI) and Governor of Coahuila in 2011
- May 13 — Alejandro Encinas Rodríguez, politician (PRD) and Mayor of Mexico City 2005-2006
- June 24 – Juan González Gómez ("Juan Cotz"), painter from San Juan Chamula, Chiapas (d. 2017).
- June 28 — Mario Plutarco Marín Torres, Governor of Puebla 2005-2011
- July 11 — Alejandro Camacho, actor and producer
- July 26 — Leonardo Daniel, actor and director
- September 2 — Humberto Zurita, actor, director, and producer.
- October 17 – Herón Escobar, politician (PT), deputy (2009-2012); (d. October 24, 2016).
- November 3 – Carlos Girón, silver medal-winning diver in the 1980 Olympics. (d. January 13, 2020)
- Date unknown

== Deaths ==
- March 30: Agustín Aragón León politician and philosopher (b. 1870)
