= 1956 in Mexico =

- Decades: 1930s; 1940s; 1950s; 1960s; 1970s
- See also: History of Mexico; List of years in Mexico; Timeline of Mexican history

Events in the year 1956 in Mexico.

== Incumbents ==
=== Federal government ===
- President: Adolfo Ruiz Cortines
- Interior Secretary (SEGOB): Ángel Carvajal Bernal
- Secretary of Foreign Affairs (SRE): Luis Padilla Nervo
- Communications Secretary (SCT): Carlos Lazo
- Education Secretary (SEP): José Ángel Ceniceros
- Secretary of Defense (SEDENA): Matias Ramos
- Secretary of Navy: Roberto Gómez Maqueo
- Secretary of Labor and Social Welfare: Adolfo López Mateos

=== Supreme Court ===
- President of the Supreme Court: Vicente Santos Guajardo

=== Governors ===
- Aguascalientes: Luis Ortega Douglas
- Baja California: Braulio Maldonado Sandez
- Campeche: Alberto Trueba Urbina
- Chiapas: Efraín Aranda Osorio
- Chihuahua: Jesús Lozoya Solís/Teófilo Borunda
- Coahuila: Ramón Cepeda López
- Colima: Rodolfo Chávez Carrillo
- Durango: Enrique Torres Sánchez/Francisco González de la Vega
- Guanajuato: J. Jesús Rodríguez Gaona
- Guerrero: Darío L. Arrieta Mateos
- Hidalgo: Quintín Rueda Villagrán
- Jalisco: Agustín Yáñez
- State of Mexico: Salvador Sánchez Colín
- Michoacán: Dámaso Cárdenas del Río/David Franco Rodríguez
- Morelos: Rodolfo López de Nava
- Nayarit: José Limón Guzmán
- Nuevo León: Raúl Rangel Frías
- Oaxaca: José Pacheco Iturribarría/Alfonso Pérez Gasca
- Puebla: Rafael Ávila Camacho
- Querétaro: Juan C. Gorraéz
- San Luis Potosí: Manuel Álvarez
- Sinaloa: Rigoberto Aguilar Pico
- Sonora: Álvaro Obregón Tapia
- Tabasco: Miguel Orrico de los Llanos
- Tamaulipas: Horacio Terán
- Tlaxcala: Felipe Mazarraza
- Veracruz: Marco Antonio Muñoz Turnbull /Antonio María Quirasco
- Yucatán: Víctor Mena Palomo
- Zacatecas: José Minero Roque/Francisco E. García
- Regent of the Federal District: Ernesto P. Uruchurtu

== Events ==
- The Chemical Society of Mexico is formed.
- April 30: The opening of the Torre Latinoamericana.

== Awards ==
Belisario Domínguez Medal of Honor – Gerardo Murillo ("Dr. Atl")

== Film ==
- List of Mexican films of 1956

== Sport ==
- 1955–56 Mexican Primera División season
- The Diablos Rojos del México win the Mexican League.
- Mexico participate at the 1956 Summer Olympics.
- Establishment of the Mexican Center League.
- January 1: Club de Futbol Ballenas Galeana Morelos is founded.

== Births ==
- March 23 — Fidel Demédicis Hidalgo was a federal senator from Morelos (2012-2018)
- April 21 — Ángel Aguirre Rivero, constitutional Governor of Guerrero 2011–2014 and interim Governor of Guerrero 1996–1999
- May 8 — Javier Álvarez, composer (d. 2023)
- June 8 — René Juárez Cisneros, Governor of Guerrero 1999-2005 and current federal Senator (d. 2021)
- June 15 — Francisco Olvera Ruiz, Governor of Hidalgo 2011–2016
- June 22 — Manuel Saval, soap opera actor (Simplemente María (1989 TV series)) (d. 2009)
- July 31 — Laura Zapata, Mexican telenovela actress, singer and dancer
- August 15 – Arnulfo Mejía Rojas, engineer, architect, teacher, historian, painter, artist, and Catholic priest, best known for being the creator of "The Boat of the Faith" (d. April 18, 2016).
- September 8 – Ricardo Torres Origel, Mexican politician (PAN) Deputy (2000-2003) and Senator (2006-2012) from Guanajuato (d. April 24, 2016).
- October 13 — Ana Bertha Espín, actress
- October 19 — Francisco Rojas San Román, politician from the State of Mexico (d. 2018).
- Date unknown — Rosario Robles, politician, acting Mayor of Mexico City 1999–2000
