= 1952 in Mexico =

- Decades: 1930s; 1940s; 1950s; 1960s; 1970s
- See also: History of Mexico; List of years in Mexico; Timeline of Mexican history

Events in the year 1952 in Mexico.

== Incumbents ==
=== Federal government ===
- President: Miguel Alemán Valdés (until November 30), Adolfo Ruiz Cortines (starting December 1)
- Interior Secretary (SEGOB): Ernesto P. Uruchurtu/Ángel Carvajal Bernal
- Secretary of Foreign Affairs (SRE): Manuel Tello Baurraud/Luis Padilla Nervo
- Communications Secretary (SCT): Carlos Lazo
- Education Secretary (SEP): Manuel Gual Vidal/Jose Angel Ceniceros
- Secretary of Defense (SEDENA): Gilberto R. Limón/Matías Ramos
- Secretary of Navy: Alberto J. Pawling/Rodolfo Sánchez Taboada
- Secretary of Labor and Social Welfare: Manuel Ramírez Vázquez/Adolfo López Mateos

=== Supreme Court ===
- President of the Supreme Court: Roque Estrada Reynoso

=== Governors ===
- Aguascalientes: Edmundo Gámez Orozco
- Baja California: Alfonso García González
- Campeche: Manuel López Hernández
- Chiapas: Francisco J. Grajales/Efraín Aranda Osorio
- Chihuahua: Oscar Soto Maynez
- Coahuila: Ramón Cepeda López
- Colima: Jesús González Lugo
- Durango: Enrique Torres Sánchez
- Guanajuato: José Aguilar y Maya
- Guerrero: Alejandro Gómez Maganda/Darío L. Arrieta Mateos
- Hidalgo: Vicente Aguirre del Castillo/Quintín Rueda Villagrán
- Jalisco: José de Jesús González Gallo
- State of Mexico: Salvador Sánchez Colín
- Michoacán: Dámaso Cárdenas del Río
- Morelos: Ernesto Escobar Muñoz/Rodolfo López de Nava
- Nayarit: José Limón Guzmán
- Nuevo León: Ignacio Morones Prieto/José S. Vivanco
- Oaxaca: Manuel Mayoral Heredia/Manuel Cabrera Carrasqueado
- Puebla: Rafael Ávila Camacho
- Querétaro: Octavio Mondragón Guerra/Juan C. Gorraéz
- San Luis Potosí: Ismael Salas Penieres/Manuel Álvarez
- Sinaloa: Enrique Pérez Arce
- Sonora: Ignacio Soto/Álvaro Obregón Tapia
- Tabasco: Francisco Javier Santamaría
- Tamaulipas: Horacio Terán
- Tlaxcala: Felipe Mazarraza
- Veracruz: Marco Antonio Muñoz Turnbull
- Yucatán: Humberto Esquivel Medina/Tomás Marentes Miranda
- Zacatecas: José Minero Roque

== Events ==
- The Miss Mexico organization is formed.
- The Gorditas Doña Tota restaurant chain is established in Ciudad Victoria, Tamaulipas by Carlota Murillo.
- January 16: The North Territory of Baja California is admitted as the State of Baja California.
- April: The trade union confederation called Confederación Revolucionaria de Obreros y Campesinos (CROC) is founded.
- July 7: 1952 Mexican general election.

== Film ==
- List of Mexican films of 1952.

== Sport ==
- 1951–52 Mexican Primera División season.
- Aguila de Veracruz win the Mexican League.
- Mexico at the 1952 Summer Olympics.

== Births ==
- January 22 – Iliana Godoy Patiño, narrator, researcher, and poet ("Contralianza" and "Mastil en Tierra") (d. 2017).
- February 24 — Jesús Aguilar Padilla, politician (PRI) and lawyer; Governor of Sinaloa 2004–2010.
- March 23 — Villano III (Arturo Díaz Mendoza), wrestler (d. 2018).
- April 27 — Federico Barbosa Gutiérrez, jurist and politician, member of the Congress of the Union (2003–2006); (d. 2018).
- June 16 — Salvador Pineda, soap opera actor
- October 19 — Verónica Castro, actress, singer, producer, former model, and presenter.
- November 21 – Jorge Arturo García Rubí, lawyer, politician (PRI), Governor of Morelos (May–September 2000).
- November 24 — Laura León, actress and singer
- December 5 — Miguel Ángel Yunes Linares, politician (PRI); Governor of Veracruz 2016 - 2018
- Date unknown — Enrique Caballero Vela, actor (d. 2018).

== Deaths ==
- 12 June — Genovevo de la O, general of the Liberation Army of the South during the Mexican Revolution (b. 1876)
- 21 July – Pedro Lascuráin, 34th President of Mexico for 45 minutes in 1914 (b. 1856)
