= 1958 in Mexico =

- Decades: 1930s; 1940s; 1950s; 1960s; 1970s
- See also: History of Mexico; List of years in Mexico; Timeline of Mexican history

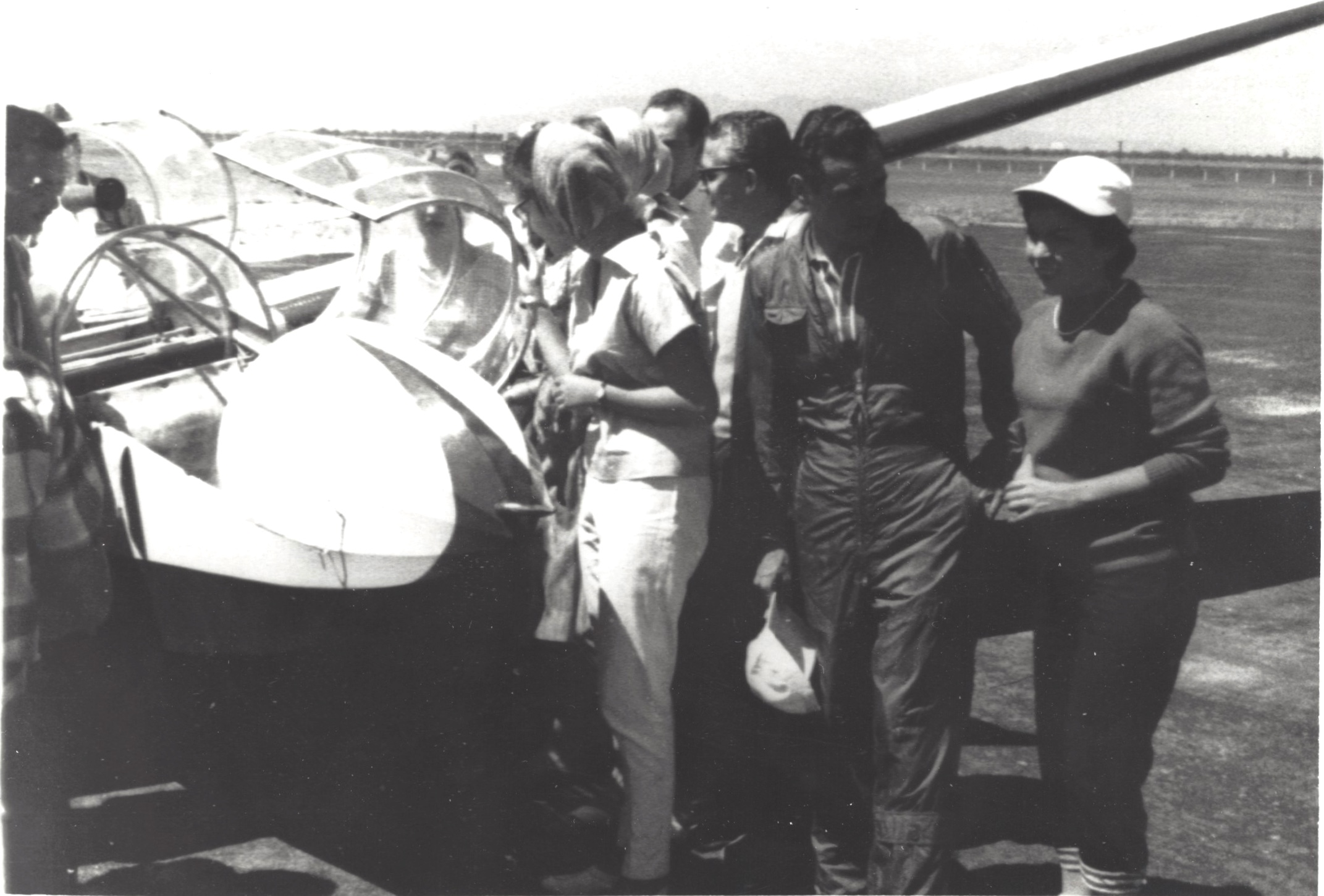
Irma Carranza with other members of the Club de Planeadores de Mexico in 1958

Events in the year 1958 in Mexico.

== Incumbents ==
=== Federal government ===
- President: Adolfo Ruiz Cortines (until November 30), Adolfo López Mateos (starting December 1)
- Interior Secretary (SEGOB): Ángel Carvajal Bernal (until November 30), Gustavo Díaz Ordaz (starting December 1)
- Secretary of Foreign Affairs (SRE): Luis Padilla Nervo/Manuel Tello Baurraud
- Communications Secretary (SCT): Walter Cross Buchanan
- Education Secretary (SEP): José Ángel Ceniceros
- Secretary of Defense (SEDENA): Matias Ramos
- Secretary of Navy: Roberto Gómez Maqueo/Héctor Meixueiro/Manuel Zermeño Araico
- Secretary of Labor and Social Welfare: Salomón González Blanco

=== Supreme Court ===
- President of the Supreme Court: Agapito Pozo Balbás

=== Governors ===
- Aguascalientes: Luis Ortega Douglas
- Baja California: Braulio Maldonado Sández
- Campeche: Alberto Trueba Urbina
- Chiapas: Efraín Aranda Osorio/Samuel León Brindis
- Chihuahua: Teófilo Borunda
- Coahuila: Raúl Madero González
- Colima: Rodolfo Chávez Carrillo
- Durango: Francisco González de la Vega
- Guanajuato: J. Jesús Rodríguez Gaona
- Guerrero: Raúl Caballero Aburto
- Hidalgo: Alfonso Corona del Rosal
- Jalisco: Agustín Yáñez
- State of Mexico: Gustavo Baz Prada
- Michoacán: David Franco Rodríguez
- Morelos: Norberto López Avelar
- Nayarit: Francisco García Montero
- Nuevo León: Raúl Rangel Frías
- Oaxaca: Alfonso Pérez Gasca
- Puebla: Fausto M. Ortega
- Querétaro: Juan C. Gorraéz
- San Luis Potosí: Manuel Álvarez
- Sinaloa: Gabriel Leyva Velásquez
- Sonora: Álvaro Obregón Tapia
- Tabasco: Miguel Orrico de los Llanos
- Tamaulipas: Norberto Treviño Zapata
- Tlaxcala: Joaquín Cisneros Molina
- Veracruz: Antonio María Quirasco
- Yucatán: Víctor Mena Palomo/Agustín Franco Aguilar
- Zacatecas: Francisco E. García
- Regent of the Federal District: Ernesto P. Uruchurtu

== Events ==
- Diego Rivera donates Frida Kahlo's childhood home and its contents in order to turn it into the Frida Kahlo Museum.
- The Aurrerá grocery chain starts operating.
- Hotel chain Camino Real Hotels is founded.
- July 6: 1958 Mexican general election.
- Conflicto_entre_Guatemala_y_M%C3%A9xico_(1958-1959)

== Awards ==
Belisario Domínguez Medal of Honor – Heriberto Jara Corona

== Births ==
- February 16 — Fernando Ortega Bernés, 16th Governor of Campeche 2009-2015
- April 30 — Guillermo Capetillo, bullfighter and voice actor
- May 3 — Rutilio Escandón, lawyer and Governor of Chiapas 2018-2024
- May 17 – Gus Rodríguez, Mexican writer, director and video game journalist (d. April 11, 2020)
- June 10 — Alfredo Adame, actor and producer
- June 22 — Rocío Banquells, Mexican pop singer and actress
- July 3 — Héctor Astudillo Flores, lawyer and politician (PRI), Governor of Guerrero starting 2015
- July 26 – Jesús Barrero, actor and voice actor (Saint Seiya) (d. 2016).
- September 27 – Faustino López Vargas, politician (d. 2022)
- October 3 — Francisco Rojas San Román, politician (Deputy from the State of Mexico, 2009-2012) (d. 2018).
- October 5 — Manuel Landeta, singer and soap opera actor
- October 24 — José Manuel Mireles Valverde, doctor and paramilitary leader (d. 2020)
- November 14 — Sergio Goyri, actor
- Date unknown
  - Abril Campillo, actress; breast cancer (d. 2017).

== Film ==
- List of Mexican films of 1958

== Sport ==
- 1957–58 Mexican Primera División season.
- Leones de Yucatán win the Mexican League.
- Salamanca F.C. and Alacranes de Durango are founded.
