= 1959 in Mexico =

- Decades: 1930s; 1940s; 1950s; 1960s; 1970s
- See also: History of Mexico; List of years in Mexico; Timeline of Mexican history

Events in the year 1959 in Mexico.

== Incumbents ==
=== Federal government ===
- President: Adolfo López Mateos
- Interior Secretary (SEGOB): Gustavo Díaz Ordaz
- Secretary of Foreign Affairs (SRE): Manuel Tello Baurraud
- Communications Secretary (SCT): Walter Cross Buchanan
- Education Secretary (SEP): José Ángel Ceniceros
- Secretary of Defense (SEDENA): Matias Ramos
- Secretary of Navy: Manuel Zermeño Araico
- Secretary of Labor and Social Welfare: Salomón González Blanco

=== Supreme Court ===
- President of the Supreme Court: Alfonso Guzmán Neyra

=== Governors ===
Every governor was a member of the Institutional Revolutionary Party, PRI.

- Aguascalientes: Luis Ortega Douglas
- Baja California
  - Braulio Maldonado Sández (until November 12, 1959)
    Eligio Esquivel Méndez (starting November 13, 1959)
- Campeche: Alberto Trueba Urbina
- Chiapas: Samuel León Brindis
- Chihuahua: Teófilo Borunda
- Coahuila: Raúl Madero González
- Durango: Francisco González de la Vega
- Guanajuato: J. Jesús Rodríguez Gaona
- Guerrero: Raúl Caballero Aburto
- Hidalgo: Alfonso Corona del Rosal
- Jalisco
  - Agustín Yáñez (until February 28, 1959)
    Juan Preciado (starting March 1, 1959)
- State of Mexico: Gustavo Baz Prada
- Michoacán: David Franco Rodríguez
- Morelos: Norberto López Avelar
- Nayarit: José Limón Guzmán
- Nuevo León: José S. Vivanco
- Oaxaca: Alfonso Pérez Gasca
- Puebla: Fausto M. Ortega
- Querétaro: Juan C. Gorraéz
- San Luis Potosí
  - Agustín Olivo Monsiváis (Interim)
    Francisco Martínez De La Vega (Substitute)
- Sinaloa: Gabriel Leyva Velásquez
- Sonora: Álvaro Obregón Tapia
- Tabasco: Carlos A. Madrazo
- Tamaulipas: Norberto Treviño Zapata
- Tlaxcala: Joaquín Cisneros Molina
- Veracruz: Antonio María Quirasco
- Yucatán: Agustín Franco Aguilar
- Zacatecas: Francisco E. García
- Regent of the Federal District: Ernesto P. Uruchurtu

== Events ==
- January 1
  - The Institute for Social Security and Services for State Workers (ISSSTE) is formed.
  - President Adolfo López Mateos informs the nation that three Mexican fishermen were killed and 14 wounded by the Armed Forces of Guatemala on December 31, 1958.
- January 2 – The Foreign Ministry of Guatemala declares that the three Mexican fishermen killed on December 31, 1958, were "pirates".
- February 12 – Martín Luis Guzmán is named president of the Comisión Nacional de Libros de Texto Gratuitos (Commission of Free Textbooks, CONALITEG) to provide books for elementary schools.
- May 23 – Pope John XXIII creates the dioceses of Tlaxcala and San Andrés Tuxtla.
- August 12 – The Mexican Academy of Sciences is founded.
- September 10 – MASA is founded when the state-owned investment bank, SOMEX, acquires the private company, Sheppard Hnos.
- September 15 – Cry of Dolores: President López Mateos announces the reestablishment of diplomatic relations with Guatemala.
- October 10 – The Autonomous University of Zacatecas is established.
- October 23 to 29 – 1959 Mexico hurricane: An estimated 1,500 people died, principally in Colima.

== Awards ==
Belisario Domínguez Medal of Honor – Heriberto Jara Corona

== Film ==
- List of Mexican films of 1959

== Births ==
- April 16 – Gran Apache, wrestler (d. 2017).
- May 24 – José Trinidad Zapata Ortiz, Bishop of the Roman Catholic Diocese of Papantla (starting 2014).
- August 27 — Daniela Romo, actress, singer, TV host
- September 6 — Fernando Ciangherotti, soap opera actor
- September 30 — Miguel Barbosa Huerta, Governor of Puebla starting 2019 (d. 2022).
- October 5 — Ernesto Laguardia, soap opera actor
- October 7 – Brazo de Oro (wrestler) (d. 2017)
- October 10 — Marcelo Ebrard, politician (PRD) and Mayor of Mexico City 2006-2012; Secretary of Foreign Affairs starting 2018.
- November 16 — Rafael Amador, soccer player (defender) who played for Mexico in the 1986 FIFA World Cup; (d. 2018)
- November 25 — José Antonio Gali Fayad, Governor of Puebla 2017-2018
- December 17 – Felicia Mercado, actress.
- Date unknown
  - Agustín Bernal, actor (d. 2018).
  - Tedi López Mills, poet.
  - Fernando Maiz Garza, businessman, builder, and philanthropist (d. 2017).
  - Gustavo Nakatani Ávila ("Yoshio"), singer (d. 2020)

== Deaths ==
- June 30 — José Vasconcelos, writer, philosopher, and politician (b. 1882)
- July 30 – María Natividad Venegas de la Torre ("María of Jesus in the Blessed Sacrament"), 90, Roman Catholic nun, first female Mexican saint.
- December 27 — Alfonso Reyes, writer, philosopher, and diplomat (b. 1889)

== Sport ==
- 1958–59 Mexican Primera División season
- The Tecolotes de Nuevo Laredo win the Mexican League
- Mexico ends up 3rd out of 4 during the Panamerican Championship 1960 in Costa Rica.
- Club San Sebastián de León dissolves.

== See also ==
- Mexico–Guatemala conflict
