= 1960 in Mexico =

- Decades: 1940s; 1950s; 1960s; 1970s; 1980s
- See also: History of Mexico; List of years in Mexico; Timeline of Mexican history

Events in the year 1960 in Mexico.

== Incumbents ==
- President — Adolfo López Mateos (1909-1969), president 1958-1964

=== Cabinet ===
- Interior Secretary: Gustavo Díaz Ordaz (1911-1979)
- Foreign Relations Secretary: Manuel Tello Baurraud (1898-1971)
- Defense Secretary: Agustín Olachea (1890-1974)
- Navy Secretary: Manuel Zermeño Araico
- Treasury Secretary: Antonio Ortiz Mena (1907-2007)
- Secretary of the Presidencia: Donato Miranda Fonseca (1908-1995)
- Public Works Secretary: Luis Enrique Bracamontes (1923-2003)
- National Heritage Secretary: Eduardo Bustamante
- Secretary Industry and Commerce: Raúl Salinas Lozano (1917-2004)
- Secretary de Agriculture and Livestock: Julián Rodríguez Adame
- Secretary of Water Resources: Alfredo del Mazo Vélez (1904–1975)
- Secretary of Communications and Transportation: Walter Cross Buchanan (1906-1977)
- Education Secretary: Jaime Torres Bodet (1902-1974)
- Secretary of Health and Assistance: José Álvarez Amézquita
- Secretariat of Labor and Social Welfare: Salomón González Blanco (1900-1992)
- Attorney General of Mexico: Fernando López Arias (1905-1978)
- Regent of the Federal District Department: Ernesto P. Uruchurtu (1906-1997)

=== Supreme Court ===
- President: Alfonso Guzmán Neyra

=== Governors ===
Every governor was a member of the Institutional Revolutionary Party, PRI.

- Aguascalientes: Luis Ortega Douglas
- Baja California: Eligio Esquivel Méndez
- Campeche: Alberto Trueba Urbina
- Chiapas: Samuel León Brindis
- Chihuahua: Teófilo Borunda (1912-2001)
- Coahuila: Raúl Madero González
- Colima: Rodolfo Chávez Carrillo
- Durango: Francisco González de la Vega (1901-1976)
- Guanajuato: J. Jesús Rodríguez Gaona
- Guerrero: Raúl Caballero Aburto
- Hidalgo: Alfonso Corona del Rosal
- Jalisco: Juan Preciado
- State of Mexico: Gustavo Baz Prada (1894-1987)
- Michoacán: David Franco Rodríguez
- Morelos: Norberto López Avelar
- Nayarit: Francisco García Montero
- Nuevo León: Raúl Rangel Frías
- Oaxaca: Alfonso Pérez Gasca
- Puebla
  - Fausto M. Ortega (term 1957-1960)
  - Arturo Fernández Aguirre (term 1960-1965)
- Querétaro: Juan C. Gorraéz (1904-1908)
- San Luis Potosí: Manuel López Dávila
- Sinaloa: Gabriel Leyva Velásquez
- Sonora: Álvaro Obregón Tapia (1916-1993)
- Tabasco: Carlos A. Madrazo (1915-1969)
- Tamaulipas: Norberto Treviño Zapata
- Tlaxcala: Joaquín Cisneros Molina
- Veracruz: Antonio María Quirasco
- Yucatán: Agustín Franco Aguilar
- Zacatecas: Francisco E. García
- South Territory of Baja California: Bonifacio Salinas Leal
- Federal Territory of Quintana Roo: Aarón Merino Fernández
- Regent of the Federal District: Ernesto P. Uruchurtu

== Population ==
- 38,174,112 (19,156,559 women, 19,017,553 men)

== Events ==
- January 1: Creation of ISSSTE, which provides health and other services for governmental employees.
- January 31: Estadio Jalisco with a capacity for 47,829 fans, opens in Guadalajara.
- February 18: The Latin American Free Trade Association is created by Argentina, Brazil, Chile, Mexico, Paraguay, Pero, and Uruguay in Montevideo. The LAFTA was replaced by the Latin American Integration Association in 1980.
- June 1: In a record that still stands, a 114-pound roosterfish was caught by fisherman Abe Sackheim at La Paz, Baja California Sur.
- August 25 to September 11: Mexico sends 69 athletes to the 1960 Summer Olympics in Rome. Juan Botella (1941-1970) won a bronze medal in the men's springboard event.
- September 21: President Adolfo López Mateos nationalizes the electrical system.
- October 7: Isidro Fabela is awarded the Belisario Domínguez Medal of Honor.
- Artist Lilia Carrillo marries Mexican abstract artist Manuel Felguérez in Washington, DC.
- November 20: In honor of the 50th anniversary of the Mexican Revolution, the remains of president Francisco I. Madero are transferred from the French cemetery where he was buried to the Monument to the Revolution.
- December 30: 17-19 people are killed and 100 injured as the Mexican Army, under orders of the governor of Guerrero, open fire on striking students in Chilpancingo.
- Date unknown:
  - Ediciones Era is founded by Vicente Rojo Almazán, José Azorín; Tomás Espresate Pons, and his brothers.
  - Painter and sculptor Pedro Coronel wins the José Clemente Orozco Prize at the II Inter-American Biennial in Mexico. Also in 1960 he exhibited 54 paintings and 8 sculptures at the Palacio de Bellas Artes in Mexico City.
  - Gustavo Arias Murueta begins his artistic career.
  - Artists Chucho Reyes and María Teresa Vieyra present an exhibition in the Colectiva de Artistas Noveles at the Galería Argos.

== Awards ==
- Belisario Domínguez Medal of Honor – Isidro Fabela
- National Prize for Arts and Sciences in History, Social Sciences, and Philosophy: Alfonso Caso

== Movies ==
- Macario, a 1960 Mexican supernatural drama film directed by Roberto Gavaldón and starring Ignacio López Tarso and Pina Pellicer is the first Mexican film to be nominated for an Academy Award for Best Foreign Language Film. It was also entered into the 1960 Cannes Film Festival and the San Francisco International Film Festival.
- Pepe directed by George Sidney and starring Cantinflas is nominated for seven Academy Awards but is a failure at the box office.
- The Magnificent Seven is a western movie directed by John Sturges, set in a small village in Mexico, and filmed at Estudios Churubusco, Mexico City; in Cuernavaca and Tepoztlan, Morelos; in Durango, Durango; and localities in Sonora.
- To Each His Life (Spanish:Cada quién su vida), a drama film directed by Julio Bracho and starring Ana Luisa Peluffo, Emma Fink and Carlos Navarro.

== Sports ==
- Soccer
  - 1960 Panamerican Championship was played in San José, Costa Rica, between March 6 and March 20; Mexico took 3rd place.
  - 1959–60 Copa México started on March 6, and concluded on April 17, 1960, with the final held at the Estadio Olímpico Universitario in Mexico City, in which Necaxa defeated Tampico Madero 4–1.
  - 1959–60 Mexican Primera División season was won by C.D. Guadalajara.
- Baseball: The Tigres won the Mexican baseball league championship.
- Tennis: Mexican Rafael Osuna and American Dennis Ralston won the Wimbledon Men's Doubles championship.
- Auto racing: Ricardo Rodríguez (1942-1962) partnered with André Pilette from Belgium in the 1960 24 Hours of Le Mans, where they took 2nd place. At the age of 18, Rodríguez was the youngest driver ever to stand on the podium at Le Mans.

== Music ==
- Rock! was the debut album of Los Locos del Ritmo, recorded at Discos Orfeón. It was the first Spanish-language rock LP and included songs such as Nena no me importa ("Baby, I don't care") by Jerry Leiber and Mike Stoller and Pedro Pistolas ("Peter Gunn") by Henry Mancini.
- Los Teen Tops, which included singer Enrique Guzmán, released their first single (78 rpm) in May, including La Plaga (Spanish adaptation of Little Richard's "Good Golly, Miss Molly") and El Rock de la Cárcel (Spanish adaptation of Elvis Presley's "Jailhouse Rock"), recorded at Columbia Records.
- Armando Manzanero recorded Voy a Apagar la Luz ("I'm going to turn off the light") in 1960.
- César Costa was a part of the group Los Camisas Negras, which recorded several singles and an LP on Musart, including El Tigre ("Tiger" by Fabian), Mona Lisa (originally by Carl Mann) and Osito Teddy Elvis's "Teddy Bear".
- Los Checkers were formed in 1960 and changed their name to Los Twisters in 1961.
- Los Crazy Boys began in January 1960 under the leadership of Jesús Martínez “Palillo”. In May they recorded their first single, with Leroy and Trátame Bien ("Treat Me Well") Their first LP was recorded in November, and it was called, Rock con los Crazy Boys.

== Notable births ==
- January 10 – Negro Casas, professional wrestler
- March 13 – Alejandro Filio, singer.
- March 15 – Rosa Beltrán, Mexican writer, lecturer, and academic.
- March 21 – Juan Manuel Oliva, Governor of Guanajuato 2006-2012.
- April 22 – Benjamín Gallegos Soto, pilot and politician PAN, Senator from Aguascalientes (d. 2018).
- May 3 – Odiseo Bichir, actor.
- June 23 – Fernanda Tapia, announcer, presenter, producer, screenwriter, lecturer, singer and voice actress
- July 31 – Pablo Larios, "El Arquero de la Selva" (The Goalkeeper of the Jungle) was a football goalkeeper from 1980 to 1999. He played on the Mexico National Team from 1983-1991 (d. 2019).
- September 4 – Arturo Chávez Chávez, politician PAN, Attorney General of Mexico, 2009-2011
- September 25 – Eduardo Yáñez, film and television actor.
- August 30 – Chalino Sánchez Félix, musician (d. 1992)
- November 1 – Fernando Valenzuela, Mexican-American baseball player (d. 2024)
- November 12 – Emilio González Márquez, Governor of Jalisco 2007–2013
- December 6 – Marco Antonio Adame, Governor of Morelos PAN 2006-2012
- December 15 – Tomás Torres Mercado, politician PVEM, federal deputy (2012-2015), (d. October 22, 2015).

== Notable deaths ==
- January 17: Manuel González Serrano, painter (b. 1917)
- February 26: General Pedro Rodríguez Triana, soldier during the Mexican Revolution (b. 1890)
- March 19: Cándido Aguilar Vargas, soldier who fought in the Mexican Revolution, son-in-law of Venustiano Carranza (b. 1888)
- March 27: Mario Talavera, Mexican songwriter (b. 1885)
- April 11: César López de Lara, general during the Mexican Revolution, governor of Tamaulipas 1921-1923 (b. 1890)
- July 14: Elpidio Ramírez ("El Viejo Elpidio"), revolutionary, violinist, and composer (b. 1882)
- July 16: Manuel Gamio, Mexican anthropologist and archaeologist (b. 1883)
- July 18: Roberto Soto ("El Panzón Soto"), comic actor (b. 1888)
- September 7: Alfonso Ortiz Tirado, tenor and orthopedic surgeon (b. 1893)
- September 8: General Adalberto Tejeda Olivares, Governor of Veracruz 1920-1924 & 1928-1932 (b. 1883)
- October 1: Chula Prieto (María del Carmen Prieto Salido), actress (b. 1929)
- December 19: José María Castellanos Urrutia, educator and politician in Colima (b. 1887)
