= Lozoya (disambiguation) =

Lozoya is a municipality in the Community of Madrid, Spain.

It may also refer to:

== People ==
- Emilio Lozoya Austin (born 1974), Mexican economist and politician
- Emilio Lozoya Thalmann (born 1948), Mexican economist and politician
- Jesús Lozoya Solís (1910–1983), Mexican military physician, pediatrician and politician
- Jorge Alberto Lozoya (born 1943), Mexican diplomat
- Luis Lozoya (born 1993), Mexican footballer
- Melitón Lozoya, a co-conspirator in Pancho Villa's assassination

== Municipalities ==
- Berzosa del Lozoya, a municipality in the Community of Madrid, Spain
- Buitrago del Lozoya, a municipality in the Community of Madrid, Spain
- Gargantilla del Lozoya y Pinilla de Buitrago, a municipality in the Community of Madrid, Spain
- Villavieja del Lozoya, a municipality in the Community of Madrid, Spain

== Other places ==
- Castle of Buitrago del Lozoya, a castle located inside the walls of Buitrago del Lozoya, Madrid, Spain
- Lozoya (river), a river flowing near the centre of Spain

== See also ==
- Losoya (disambiguation)
