= Emilio Lozoya =

Emilio Lozoya may refer to:

- Emilio Lozoya Thalmann (born 1948), former Mexican secretary of energy
- Emilio Lozoya Austin (born 1974), former CEO of PEMEX
