= Losoya (disambiguation) =

Losoya is an unincorporated community in Bexar County, Texas, United States.

It may also refer to:

- Toribio Losoya (1808–1836), Mexican soldier
  - Statue of Toribio Losoya, a statue dedicated to him
- Paula Losoya Taylor (died 1902), one of the founders of San Felipe Del Rio in Texas

== See also ==
- Lozoya (disambiguation)
