= Rosaura Zapata =

Mexican educator (c. 1876–1963)

Rosaura Zapata (1876? – July 23, 1963) was a Mexican educator who helped to found the national system of education. She received Mexico's highest national honor when the Belisario Domínguez Medal of Honor was inaugurated in 1954.

Preceded by Order established	Belisario Domínguez Medal of Honor; 1954	Succeeded by Erasmo Castellanos Quinto
