= Campesino =

Campesino means 'farmer' or 'peasant' in Spanish.

Campesino or Campesina may refer to:

- a translation of the word "peasant", referring to a Latin American farmer
- Campesina (moth), a genus of moths in the family Apatelodinae
- Los Campesinos!, an indie pop band from Cardiff, Wales
- Teatro Campesino, a theater group founded by the United Farm Workers
- Valentín González, El Campesino, a military leader during the Spanish Civil War
- Via Campesina, the collaborating body for an international peasant movement
- Bloque Obrero y Campesino, the Workers and Peasants' Bloc in 1930s Barcelona
- Confederación Revolucionaria de Obreros y Campesinos, Mexico
- Confederación Sindical Única de Trabajadores Campesinos de Bolivia, Unique Confederation of Rural Laborers of Bolivia
