= Confederación Revolucionaria de Trabajadores =

Trade union centre in Mexico

Confederación Revolucionaria de Trabajadores ('Workers Revolutionary Confederation') is a trade union centre in Mexico. Mario Suárez has served as the general secretary of CRT for many years.

CRT was founded in 1954, by dissident unions of the Confederación Única de Trabajadores (CUT) that had not gone along with the merger of CUT into the Confederación Revolucionaria de Obreros y Campesinos (CROC). At the time of its founding, CRT rallied some six hundred unions in different parts of Mexico. CRT was affiliated with the Institutional Revolutionary Party (PRI). In 1955, Mexican authorities estimated its membership to 2,535, a low-end estimate.

As of 1960, its membership was estimated at 3,917 (0.6% of the total union membership in the country). In that year CRT joined the National Workers' Central (CNT), a coalition of different non-CTM/non-BUO labour groups.

CRT became a constituent of Congreso del Trabajo ('Labour Congress'), an apex body created in 1966 by various PRI-affiliated trade union organizations.

By the late 1980s CRT was estimated to have around 25,000 members, being one of the smallest trade union centres in the country at the time.
