= Statue of Agustín Yáñez =

Statue in Guadalajara, Jalisco, Mexico

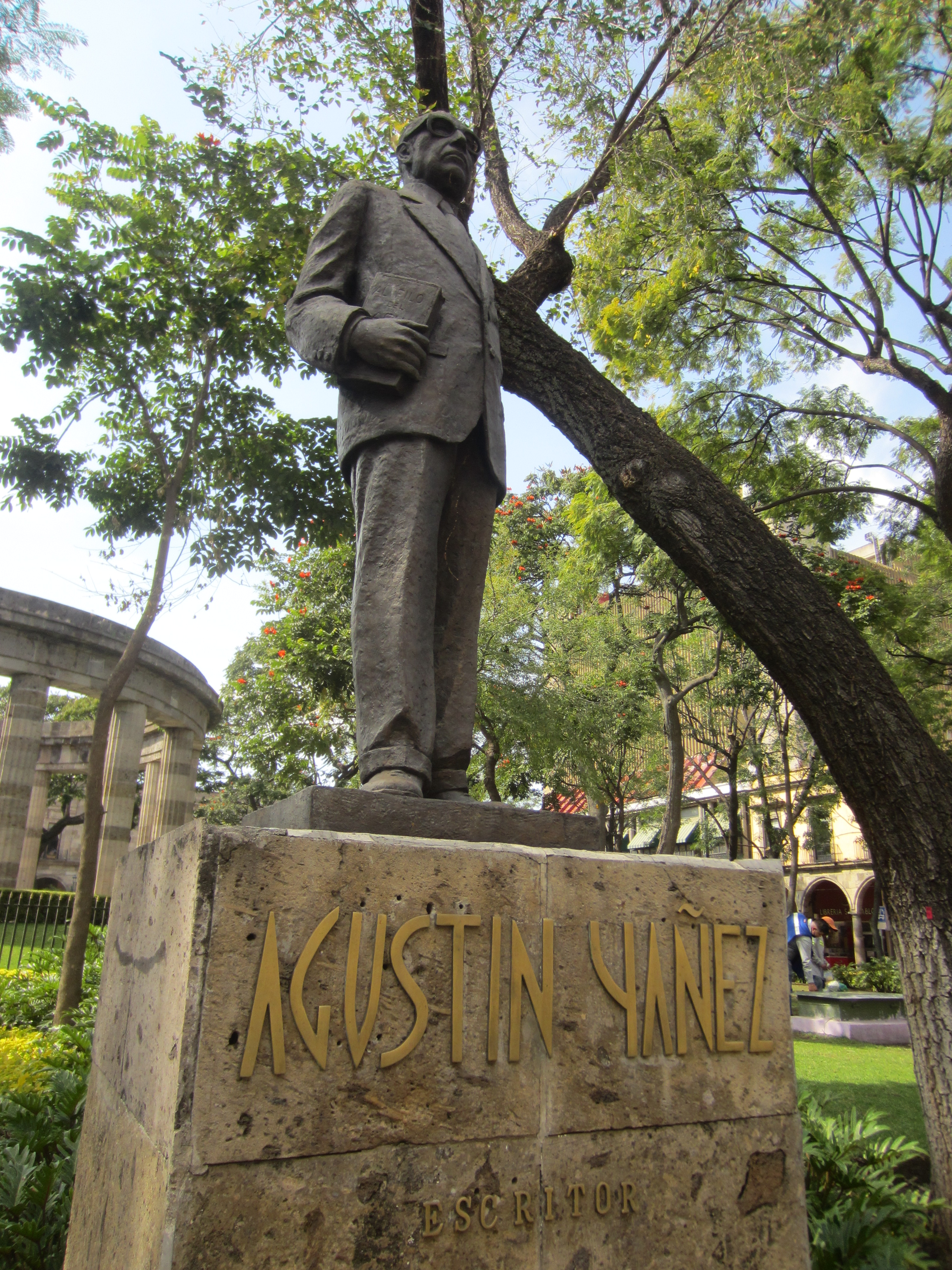
- The statue in 2021
- Subject: Agustín Yáñez
- Location: Guadalajara, Jalisco, Mexico; 20°40′40.1″N 103°20′48.1″W

A statue of Agustín Yáñez is installed along the Rotonda de los Jaliscienses Ilustres, in Centro, Guadalajara, in the Mexican state of Jalisco. Yáñez's remains rest there.
