= Librería Porrúa =

Mexican bookseller and publishing company

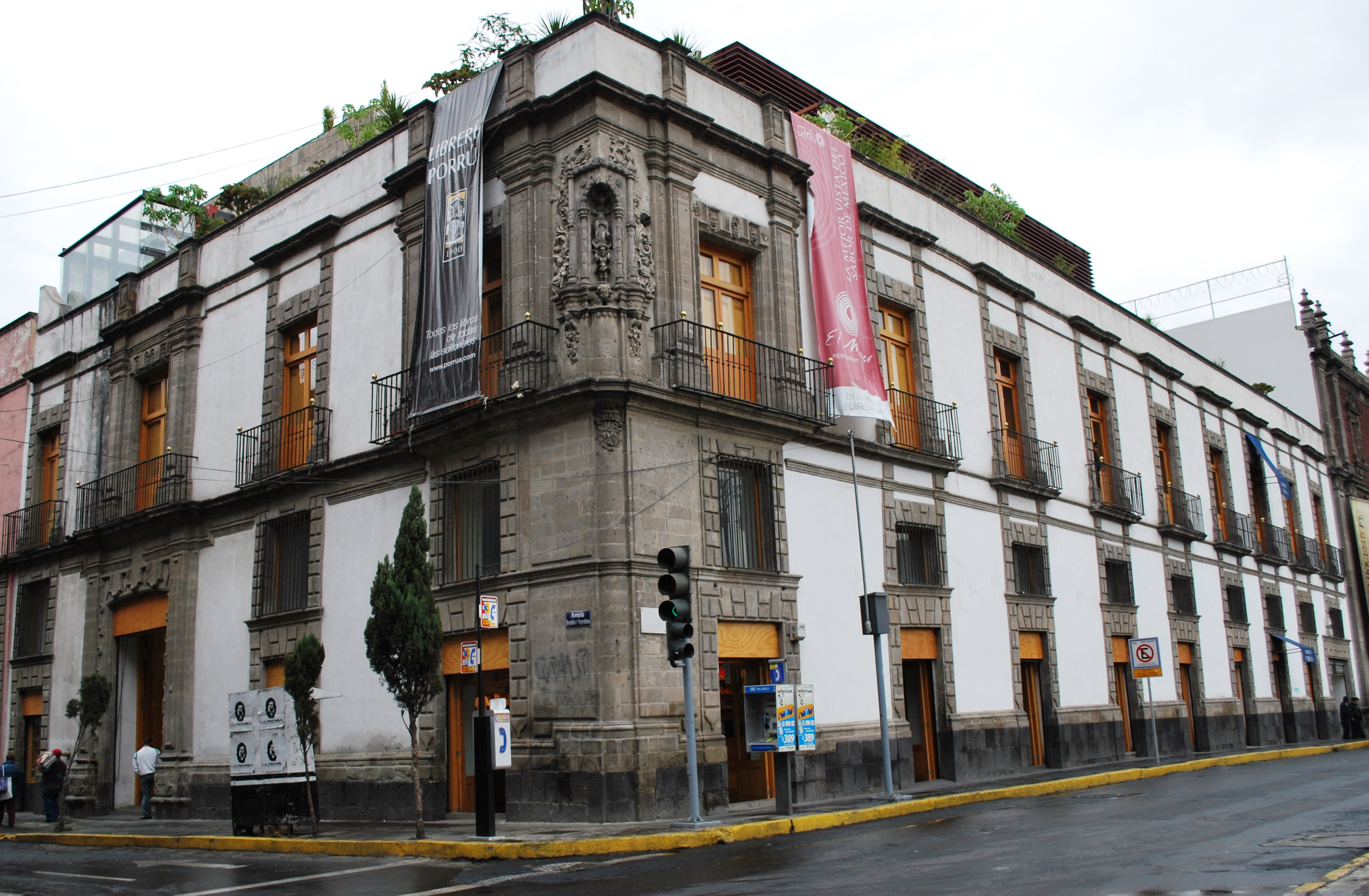
Original store in the historic center of Mexico City

Librería Porrúa Hermanos y Compañía S.A. de C.V. is a bookseller and publishing company in Mexico, and is one of the longest-established businesses operating in the Mexican book trade. The Porrúa name has been associated with books and publishing since the beginning of the 20th century, through its flagship Librería Porrúa bookstore in Mexico City and subsidiary stores throughout the country, and the company's renowned and extensive publishing business operating under the names and imprints of Librería Porrúa Hermanos and Editorial Porrúa.

== History ==
Hermanos Porrúa has over 100 years of history as bookseller and publisher in Mexico. In the second half of the 19th century, three brothers emigrated from Spain to Mexico City: José, Indalecio and Francisco Porrúa. Indalecio had a market stall on what is now Del Carmen Street, north northwest of the Zócalo, in which he had a sign stating that he bought and sold libraries. His business was successful enough that he asked his brothers to join him. The libraries that they purchased were important not only for the works that they contained but also because from whom they were purchased, including some of the Mexico City's nobility. They published Mexico's first bibliography called the "Boletín Bibliográfico" which categorized the antique books for sale. It and others like it would set the value of most of the antique books in Mexico over the following century.

== Publishing ==
Porrúa began publishing in 1910, starting with a "Guide to the City of Mexico" by José Romero, physically printed in Spain but distributed in Mexico by Porrúa. Four years later, the first book completely published in Mexico, a collection of poems, was offered by the company. The company's logo, called the "Caballero Aguila" (Eagle Knight) was devised in 1915 by Saturnino Herrán. During the 1930s (at least), the business published as "Porrúa Hermanos y compania". The modern organization of the business took shape in 1940, changing its name to Editorial Porrúa and the company began printing specialty books, such as those on law and art. In 1959, Porrúa began printing a series of classical works with the aim of making these more affordable to the general public. Starting in 1964, Porrúa began publishing its own reference work called "El Diccionario de Historia Biografía y Geografía de México" (Dictionary of the History, Biographies and Geography of Mexico) and in 1992 began a division dedicated to young readers, starting with a version of the story of Don Quixote.

== Bookstore ==
The original site of Librería Hermanos Porrúa is at the corner of República de Argentina and Justo Sierra Street in the historic center of Mexico City. The building was originally a house that dates from the 18th century and has two floors. The outside of the building maintains much of original décor, such as the geometric design on both floors, a niche with a statue of the Virgin Mary and iron railings on the windows of the upper floor. The inside of the building has been completely modernized and the lower floor is dedicated to the bookstore.

From the original store in the Centro Histórico, Porrúa now has stores in all of the states of México and is also present in many location of the department store El Palacio de Hierro and the office supply chain Office Max in México.
