= Salvador Vega Casillas =

Mexican politician

- Born: 18 August 1961 (age 64); Apatzingán, Michoacán, Mexico
- Education: UMSNH
- Occupation: Senator
- Political party: PAN

Salvador Vega Casillas (born 18 August 1961) is a Mexican politician affiliated with the PAN. He served as member of the Senate of the Republic (Mexico) (2012–2018). He also served as Deputy during the LIX Legislature, as well as a local deputy in the Congress of Michoacán.

Senator Vega Casillas was accused by Emilio Lozoya Austin, former director of Pemex, in July 2020 of receiving bribes in 2013–2014 to support energy reform legislation.
