= Práxedes Giner Durán =

Mexican politician

Governor of Chihuahua
- In office October 4, 1962 – October 3, 1968
- Preceded by: Teófilo Borunda
- Succeeded by: Oscar Flores Sánchez

Personal details
- Born: February 15, 1893 Camargo, Chihuahua
- Died: May 13, 1978 (aged 85) Chihuahua, Chihuahua
- Party: PRI
- Spouse: Honorata Díaz de Bustamante
- Occupation: General officer

Práxedes Giner Durán (February 15, 1893 – May 13, 1978) was a Mexican military official, politician, and member of the then-dominant Institutional Revolutionary Party (PRI). He participated in the Mexican Revolution as a part of Pancho Villa's famed División del Norte and became an icon in his home state. He represented Chihuahua's sixth district in the Chamber of Deputies from 1928 to 1930 and was the governor of Chihuahua from 1962 until 1968.

In 1965, while serving as governor, he allegedly ordered the massacre of a group of farmers and teachers who were protesting for land reform in the town of Ciudad Madera, and ordered that the bodies be buried in a mass grave.

Preceded by Teófilo Borunda	Governor of Chihuahua; 1962–1968	Succeeded by Oscar Flores Sánchez
