= Emilio Lozoya Austin =

Mexican economist and politician

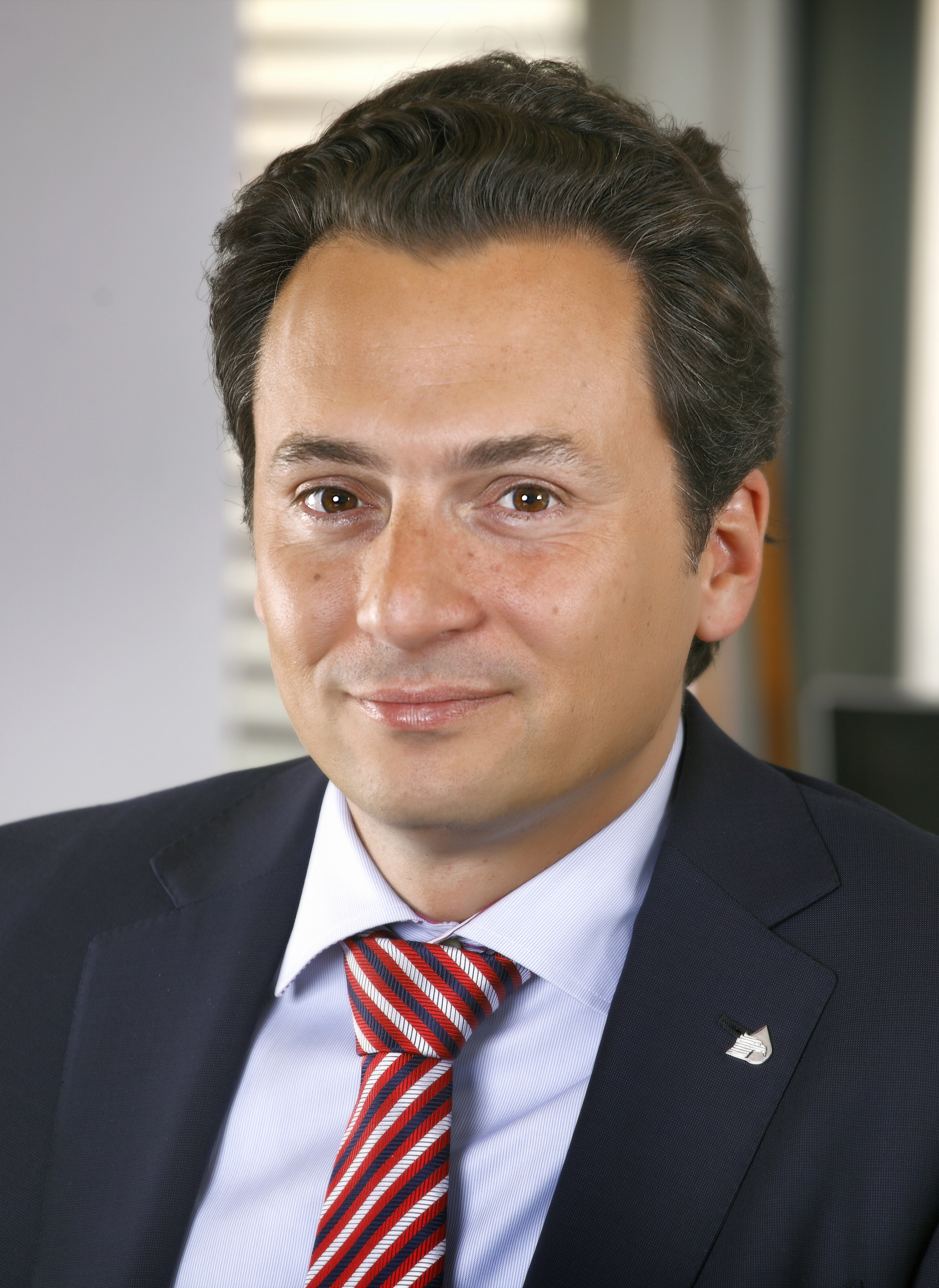
Emilio Lozoya

Emilio Ricardo Lozoya Austin (born December 9, 1974) is a Mexican economist and politician. He was the CEO of Petróleos Mexicanos (PEMEX) from 2012 to 2016. Accused of receiving bribes from Odebrecht, his case remains in impunity.

== Biography ==
=== Education ===
Lozoya is a native of Chihuahua, Chihuahua. He holds a degree in economics from the ITAM and one in Law from UNAM. He also has a Masters in Public Administration and International Development (MPA/ID) from Harvard University John F. Kennedy School of Government.

He is the author of different publications on monetary policy, productivity and competition, efficiency in public policies, as well as education and electoral systems.

=== Early career ===
Between 1999 and 2001, Emilio Lozoya worked as an analyst at the Central Bank of Mexico, where he was responsible for investing international reserves. Lozoya was also a board member of several corporations and enterprises related to infrastructure, finance, and IT sectors.

From 2003 to 2006, he served as an investment officer for structure finance and distressed assets at the Inter-American Investment Corporation within the Inter-American Development Bank, where he interacted with different Latin American industries and countries.

Also, from 2006 up to 2009, he worked at the World Economic Forum as a senior director for Latin America, where he was in charge of research and strategies related to the forum and was the liaison between leaders and stakeholders in the region.

Between 2009 and 2012, Lozoya co-founded and was an executive board member of different investment funds, specialized in international private capital investments, including restructuring and international transactions.

From January to November 2012, he headed the international affairs office of the campaign, as well as for the transition team of President Enrique Peña Nieto.

=== Pemex ===
From December 2012 to February 2016, he was director-general of the state-owned oil company Petróleos Mexicanos, appointed by President Peña Nieto.

In 2017, he was immersed in the Odebrecht bribery scandal that hit politicians and ministers across Latin America. In particular, a direct accusation of alleged bribery payments of more than 10 million dollars between 2010 and 2014 was made against Emilio Lozoya by Luis Alberto de Meneses Weyll, director of Odebrecht in México at the time of the alleged bribes. He categorically denies all claims.

=== Corruption ===
In July 2019, Lozoya was accused of taking US$10M (£8m) in bribes from Brazilian construction giant Odebrecht which has admitted having paid off politicians in Latin America. Lozoya's wife, sister, and mother are implicated in the same corruption case. For the second time, in July 2019, a judge ordered the detention of Lozoya Austin, in relation to the Odebrecht scandal. Lozoya was detained by Spanish police in Málaga, Spain, in February 2020 and extradited to Mexico on July 17, 2020.

Upon his return to Mexico, Lozoya was hospitalized for anemia and problems with his esophagus; later, he had surgery for a hiatal hernia. On July 21, President Andrés Manuel López Obrador said that Lozoya would be given witness protection because his testimony could help "clean" Mexico of corruption, and that he (AMLO) would support a sentence reduction if Lozoya's testimony proved useful. The president said, Nosotros queremos recuperar el dinero ("We want to recuperate the money") and pointed out that US$200 million was involved in the sale of a fertilizer plant. According to the newspaper Reforma, Lozoya Austin has testified to bribes amounting to MXN $52,380,000 given to legislators and members of the National Action Party (PAN), including Ricardo Anaya, Ernesto Cordero Arroyo, Salvador Vega Casillas, Francisco Domínguez Servién, Francisco García Cabeza de Vaca and Jorge Luis Lavalle Maury. The bribes were allegedly orchestrated by Luis Videgaray in 2013 and 2014 in exchange for support of energy reform legislation. Anaya and the PAN deny the accusations.

Reforma says that Brazilian businessman Luis Alberto Meneses Weyll paid Lozoya US $10 million for Peña Nieto's presidential campaign on behalf of Odebrecht in a transaction that took place at a bakery in Lomas de Chapultepec, Miguel Hidalgo, Mexico City.

== Awards and recognition ==
- Energy Intelligence announced that Emilio Lozoya Austin, CEO of Petróleos Mexicanos (Pemex), earned the distinction of his peers as "Petroleum Executive of the Year." The 2014 award, as selected by top global industry executives. Energy Intelligence jointly convenes Oil & Money with the International New York Times.
- Global Young Leader by the World Economic Forum (2012)
- Among the most influential Hispano younger than 40 at the list of Poder magazine (2011)
- Hemispheric Ambassador by the American Business Council Foundation (2010)
- Among the 100 most influential Mexicans by Poder magazine (2010).
- Among the top thirty Mexican leaders in his 30s by Expansion magazine (2009)

== Family ==
He is the son of Emilio Lozoya Thalmann, who headed the ISSSTE and was appointed Secretary of Energy during President Carlos Salinas de Gortari's administration. His grandfather was Jesús Lozoya Solís, a pediatric surgeon, politician (governor of Chihuauhua, 1955–1956), general in the Mexican Army, and businessman. Emilio is married and has three children.
