= Melitón Lozoya =

Mexican administrator

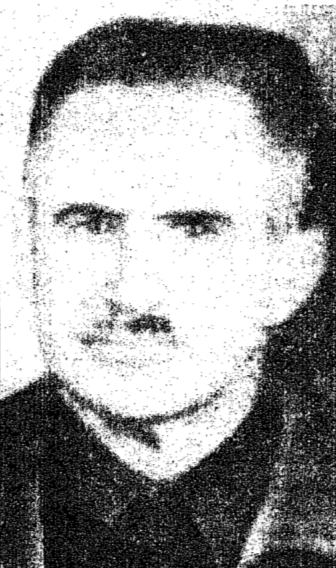
Melitón Lozoya in 1923.

Meliton Lozoya was the former owner of Pancho Villa's hacienda and a co-conspirator in his assassination. Lozoya was accused of embezzling funds from the ranch and allegedly decided to participate in Villa's assassination after Villa demanded to be paid back. Some historians allege Lozoya planned the details of Villa's assassination and found the men who carried it out.

== Death of Pancho Villa ==
Jesús Salas Barraza, a state legislator from Durango, is the other central figure associated with Villa's death. Barraza claimed full responsibility for Villa's death, though the assassination is believed to have occurred as the result of a well-planned conspiracy involving Barraza and Lozoya, but most likely initiated by Plutarco Elías Calles and Joaquín Amaro (with at least tacit approval of the then president of Mexico, Álvaro Obregón). After claiming responsibility, Barraza claimed he and the co-conspirators, including Saenz Pardo, Lozoya, and Félix Lara, had watched Villa's daily car drives and paid the vendor at the scene of Villa's assassination to shout "Viva Villa!" once if Villa was sitting in the front of the car, or twice if he was in the back.
