= Miguel Ángel Gutiérrez Ávila =

Mexican anthropologist

Miguel Ángel Gutiérrez Ávila (June 2, 1955 – July 25, 2008) was a Mexican anthropologist whose work focused on the state of Guerrero. In 1988, he developed an approach in his work on the Costa Chica of Guerrero where "the corrido poet is a social critic who praises violent action when it is justified and condemns it when it is not".

He was murdered on July 25, 2008, as he was returning from investigating attacks against Radio Ñomndaa, La Palabra del Agua, with whom he collaborated. His badly beaten body was found along with his Chevy on the Acapulco-Pinotepa federal highway.

== Works ==
- Corrido y violencia entre los afromestizos de la Costa Chica de Guerrero y Oaxaca. Mexico City: Universidad Autónoma de Guerrero, 1988.
- Nabor Ojeda Caballero, el batallador del Sur. [México:] Centro de Estudios Históricos del Agrarismo en México: Confederación Nacional Campesina, 1991.
- Derecho consuetudinario y derecho positivo entre los mixtecos, amuzgos y afromestizos de la Costa Chica de Guerrero. México: Universidad Autónoma de Guerrero: La Comisión Nacional de Derechos Humanos, 1997.
- Déspotas y caciques. Una antropología política de los amuzgos de Guerrero. México: Universidad Autónoma de Guerrero, 2001.
