= Herón Escobar =

Mexican politician

- Born: 17 October 1954; Sinaloa, Mexico
- Died: 24 October 2016 (aged 62)
- Occupation: Politician
- Political party: PT

Herón Agustín Escobar García (17 October 1954 – 24 October 2016) was a Mexican politician from the Labor Party. From 2009 to 2012 he served as Deputy of the LXI Legislature of the Mexican Congress representing Sinaloa. He died at the age of 62 in 2016.
