= Book trade =

Book trade may refer to:

- Publishing of books
- Bookselling, the commercial trade of books
