= Statue of Toribio Losoya =

Sculpture in San Antonio, Texas, United States

Toribio Losoya
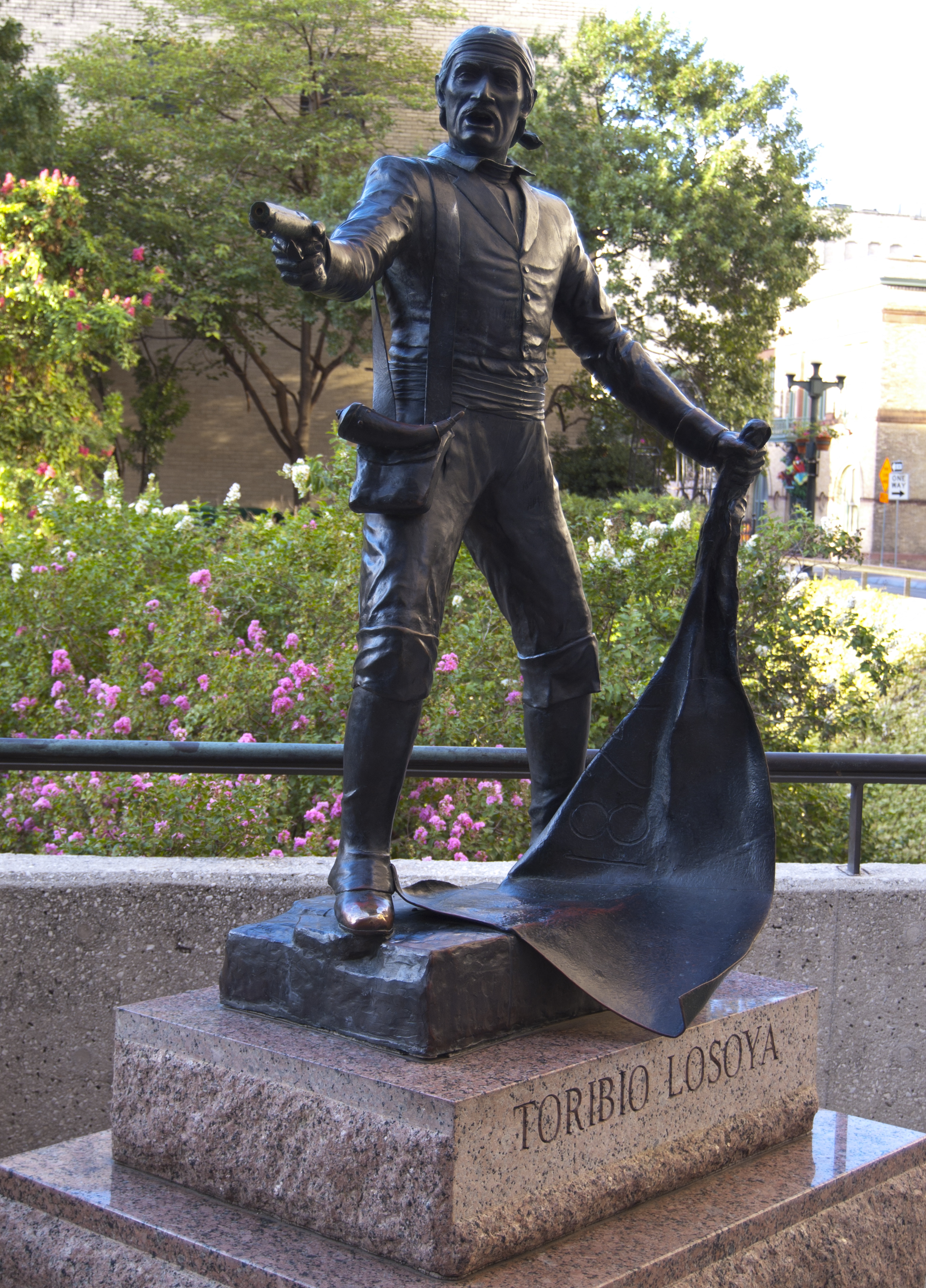
- The statue in 2011
- Year: 1986
- Medium: Bronze sculpture
- Location: San Antonio, Texas, United States; 29.425681°N 98.487769°W

Toribio Losoya (also known as Toribio Losoya, An Unsung Hero of the Alamo, or simply Losoya) is an outdoor bronze sculpture depicting the former Mexican soldier and Alamo defender of the same name by local artist William Easley, installed in San Antonio, in the U.S. state of Texas. The statue was donated by the Adolph Coors Co. in 1986 to commemorate the 150th anniversary of the Battle of the Alamo.

== See also ==
- 1986 in art
