= Erasmo Castellanos Quinto =

Mexican educator and poet (1879–1955)

Professor Erasmo Castellanos Quinto
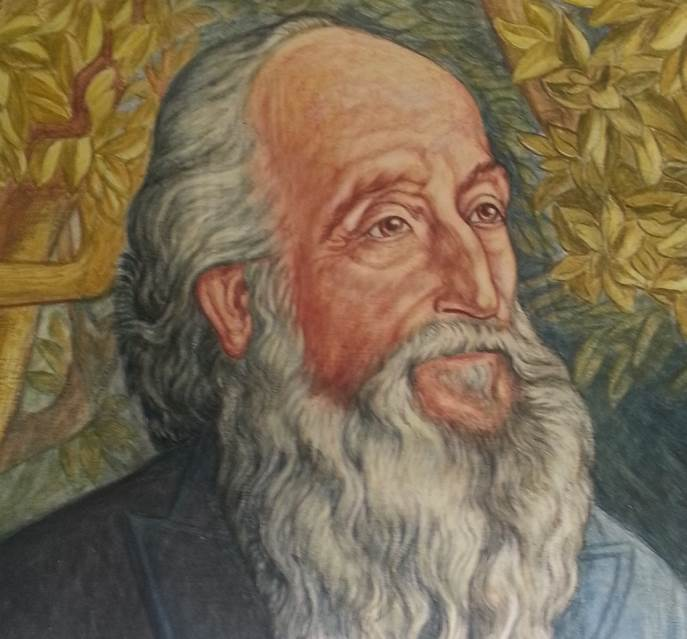
- Born: 27 March 1879; Santiago Tuxtla, Veracruz, Mexico
- Died: 11 December 1955 (aged 76); Mexico City
- Burial place: Panteón Jardín ("Garden Cemetery"); 19.3504937°N 99.21045732°W
- Monuments: Statue at the National Preparatory School No. 2, Mexico City; Statue in Santiago Tuxtla, Veracruz, Mexico
- Education: Escuela de Jurisprudencia de Orizaba, Jalapa University, Veracruz, Mexico
- Occupation: Higher education teacher
- Years active: 1903-1955
- Employer: National Autonomous University of Mexico
- Known for: His knowledge and teaching about Miguel de Cervantes works, Classics and universal literature master works.
- Notable work: Del Fondo del Abra (From the Bottom of the Opening) poetry book.
- Title: First Cervantist in America
- Spouse: Gabriela de la Torre (m. 1904-1947)
- Awards: Mexican Cervantist Society Award 1947
- Honours: Belisario Domínguez Medal 1954; National Autonomous University of Mexico Professors' Medal 1955.

Erasmo Castellanos Quinto (March 27, 1879 – December 11, 1955) was a Mexican professor, poet, and lawyer. He was considered the leading Mexican specialist of his time in the works of Miguel de Cervantes, as well as being a renowned scholar of the Classics. He lived austerely in an impoverished area of Mexico City, dedicating his life to teaching senior high school and college students, as well as rescuing stray dogs and cats from the streets.

He won the 1947 Mexican Cervantist Society Prize, resulting in him being called "The first Cervantist in America", and in 1954 he won the first Belisario Domínguez Medal. Many streets, schools, and libraries in Mexico are named after him.

== Early years ==
Castellanos was the eldest child of Erasmo Castellanos González and Juana María Quinto Mendoza, and was born on the Cruztitán ranch owned by his maternal grandfather in Santiago Tuxtla, Veracruz, Mexico. He began his primary education at the Escuela Real (Royal School) in his hometown.

Due to family economic troubles, at the age of eight Castellanos was taken to the mystical and cultured Veracruzian city of Orizaba – then called "the city of bridges and joyful waters" and "the rainy city" – to be educated under the protection of his uncle Leando Castellanos González. He finished both his elementary and preparatory level education there at the Escuela Cantonal Modelo (Model Cantonal School).

He began his teaching career in 1900 while still a student at the Colegio Preparatorio de Orizaba., replacing the poet, short story writer, and narrator Rafael Delgado as Greek and Latin professor there. Driven by his admiration for the knowledge and learning attitude of the young Castellanos, Delgado had previously dedicated his story "Justicia popular" to Castellanos, as well as a sonnet urging the younger scholar to study the Classics as a foundation for studying great literature.

== Professional studies ==
Castellanos completed his professional studies at the Escuela de Jurisprudencia de Orizaba (Orizaba School of Jurisprudence), getting up at six in the morning to sweep the floors of his uncle's business and then spending hours behind the counter until it was time to attend college. Upon returning from college he would continue working until closing time, invariably making the income and expenses balance.

Castellanos was an outstanding student, influenced by the example of love of teaching and literature displayed by his teacher, the lawyer Silvestre Moreno Cora. He eventually presented his thesis entitled "Cheques" (Checks) for his professional exam before the State of Veracruz Justice Superior Court in Xalapa. He obtained his law degree from Xalapa University on November 30, 1903, studies that he would further in Mexico City.

After migrating to Mexico City he practised law in the office of attorney Luis Gutiérrez Otero, who had recommended him to Porfirio Díaz, then President of Mexico. During this period Castellanos held Sunday meetings in his home where literary and musical topics were discussed and enjoyed by, among others, Amado Nervo, Luis G. Urbina, Ricardo Castro, Rafael Ángel de la Peña, and Ezequiel A. Chávez. After a period of professional practice he abandoned law to continue teaching and cultivating his knowledge of literature, having realised that as a humanist and a member of the Third Order of Saint Francis he could not agree with the harshness that his work required in some cases.

In 1904 he married Gabriela de la Torre in Mexico City. She was the daughter of a distinguished Tuxtlan who was the local deputy for Veracruz and political leader of the canton of Orizaba. Castellanos would affectionately call her Bella Gabriela (Beautiful Gabriela) all his life.

== National Preparatory School ==
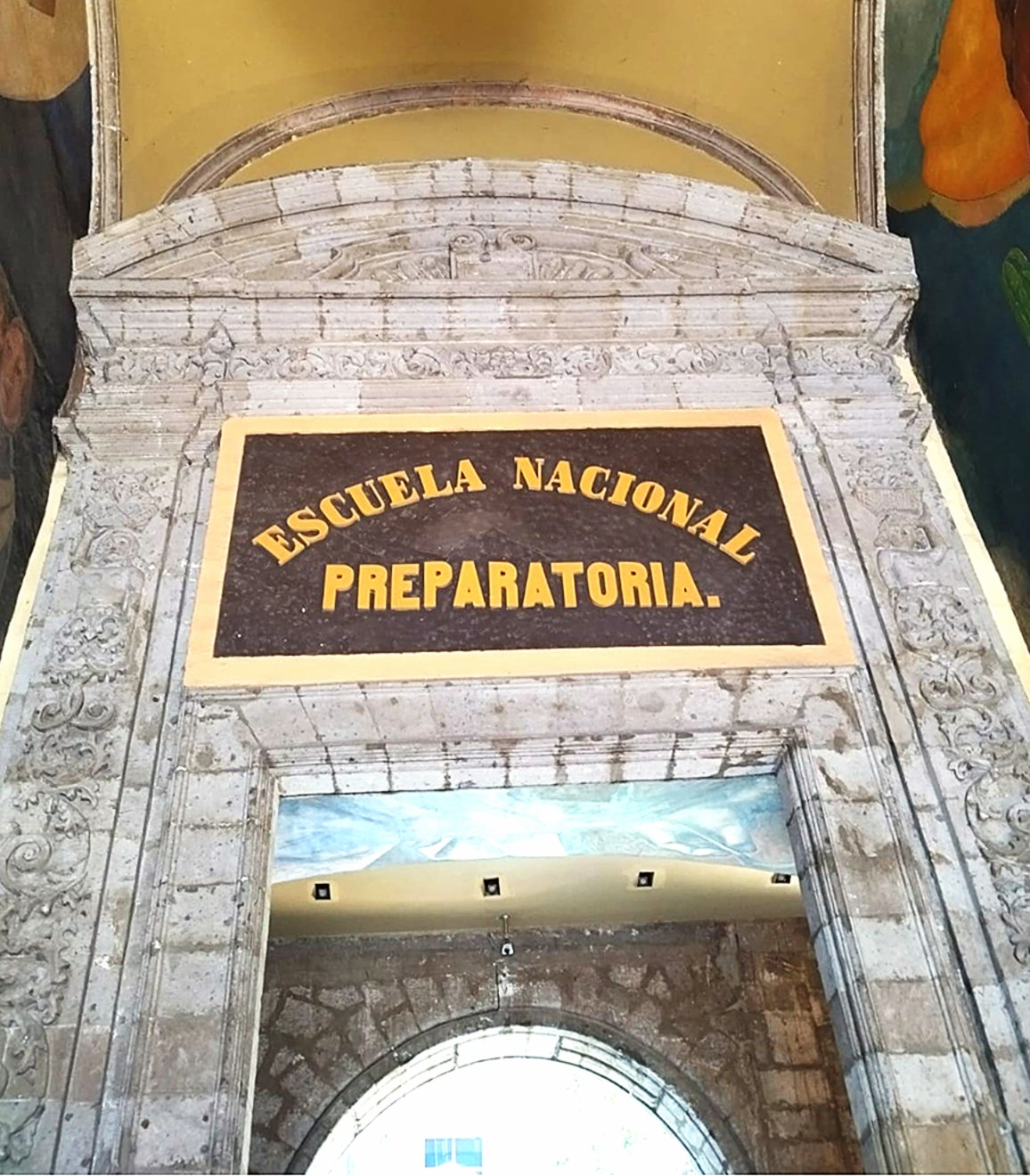
Sign at the entrance to the National Preparatory School when it was in the Antiguo Colegio de San Ildefonso

On July 31, 1906, Castellanos joined the teaching staff of the Escuela Nacional Preparatoria (the National Preparatory School, a senior high school) in Mexico City, then in the New Spain building Antiguo Colegio de San Ildefonso. Competing against the already prestigious intellectuals Ángel del Campo Valle (known as Micrós and TicTac), Luis G. Urbina, and Victoriano Salado Álvarez, amongst others, he won the position of assistant professor to the poet Amado Nervo, replacing him in the teaching of National Language when Nervo travelled on diplomatic or literary commitments. On August 7, 1906, Justo Sierra Méndez, the Minister of Education, congratulated Castellanos for having succeeded in the Spanish exam.

On July 1, 1907, Castellanos obtained tenure as an assistant professor, and in time he would become a full professor of Castilian Literature, General Literature, Selected Literary Productions Annotated Readings, and Masterpieces Analysis. On April 6, 1909 – with the agreement of Justo Sierra Mendez – Ezequiel A. Chávez appointed Castellanos as deputy director of the National Preparatory School until March 1, 1912. In 1910 Castellanos acted as interim director, temporarily replacing the famous positivist Porfirio Parra, and in 1912 he temporarily replaced Antonio Caso.

During the Mexican Revolution, the Aguascalientes Convention resulted in Villista and Zapatista armies occupying the Mexican capital. Castellanos was forced by Pancho Villa to take over the direction of the National Preparatory School on March 18, 1914 so that the school would not close. However, he was removed from that position on June 14, 1915 by the Convention government's Instruction Minister, engineer Félix Fulgencio Palavicini, "for not having behaved in a revolutionary manner during Victoriano Huerta's dictatorship" by continuing to teach his lessons.

Costellanos continued his distinguished teaching career at the National Preparatory School for almost fifty years up until his death, even in very difficult times socially and personally. For example, during the armed fighting of the Ten Tragic Days in Mexico City in February 1913, Castellanos continued teaching at the Preparatory School even though there might be few students or even no students in attendance, doing so without receiving payment and taking great pains to avoid bullets. He did the same in 1929 and 1930, when the Preparatory School's budget was reduced, leading to students successfully petitioning the university council to pay his salary and to reimburse him for unpaid wages. In 1947, on the day of his wife's death, he still showed up at the Preparatory School and taught his classes, knowing his students would be waiting for their teacher. "I could not leave unfinished the Iliad and Odyssey explanation, precisely, in the white cows and black cows passage", he is said to have exclaimed, taking off his bowler hat as a greeting to his stupefied students, who were only too aware of his grief.

== National School of Advanced Studies ==
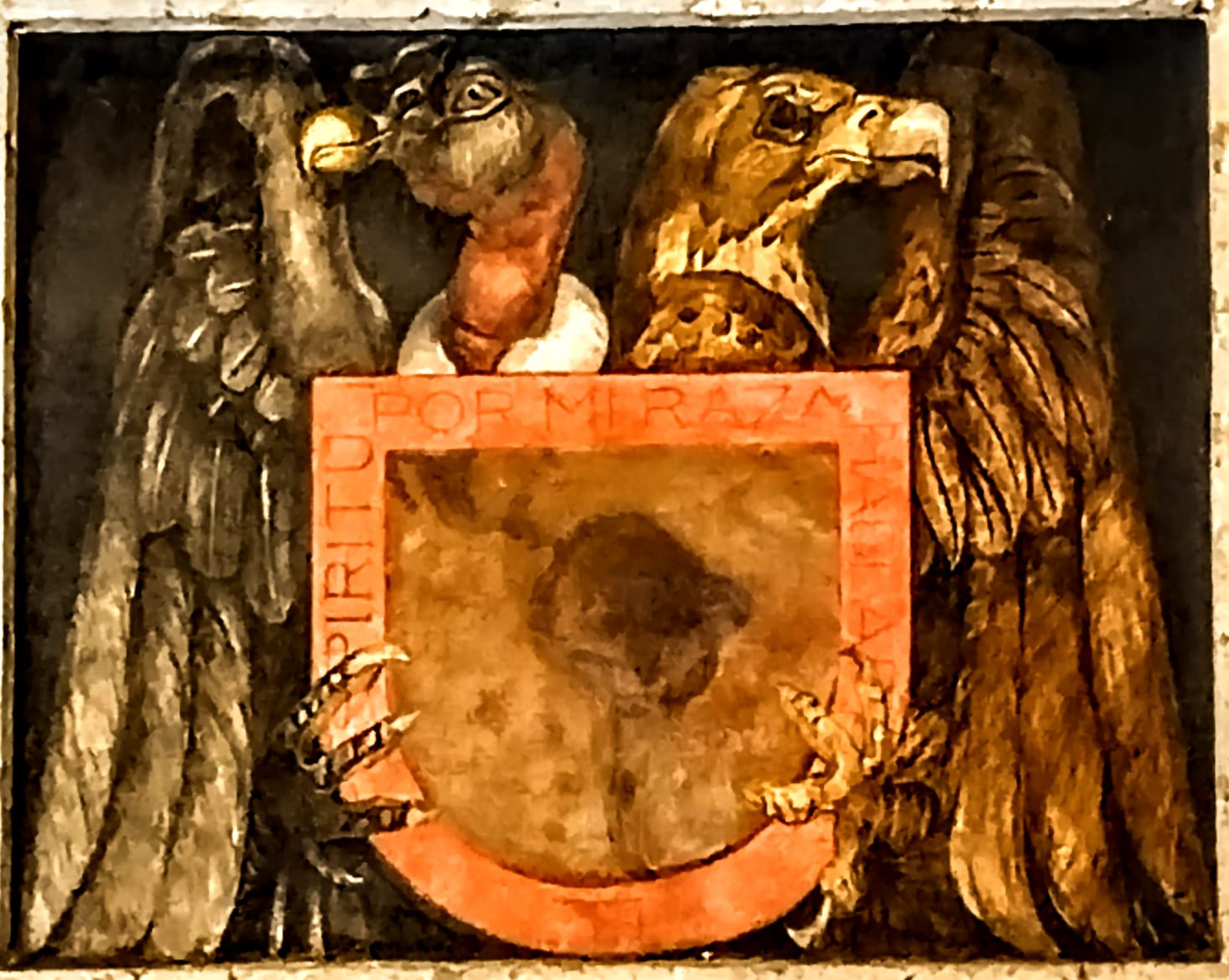
National Autonomous University of Mexico seal in the Antiguo Colegio de San Ildefonso. Mural painting attributed to Jean Charlot, 1923.

In 1922 Castellanos joined the Humanities Division (later the Philosophy and Letters Faculty) of the Escuela Nacional de Altos Estudios (National School of Advanced Studies) of the National University of Mexico, at that time on Licenciado Verdad Street in downtown Mexico City and later at the colonial Casa de los Mascarones. There he was a professor of Spanish Language and Literature, Cervantine Literature, and General Literature, including the Greek and Latin classics. He taught Spanish Language and Literature alongside Alfonso Reyes and Pedro Henríquez Ureña, and Spanish Literature and Cervantine Literature with Julio Jiménez Rueda and Eduardo Nicol. These classes continued until 1953, three academic years before his death.

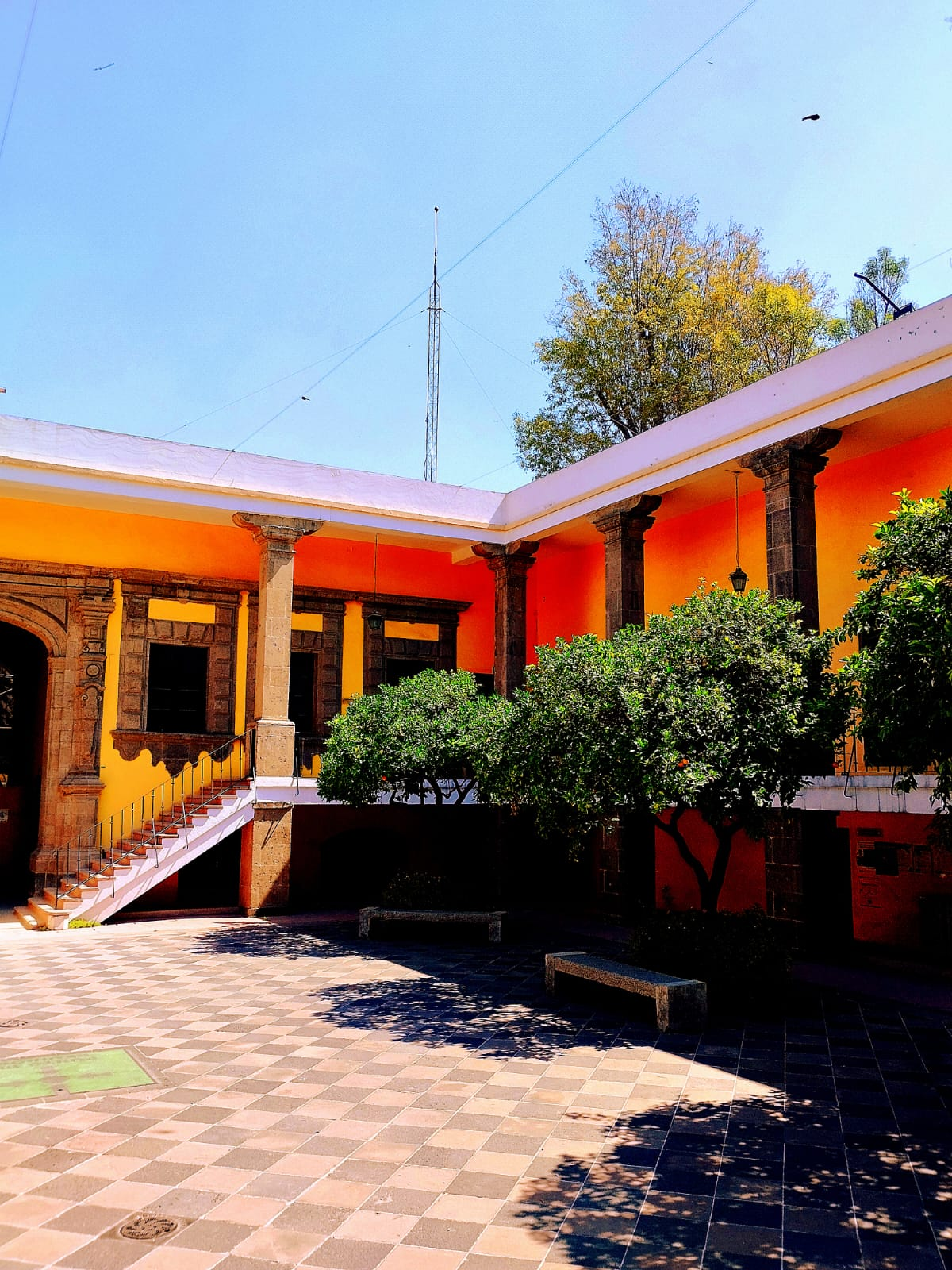
Casa de los Mascarones, where Castellanos taught his Cervantine Courses

His teaching style was distinct, as described by Álvaro Gálvez y Fuentes: "… Erasmo Castellanos walked from one end of the platform to the other, while explaining to his students in the Universal Literature class the inscrutable meaning of a Greek myth, from a page of the Iliad, or the symbolic value of each word and each image in a verse of The Divine Comedy. The teacher was an entertaining, thorough, and brilliant narrator, and many of his students thought that the Odyssey he told was better than the original text." Roberto Oropeza Martínez remembers how, "… the teacher's prodigious memory allowed him to reproduce any passage from Don Quixote, to the infinite amazement of those who listened to him. The Cervantine Literature courses he taught at the Philosophy and Letters Faculty for fifty-nine semesters, between 1922 and 1953, were always different – as he himself asserted – because 'the range of Cervantes studies is so broad ... that it could constitute a university degree in itself.'"

Many former students testify to the effect his teaching had on them, as Bernardo Claraval remembers: "[...] from the beginning, his course was oversaturated with students, attracting 150 or 200 young people who eagerly attended his wonderful explanations of the masterpieces that humanity has produced. […] He taught us to discern beauty and aesthetic values and even ethical ones […] He taught me that only a deep love of truth, goodness, and beauty can convey the aesthetic and human value of literary masterpieces. […] He taught me to have an open spirit to every current of truth." Or as Álvaro Gálvez y Fuentes observes: "He lived with an austerity bordering on poverty. More than once, his worn and frayed sleeves and trousers were for us, his students, a humble, silent lesson of those who dedicate their lives entirely to teaching and study. Because that dear, ineffable, marvellous Erasmo Castellanos did nothing else in his life but dedicate himself to learning and teaching. Perhaps for this reason, all of us his students always saw in him an example of selfless dedication to teaching."

== Personal habits ==
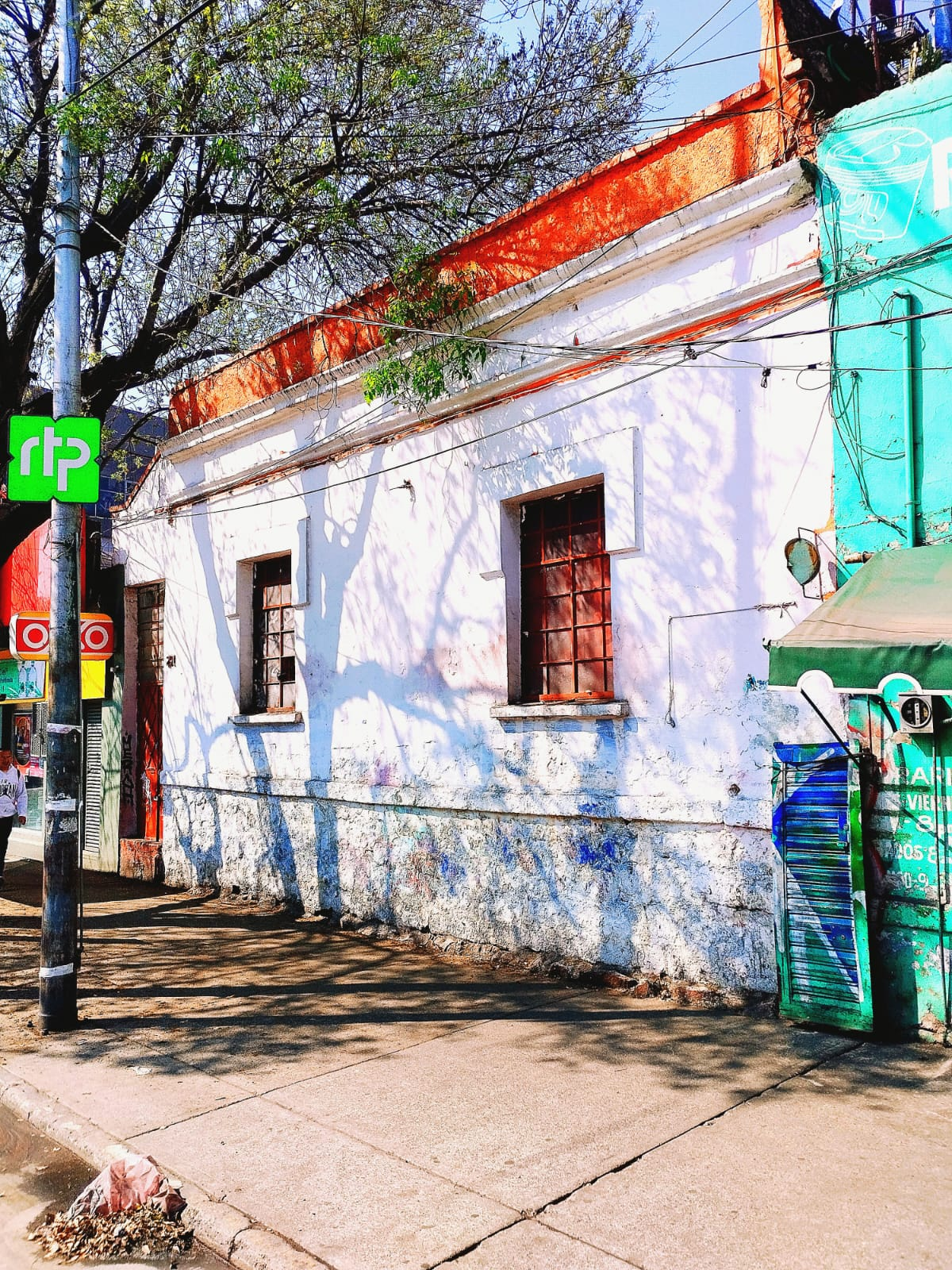
Rented house at Avenida Revolución 291, Tacubaya, Mexico City, where Castellanos lived until his death

Castellanos cut a unique figure at the school, as Ricardo Garibay describes: "He was an Old Testament inhabitant. Long grey hair grew from his sideburns and the nape of his neck; his beard and moustache were threadbare and almost white. [...] He was small and slightly hunchbacked. He wore a bowler hat, white sneakers, and a black, double-breasted suit with wide, long lapels, or another light grey one. He owned nothing else. He carried his books and notebooks in a burlap".

But as Garibay also points out, although the residents of the fierce Tacubaya neighbourhood where Castellanos lived revered him, "[a]t the University, the professors took great joy in mocking him. He suffered the mockery. He lived in terror of it." Leonardo Pasquel describes the paranoia this bullying led to: "... he assumed the person he was talking to was a spy from one of 'his many enemies' teachers, according to him bitter and scheming rivals who relentlessly did him untold harm [...] When a commotion occurred in class, his nerves were out of control, and the teacher [Castellanos] channelled his anxious thoughts through them, precipitating distrustful and suspicious attitudes. The persecution frenzy that strangled the core of his personality drove him to go off the deep end. Everything was – for him – his enemies' work... He found it difficult to distinguish between men kinds, and preferred to surround himself with dogs and cats, to receive their affection."

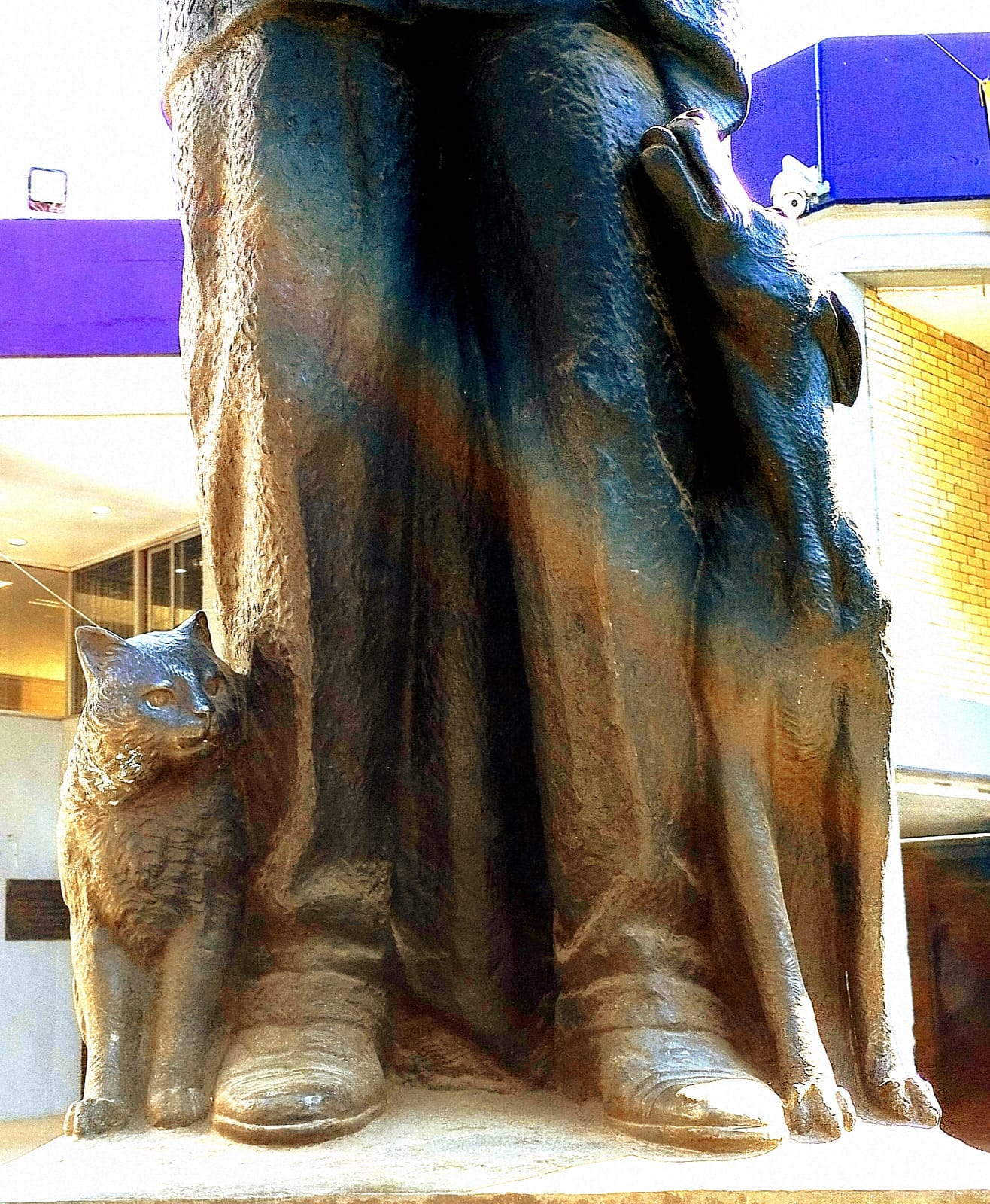
A stray dog and cat attached to Castellanos' legs in Ernesto Tamariz's statue of him

Castellanos had a great love of animals, especially dogs and cats. Garibay recounts how on Castellano's daily three or four-hour walks, "dogs were waiting for him at every corner. Groups of two, three, five, even eight dogs were waiting for him. All of them were scrawny, skin and bones, mangy, filthy. They smeared themselves on him, they climbed their paws on him, barked at him, jumped around him, licked him. He spoke to them, asked about their health and the dangers of the streets, and scolded them when they tried to snatch their rations. [...] And how suffered the man when he found one injured or visibly ill. There, in the street middle, heal it, feed it, talk to it, find it shelter."

Castellanos taught at the National School for the rest of his life, for as Oropeza Martínez points out: "Humble, modest, […] he didn't dare rise to the level due to his talents and natural fame; he was never diminished by obligatory homage, received honour, or lavished favour […] We saw him reject honours, medals and money, diplomas, cheers, seats, and perks […] Sometimes we blushed at his eagerness to appear small, when it came to mingling with foreign figures attracted by his prestigious chair. 'I am nobody... I don't deserve this... Your presence overwhelms me... I dare not speak... I give up my place to you... My students deserve to hear you...' were his favourite evasions."

== Academia Mexicana de la Lengua ==
Castellanos was a member of the Academia Mexicana de la Lengua (Mexican Academy of Language), an institution composed of Mexican professionals and intellectuals from diverse knowledge areas who are also Spanish language connoisseurs and scholars, in particular in the ways Spanish is spoken and written in Mexico. Castellanos was proposed and elected as a Corresponding Member at the assembly's December 28, 1919 session, and took up the position on March 20, 1920.

On July 4, 1928, he was elected a Full Member, occupying Chair VII. But after more than four years without delivering his formal acceptance speech, on January 4, 1933 the assembly agreed that Castellanos should resume his role as a Corresponding Member. The assembly instead elected the historian Mariano Cuevas SJ to occupy the full member's chair that Castellanos, not wanting to shine, abstained from taking, although he did actively participate in other activities and make speeches in other sessions.

Twenty-five years later he was again nominated and elected as a full member for his great literary knowledge and brilliance in Spanish language. This time he accepted, delivering his induction lecture on June 12, 1953 and occupying Chair XIX. Unfortunately, the Academy could not get his inaugural speech published.

== Ciudad Universitaria ==
In 1946, Castellano agreed to the request of his students Roberto Oropeza Martínez, Enrique Vázquez Domínguez, and Orlando Carrera to give a recital of his own poetry. All box office returns would go to the "Ten Million Campaign" raising funds for building the Ciudad Universitaria (University City) in Mexico City. The project was supported by the Mexico Cervantine Society and the recital was so successful that it was repeated three times. The last show was held at Mexico's main stage, the Palacio de Bellas Artes, and saw the professor and poet accompanied by voices and piano.

Although the new Ciudad Universitaria campus began operating in March 1954, Castellanos never taught there, having ceased to be a Faculty of Philosophy and Letters professor in 1953 because of his age.

== Death ==
Castellanos died at his home at 291 Avenida Revolución, Tacubaya, Mexico City just after three in the morning on December 11, 1955, supposedly after a health crisis brought on by an attempted eviction from his house for non-payment of rent. As Horacio Zuniga wrote at the time, "His funeral was far from being an event social and national and, fortunately, it was far from the foolish pomp and offensive sumptuousness [...]…over the tomb that only guards carrion." In keeping with his lifetime insistence on "not shining", at his death not even essential details of his life were known, and eulogists were reduced to recounting anecdotes from his life.

== Published works ==
Castellanos devoted his life to teaching and the study of great literature. Consequently, his printed work was limited, although this does not diminish its literary value. The following is what has survived.

Del Fondo del Abra (From the Bottom of the Opening). Lyrical poems, published and printed by Castellanos himself, Mexico, 1919. The prologue to the original edition was written by the humanist Luis G. Betancourt, a Latin literature professor at the Advanced Studies School of the National University of Mexico, and reveals that Castellanos was forced to publish this book of youth poems by his friends, who feared he would never have made them known otherwise. Castellanos wrote the Latin colophon "Typis editus ac perfectus apud auctorem. VIII Id. APR. Anno Dei MCMXIX. Carmen Foncerrada exornavit", meaning "Printed, published, and completed by the author. April 8, Lord's Year 1919. Carmen Foncerrada decorated it". This confirmed that the printing usually carried out by a printing or publishing house was done at home by himself on a manual printing press with the help of some of his students, and that the very beautiful titles and vignettes were done by the artist Carmen Foncerrada, resulting in a bibliographic gem. Castellanos gave a copy of the book with an autograph and dedication to Professor Milton Alexander Buchanan of the Italian and Spanish Department at the University of Toronto, and it is currently in the Robarts Library reserved collection there. Buchanan labelled that volume with his own Ex libris that says: "Keep as a precious jewel".

La Nueva Interpretación de las Siete Murallas del Noble Castillo del Limbo (The New Interpretation of the Limbo Noble Castle Seven Walls). Published and printed by Castellanos himself, Mexico, 1937. Eneas Rivas Castellano describes the book as a "work testimony to the deep knowledge Castellanos Quinto had about The Divine Comedy". Castellanos presents a well-founded interpretation not only of Dante Alighieri's work but also of his sources, focusing on the place immortals occupy in the distribution of rewards and punishments after life. (According to Dante, the Limbo Castle is the place where pagan immortals considered worthy of praise are kept.)

Poesía Inédita (Unpublished Poetry). A posthumous compilation by his loyal disciple and follower Roberto Oropeza Martínez, published by the Librería Porrúa, Mexico, 1962. In the prologue Oropeza explains that, "everything that was not included in the only poems book published by Erasmo Castellanos – Del Fondo del Abra – is gathered here." The poems were obtained from Castellanos' manuscripts provided to Oropeza by his relatives and others who were in charge of his few possessions, among them a portfolio in the possession of Castellano's student Campanella. Written throughout Castellano's years, Oropeza reports that, "Some [presented] with complete clarity and order but most of them [were] scattered across cards, notes on sheets of paper, and in many cases repeated in countless variations", making it a challenge for him to identify the final versions.

A los Cadetes de Chapultepec (To the Chapultepec Cadets). Poetry recited by Castellanos at the distribution of prizes and rewards to the students of the Colegio Militar de México on December 5, 1909, in the Chapultepec Forest monumental roundabout. The only existing copy of this eleven-page printout today is in the library of the University of Illinois at Urbana-Champaign.

== Awards ==
Mexican Cervantes Society Prize (1947): During the 400th anniversary of Cervantes' birth, Mexico's Cervantes Society held a competition for the best Cervantes research produced in the Americas, offering a diploma and 10,000 Mexican pesos as the prize. The call allowed for another person to submit the work of an author on her or his behalf, and so Castellanos' friend Francisco Pimentel entered "The Enchanters' Triumph" without Castellano's prior consent or knowledge. Forty-two texts were received, and the award ceremony took place at the Palacio de las Bellas Artes (Fine Arts Palace), attended by numerous intellectuals, academics, diplomatic representatives, and the public. Because it was one of his main fields of knowledge, Castellanos also attended. When his name was announced as the winner the acclaim was thunderous, but for Castellanos himself the situation was confusing, unexpected, and shocking. On stage he explained that he was sorry but he had not submitted any work, that obtaining that prize had not been and was not his wish, and that it should have been won by a young Cervantes scholar, not an elder like him. Despite many pleas, including from the poet Carlos Pellicer, he never accepted the prize, although since then he has been known as El Primer Cervantista de América ("America's First Cervantes Scholar").

Belisario Domínguez Medal of Honor (1954): An award created by the Mexican Senate in 1953 for Mexican women or men who have distinguished themselves as servants of the homeland or of humanity by their eminent science or virtue. In 1954, Castellanos was the first recipient, with the dedication saying, in part, "...we found the teacher Castellanos Quinto in one of the most modest homes in our country, surrounded by his friends, two or three venerable old men like himself, and four or five stray dogs he was able to save with his own help and with his professorship salary, so they wouldn't die of hunger. This selfless man, who didn't even have a suit suitable for appearing before the Senate; this wise Mexican man, deserving all our applause and all our respect, honours us with his presence."

National Autonomous University of Mexico Professors' Medal (1955): Awarded to Castellanos for his meritorious teaching and literary work a few days before his sudden death. Professor Rafael Cordero Amador, Castellanos' fellow scholar since 1922, reported that on presenting Castellano with the medal the elderly teacher said, "...with a soft, broken voice: 'Cordero Amador: Homer, Virgil, Horace, Dante, Shakespeare, and Cervantes are watching this scene from heaven', and tears rolled down his cheeks."

== Tributes ==
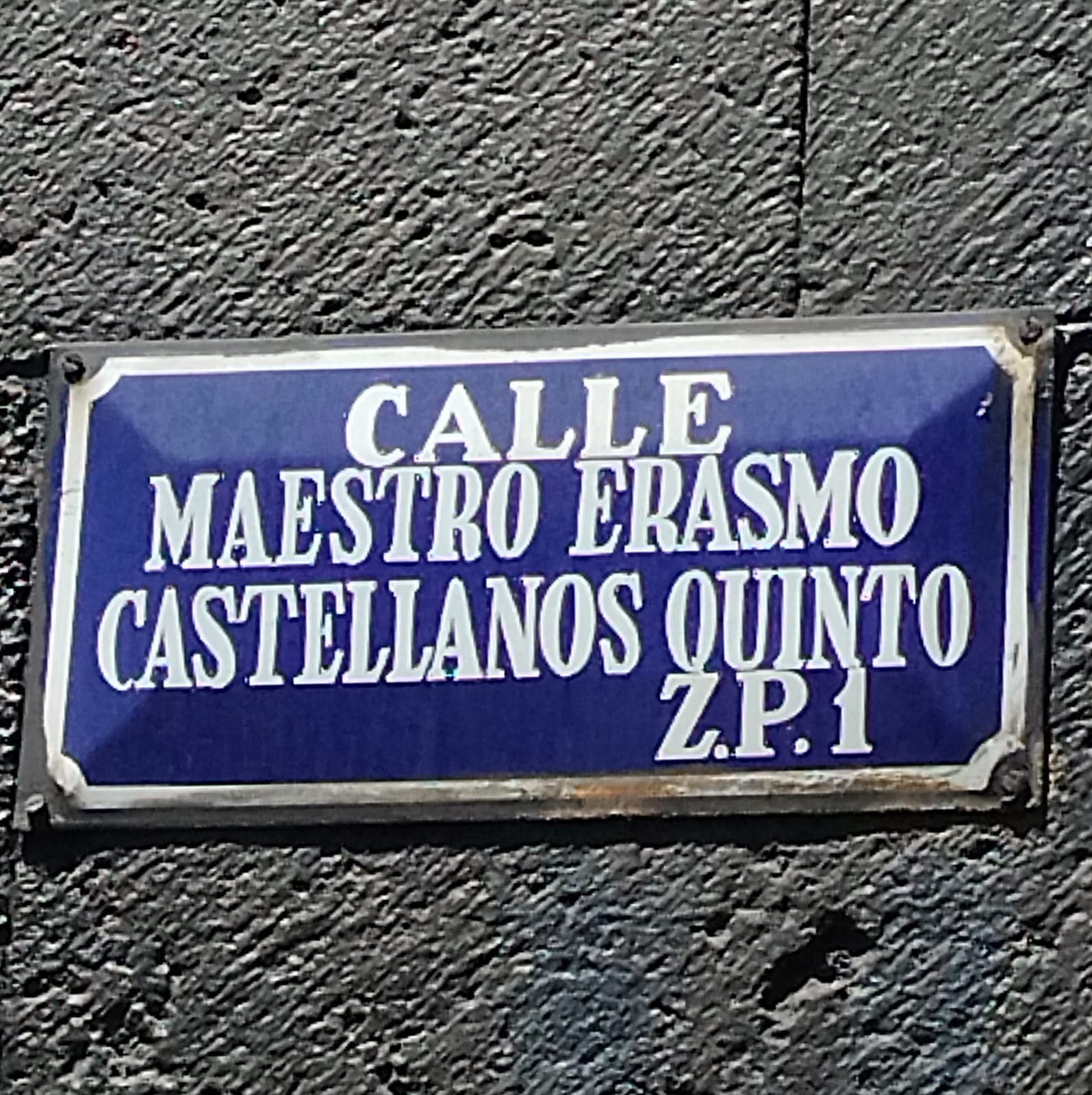
Erasmo Castellanos Quinto Street in downtown Mexico City

- On May 3, 1958, the Federal District Department of the Mexico City Government renamed the street previously called Calle de la Universidad ("University Street") after Castellanos.
- As part of the National Preparatory School's centennial celebrations on February 3, 1968, its Campus Number 2 building located at the intersection of Licenciado Verdad and República de Guatemala Streets in the historic centre of Mexico City was renamed the Erasmo Castellanos Quinto building. In 1978 it moved to new buildings at 1418 Río Churubusco Avenue, Carlos Zapata Vela Neighbourhood, Iztacalco Municipality, Mexico City, but still retained the professor's name.

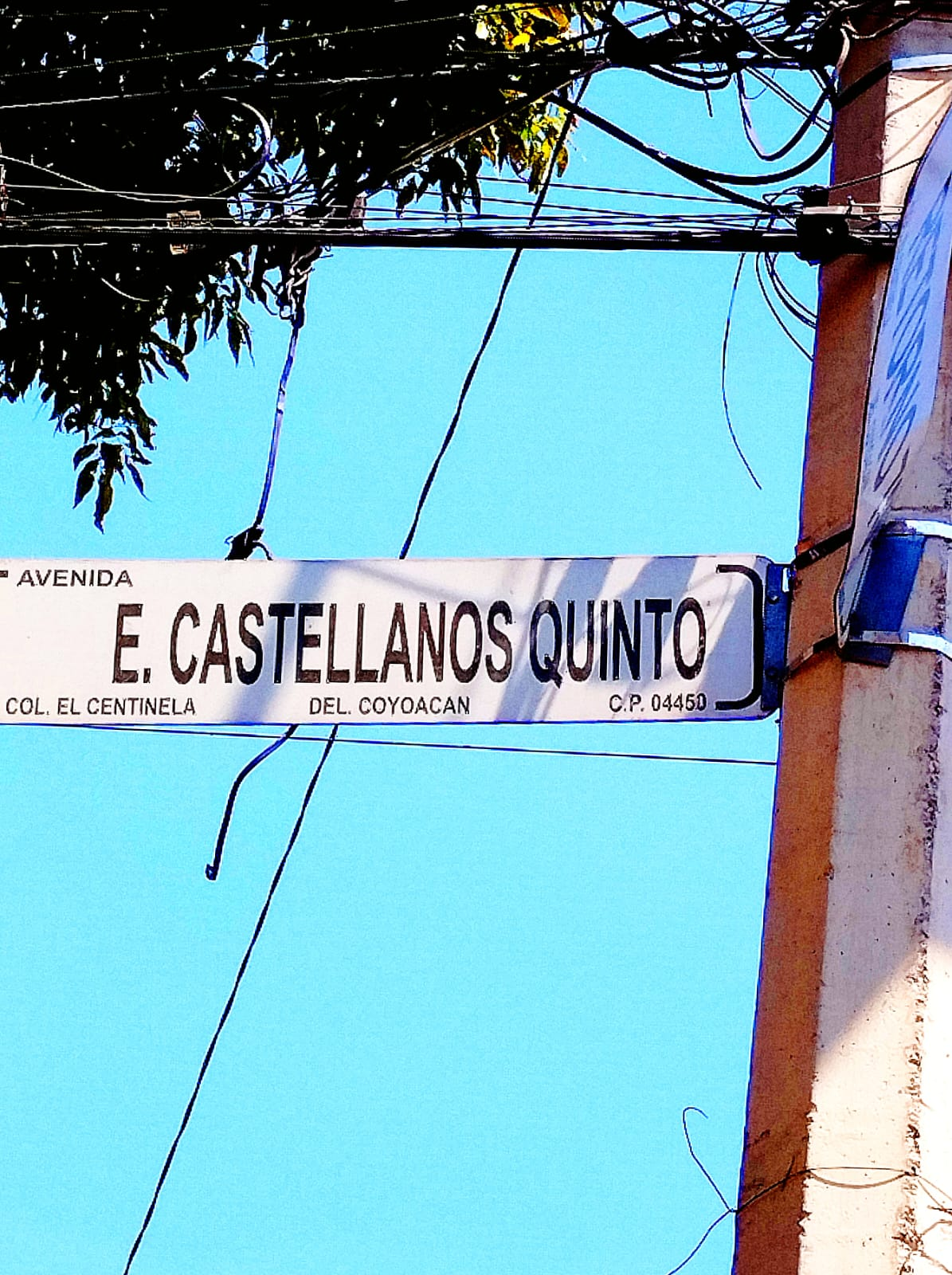
Erasmo Castellanos Quinto Avenue in El Centinela and Educación neighbourhoods, Coyoacán, Mexico City

- In 1975, on the 450th anniversary of the city of Veracruz's foundation, a sculpture of Castellanos by Humberto Peraza was erected at Plaza Cervantina in Santiago Tuxtla, Veracruz, Mexico.
- In 1993, a statue of Castellanos by Ernesto Tamariz originally erected in 1975 in the Plaza de Loreto in the Mexico City historic centre was moved to the Preparatory School No. 2 esplanade that bears his name. The monument is popularly known among students today as “The Erasmo", for being a reference point in their school.
- A sculpture of Castellanos donated by the State of Veracruz Government on Paseo de la Reforma Avenue near Peralvillo, Mexico City, was stolen on an unknown date, presumably for its bronze to be trafficked.
- An avenue in the El Centinela and Educación neighbourhoods of the Coyoacán borough in Mexico City was named after Castellanos.

There are also various kindergartens, primary schools, secondary schools, and libraries in Mexico that bear Castellanos' name.
