= Ignacio Soto =

Mexican politician

Ignacio Soto Martínez

13th Governor of Sonora
- In office September 1, 1949 – August 31, 1955
- Preceded by: Horacio Sobarzo
- Succeeded by: Álvaro Obregón Tapia

Personal details
- Born: May 12, 1890 Bavispe, Sonora, Mexico
- Died: July 28, 1962 (aged 72) Los Angeles, California, US
- Party: PRI
- Occupation: Businessman

Ignacio Soto Martínez (May 12, 1890 – July 28, 1962) was a Mexican politician. He was the Governor of Sonora from 1949 until 1955. Soto was a cement company executive prior to his time in government.
