= Emilio Lozoya Thalmann =

Mexican politician

Emilio Lozoya Thalmann (born 1948) is a Mexican economist and politician, member of the Institutional Revolutionary Party. He was Secretary of Energy during the government of Carlos Salinas de Gortari.

Emilio Lozoya graduated in Economics from the National Autonomous University of Mexico and holds a Master of Business Administration from Columbia University and a Master's in Public Administration from Harvard University.

At the outset of his government in 1988, Salinas appointed him as Director-General of the Institute for Social Security and Services for State Workers (ISSSTE), a position he held until 1993 when he was appointed Secretary of Energy, Mines and State Owned Industry, a post in which he ended the administration.

Emilio Lozoya Thalmann is the son of Jesús Lozoya Solís, a pediatric surgeon, politician, General in the Mexican Army and businessman, and the father of Emilio Lozoya Austin, former CEO of Pemex.
