= Confederación Revolucionaria de Obreros y Campesinos =

Mexican trade union confederation

The Confederación Revolucionaria de Obreros y Campesinos (CROC) is a Mexican trade union confederation. It is one of the most important and influential trade unions in the history of Mexico.

It was founded on 29 April 1952 during a congress organized by four national worker federations: National Proletariat Confederation, National Confederation of Mexican Workers and Campesinos, Only Workers Confederation, and National Confederation of Workers. Until 1980, the CROC had 750,000 workers in the union, in 17 of the 31 states and the Federal District (Mexico City); in 1980, the governing rules changed to rotate the presidency of the union each year, led by the Secretary General of the National Executive Committee (Secretario General del Comité Ejecutivo Nacional).

The CROC currently has 4.5 million worker members throughout 32 states as well as 17 National Industrial Confederations and 3,600 union locals with 15,000 collective contracts.
