= Rigoberto Aguilar Pico =

Politician and pediatrician of Sinaloa

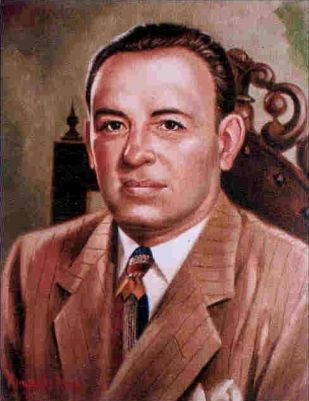
- Portrait of Rigoberto Aguilar Pico

Governor of Sinaloa
- In office January 1, 1953 – December 31, 1956
- Preceded by: Enrique Pérez Arce
- Succeeded by: Gabriel Leyva Velázquez

Personal details
- Born: June 1, 1905 Mazatlán
- Died: June 27, 1974 (aged 69) Mexico City
- Occupation: Politician; Pediatrician

Rigoberto Aguilar Pico (June 1, 1905 - June 27, 1974) was a Mexican politician and pediatrician. He completed his postgraduate studies in several European countries and the United States. He was a well-known pediatrician and founded the National Institute of Pediatrics. He had never been involved in politics, although it was said that he was a friend of Mr. Ángel Carvajal, who was secretary of the government. He was governor of Sinaloa, replacing Enrique Pérez Arce from 1953 to 1956. Upon taking office, he found that the state government was in serious financial trouble. During his government, a lot of emphasis was placed on health and education, since the Mexican Social Security Institute (IMSS) was established in Sinaloa with headquarters in Culiacán and 586 primary schools, 20 kindergartens and various types of educational institutions were built in the entire state. His administration's achievements included the expansion of the Children's Hospital in Culiacán, the building of the airport and the Rotonda of the Illustrious Persons of Sinaloa. He died in Mexico City on June 27, 1974.
