= Teófilo Borunda =

Mexican politician

Ambassasdor of Mexico to Argentina
- In office 1971–1972
- Preceded by: Bernardo Reyes Morales
- Succeeded by: Jaime Jiménez Muñoz

Governor of Chihuahua
- In office October 4, 1956 – October 3, 1962
- Preceded by: Jesús Lozoya Solís
- Succeeded by: Práxedes Giner Durán

President of the Chamber of Deputies of Mexico
- In office September 1, 1949 – September 30, 1951
- Preceded by: Braulio Maldonado Sández
- Succeeded by: Milton Castellanos Everardo

Member of the Senate of the Republic for Chihuahua
- In office September 1, 1952 – August 31, 1958

Member of the Chamber of Deputies for Chihuahua
- In office 1943–1952

Municipal President of Juárez
- In office January 1, 1940 – December 31, 1941
- Preceded by: Octavio Escobar Rodriguez
- Succeeded by: Antonio J. Bermúdez

Personal details
- Born: February 4, 1912 Satevó, Chihuahua
- Died: March 18, 2001 (aged 89) Ciudad Juárez, Chihuahua
- Party: PRI
- Spouse: Hortensia Flores

Teófilo Borunda Ortiz (February 4, 1912 in Satevó, Chihuahua – March 18, 2001 in Ciudad Juárez) was a Mexican politician, member of the Institutional Revolutionary Party, Governor of Chihuahua from 1956 to 1962, and was a senator and federal deputy.

The first public office that was chosen was that of municipal president of Juárez, from 1940 to 1941; he was also the founder of the National Confederation of Popular Organizations (CNOP) of the PRI in Ciudad Juarez at that time. Borunda served as federal deputy to the XXXIX legislature from 1943 to 1946; that same year he was designated as secretary general for Rodolfo Sánchez Taboada and then again served as federal deputy to the XLI legislature from 1949 to 1952. He was the President of the Chamber of Deputies in 1951. In 1952 he was chosen to represent the state of Chihuahua as a senator for until 1958, and was president of the senate during this time.

Before finishing his term as senator, in 1956 he was nominated by PRI then he was elected as governor of Chihuahua until 1962, during his government the railroad Chihuahua to Pacific was finished and he completed the channeling of the Río Chuviscar in its section that crosses the city of Chihuahua.

After he finished his governorship period he was named Manager of the COVE and subsequently Ambassador of Mexico in Argentina.

== See also ==
- 1956 Chihuahua state election

Preceded by Jesús Lozoya Solís	Governor of Chihuahua; 1956–1962	Succeeded by Práxedes Ginér Durán
