= Jesús Lozoya Solís =

Mexican politician (1910–1983)

Governor of Chihuahua
- In office 10 August 1955 – 3 October 1956
- Preceded by: Óscar Soto Maynez
- Succeeded by: Teófilo Borunda

Personal details
- Born: 31 March 1910 Parral, Chihuahua
- Died: 22 May 1983 (aged 73) Cocoyoc, Morelos
- Party: Institutional Revolutionary Party

Jesús Lozoya Solís (31 March 1910 – 22 May 1983) was a Mexican military physician, pediatrician and politician. He was interim Governor of Chihuahua between 1955 and 1956 after Óscar Soto Maynez lost control of the government. He was also director of the Hospital Central Militar. His sons are politician Emilio Lozoya Thalmann and physician Xavier Lozoya Legorreta.

Preceded by Óscar Soto Maynez	Governor of Chihuahua; 1955–1956	Succeeded by Teófilo Borunda
