= Ángel Carvajal Bernal =

Mexican politician

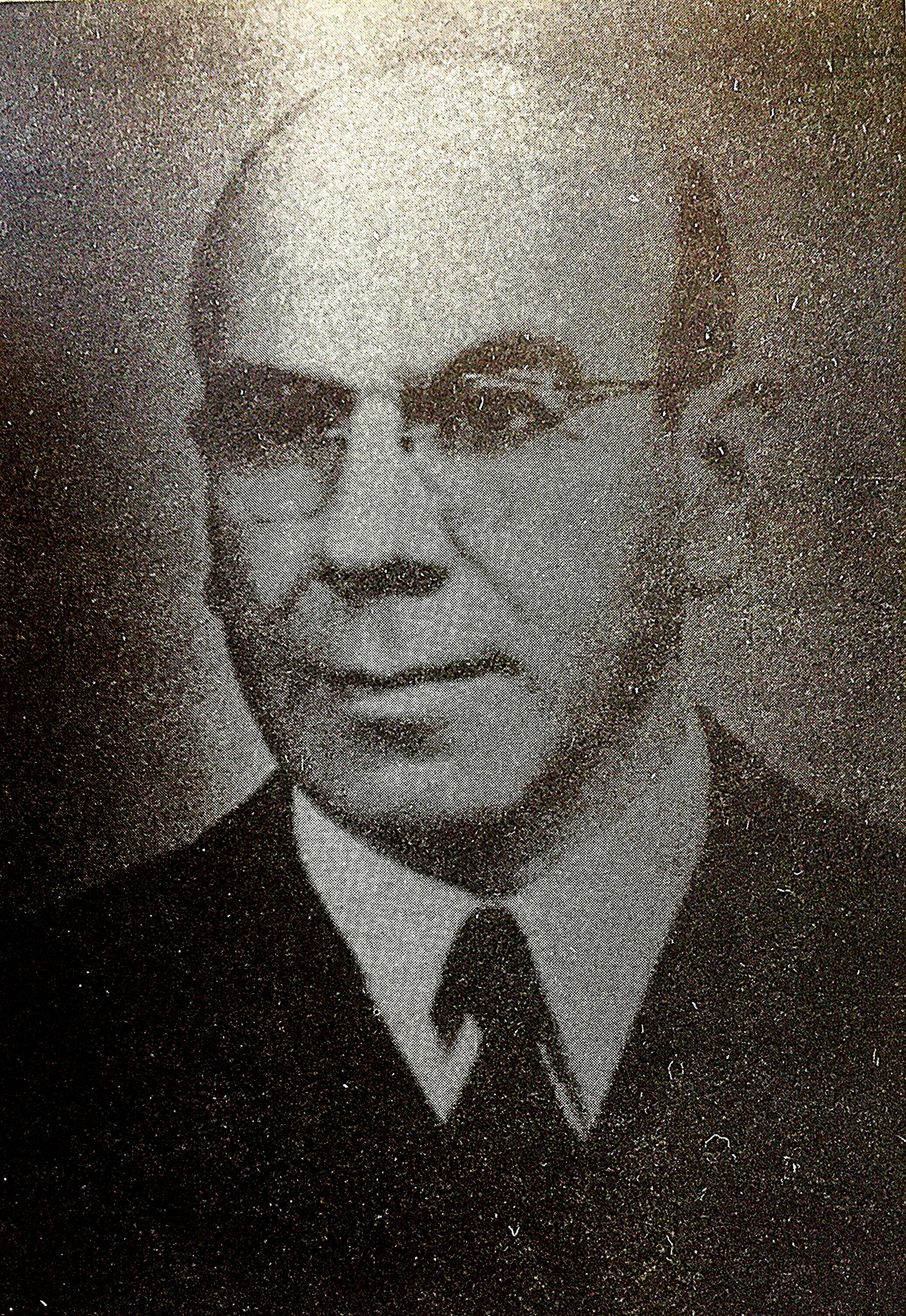

Ángel Carvajal Bernal (1901–1985) was a Mexican politician. He was governor of Veracruz between 1948 and 1950 and Secretary of the Interior from 1952 to 1958.
