= Agustín Yáñez =

Mexican writer and politician (1904–1980)

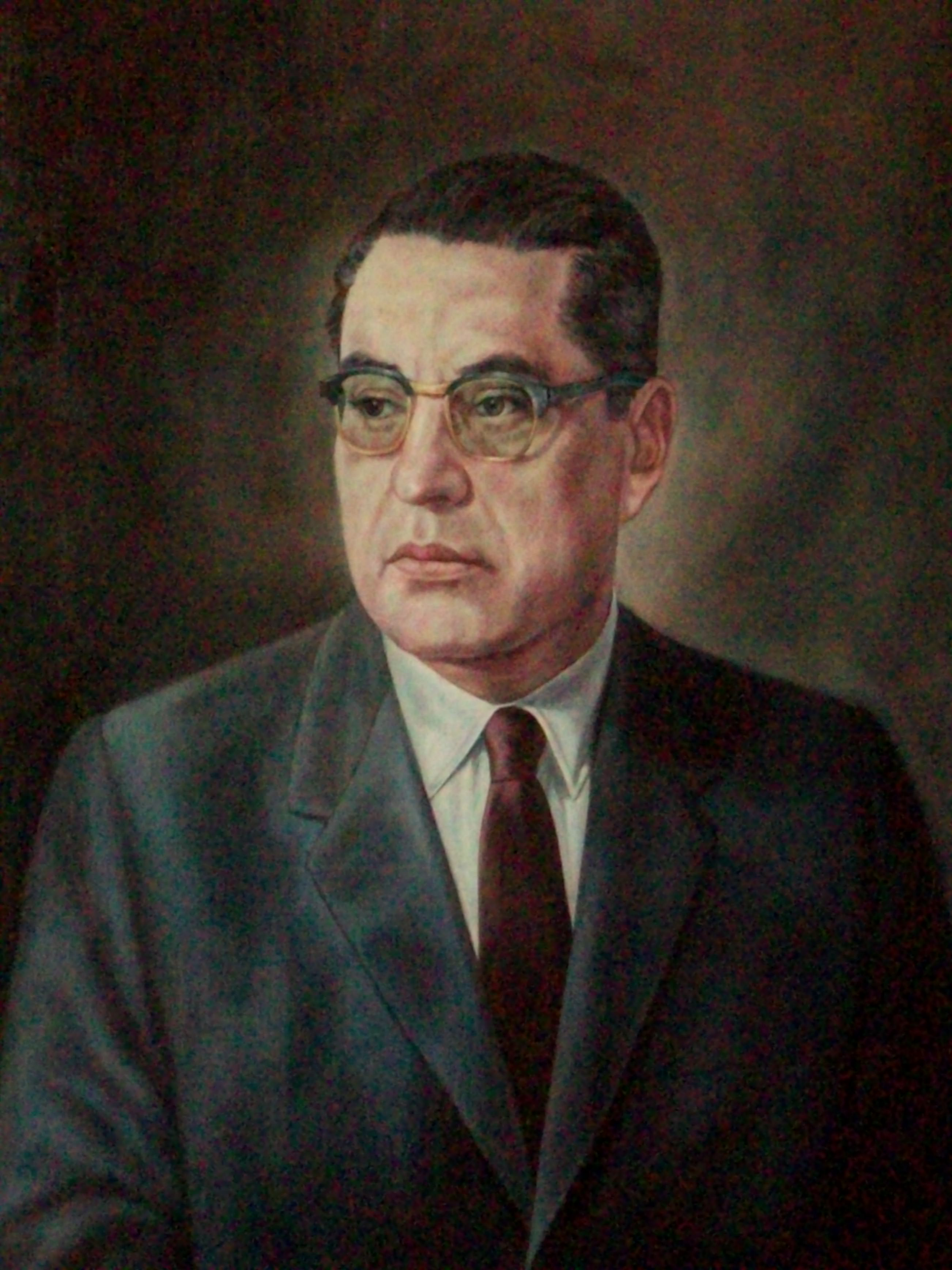
- Portrait of Agustín Yáñez in the Palacio de Gobierno, Guadalajara

Governor of Jalisco
- In office 1 March 1953 – 28 February 1959
- Preceded by: José Jesús González Gallo
- Succeeded by: Juan Gil Preciado

Secretary of Public Education
- In office 1 December 1964 – 30 November 1970
- President: Gustavo Díaz Ordaz
- Preceded by: Jaime Torres Bodet
- Succeeded by: Víctor Bravo Ahuja

Personal details
- Born: 4 May 1904 Guadalajara, Jalisco, Mexico
- Died: 17 January 1980 (aged 75) Mexico City, D.F., Mexico
- Resting place: Panteón de Dolores
- Party: Institutional Revolutionary Party
- Education: University of Guadalajara; National Autonomous University of Mexico

Agustín Yáñez Delgadillo (May 4, 1904 in Guadalajara, Jalisco – January 17, 1980 in Mexico City) was a Mexican writer and politician who served as Governor of Jalisco and Secretary of Public Education during Gustavo Díaz Ordaz's presidency. He is the author of numerous books and the recipient, in 1952 as member of the Academia Mexicana de la Lengua, in 1973, of the Premio Nacional de las Letras. Al filo del agua (On the Edge of the Storm) is considered his most important work, according to the Encyclopedia of Latin American and Caribbean literature, 1900-2003 By Daniel Balderston, Mike Gonzalez, page 616.

== Education and teaching profession ==
Yáñez studied law in the Escuela de Jurisprudencia de Guadalajara and philosophy in the National Autonomous University of Mexico (UNAM). He held several teaching positions throughout his life, he was a professor in the Escuela Normal para Señoritas de Guadalajara from 1923 to 1929, in the Preparatoria José Paz Camacho from 1926 to 1929, in the Preparatoria de la Universidad de Guadalajara from 1931 to 1932, in the Escuela Nacional Preparatoria from 1932 to 1953, in the UNAM from 1942 to 1953 and again from 1959 to 1962. He entered El Colegio Nacional in 1952.

== Writings ==
=== Essays ===
- Fray Barlolomé de las Casas, el conquistador conquistado (1942)
- El contenido social de la literatura iberoamericana (1943)
- Alfonso Gutiérrez Hermosillo y algunos amigos (1945)
- El clima espiritual de Jalisco (1945)
- Fichas mexicanas (1945)
- Yahualica (1946)
- Discursos por Jalisco (1958)
- La formación política (1962)
- Moralistas franceses (1962)
- Proyección universal de México (1963)
- Días de Bali (1964)
- Conciencia de la revolución (1964)
- Dante, concepción integral del hombre y de la historia (1965)
- Discursos al servicio de la educación pública (1964,1965,1966)

=== Short stories ===
- Por tierras de Nueva Galicia (1928)
- Baralipton (1931)
- Espejismo de Juchitán (1940)
- Genio y figuras de Guadalajara (1941)
- Flor de juegos antiguos (1942)
- Esta es mala suerte (1945)
- Melibea, Isolda y Alda en tierras cálidas (1946)
- Los sentidos del aire, Episodios de Navidad (1948)
- Tres cuentos (1964)

=== Novels ===
- Archipiélago de mujeres (1943)
- Pasión y convalecencia (1943)
- Al filo del agua (1947)
- La creación (1959)
- La tierra pfoparga (1960)
- Ojerosa y pintada (1960)
- Las tierras flacas (1962)
- Perseverancia final (1967)
- Las vueltas del tiempo (1973)
- La ladera dorada (1978)
- Santa Anna, espectro de una sociedad (1981 concluded AD)

== Political career ==
Agustín Yáñez was a member of the Institutional Revolutionary Party (PRI). He served as Governor of Jalisco from 1953 to 1959, undersecretary of the President of the Republic from 1962 to 1964 and Secretary of Public Education from 1964 to 1970. He headed the Mexican delegation to UNESCO's 11th general assembly in 1960.

== See also ==
- Statue of Agustín Yáñez
- Yahualica de González Gallo
