= Juan C. Gorraéz =

Mexican politician

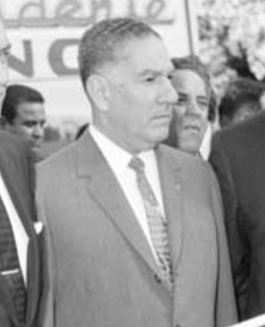
Image of Juan Gorraéz

Juan Crisóstomo Gorráez Maldonado (27 January 1904 – 10 September 1988) was a Mexican lawyer and politician who served as Governor of Querétaro from 1955 to 1961.

== Biography ==
He was born in the city of Queretaro on 27 January 1904. In high school, he was representative of the student society and contributor to the magazine of such a body. He graduated with a degree in Law at the UNAM in 1928, where he was a classmate of Miguel Alemán, future president of Mexico. He first worked in criminal courts and then in the Ministry of Labor climbed several positions until becoming head of the Central Board of Conciliation and Arbitration.

== Governor ==
In 1955 he was elected governor. During his administration they were extended or created several roads, including the short road to Mexico City (now the Federal Highway 57 share). In Queretaro City Health Center and the Casa de la Juventud they were created and neglect rescued two historical monuments: the Mausoleum of the magistrate and the Teatro de la República.

In 1958, Governor Gorráez, as a member of the Academic Council, faced the strike at the University of Queretaro for the appointment of a new rector, in which they did not agree neither students nor teachers. The government and the university agreed to university autonomy as the best solution. Since 5 February 1959, the Autonomous University of Queretaro makes decisions without the intervention of the state governor.

In 1961, a serious illness withdrew its functions, but not from office, the governor Gorráez. He was in charge of the firm Manuel M. Vega. For three months Gorráez hovered between life and death. He restored his health, returned to their tasks and read his latest report only partially.

== Other related ==
He concluded his administration, from 1963 to 1975 he was a judge of the Superior Court of the District and Federal Territories and counsel IMSS 1975–1985.

In 1987, Gorráez lies in the city of Mexico, continually visiting Queretaro, the city where he was born and ruled.

== Death ==
He died in Mexico City on 10 September 1988 at age 84; his remains rest in the Church of the Covedonga in Mexico City.
