= Governor of Sonora =

List of governors of the Mexican state of Sonora

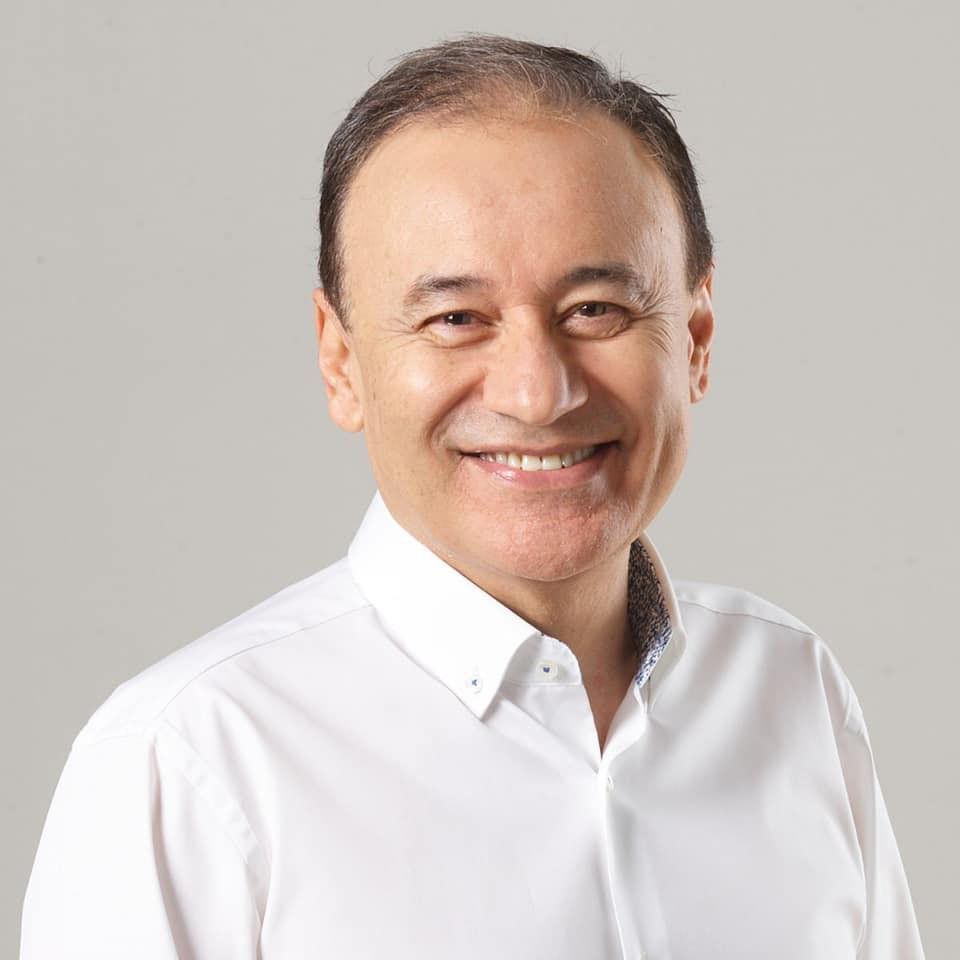
- Incumbent; Alfonso Durazo since September 13, 2021
- Residence: Hermosillo
- Term length: 6 years

List of governors of the Mexican state of Sonora since 1911:

- 2021–present Alfonso Durazo MORENA
- 2015–2021 Claudia Pavlovich Arellano PRI
- 2009–2015 Guillermo Padrés Elías PAN (Note: Since October 2016, Guillermo Padrés has officially been declared a criminal by the Mexican government and is currently considered to be a criminal on the run with his whereabouts unknown. The PAN apologized for supporting him and expelled him for their political party.)
- 2003–2009 Eduardo Bours Castelo PRI
- 1997–2003 Armando López Nogales PRI
- 1991–1997 Manlio Fabio Beltrones Rivera PRI
- 1991–1991 Mario Morúa Johnson
- 1985–1991 Rodolfo Félix Valdés PRI
- 1979–1985 Samuel Ocaña García PRI
- 1975–1979 Alejandro Carrillo Marcor PRI
- 1973–1975 Carlos Armando Biebrich Torres PRI
- 1967–1973 Faustino Félix Serna PRI
- 1961–1967 Luis Encinas Johnson PRI
- 1955–1961 Álvaro Obregón Tapia PRI
- 1949–1955 Ignacio Soto PRI
- 1948–1949 Horacio Sobarzo PRI
- 1943–1948 Abelardo L. Rodríguez, Party of the Mexican Revolution, PRM
- 1939–1943 Anselmo Macías Valenzuela, PRM
- 1937–1939 Román Yocupicio Valenzuela, National Revolutionary Party, PNR
- 1935–1937 Ramón Ramos, PNR
- 1931–1935 Rodolfo Elías Calles, PNR
- 1929–1931 Francisco S. Elías, PNR
- 1927–1929 Fausto Topete
- 1923–1927 Alejo Bay
- 1919–1923 Adolfo de la Huerta
- 1915–1919 Plutarco Elías Calles
- 1911–1915 José María Maytorena

== See also ==
- List of current state governors in Mexico
- Politics of Mexico
