= Álvaro Obregón Tapia =

Mexican politician

Álvaro Obregón Tapia (18 December 1916—27 September 1993) was a Mexican political figure who served as governor of the northwestern border state of Sonora from 1955 to 1961. He was a son of Álvaro Obregón Salido and María Tapia Monteverde. Obregón Tapia's father was a brilliant Sonoran general in the Mexican Revolution, who became president of Mexico in 1920, re-elected in 1928, but assassinated before he could take office. Obregón Tapia's birth in 1916 was after his father's defeat of Pancho Villa in 1915 in the Battle of Celaya, a decisive victory for the Constitutionalists.

As with some offspring of other revolutionary leaders, such as Lázaro Cárdenas's son Cuauhtémoc Cárdenas, Obregón Tapia pursued a political career via the Institutional Revolutionary Party. That party was founded in 1929 following the assassination of Obregón Tapia's father and became the dominant political party in Mexico. During his term in office, Obregón Tapia stressed the importance of education to the future growth of Sonora and the country as a whole and demonstrated his commitment by overseeing the construction of 139, primarily rural, schools and places of learning, and instituting a program of night classes for adults. He also greatly expanded the state's highway system.

Álvaro Obregón Tapia had been undergoing treatment at a Tucson hospital in the U.S. state of Arizona, which has a wide border with Sonora. He died there at age 76.
