= 3rd federal electoral district of Baja California =

Federal electoral district of Mexico

Baja California's 3rd
- Electoral district of the Chamber of Deputies of Mexico

Incumbent
- Member: Claudia Moreno Ramírez
- Party: ▌Morena
- Congress: 66th (2024–2027)

District
- State: Baja California
- Head town: Ensenada
- Coordinates: 31°51′N 116°36′W
- Covers: Ensenada (part), San Quintín
- PR region: First
- Precincts: 194
- Population: 408,150 (2020 census)

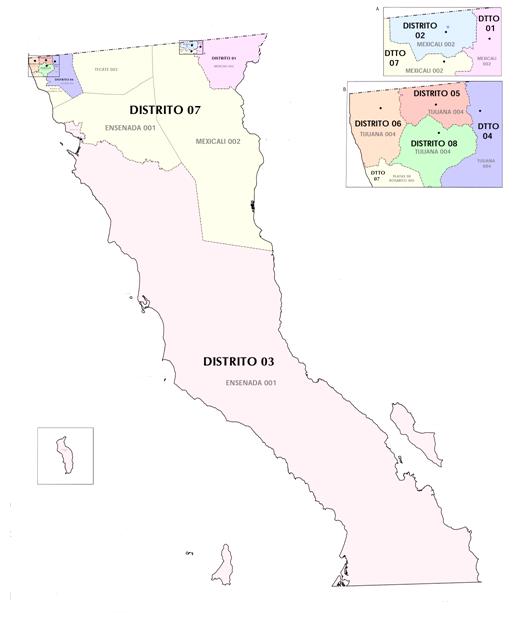
Baja California under the 2017–2022 districting scheme

Baja California's districts between 2005 and 2007

The 3rd federal electoral district of Baja California (Spanish: Distrito electoral federal 03 de Baja California) is one of the 300 electoral districts into which Mexico is divided for elections to the federal Chamber of Deputies and one of nine such districts in the state of Baja California.

It elects one deputy to the lower house of Congress for each three-year legislative session by means of the first-past-the-post system. Votes cast in the district also count towards the calculation of proportional representation ("plurinominal") deputies elected from the first region.

The current member for the district, elected in the 2024 general election, is Claudia Moreno Ramírez of the National Regeneration Movement (Morena).

== District territory ==
Under the 2023 districting plan adopted by the National Electoral Institute (INE), which is to be used for the 2024, 2027 and 2030 federal elections, the 3rd district covers 194 precincts (secciones electorales) in the southern portion of the municipality of Ensenada and the whole of the municipality of San Quintín.

The head town (cabecera distrital), where results from individual polling stations are gathered together and tallied, is the city of Ensenada. The district reported a population of 408,150 in the 2020 census.

== Previous districting schemes ==
Evolution of electoral district numbers
	1974	1978	1996	2005	2017	2023
Baja California	3	6	6	8	8	9
Chamber of Deputies	196	300				

2005–2017

It covered the southern section of the state of Baja California, with the coastal city of Ensenada representing a major population center. The 3rd district was the largest in the state.

1995–2005

Between 1996 and 2005, the district's territory was made up entirely by the municipalities of Ensenada, Tecate, and Playas de Rosarito.

== Deputies returned to Congress ==
(Mexico) National parties
- Current
- PAN
- PRI
- PT
- PVEM
- MC
- Morena
- PAZ
- Somos
- Defunct or local only
- PLM
- PNR
- PRM
- PNM
- PP
- PPS
- PARM
- PFCRN
- CON
- PANAL
- PSD
- PES
- PES
- PRD

Baja California's 3rd district
Election	Deputy	Party	Term	Legislature
1961	Luis González Ocampo; Quintín Hurtado Olivares (Note: Hurtado Olivares assumed as the alternate on 13 November 1962, following the death of González Ocampo.)	Institutional Revolutionary Party	1961–1962; 1962–1964	45th Congress
1964	Salvador Rosas Magallón	Institutional Revolutionary Party	1964–1967	46th Congress
1967	Celestino Salcedo Monteón	Institutional Revolutionary Party	1967–1970	47th Congress
1970	Alfonso Garzón Santibáñez	Institutional Revolutionary Party	1970–1973	48th Congress
1973	Celestino Salcedo Monteón	Institutional Revolutionary Party	1973–1976	49th Congress
1976	Alfonso Garzón Santibáñez	Institutional Revolutionary Party	1976–1979	50th Congress
1979	Luis Ayala García	Institutional Revolutionary Party	1979–1982	51st Congress
1982	José Luis Castro Verduzco	Institutional Revolutionary Party	1982–1985	52nd Congress
1985	Enrique Pelayo Torres	Institutional Revolutionary Party	1985–1988	53rd Congress
1988	Luis González Ruiz	Institutional Revolutionary Party	1988–1991	54th Congress
1991	Rogelio Appel Chacón	Institutional Revolutionary Party	1991–1994	55th Congress
1994	Daniel Quintero Peña	Institutional Revolutionary Party	1994–1997	56th Congress
1997	Francisco Vera González	National Action Party (Mexico)	1997–2000	57th Congress
2000	Hugo Zepeda Barrelleza	National Action Party (Mexico)	2000–2003	58th Congress
2003	Pablo Alejo López Núñez	National Action Party (Mexico)	2003–2006	59th Congress
2006	Héctor Manuel Ramos Covarrubias	National Action Party (Mexico)	2006–2009	60th Congress
2009	César Mancillas Amador	National Action Party (Mexico)	2009–2012	61st Congress
2012	Gilberto Hirata	Institutional Revolutionary Party	2012–2015	62nd Congress
2015	Wenceslao Martínez Santos	National Action Party (Mexico)	2015–2018	63rd Congress
2018	Armando Reyes Ledesma	Labor Party (Mexico)	2018–2021	64th Congress
2021	Armando Reyes Ledesma	Labor Party (Mexico)	2021–2024	65th Congress
2024	Claudia Moreno Ramírez	National Regeneration Movement	2024–2027	66th Congress

== Presidential elections ==
Baja California's 3rd district
Election	District won by	Party or coalition	%
2018	Andrés Manuel López Obrador	Juntos Haremos Historia	62.9246
2024	Claudia Sheinbaum Pardo	Sigamos Haciendo Historia	66.8119

== See also ==
- Federal electoral districts of Mexico
