= 2007 Baja California state election =

Local election in Mexico

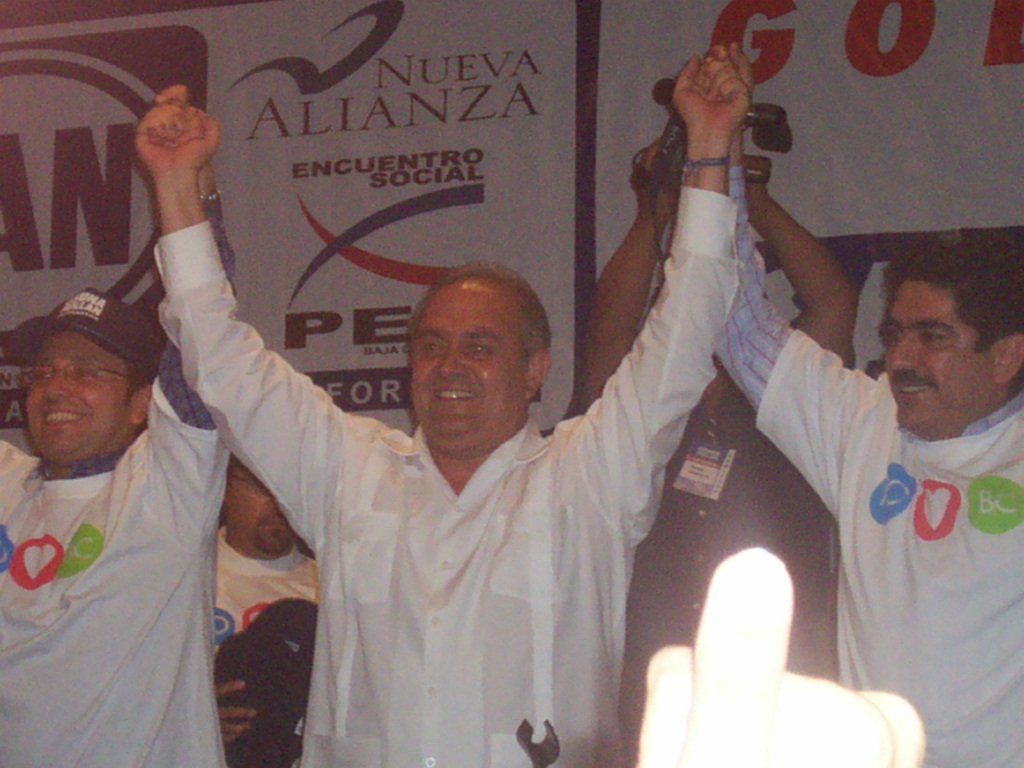
José Guadalupe Osuna Millán is proclamated winning candidate

Local elections were held in the Mexican State of Baja California on Sunday, August 5, 2007. According to the preliminary results program, José Guadalupe Osuna Millán of the Alliance for Baja California (APBC) was elected governor by a 7% margin over candidate Jorge Hank Rohn of the Alliance for a Better Life (APVM). Results for APBC in municipalities and congressional seats were better than expected including victory for mayor of Tijuana which Jorge Hank Rohn's occupied previous to the electoral campaign.

The ruling party (National Action Party) had attempted to move the date to June as part of an electoral reform, but the Supreme Court determined that such reforms were "a serious violation to the legislative process" since the reforms were approved with "no previous discussion and analysis". Also, the local council members belonging to the PAN voted against granting permission to Jorge Hank from leaving his post as municipal president and accepting a nomination as candidate for the Institutional Revolutionary Party the same day the State Electoral Institute rejected the PAN's petition to form an electoral alliance. The Party of the Democratic Revolution did not reach an agreement to form an alliance with the Labor Party and Convergence

Voters will go to the polls to elect, on the local level:

- A new Governor of Baja California to serve for a six-year term.
- Five municipal presidents (mayors) to serve for a three-year term.
- 25 local deputies (16 by the first-past-the-post system and nine by proportional representation) to serve for a three-year term in the Congress of Baja California.

== Gubernatorial election ==
Ten political parties will participate in the 2007 Baja California State election.

=== Official results ===
Party/Alliance	Candidate	Votes	Percent
Alianza por Baja California (PAN, PANAL, PES)	José Guadalupe Osuna Millán	436,460	50.44
Alianza para que Vivas Mejor (PRI, PVEM, PEBC)	Jorge Hank	380,772	44.00
Party of the Democratic Revolution	Jaime Enrique Hurtado de Mendoza	20,003	2.31
Social Democratic Alternative Party	Carmen García Montaño	7,738	0.89
Alianza Convergencia-PT; PT - Convergencia	María Mercedes Maciel Ortiz	6,749	0.78
None		13,742	1.59
Total		865,364	100.00

Source: IEEBC website

=== Preliminary results ===
Party/Alliance	Candidate	Votes	Percent
Alianza por Baja California (PAN, PANAL, PES)	José Guadalupe Osuna Millán	399,645	50.57
Alianza para que Vivas Mejor (PRI, PVEM, PEBC)	Jorge Hank	345,314	43.70
Party of the Democratic Revolution	Jaime Enrique Hurtado de Mendoza	18,511	2.34
Social Democratic Alternative Party	Carmen García Montaño	7,192	0.91
Alianza Convergencia-PT; PT - Convergencia	Maria Mercedes Maciel Ortiz	6,276	0.79
None		13,272	1.68
Total		790,210	100.00

Source: PREP

== Municipal election ==
The five municipalities will choose their municipal president.

Party/Alliance	Ensenada candidate	Mexicali candidate	Playas de Rosarito candidate	Tecate candidate	Tijuana candidate
Alianza por Baja California (PAN, PANAL, PES)	Pablo Alejo López Núñez	Rodolfo Valdéz Gutiérrez	Ignacio García Dwórak	Donaldo Peñaloza	Jorge Ramos Hernández
Alianza para que Vivas Mejor (PRI, PVEM, PEBC)	Jaime Palafox Granados	Joaquín Ramírez Chacón	Hugo Torres Chabert	César Moreno Martínez	Fernando del Monte
Party of the Democratic Revolution	Carlos Hafen López	Juan Carlos Ruiz Rubio	Jorge Luis Quiñónez Leyva	José Lara García	Jaime Martínez Veloz
Social Democratic and Farmer Alternative	Marco Antonio Delgadillo Villanueva	Oscar Hernández Valenzuela	Sergio Ortiz Luna	Rafael Miravete Basáñez	Silke de la Parra
Alianza Convergencia-PT; PT - Convergencia	Gabino Ramírez Huerta	Sandra Torres Sánchez	Iván Peñaloza Cruz	Alfonso Barona García	Jesús Ignacio Carlos Huerta

=== Ensenada ===
Party/Alliance	Candidate	Votes	Percent
Alianza por Baja California (PAN, PANAL, PES)	Pablo Alejo López Núñez	52,203	45.82
Alianza para que Vivas Mejor (PRI, PVEM, PEBC)	Jaime Palafox Granados	50,968	44.73
Party of the Democratic Revolution	Carlos Hafen López	4,542	3.99
Alianza Convergencia-PT; PT - Convergencia	Gabino Ramírez Huerta	2,593	2.28
Social Democratic Alternative Party	Marco Antonio Delgadillo Villanueva	1,296	1.14
None		2,335	2.05
Total		113,937	100.00

Source: PREP

=== Mexicali ===
Party/Alliance	Candidate	Votes	Percent
Alianza por Baja California (PAN, PANAL, PES)	Rodolfo Valdéz Gutiérrez	128,225	51.27
Alianza para que Vivas Mejor (PRI, PVEM, PEBC)	Joaquín Ramírez Chacón	106,502	42.58
Party of the Democratic Revolution	Juan Carlos Ruiz Rubio	6,312	2.52
Alianza Convergencia-PT; PT - Convergencia	Sandra Torres Sánchez	2,658	1.06
Social Democratic Alternative Party	Oscar Hernández Valenzuela	2,296	0.92
None		1,165	2.05
Total		250,116	100.00

Source: PREP

=== Playas de Rosarito ===
Party/Alliance	Candidate	Votes	Percent
Alianza para que Vivas Mejor (PRI, PVEM, PEBC)	Hugo Torres Chabert	13,647	58.86
Alianza por Baja California (PAN, PANAL, PES)	Ignacio García Dwórak	8,161	35.20
Party of the Democratic Revolution	Jorge Luis Quiñones Leyva	730	3.15
Social Democratic Alternative Party	Sergio Ortiz Luna	143	0.62
Alianza Convergencia-PT; PT - Convergencia	Iván Peñaloza Cruz	112	0.48
None		394	1.70
Total		23,187	100.00

Source: PREP

=== Tecate ===
Party/Alliance	Candidate	Votes	Percent
Alianza por Baja California (PAN, PANAL, PES)	Donaldo Peñalosa Ávila	12,279	46.93
Alianza para que Vivas Mejor (PRI, PVEM, PEBC)	César Moreno González de Castilla	11,612	44.38
Party of the Democratic Revolution	Pedro Josué Pineda Simental	965	3.69
Alianza Convergencia-PT; PT - Convergencia	Alfonso Barona García	271	1.04
Social Democratic Alternative Party	Rafael Miravete Basáñez	229	0.88
None		806	3.08
Total		26,162	100.00

Source: PREP

=== Tijuana ===
Party/Alliance	Candidate	Votes	Percent
Alianza por Baja California (PAN, PANAL, PES)	Jorge Ramos Hernández	206,367	48.96
Alianza para que Vivas Mejor (PRI, PVEM, PEBC)	Fernando del Monte Ceceña	200,944	47.67
Party of the Democratic Revolution	Jaime Cleofas Martínez Velóz	8,467	2.00
Social Democratic Alternative Party	Silke de la Parra	3.174	0.75
Alianza Convergencia-PT; PT - Convergencia	Jesús Ignacio Carlos Huerta	2,504	0.59
None		5,860	1.40
Total		427,316	100.00

Source: IEE Baja California

== Congressional election ==
All electoral districts will choose their deputy in the 2007 Baja California State election.

Party/Alliance	Districts
Alianza por Baja California (PAN, PANAL, PES)	14
Alianza para que Vivas Mejor (PRI, PVEM, PEBC)	2
Party of the Democratic Revolution	0
Social Democratic Alternative Party	0
Alianza Convergencia-PT; PT - Convergencia	0

== Post-election controversies ==
After the election the PRI-led Alliance for a Better Life appealed to the state court to invalidate the election. The organization followed its request with protests.

== See also ==
- 2007 Mexican elections
- 2013 Mexican states elections
