= 5th federal electoral district of Baja California =

Federal electoral district of Mexico

Baja California's 5th
- Electoral district of the Chamber of Deputies of Mexico

Incumbent
- Member: Evangelina Moreno Guerra
- Party: ▌Morena
- Congress: 66th (2024–2027)

District
- State: Baja California
- Head town: Tijuana
- Coordinates: 32°31′N 117°02′W
- Covers: Tijuana (part)
- PR region: First
- Precincts: 236
- Population: 436,234 (2020 census)

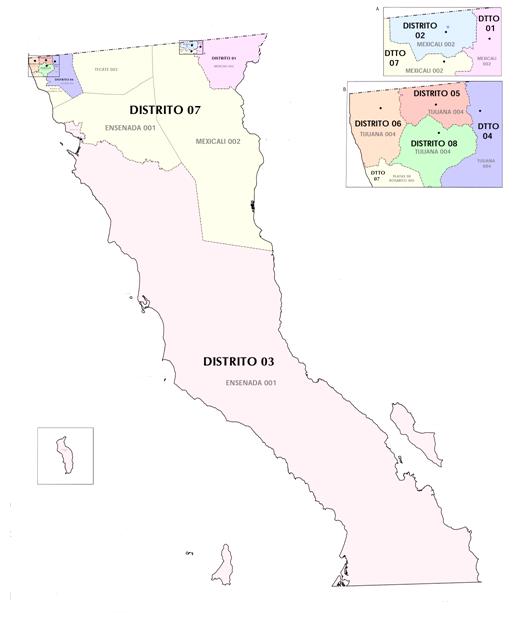
Baja California under the 2017–2022 districting scheme

Baja California's districts between 2005 and 2007

The 5th federal electoral district of Baja California (Spanish: Distrito electoral federal 05 de Baja California) is one of the 300 electoral districts into which Mexico is divided for elections to the federal Chamber of Deputies and one of nine such districts in the state of Baja California.

It elects one deputy to the lower house of Congress for each three-year legislative session by means of the first-past-the-post system. Votes cast in the district also count towards the calculation of proportional representation ("plurinominal") deputies elected from the first region.

The 5th district was created by the 1977 electoral reforms and was first contested in the 1979 mid-term election. The current member for the district, elected in the 2024 general election, is Evangelina Moreno Guerra of the National Regeneration Movement (Morena).

== District territory ==
Under the 2023 districting plan adopted by the National Electoral Institute (INE), which is to be used for the 2024, 2027 and 2030 federal elections, Baja California's seat allocation rose from eight to nine. The 5th district covers 236 precincts (secciones electorales) in the urban core of the municipality of Tijuana. (Note: The 4th, 6th and 8th districts cover the remainder of the city.)

The head town (cabecera distrital), where results from individual polling stations are gathered together and tallied, is the city of Tijuana. The district reported a population of 436,234 in the 2020 census.

== Previous districting schemes ==
Evolution of electoral district numbers
	1974	1978	1996	2005	2017	2023
Baja California	3	6	6	8	8	9
Chamber of Deputies	196	300				

2005–2017

Under the 2005 redistricting process, the district was made up of the central and eastern portions of the city of Tijuana. The district's head town was the city of Tijuana.

1996–2005

Between 1996 and 2005, this electoral district covered a similar area to its 2005 limits, except that it extended south as far as Playas de Rosarito, thereby also including a rural area that it has since lost.

1978–1996

The districting scheme in force from 1978 to 1996 was the result of the 1977 electoral reforms, which increased the number of single-member seats in the Chamber of Deputies from 196 to 300. Under that plan, Baja California's seat allocation rose from three to six. The newly created 5th district covered a part of the city of Tijuana.

== Deputies returned to Congress ==
(Mexico) National parties
- Current
- PAN
- PRI
- PT
- PVEM
- MC
- Morena
- PAZ
- Somos
- Defunct or local only
- PLM
- PNR
- PRM
- PNM
- PP
- PPS
- PARM
- PFCRN
- CON
- PANAL
- PSD
- PES
- PES
- PRD

Baja California's 5th district
Election	Deputy	Party	Term	Legislature
1979	María del Carmen Márquez	Institutional Revolutionary Party	1979–1982	51st Congress
1982	Leonor Rosales Rodríguez	Institutional Revolutionary Party	1982–1985	52nd Congress
1985	Rogelio Preciado Cisneros	Institutional Revolutionary Party	1985–1988	53rd Congress
1988	Oscar Treviño Arredondo	Institutional Revolutionary Party	1988–1991	54th Congress
1991	Miguel Ernesto Enciso Clark	National Action Party (Mexico)	1991–1994	55th Congress
1994	Franciscana Krauss Velarde	Institutional Revolutionary Party	1994–1997	56th Congress
1997	Francisco Javier Reynoso Nuño	National Action Party (Mexico)	1997–2000	57th Congress
2000	José Francisco Blake Mora	National Action Party (Mexico)	2000–2003	58th Congress
2003	José Guadalupe Osuna Millán	National Action Party (Mexico)	2003–2006	59th Congress
2006	Antonio Valladolid Rodríguez	National Action Party (Mexico)	2006–2009	60th Congress
2009	Gastón Luken Garza	National Action Party (Mexico)	2009–2012	61st Congress
2012	Juan Manuel Gastélum Buenrostro	National Action Party (Mexico)	2012–2015	62nd Congress
2015	Máximo García López	National Action Party (Mexico)	2015–2018	63rd Congress
2018	Mario Ismael Moreno Gil	National Regeneration Movement	2018–2021	64th Congress
2021	Evangelina Moreno Guerra	National Regeneration Movement	2021–2024	65th Congress
2024	Evangelina Moreno Guerra	National Regeneration Movement	2024–2027	66th Congress

== Presidential elections ==
Baja California's 5th district
Election	District won by	Party or coalition	%
2018	Andrés Manuel López Obrador	Juntos Haremos Historia	60.2932
2024	Claudia Sheinbaum Pardo	Sigamos Haciendo Historia	59.9183
