= List of municipal presidents of Ensenada =

Mexican politicians

Presidents of the municipality of Ensenada in Baja California.

Name	Party	Term
Claudia Agatón Muñiz	MORENA	2024-Current
Armando Ayala Robles	MORENA	2019–2024
Marco Antonio Novelo Osuna	PRI	2016–2019
Gilberto Antonio Hirata Chico	PRI	2013–2016
Enrique Pelayo Torres	PRI	2010–2013
Pablo Alejo López Nuñez	PAN	2007–2010
César Mancillas Amador	PAN	2004–2007
Jorge Antonio Catalán Sosa	PAN	2001–2004
Ricardo Arjona Goldbaum (Interino)	PRI	2001
Daniel Quintero Peña	PRI	1998–2001
Manuel Montenegro Espinoza	PRI	1995–1998
Oscar Sánchez del Palacio	PAN	1992–1995
Jesús del Palacio Lafontaine	PAN	1989–1992
Enrique Chapela (interim)	PAN	1989
Ernesto Ruffo Appel	PAN	1986–1988
David Ojeda	PST	1983–1986
Raúl Ramírez Funke	PRI	1980–1983
Luis González Ruiz	PRI	1977–1980
Jorge Moreno Bonet	PRI	1974–1977
Octavio Pérez Pazuengo	PRI	1971–1974
Guilebaldo Silva Cota	PRI	1968–1971
Jorge Olguín Hermida	PRI	1965–1968
Adolfo Ramírez Méndez	PRI	1962–1965
Elpidio Berlanga de León	PRI	1959–1962
Santos B. Cota	PRI	1956–1959
Víctor Salazar	PRI	1956
David Ojeda	PRI	1953–1956
