= Javier Castañeda Pomposo =

Mexican politician

Member of the Chamber of Deputies for Baja California's 6th district
- Incumbent
- Assumed office 1 September 2018
- Preceded by: María Luisa Sánchez Meza

Member of the Chamber of Deputies for Baja California's 4th district
- In office 1 September 2000 – 31 August 2003
- Preceded by: Jorge Tomás Esparza Carlo
- Succeeded by: Renato Sandoval Franco

Member of the Congress of Baja California from the 13th district
- In office 1995–1998
- Preceded by: Rafaela Martínez Cantú
- Succeeded by: Héctor Baltazar Chipres

Personal details
- Born: 7 October 1967 (age 58) Tijuana, Baja California, Mexico
- Party: PAN · PES · MORENA
- Occupation: Politician

Javier Julián Castañeda Pomposo (born 7 October 1967) is a Mexican politician. At different times he has been affiliated with the National Action Party (PAN), the Social Encounter Party (PES) and the National Regeneration Movement (MORENA).

Castañeda Pomposo was born in the state of Baja California in 1967 and, in 1990, completed a degree in clinical psychology from the University of Baja California.

From 1995 to 1998 he served in the Congress of Baja California, and he has been elected to the Chamber of Deputies on two occasions: in the 2000 general election, as the PAN's candidate in Baja California's 4th district, and in the 2018 general election, as the PES candidate in Baja California's 6th district; on 3 September 2019, however, he switched allegiance to MORENA.
