= 4th federal electoral district of Baja California =

Federal electoral district of Mexico

Baja California's 4th
- Electoral district of the Chamber of Deputies of Mexico

Incumbent
- Member: Rocío López Gorosave
- Party: ▌Morena
- Congress: 66th (2024–2027)

District
- State: Baja California
- Head town: Tijuana
- Coordinates: 32°31′N 117°02′W
- Covers: Municipality of Tijuana (part)
- PR region: First
- Precincts: 308
- Population: 433,244 (2020 census)

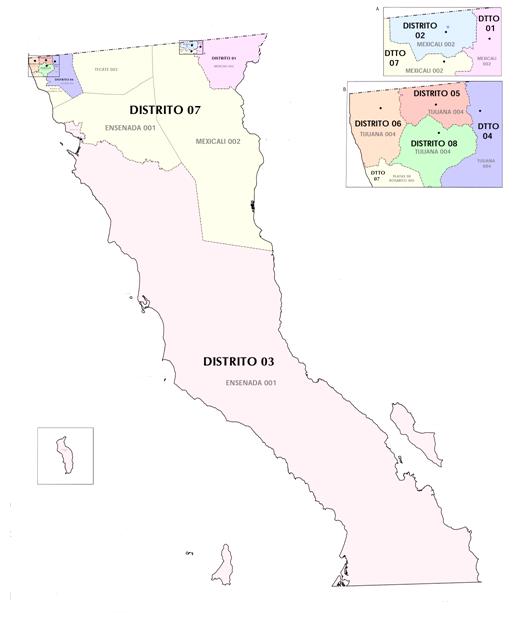
Baja California under the 2017–2022 districting scheme

Baja California's districts between 2005 and 2017

The 4th federal electoral district of Baja California (Spanish: Distrito electoral federal 04 de Baja California) is one of the 300 electoral districts into which Mexico is divided for elections to the federal Chamber of Deputies and one of nine such districts in the state of Baja California.

It elects one deputy to the lower house of Congress for each three-year legislative session by means of the first-past-the-post system. Votes cast in the district also count towards the calculation of proportional representation ("plurinominal") deputies elected from the first region.

The 4th district was created by the 1977 electoral reforms and was first contested in the 1979 mid-term election. The current member for the district, elected in the 2024 general election, is Rocío López Gorosave of the National Regeneration Movement (Morena).

== District territory ==
Under the 2023 districting plan adopted by the National Electoral Institute (INE), which is to be used for the 2024, 2027 and 2030 federal elections, Baja California's seat allocation rose from eight to nine. The 4th district covers 308 precincts (secciones electorales) in the north-eastern sector of the municipality of Tijuana. (Note: The 5th, 6th and 8th districts cover the remainder of the city.)

The head town (cabecera distrital), where results from individual polling stations are gathered together and tallied, is the city of Tijuana. The district reported a population of 433,244 in the 2020 census.

== Previous districting schemes ==
Evolution of electoral district numbers
	1974	1978	1996	2005	2017	2023
Baja California	3	6	6	8	8	9
Chamber of Deputies	196	300				

2017–2022

Between 2017 and 2022, the 4th district covered 316 precincts in the east of the municipality of Tijuana. The head town was at Tijuana.

2005–2017

From 2005 to 2017, the 4th district comprised the north-eastern portion of the municipality of Tijuana. The head town was at Tijuana.

1996–2005

Between 1996 and 2005, the district covered the east of the municipality of Tijuana. The head town was at Tijuana.

1978–1996

The districting scheme in force from 1978 to 1996 was the result of the 1977 electoral reforms, which increased the number of single-member seats in the Chamber of Deputies from 196 to 300. Under that plan, Baja California's seat allocation rose from three to six. The newly created 4th district covered a part of the city of Mexicali and a part of its surrounding municipality.

== Deputies returned to Congress ==
(Mexico) National parties
- Current
- PAN
- PRI
- PT
- PVEM
- MC
- Morena
- PAZ
- Somos
- Defunct or local only
- PLM
- PNR
- PRM
- PNM
- PP
- PPS
- PARM
- PFCRN
- CON
- PANAL
- PSD
- PES
- PES
- PRD

Baja California's 4th district
Election	Deputy	Party	Term	Legislature
1979	Rodolfo Fierro Márquez	Institutional Revolutionary Party	1979–1982	51st Congress
1982	Gilberto Gutiérrez Bañaga	Institutional Revolutionary Party	1982–1985	52nd Congress
1985	Margarita Ortega Villa de Romo	Institutional Revolutionary Party	1985–1988	53rd Congress
1988	Miguel Díaz Muñoz	Institutional Revolutionary Party	1988–1991	54th Congress
1991	Francisco Javier Cital Camacho	Institutional Revolutionary Party	1991–1994	55th Congress
1994	Héctor Humberto López Barraza	Institutional Revolutionary Party	1994–1997	56th Congress
1997	Jorge Tomás Esparza Carlo	National Action Party (Mexico)	1997–2000	57th Congress
2000	Javier Julián Castañeda Pomposo	National Action Party (Mexico)	2000–2003	58th Congress
2003	Renato Sandoval Franco	National Action Party (Mexico)	2003–2006	59th Congress
2006	Ricardo Franco Cázares	National Action Party (Mexico)	2006–2009	60th Congress
2009	Jesús Gerardo Cortez Mendoza	National Action Party (Mexico)	2009–2012	61st Congress
2012	María Elia Cabañas Aparicio	Institutional Revolutionary Party	2012–2015	62nd Congress
2015	Jorge Ramos Hernández (Note: Ramos Hernández resigned his seat on 6 February 2018 and was replaced for the remainder of his term by his alternate, Carrillo Fregoso.); Christian Alejandro Carrillo Fregoso	National Action Party (Mexico)	2015–2018; 2018	63rd Congress
2018	Socorro Irma Andazola Gómez	National Regeneration Movement	2018–2021	64th Congress
2021	Socorro Irma Andazola Gómez (Note: Andazola Gómez died in office on 23 May 2024 but her death was kept a secret by her family until just before the 2 June 2024 general election in which she was running for re-election. Her alternate, Saavedra Talavera, was sworn in on 12 June.); María Teresa Saavedra Talavera	National Regeneration Movement	2021–2024; 2024	65th Congress
2024	Rocío López Gorosave (Note: López Gorosave was selected as the replacement candidate for Andazola Gómez on 1 June 2024, but Andazola Gómez's name appeared on the ballot papers.)	National Regeneration Movement	2024–2027	66th Congress

== Presidential elections ==
Baja California's 4th district
Election	District won by	Party or coalition	%
2018	Andrés Manuel López Obrador	Juntos Haremos Historia	75.5542
2024	Claudia Sheinbaum Pardo	Sigamos Haciendo Historia	79.2024
