= List of municipal presidents of Tijuana =

Municipal President of Tijuana
- Mayor of Tijuana
- Incumbent; Karla Ruiz MacFarland since October 16, 2020
- Term length: Three years, renewable.
- Formation: May 1, 1954
- First holder: Gustavo Aubanel Vallejo
- Website: tijuana.gob.mx

The following is a list of presidents of the municipality of Tijuana in Baja California.

Name	Party	Term
Karla Ruiz MacFarland		2020-Present
Arturo González Cruz		2019–2020
Juan Manuel Gastélum		2016–2019
Jorge Astiazarán Orcí		2013–2016
Carlos Bustamante Anchondo		2010–2013
Jorge Ramos Hernández		2007–2010
Kurt Honold Morales		2007
Jorge Hank Rhon		2004–2007
José de Jesús González Reyes		2001–2004
Francisco Vega de Lamadrid		1998–2001
José Guadalupe Osuna Millán		1995–1998
Héctor Guillermo Osuna Jaime		1992–1995
Carlos Montejo Favela		1989–1992
Federico Valdes Martínez		1986–1989
René Treviño Arredondo		1983–1986
Roberto Andrade Salazar		1980–1983
Xicotencatl Leyva Mortera		1977–1980
Fernando Marquez Arce		1974–1977
Marco Bolaños Cacho		1971–1974
Ernesto Perez Rul		1970–1971
Jose Manuel González Ramirez		1968–1970
Francisco Lopez Gutierrez		1965–1968
Ildefonso Velásquez Martínez		1962–1965
Xicotencatl Leyva Aleman		1959–1962
Manuel Quiroz Labastida		1956–1959
Gustavo Aubanel Vallejo		1954–1956

== See also ==
- Tijuana history and timeline
