= FotoFilm Tijuana =

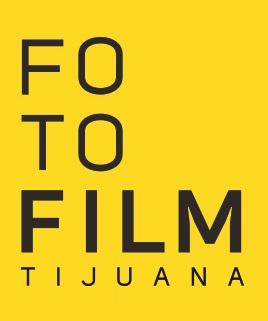
- Location: Tijuana, Baja California, Mexico
- Founded: 14 July 2017; 9 years ago
- Language: Spanish
- Website: fftj.mx

FotoFilm Tijuana is a photography and film festival that takes place annually in Tijuana, Baja California, Mexico, at the Tijuana Cultural Center. It was first organized in 2017.

== History ==
Mexican photographer Julio Rodríguez created FotoFilm Tijuana after noticing the rise of audiovisual recordings with smartphones and tablet computers, "within everyone's reach".

Upon being created, FotoFilm Tijuana was presented as a "platform for exhibition, exchange, learning and promotion of photography and cinema", and the main program included conferences, master classes, panel discussions, workshops, feature and short film exhibitions. The festival also featured work from Mexican filmmakers, bands and performers based in Baja California and a photo contest. Regarding the festival, the Municipal President of Tijuana Juan Manuel Gastélum, commented that "art and culture are necessary elements in education and human development" and that the event is "a great opportunity to present the work of local artists".

The 1st edition of FotoFilm Tijuana was held from July 14–17, 2017, and according to Rodríguez had 30 different activities, 41 speakers, 180 featured artists, and 22,000 attendees. The film William: El Nuevo Maestro del Judo, directed by Omar Guzmán and Ricardo Silva; the anthology film La Habitación, directed by Carlos Carrera, Daniel Giménez Cacho, Carlos Bolado, Ernesto Contreras, Iván Ávila Dueñas, Alfonso Pineda Ulloa, Alejandro Valle, and Natalia Beristáin; and Heroyna, directed by Alejandro Solórzano, were included in the main program. A selection of short films entitled "Desde el Norte" ("From the North") included Microcastillo by Alejandra Villalba García, Al Otro Lado by Rodrigo Álvarez Flores, Leche by Gilberto González Penilla, and Hambre by Alejandro Montalvo, with the latter winning the Audience Award. Mexican actor Noé Hernández, screenwriter María Diego, photographers Rogelio Cuellar, Brandon Echeverrys, Dolores Medel, and Greg Smith, were among the speakers featured.

The 2nd edition of FotoFilm Tijuana was held again at the Tijuana Cultural Center, from July 27–31, 2018. Filmmakers from the Mexican states of Baja California, Baja California Sur, Chihuahua, Durango, Sinaloa, and Sonora also could be included in the "Desde el Norte" section. For the first time all entries entered through the website Film Freeway and a prize equivalent to USD1,000 was awarded to the "Best of Show". Also, for the official selection, 14 films were featured, including Avenida Bugambilia, by Paulina Casmur; Ayer Maravilla Fui by Gabriel Mariño; Ayúdame a Pasar la Noche, by José Ramón Chávez Delgado; Cría Puercos by Ehécatl Garage; El Vigilante by Diego Ros; Etiqueta No Rigurosa by Cristina Herrera Bórquez; Juan y Vanesa by Ianis Guerrero; Los Adioses by Natalia Beristáin; Los Años Azules by Sofía Gómez Córdova; Mente Revolver by Alejandro Ramírez Corona; the anthology film México Bárbaro II, directed by Abraham Sánchez, Carlos Meléndez, Christian Cueva, Diego Cohen, Fernando Urdapilleta, Lex Ortega, Michelle Garza, Ricardo Farías, and Sergio Tello; Piérdete Entre los Muertos by Rubén Gutiérrez; Sueño en Otro Idioma by Ernesto Contreras; and Todos Los Viernes Son Santos by Héctor Villanueva.

The 3rd edition took place from the 26th to the 31st of July 2019. Javier Ávila's Niña Sola received the audience award.

The 5th edition took place from the 23rd to the 25th of July 2021. It opened with René Bueno's Tijuana, I Love You.
