= 2017 FotoFilm Tijuana =

- Opening film: William: The New Judo Master
- Closing film: Heroyna
- Location: Tijuana, Baja California, Mexico
- Founded: 2017
- No. of films: 3
- Festival date: 14–17 July 2017
- Website: www.fftj.mx

The 1st FotoFilm Tijuana Festival took place from 14 to 17 July 2017, in Tijuana, Baja California, Mexico. As stated by its CEO, Julio Rodríguez, the first edition of the festival, held at the Tijuana Cultural Center, had 30 different activities, 41 speakers, 180 featured artists, and 22,000 attendees. The official selection for short films was divided in two fields: "Desde el Norte" ("From the North") including four short films by Mexican directors based on Baja California; and "Jukebox Visual", for short films sent through an open call for filmmakers posted on the FilmFreeway website. The feature films included in the main program were selected by the festival film programmer.

== Official selection ==
=== Feature films ===
The selection included two feature films, William: El Nuevo Maestro del Judo and Heroyna; and the anthology film La Habitación.

English title	Original title	Director(s)	Production country
William: The New Judo Master	William: El Nuevo Maestro del Judo	Omar Guzmán and Ricardo Silva	Mexico
Tales of Mexico	La Habitación	Carlos Carrera, Daniel Giménez Cacho, Carlos Bolado, Ernesto Contreras, Iván Ávila Dueñas, Alfonso Pineda Ulloa, Alejandro Valle, and Natalia Beristáin	Mexico, Poland
Heroyna		Alejandro Solórzano	Mexico

=== Short films ===
==== Desde el Norte ====
The selection for "Desde el Norte" ("From the North") included four short films directed by Mexican filmmakers based on the state of Baja California. Hambre, directed by Alejandro Montalvo, won the Audience Award.

English title	Original title	Director(s)	Production country
Microcastle	Microcastillo	Alejandra Villalba García	Mexico
The Other Side	Al Otro Lado	Rodrigo Álvarez Flores	Mexico
Milk	Leche	Gilberto González Penilla	Mexico
Hunger	Hambre	Alejandro Montalvo	Mexico
