= Margarita Ortega Villa =

Mexican politician (1951–1996)

Senator for Baja California
- In office 1 September 1988 – 15 March 1989

Federal deputy for Baja California's 4th
- In office 1 September 1985 – 31 August 1988

Member of the Congress of Baja California
- In office 1974–1977

Personal details
- Born: 5 May 1951 Mexicali, Baja California, Mexico
- Died: 7 January 1996 (aged 44) Federal District, Mexico
- Party: PRI
- Education: UABC
- Occupation: Politician
- Profession: Sociologist
- Known for: 1989 Baja California gubernatorial election

Margarita Ortega Villa (Note: In this Mexican name, the surname is Ortega and the second or maternal family name is Villa. She was also known by the married name Margarita Ortega [Villa] de Romo.) (5 May 1951 – 7 January 1996) was a Mexican politician from the state of Baja California. A member of the Institutional Revolutionary Party (PRI), she served in the Congress of Baja California, represented her state in both chambers of Congress, and contended unsuccessfully for the governorship in 1989.

== Life and career ==
Margarita Ortega Villa was born in Mexicali, Baja California, on 5 May 1951. In 1973 she earned a degree in sociology from the Autonomous University of Baja California (UABC), where she also taught both before and after graduating.

In 1973–1976 she was the alternate of Federico Martínez Manautou, who was elected to the Chamber of Deputies to represent Baja California's 1st congressional district in the 1973 mid-terms; she deputised for him in 1974–1975. She was later elected to the Congress of Baja California for the 1974–1977 term and, from 1982 to 1985, was the alternate of José Ignacio Monge Rangel in the federal Congress, again representing Baja California's 1st.

In the 1985 mid-terms, Ortega was elected to the Chamber of Deputies in her own right, representing Baja California's 4th district for the duration of the 53rd Congress (1985–1988). At the end of her term in the lower house, she was elected to the Senate for Baja California in the 1988 general election.

She resigned her Senate seat on 15 March 1989 in order to contend as the PRI's candidate for governor of Baja California in that year's state election and was replaced by her alternate, César Moreno Martínez de Escobar, for the remainder of her congressional term. She came second in the 2 July 1989 election, defeated by a result of 47.83% to 38.29% in favour of Ernesto Ruffo Appel of the National Action Party (PAN). (Note: Candidates from four other parties – PRD, PARM, PPS and PFCRN – failed to break 2% of the vote.) Ruffo's victory was the first occasion an opposition party had won a state governorship since the creation of the National Revolutionary Party (PNR) – the forerunner of the PRI – in 1929.

Following her defeat in the gubernatorial election, Ortega Villa declined to return to her Senate seat, despite the urgings of colleagues including Dulce María Sauri Riancho. She served as director-general of the National Consumer Institute (INCO) from 1989 to 1992.

Margarita Ortega Villa died of cancer in Mexico City on 7 January 1996, at the age of 44.

== Family ==
Margarita Ortega's parents were Mario Ortega Cervantes and Carmen Villa Aguilar. She was married to José Jesús Romo Reynoso.
