= Julio Rodríguez (photographer) =

Mexican landscape photographer and cultural promoter

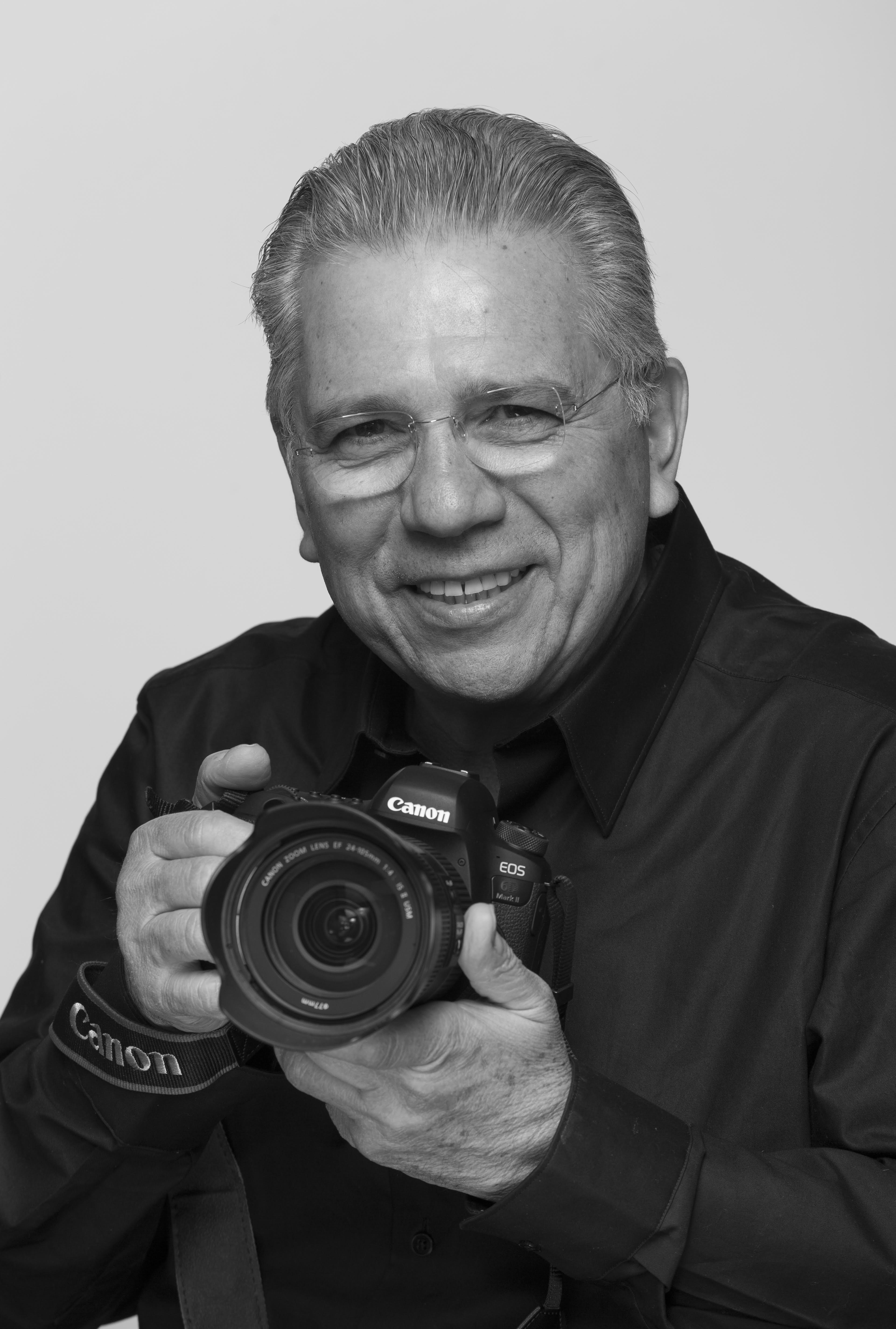
- Portrait by José Luis Venegas (2018)
- Born: Julio Rodríguez Ramos; 27 June 1956 (age 68); Ciudad Obregón, Sonora, Mexico
- Known for: Landscape photographer
- Website: juliorodriguezfoto.com

Julio Rodríguez Ramos (Latin American Spanish: [ˈxuljo roðˈɾiɣes ˈramos]; born June 27, 1956) is a Mexican landscape photographer and cultural promoter based in Baja California, Mexico. He was born in Ciudad Obregón, Sonora, and during his childhood he enjoyed photography, which later became his profession. After several individual and collective exhibitions, Rodríguez released a photo-book titled Baja California: De Mar a Mar (2011).

In 2005, Rodríguez funded Entijuanarte, an arts festival held at the Tijuana Cultural Center created to provide an exhibition space for independent artists. Following his departure from Entijuanarte, Rodríguez created FotoFilm Tijuana, a photography and film festival, also at the Tijuana Cultural Center; in 2017. In 2010, Rodríguez was awarded the Tijuana's Tourism Merit by the city's Tourism and Conventions Committee for his work promoting the city, his photographic career and cultural lobbying.

== Background and photography career ==
Rodríguez was born in Ciudad Obregón, Sonora, Mexico, on June 27, 1956. At eight years old he developed an interest in photography and during his youth he won contests sponsored by Kodak. Since 1985, he resides in Baja California and has worked as a business manager and as managing director of multiple radio stations.

After deciding the state should do more to promote its natural resources, in 2000, Rodriguez started traveling and photographing its landscape. His landscape photography has been seen in individual and collective exhibitions held at multiple locations, such as Tijuana Cultural Center (2008), San Diego's International Airport and Natural History Museum (2009), University of Tijuana (CUT) (2014), Center for Technical and Higher Education (CETyS) (2015–2017), Technological University of Tijuana (CUT) (2015–2016), and the Mexican Consulates of San Diego (2016), Santa Ana and San Bernardino (2017). In 2007, a selection of his photographs of the Valle de Guadalupe and Bahía de los Ángeles appeared in National Geographic magazine.

In 2008, he held two individual exhibitions; "La Vid" ("The Vine") at the Institute of the Americas and "Costas del Mar de Cortés" ("Coasts of the Sea of Cortés") at the Mingei International Museum, both in San Diego, California. In 2009, another individual exhibition, this time about Baja California, was held at the Reforma 222 complex in Mexico City. The same year, an exhibition titled "Desierto, Migración y Frontera" ("Desert, Migration and Border") was held at the Autonomous University of Baja California (UABC).

Rodríguez was awarded the Tijuana's Tourism Merit by the city's Tourism and Conventions Committee in 2010 for "his work in the projection of Tijuana nationally and internationally, from his photographic career and his cultural lobbying". In 2011, he released a photo-book titled Baja California: De Mar a Mar. About the book, Rodríguez said: "few populations in the world count on the geographic privilege of Baja California, a land that joins sea, desert, valleys, mountains, art rock and vestiges of missions that as a whole it is a worthy natural treasure, not only to worship, but also worth enough to document". A selection of the images included in the book was exhibited at the Tijuana's City Hall in 2012.

== Arts festivals ==
=== Entijuanarte ===
In addition to his work as a photographer, Rodríguez funded an arts festival called Entijuanarte in 2005, an arts festival that includes a program of cultural and artistic intervention of the northwest of Mexico. After a visit to the ArtWalk in Little Italy, San Diego, Rodríguez thought the format could be replicated in Tijuana, since the city was suffering from a spree of violence; he said, "[art] allows to re-signify the city, and recover the public space" to Emeequis magazine. The event was intended for independent artists to exhibit their work. In 2017, it was announced that Rodríguez would leave Entijuanarte to pursue new projects.

=== FotoFilm Tijuana ===
Following his tenure in Entijuanarte, Rodríguez created a photography and film festival called FotoFilm Tijuana, after noticing the rise of audiovisual recordings with smartphones and tablet computers. As part of daily life, recording videos and taking photographs, "is within everyone's reach", Rodríguez said to Mexican newspaper Milenio. He also noted that users are creating simple and free content and this creative facility creates the bases of interest in the public for this kind of events. The first edition of FotoFilm Tijuana was held from July 14–17, 2017, and according to Rodríguez had 30 different activities, 41 speakers, 180 featured artists, and 22,000 attendees. The second edition of the festival (July 27–31, 2018) expanded to five days and included 60 different activities.

== Bibliography ==
- Baja California: De Mar a Mar (2011)

== Gallery ==
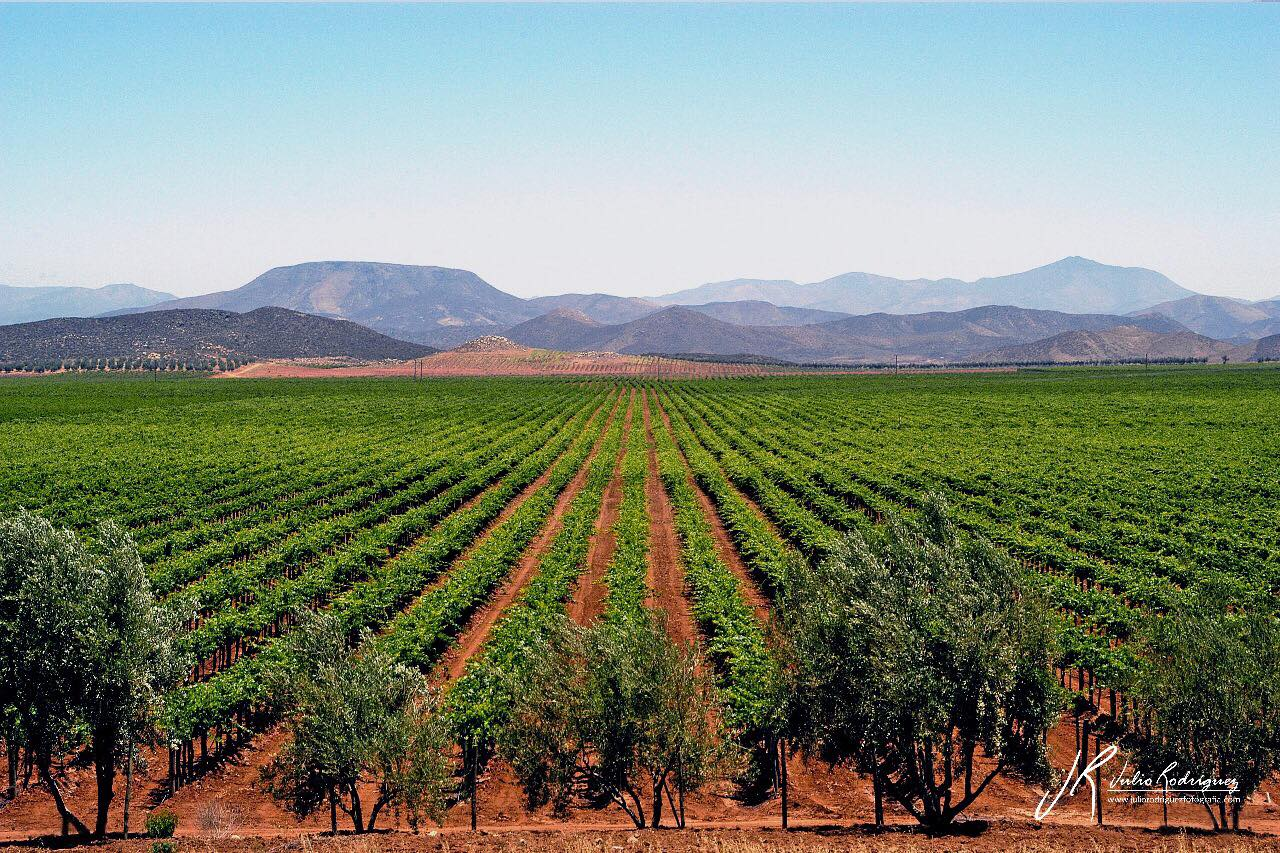
Valle de San Vicente (2005)

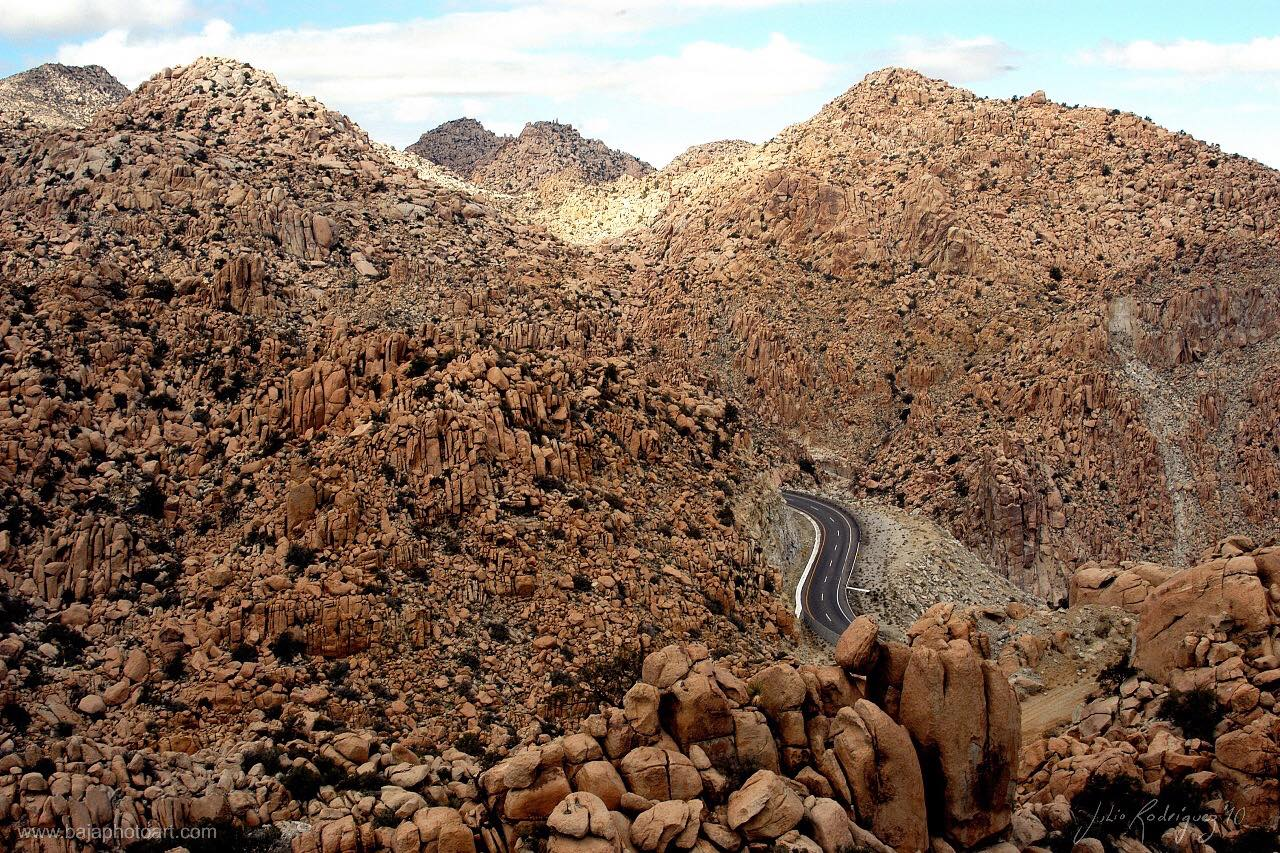
La Rumorosa (2008)

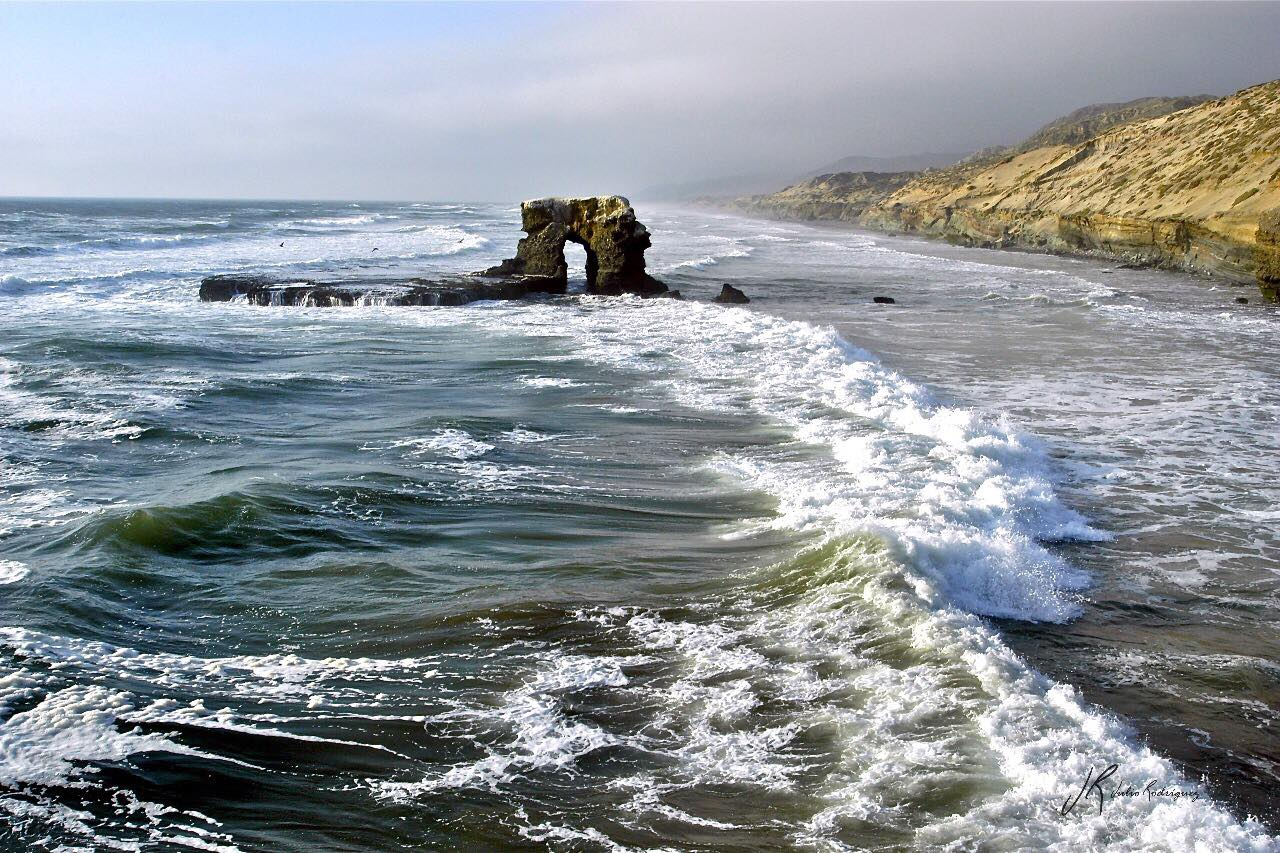
Ventana al Mar, Ocean Pacific (2011)
