= Alicia Llanos de Ramos =

First Lady of Tijuana

21st First Lady of Tijuana
- In office 2007–2010
- Preceded by: Maria Elena Borquez

Personal details
- Spouse: Jorge Ramos Hernández

Alicia Llanos de Ramos is the wife of Jorge Ramos Hernández, the current Municipal president of Tijuana.

She holds the honorary title of First Lady of Tijuana, and officially serves as President of the Municipal DIF Sponsorship.

Preceded by María Elena Bórquez	First Lady of Tijuana; 2007-2010	Succeeded by incumbent
Preceded by María Elena Bórquez	President of the Municipal DIF Sponsorship; 2007-2010	Succeeded by incumbent
