= Osuna (disambiguation) =

Osuna is a town and municipality in the province of Seville, Spain.

Osuna may also refer to:

== People ==
- Al Osuna (born 1965), Mexican baseball player
- Alejandro Osuna (born 2002), Mexican baseball player
- Antonio Osuna (born 1973), Mexican baseball player
- Blanca Osuna (born 1950), Argentine politician
- Francisco de Osuna (1492/97–1540), Spanish Franciscan friar and writer
- Gloria Osuna Perez (1947–1999), Chicana artist
- Héctor Osuna Jaime (born 1957), Mexican architect and politician
- Jess Osuna (1928–2011), American character actor
- José Carlos Cota Osuna (born 1946), Mexican politician
- José Guadalupe Osuna Millán (born 1955), Mexican economist and politician, Governor of Baja California
- José Osuna (born 1992), Venezuelan baseball player
- Juan María Osuna (1785–1851), early settler of San Diego, California
- Mario Osuna (born 1988), Mexican football player
- Rafael Osuna (1938–1969), Mexican tennis player
- Roberto Osuna (born 1995), Mexican baseball player
- Sercan Sararer-Osuna (born 1989), German footballer

== Other uses ==
- Bull of Osuna, a 5th century BCE Iberian sculpture
- Codex Osuna, a 1565 Aztec codex
- Duke of Osuna, a Spanish noble title
- University of Osuna (1548–1824), an institution and building in Seville, Spain

== See also ==
- Ozuna
