= Arturo González =

Arturo González may refer to:

- Arturo González Cruz (1954–2024), Mexican politician
- Alfonso González (Arturo Alfonso González González; born 1994), Mexican footballer

== See also ==
- Arthur Gonzalez U.S. jurist
