= Kiko Vega =

Mexican politician

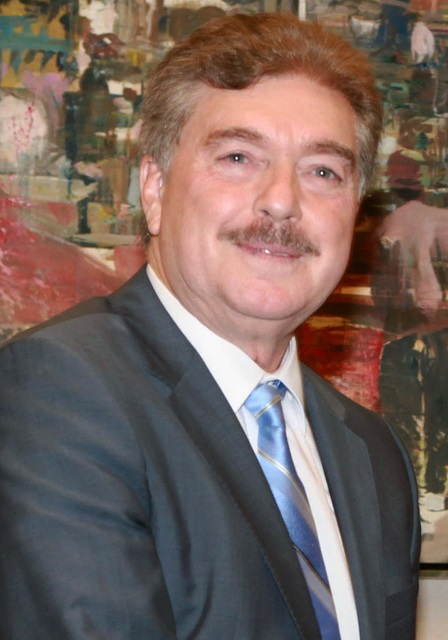

15th Governor of Baja California
- In office 1 November 2013 – 31 October 2019
- Preceded by: José Guadalupe Osuna Millán
- Succeeded by: Jaime Bonilla Valdez

17th Municipal President of Tijuana
- In office 1 November 1998 – 31 October 2001
- Preceded by: José Guadalupe Osuna Millán
- Succeeded by: Jesús González Reyes

Personal details
- Born: Francisco Vega de Lamadrid; 22 May 1955 (age 71) Ciudad Obregón, Sonora, Mexico
- Party: PAN
- Education: Centro de Enseñanza Técnica y Superior

Francisco Arturo Vega de Lamadrid, also known as Kiko Vega (born May 22, 1955), is a Mexican politician of the National Action Party who was the 15th Governor of Baja California, for the term from 2013-2019. He previously served as the Municipal President of Tijuana, from 1998 to 2001. He later served as a member of Mexico's Chamber of Deputies as part of the LXI Legislature of the Mexican Congress from 2009 to 2012. He succeeded José Guadalupe Osuna Millán, having taken office on 1 November 2013.

== Early life ==
Vega graduated from the Centro de Enseñanza Técnica y Superior in 1978 with a degree in business administration.

== Candidacy for Governor ==
On November 2, 2011, while he was a federal deputy (or legislator), he announced his candidacy for governor of Baja California. On March 10, 2013 he won the PAN's primary election for the first time (having sought the nomination twice previously), beating another ex-mayor of Tijuana, Héctor Guillermo Osuna Jaime.

The Baja California governor's election took place on July 7, 2013. Vega's major opponent was Fernando Castro Trenti of the Institutional Revolutionary Party. Apart from the PAN, Vega was also supported by the Party of the Democratic Revolution and the New Alliance; Trenti was supported by the Ecologist Green Party of Mexico and the Labor Party in addition to his own PRI. Vega won by 3% of the vote, 47% to 44%.

Political offices
Preceded by José Guadalupe Osuna Millán	Governor of Baja California; 2013 — 2019	Succeeded by Jaime Bonilla
Preceded by José Guadalupe Osuna Millán	Municipal President of Tijuana; 1998 — 2001	Succeeded by Jesús González Reyes
