= Julio Rodríguez (disambiguation) =

Julio Rodríguez (born 2000) is a Dominican baseball player.

Julio Rodríguez may also refer to:

- Julio Rodríguez (photographer) (born 1956), Mexican photographer
- Julio Cesar Rodríguez (cyclist) (born 1966), Colombian cyclist
- Julio Rodríguez (footballer, born 1968), Uruguayan footballer
- Julio Rodríguez (footballer, born 1977), Uruguayan footballer
- Júlio Rodriguez (footballer, born 1980), Brazilian footballer
- Julio Rodríguez (footballer, born 1984), Spanish footballer
- Julio Rodríguez (footballer, born 1990), Paraguayan footballer
- Julio Rodríguez (footballer, born 1995), Spanish footballer
- José Julio Rodríguez Fernández (born 1948), a Spanish Air Force general
- Julio César Rodríguez (television host) (born 1969), a Chilean television journalist
