= Daniel Quintero =

Daniel Quintero may refer to:

- Daniel Quintero (Colombian politician) (born 1980), Colombian politician
- Daniel Quintero (Mexican politician) (born 1951), Mexican politician
- Daniel Quintero (born 1949), Spanish painter
