= Ozuna (disambiguation) =

Family name

Ozuna is a Spanish surname. Notable people with the surname include:

- Ozuna (born 1992), stage name of Juan Carlos Ozuna Rosado, Puerto Rican reggaeton and Latin trap singer
- Bobby Ozuna, one half of the production team, Jake and the Phatman
- Erick Ozuna López (born 1990), Dominican footballer
- Marcell Ozuna (born 1990), Dominican baseball outfielder
- Pablo Ozuna (born 1974), Dominican baseball utility player
- Sunny Ozuna, lead singer of Sunny & the Sunglows
- Jorge Radhamés Zorrilla Ozuna (born 1954), Dominican general and politician

== See also ==
- Osuna (disambiguation)
