= Gilberto Hirata =

Mexican politician

Personal details
- Born: 17 January 1953 (age 73) Valle de Guadalupe, Baja California
- Party: Institutional Revolutionary Party

Gilberto Antonio Hirata Chico (born 17 January 1952) is a Mexican politician who served as a federal deputy in the Chamber of Deputies representing the Third Federal Electoral District of Baja California (corresponding to the urban area of Ensenada, Baja California) and as a state deputy in the XIX Legislature of the Congress of Baja California. He formerly served as municipal president of the Ensenada Municipality. He is a member of the Institutional Revolutionary Party (PRI).

== See also ==
- 2007 Baja California state election
