= Alberto Murguia Orozco =

Mexican businessman and politician

Alberto Murguia Orozco (born 1955) is a Mexican businessman and politician. He is best identified as a partner of Jorge Hank Rhon in Grupo Caliente, one of Latin America's largest gaming corporations. Murguia first became elected to public office in 2006, when he was elected as a federal supplemental senator for the Partido Revolucionario Institucional. He is also the co-owner of the Mexican professional football team Club Tijuana.
