= Ricardo Franco =

Ricardo Franco may refer to:

- Ricardo Franco (director) (1949–1998), Spanish screenwriter, film director and actor
- Ricardo Franco (Mexican actor) (born 1980), Mexican television actor
- Ricardo Franco Front, a Colombian guerrilla group

== See also ==
- Ricardo Franco Cázares (born 1970), Mexican politician
