= Hugo Eric Flores Cervantes =

Mexican politician

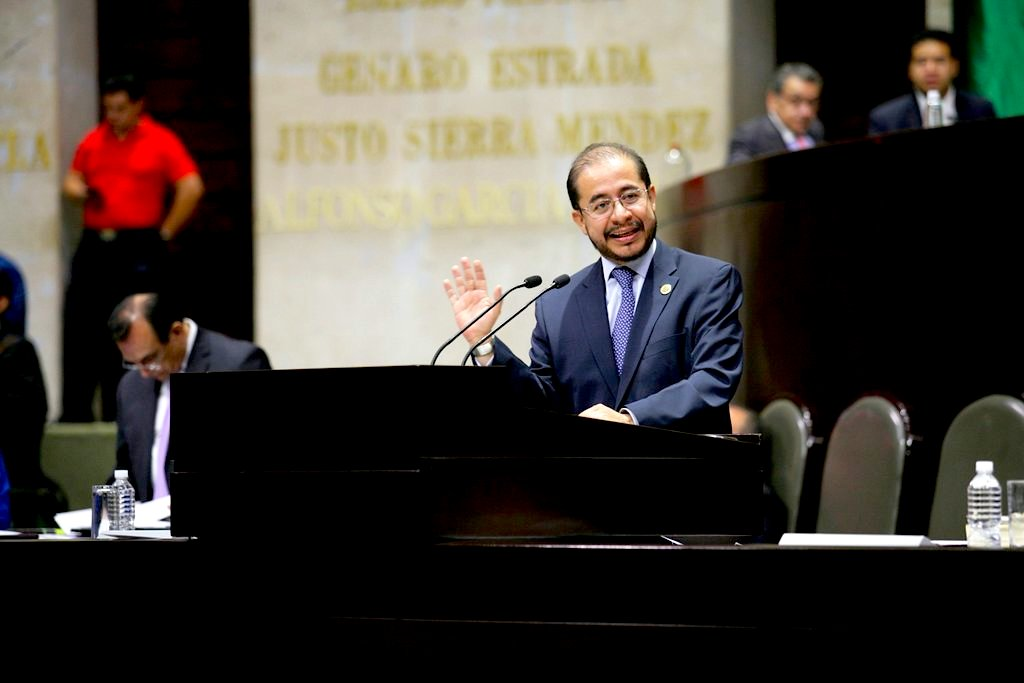

Member of the Chamber of Deputies
- In office 1 September 2024 – 31 August 2026

President of the Solidarity Encounter Party
- In office 4 September 2020 – 30 August 2021

President of the Social Encounter Party
- In office 9 July 2014 – 12 September 2018

Member of the Chamber of Deputies
- In office 1 September 2015 – 2 March 2017

Personal details
- Born: Hugo Eric Flores Cervantes; 2 March 1969 (age 57) Mexico City, Mexico
- Party: Building Societies of Peace
- Other political affiliations: Morena (2023–2026); Solidarity Encounter Party (2020-2021); Social Encounter Party (2006–2018)
- Education: National Autonomous University of Mexico; Harvard University

Hugo Eric Flores Cervantes (born 2 March 1969) is a Mexican politician, attorney, and Neo-Pentecostal pastor. He founded Building Societies of Peace (PAZ), a conservative political party. He also founded two other parties Social Encounter Party (PES), and its successor, the Solidarity Encounter Party. Flores Cervantes was both parties' national president and one of the Social Encounter Party's eight federal deputies in the 63rd session of Congress. He is currently a member of the Chamber of Deputies for Morena.

== Early life and education ==
Flores Cervantes obtained a law degree from the National Autonomous University of Mexico (UNAM) in 1992 and two degrees from Harvard University: a master's degree in public, economic, and gubernatorial law in 1996, as well as a J.D. in 2001. In addition to becoming a partner at the law firm of Durán, Flores, and Soria, he was the pastor of Casa sobre la Roca (House on the Rock), a Neo-Pentecostal church that supported Felipe Calderón in the 2006 presidential election.

== Social Encounter Party ==
In 2006, the Social Encounter Party was founded as a national political group, which, unlike a party, is not federally funded; it was also organized as a party in Baja California. That same year, after Calderón's election, he obtained a civil service position in the Secretariat of Environment and Natural Resources (SEMARNAT). After six months in the post, he was accused by the secretariat's internal oversight agency of disobeying orders from the secretary and altering a document, prompting his removal and barring him from a public service position until 2020.

Additionally, for the 60th and 61st sessions of Congress, Flores Cervantes was an unused alternate senator for the National Action Party (PAN); he had previously been an alternate federal deputy for the Institutional Revolutionary Party (PRI).

In 2014, concurrent with the Social Encounter Party's transition to a national political party, Flores Cervantes was named President of the National Directive Committee of the party, its highest position.

== Federal deputy ==
The PES placed Flores Cervantes at the top of its list of candidates for proportional representation seats in the Chamber of Deputies from the fourth electoral region (which includes Mexico City), guaranteeing him a seat in the Chamber for the 63rd Congress (2015–2018). He sat on the Social Development, Finances, and Public Credit, and Constitutional Points Commissions, as well as the Committee for the Center for the Study of Public Finances. Additionally, he has been designated a PES representative in various capacities, including before the National Electoral Institute and as one of the fourteen designees of the Chamber of Deputies to the Constituent Assembly of Mexico City.

In June 2020, Flores Cervantes denied allegations of links to organized crime.

In September 2023, he filed paperwork with the National Electoral Institute, enabling him to collect signatures for a possible run as an independent candidate for president of Mexico in the 2024 general election. His bid was unsuccessful.

In the 2024 general election, he was re-elected to the Chamber of Deputies as a plurinominal deputy for the National Regeneration Movement (Morena).
