= 2013 Mexican state elections =

In 2013, there were elections in 13 states in Mexico.

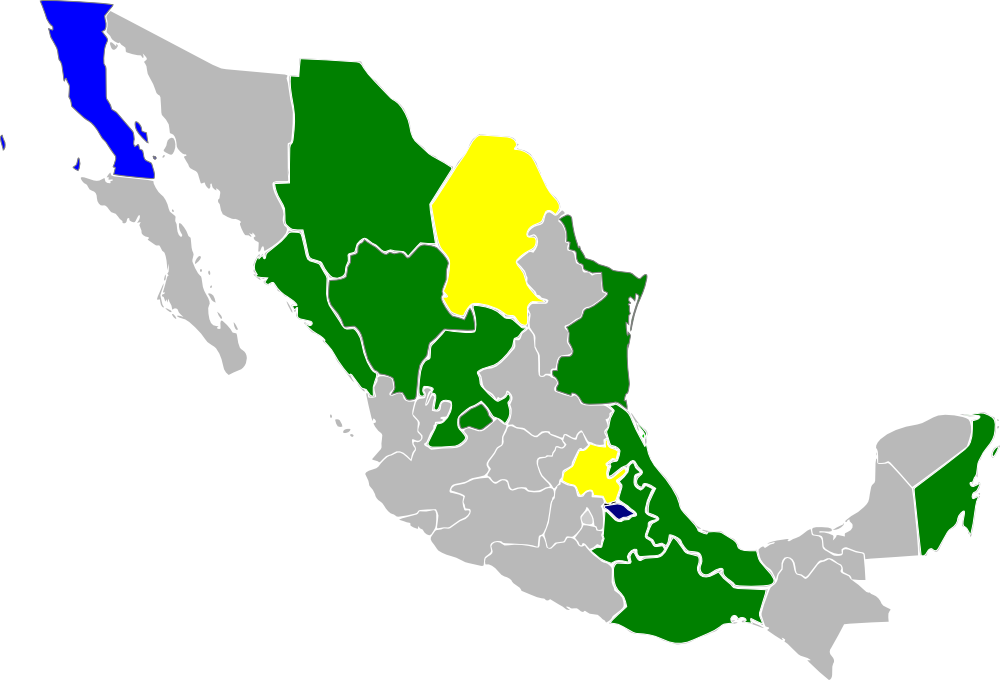
States in which elections were held 3 seats filled 2 seats filled 1 seat filled

== Elections ==
=== Aguascalientes ===
There were elections for 11 mayors and 18 local councillors.

=== Baja California ===
There were elections for the governor, 5 mayors and 25 councillors.

The PAN candidate, Francisco Vega de Lamadrid narrowly defeated PRI candidate Fernando Castro Trenti, and became the next governor of Baja California. The election count was temporarily halted after local officials believed there was an error with an counting algorithm.

=== Chihuahua ===
There were elections for 67 mayors and 33 councillors.

=== Coahuila ===
There were elections for 38 mayors in all municipalities.

=== Durango ===
There were elections for 39 mayors and 30 councillors.

=== Hidalgo ===
There were elections for 30 mayors.

=== Oaxaca ===
There were elections for 570 mayors and 42 councillors.

=== Puebla ===
There were elections for 217 mayors and 41 councillors.

=== Quintana Roo ===
There were elections for 10 mayors and 25 councillors.

=== Sinaloa ===
There were elections for 18 mayors and 40 councillors.

=== Tamaulipas ===
There were elections for 88 mayors and 436 councillors.

=== Tlaxcala ===
There were elections for 60 mayors, 32 councillors, and 391 community presidents.

=== Veracruz ===
There were elections for 212 mayors and 50 councillors.

=== Zacatecas ===
There were elections for 58 mayors and 30 councillors.
