= Juan Manuel Gastélum =

Mexican politician (1954–2025)

Juan Manuel Gastélum Buenrostro
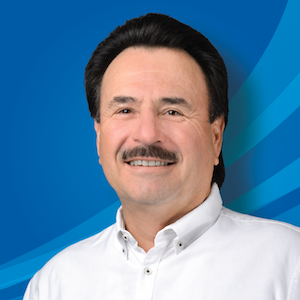
- Born: 31 October 1954; Tijuana, Baja California, Mexico
- Died: 9 April 2025 (aged 70)
- Other name: "El Patas"
- Political party: PAN

Juan Manuel Gastélum Buenrostro (31 October 1954 – 9 April 2025) was a Mexican politician affiliated with the National Action Party (PAN).

Gastélum was born in Tijuana, Baja California, in 1954 and earned a degree in law from the University of Sonora in 1978. He became an active member of the PAN in 1992.

In 2007 he was elected to the 19th session of the Congress of Baja California and, in the 2012 general election, he was elected to the federal Chamber of Deputies to represent Baja California's 5th district during the 62nd session of Congress.

He was later elected municipal president of Tijuana for the 2016–2019 term. At the end of his term he ran for re-election but was defeated by Arturo González Cruz of the National Regeneration Movement (Morena).

Gastélum died in Tijuana on 9 April 2025, at the age of 70. He had been taken ill three days earlier.
