= Antonio Valladolid Rodríguez =

Mexican politician

- Born: 22 February 1973 (age 53); San Diego, California, United States
- Occupation: Politician
- Political party: PAN

Antonio Valladolid Rodríguez (born 22 February 1973) is a Mexican politician affiliated with the National Action Party (PAN). In 2006 he was elected to the Chamber of Deputies for the 60th Congress, representing Baja California's fifth district.
