= Héctor Ramos Covarrubias =

Mexican politician

- Born: 1 August 1938; Ameca, Jalisco, Mexico
- Died: 14 April 2020 (aged 81); Ensenada, Baja California, Mexico
- Occupation: Politician
- Political party: PAN

Héctor Manuel Ramos Covarrubias (Note: In this Mexican name, the surname is Ramos and the second or maternal family name is Covarrubias.) (1 August 1938 – 14 April 2020) was a Mexican politician affiliated with the National Action Party (PAN). In the 2006 general election, he was elected to the Chamber of Deputies to represent Baja California's 3rd district during the 60th Congress.

Ramos Covarrubias died in Ensenada, Baja California, on 14 April 2020.
