= Christian Carrillo =

Mexican politician

Christian Alejandro Carrillo Fregoso is a Mexican businessman, politician, and philanthropist. He served as a deputy representing the fourth federal electoral district of Baja California in 2018.

Carrillo was also the Secretary of the Commission of Foreign Relations in the Chamber of Deputies.

On February 6, 2018, at the request of Ramos Hernandez, Carillo rendered a protest in his new entrustment as Legislator of the LXIII Legislature by the Parliamentary Group of National Action (GPPAN).

He is the CEO of ATISA Industrial.
