= María Elia Cabañas =

Mexican politician

- Occupation: Politician
- Political party: PRI

María Elia Cabañas Aparicio is a Mexican politician affiliated with the Institutional Revolutionary Party (PRI). In the 2012 general election she was elected to the Chamber of Deputies to represent Baja California's 4th district during the 62nd session of Congress.
