= Jesús Gerardo Cortez Mendoza =

Mexican politician

- Born: 28 January 1963 (age 63); Tijuana, Baja California, Mexico
- Occupation: Politician
- Political party: PAN

Jesús Gerardo Cortez Mendoza (born 28 January 1963) is a Mexican politician from the National Action Party (PAN). In the 2009 mid-terms he was elected to the Chamber of Deputies to represent Baja California's 4th district during the 61st session of Congress.
