= Fernando Castro Trenti =

Mexican politician (born 1955)

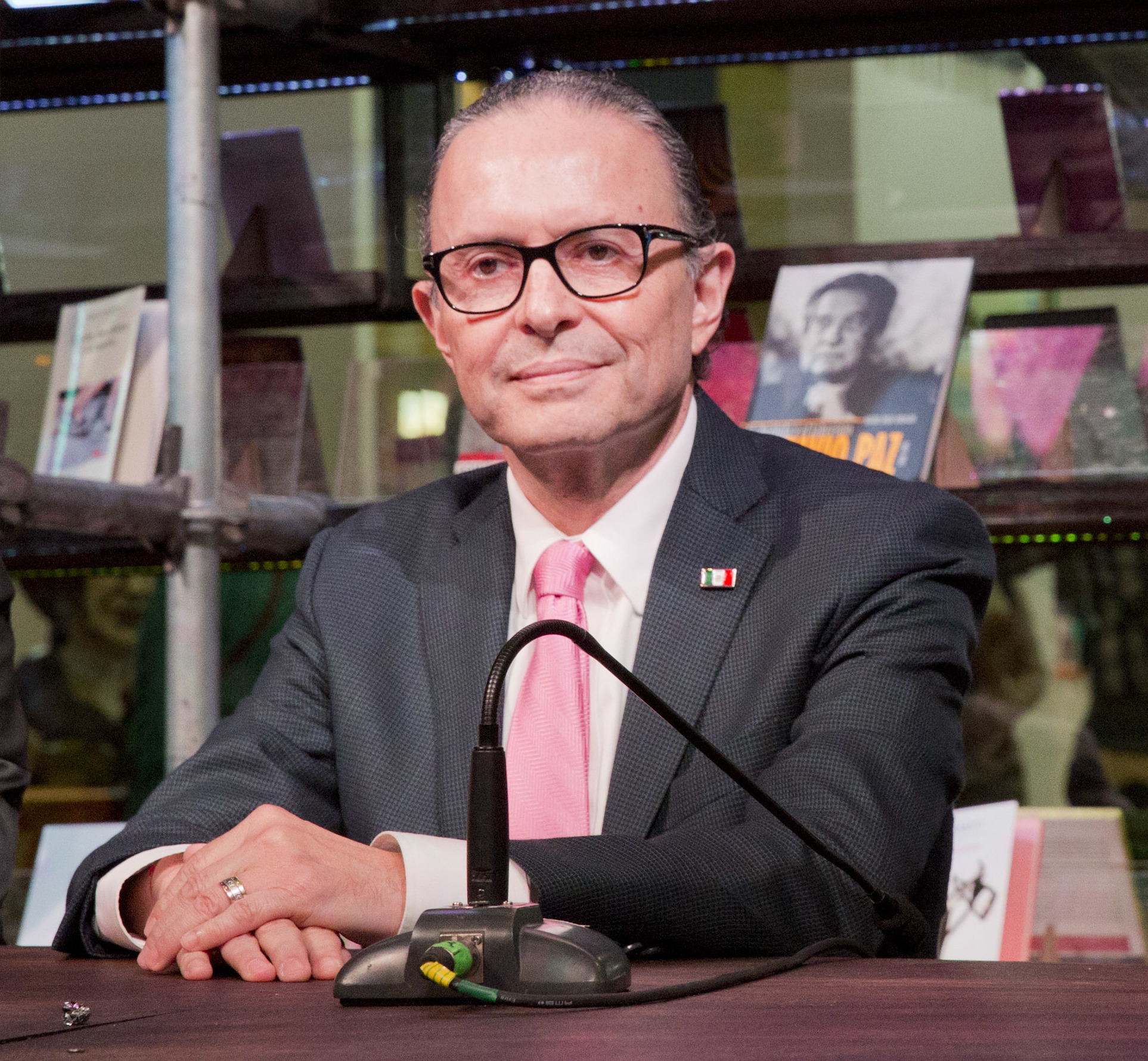
Jorge Castro Trenti

Fernando Jorge Castro Trenti (born 14 November 1955) is a Mexican politician. He was a member of the Institutional Revolutionary Party (PRI). Since 2017, he has been part of the National Regeneration Movement (Morena). He served in the LX and the LXI Legislatures as senator representing the State of Baja California.

Castro Trenti holds a bachelor's degree in law from the National Autonomous University of Mexico (UNAM). He has occupied different positions in the public service sector in Baja California. From 2001 to 2004, he served as a local deputy in the Congress of Baja California. In 2004, Jorge Hank Rhon designated him as secretary of government of the Municipality of Tijuana, but he left that position to serve as a senator during the LX and the LXI Legislatures (2006–2012).

As a Senate for the LX Legislature, he presided both Communications and Transports and Internal Administration for the Senate, he is well known as one of the most recognized political operators for his party and country, and well known as responsible for the retrieval of power in the 2010 Municipal and local congress elections for [the] PRI (Revolutionary Institutional Party), and as a consequence for the still official Party, situation that has set him as a potential candidate for the governor's office of Baja California.
