= Héctor Osuna Jaime =

Mexican architect and politician (born 1957)

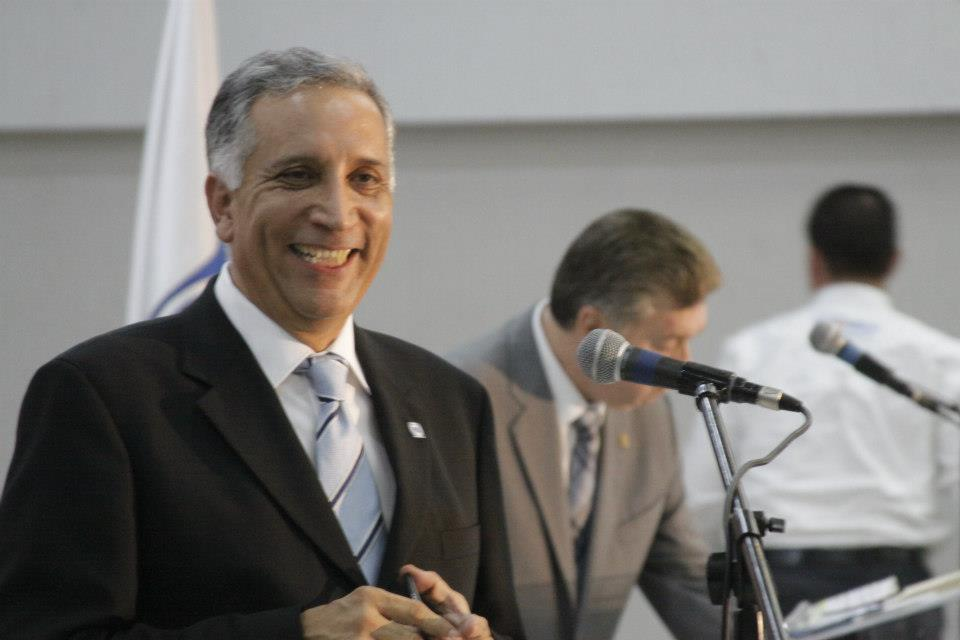

Municipal President of Tijuana
- In office 1 November 1992 – 31 October 1995
- Preceded by: Carlos Montejo Fabela
- Succeeded by: José Guadalupe Osuna Millán

President of the Federal Commission of Telecommunications
- In office 2006–2010
- Preceded by: Jorge Arredondo
- Succeeded by: Mony de Swaan Addati

Personal details
- Born: 25 June 1957 (age 68) Mexico City, Mexico
- Party: PAN
- Occupation: Architect and politician

Héctor Guillermo Osuna Jaime (born 25 June 1957) is a Mexican architect and politician affiliated with the National Action Party who acted as Municipal President of Tijuana between 1992 and 1995 and as President of the Federal Commission of Telecommunications between 2006 and 2010. As of 2014 he served as Senator of the LIX Legislature of the Mexican Congress representing Baja California.
