= Karla Patricia Ruiz MacFarland =

Mexican politician

Karla Ruiz McFarland

28th Mayor of Tijuana
- In office February 12, 2021 – September 29, 2021
- Preceded by: Arturo González Cruz
- Succeeded by: Montserrat Caballero
- In office October 16, 2020 – November 5, 2020; Acting
- Preceded by: Arturo González Cruz
- Succeeded by: Arturo González Cruz

Personal details
- Born: Karla Patricia Ruiz McFarland Tijuana, Baja California, Mexico
- Party: MORENA
- Spouse: Gabriel Portilla
- Education: Ibero-American University Tijuana (BS)

Karla Ruiz McFarland is a Mexican politician who served as the 28th mayor of Tijuana. A member of the National Regeneration Movement, she is the first female mayor of Tijuana and the former Secretary of Municipal Education.

== Early life and education ==
Ruiz McFarland is the daughter of Guillermo Ruiz Hernández, the current Attorney General of Baja California. She attended Our Lady of Peace, a private Catholic high school in San Diego, and graduated from the Ibero-American University Tijuana with a bachelor's degree in Communications.

== Early career ==
Before entering politics, she worked at marketing agencies and news outlets, including for TV Azteca and PSN. She also founded El Foro de Baja California, a newspaper specializing in Law, and served as Director of Public Relations at her family's law firm.

In 2019, she joined the municipal cabinet as head of the Municipal Education Secretariat.

== Mayor of Tijuana ==
Ruiz McFarland was appointed mayor of Tijuana on October 16, 2020, after then-mayor Arturo González Cruz briefly stepped down to seek the state government candidacy for his Morena political party. Her term ended momentarily on November 5 when González resumed his mayoral duties while awaiting a decision on his nomination. On February 12, 2021, she returned to the mayor's office after González's resignation. She left the post on September 29.
