= Pablo Alejo López Núñez =

Mexican politician (born 1967)

- Born: 17 July 1967 (age 59); Ensenada, Baja California, Mexico
- Education: UABC
- Occupation: Politician
- Political party: PAN

Pablo Alejo López Núñez (Note: In this Mexican name, the surname is López and the second or maternal family name is Núñez.) (born 17 July 1967) is a Mexican politician affiliated with the National Action Party (PAN).

López Núñez is a native of Ensenada, Baja California, and holds a degree in law from the Autonomous University of Baja California (UABC). In the 2003 mid-terms, he was elected to the Chamber of Deputies to represent Baja California's 3rd district during the 59th Congress. From 2007 to 2010, he served as the municipal president of Ensenada.
