= Arturo González Cruz =

Mexican politician (1954–2024)

Arturo González Cruz as president of the Confederation of National Chambers of Commerce, Services and Tourism

Arturo González Cruz (August 2, 1954 – June 19, 2024) was a Mexican politician and businessman, recognized for his term as Municipal President of the XXIII City Council of Tijuana between 2019 and 2020. During his career, he held other positions such as professor at the CETYS School of Business and Administration, director of the Tijuana Chamber of Commerce, and national president of the Confederation of National Chambers of Commerce, Services and Tourism.

== Biography ==
=== Early years and studies ===
González Cruz studied a bachelor's degree in business administration at the Instituto Tecnológico de Estudios Superiores de Monterrey, graduating in 1976. He later served as a professor at the CETYS School of Business and Administration in Tijuana.

=== Career ===
After graduation, Gonzalez dedicated himself to the construction, sale and rental of real estate. In the 1990s, he became professionally involved with the Tijuana Chamber of Commerce, serving as its president. In 2001, he was appointed national president of the Confederation of National Chambers of Commerce, Services and Tourism (CONCANACO), succeeding José Yamil Hellal Zapata. He held the position until 2003 when he was succeeded by Raúl Padilla Orozco. During his administration, he was an opponent of the tax reform that proposed to tax medicines and food with VAT.

Linked to the Party of the Democratic Revolution, González was a candidate for the Senate of the Republic in the formula where the current president of Mexico, Andrés Manuel López Obrador, was a first-time candidate for the presidency.

=== Presidency of the Municipality of Tijuana ===
In 2019, he was nominated by the coalition called Juntos Haremos Historia, formed by the parties Morena, PES, Verde Ecologista and PT in Baja California. In this way, he became candidate for the Municipal Presidency of the Tijuana City Council representing the National Regeneration Movement. González obtained 152,633 votes, 42.45% of the total vote, and was appointed municipal president of the city council by defeating Julián Leyzaola Pérez of the PRD and Juan Manuel Gastelúm of the PAN, who placed second and third in the vote respectively.

He assumed office on October 1, 2019, succeeding Juan Manuel Gastélum Buenrostro. On October 14, 2020, he requested a leave of absence to seek the position of Governor of the State of Baja California. Once approved by the council, on October 16, he left the position of municipal president of Tijuana, which was occupied by Karla Patricia Ruiz McFarland.

=== Death ===
González Cruz died on June 19, 2024 from complications arising from injuries that he had sustained in a skiing accident in California in December 2022, which had left him paralyzed. He was 69.
