= Ricardo Franco Cázares =

Mexican politician

- Born: 16 November 1970 (age 55); Durango, Durango, Mexico
- Occupation: Politician
- Political party: PAN

Ricardo Franco Cázares (born 16 November 1970) is a Mexican politician affiliated with the National Action Party (PAN). In the 2006 general election he was elected to the Chamber of Deputies to represent Baja California's 4th district during the 60th session of Congress.
