= Centro de Enseñanza Técnica y Superior =

Private university in Baja California, Mexico

Technical and Higher Education Center
- Centro de Enseñanza Técnica y Superior
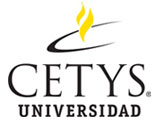
- Type: Private multiple-campus university
- Established: 1961
- Academic affiliations: ANUIES, WASC, FIMPES, CONAHEC, among others
- President: Dr. Fernando León García
- Faculty: +500
- Students: 7700
- Location: Mexicali, Tijuana, Ensenada, Baja California, Mexico; 32.656°N 115.407°W
- Campus: 3 in Baja California, Mexico; urban
- Colors: Yellow, black, white
- Nickname: Zorros
- Website: www.cetys.mx/en

Mexicali campus' entrance.

Centro de Enseñanza Técnica y Superior (CETYS) is a private university founded in 1961, located in the state of Baja California. CETYS is a three-campus university system in Engineering, Business and the Social Sciences.

CETYS is accredited by the Western Association of Schools and Colleges.

== History ==
Under the support of a group of businessmen, who formed the Instituto Educativo del Noroeste (IENAC), a not-for-profit civil association that supports CETYS. The institution opened its doors on September 20, 1961, in Mexicali. Tijuana began operating in 1970, with the Ensenada campus following in 1975.

Today, IENAC is led by Gustavo Vildosola Ramos, while Dr. Fernando Leon Garcia is the university President.

== Organizational structure ==
CETYS possesses an Academic Advisory Council (CCA) responsible for analyzing and discussing transcendental issues of interest to the CETYS University System.

== Campuses ==
- Ensenada
- Mexicali
- Tijuana

CAT Building at Mexicali campus.

== Alumni ==
- Francisco Vega de Lamadrid, governor of the state of Baja California & former mayor of Tijuana, Baja California
- Lupita Jones, Miss Universe 1991
- Abe Vázquez, Musician and producer with Vázquez Sounds
- Marina del Pilar Ávila Olmeda, politician
- Ramses Cantu Acevedo, football player for Toluca FC
- Rey de las bromas, youtuber conocido por hacerle bromas al burro y al taquero Rey de las bromas
