= María Mercedes Maciel Ortiz =

Mexican politician (born 1959)

- Born: 1 December 1959 (age 66); Ciudad Manuel Doblado, Guanajuato, Mexico
- Occupation: Politician
- Political party: PT

María Mercedes Maciel Ortiz (born 1 December 1959) is a Mexican politician from the Labor Party. She has served as Deputy of the LVII and LX Legislatures of the Mexican Congress representing Oaxaca. She previously served as a regidora (city councillor) in Tijuana from 1986 to 1989, elected as a member of the now-defunct Workers' Socialist Party (PST).
