= Renato Sandoval Franco =

Mexican politician

- Born: 27 June 1964 (age 61); Baja California, Mexico
- Occupation: Politician
- Political party: PAN

Renato Sandoval Franco (born 27 June 1964) is a Mexican politician affiliated with the National Action Party (PAN). In the 2003 mid-terms he was elected to the Chamber of Deputies to represent Baja California's 4th district during the 59th session of Congress.
