= Jorge Ramos Hernández =

Mexican politician

21st Municipal president of Tijuana
- In office 2007–2010
- Preceded by: Kurt Honold
- Succeeded by: Carlos Bustamante Anchondo

Personal details
- Born: July 11, 1968 (age 57) Tijuana, Baja California, Mexico
- Party: PAN
- Spouse: Maritza Gutierrez Posada

Jorge Ramos Hernández (born July 11, 1968) is a Mexican politician from the National Action Party (PAN). He was the municipal president of Tijuana from 2007 to 2010 and he served in the Chamber of Deputies representing the fourth federal electoral district of Baja California from 2015 to 2018.

== Life ==
After abandoning his studies to receive a law degree from the Universidad Autónoma de Baja California, Ramos Hernández began a political career. He joined the PAN in 1989 and would later serve on the municipal party council of Tijuana and also at the state level.

His first position in the municipal government came when he served on the city council between 1998 and 2001. After three years, he was tapped to become the Director of Social Development for the city. He resigned in 2003 in order to pursue a candidacy for municipal president, which he lost to Jorge Hank Rhon; after the campaign, he became the director of the Baja California State Public Services Commission.

=== Municipal president and trial ===
In 2007, Ramos Hernández won election as municipal president of Tijuana, an office he would hold for three years. One of the signature projects of his presidency, the use of hydraulic concrete to repave streets throughout the city, resulted in a large debt load that later municipal presidents would need to refinance.

After his term ended, he was a councilor for Banobras and an advisor to SEDESOL, but he mostly remained private and away from the public eye.

In 2011, the Jurisdictional Commission of Baja California state congress voted unanimously to initiate a political trial against Ramos Hernández for failing to pay 80 million pesos to the social services institute for Baja California state and municipal employees. The case was abandoned, but when it came up three years later in the next Baja California state congress, the legislature closed it, saying the statute of limitations had expired.

=== Chamber of Deputies ===
In 2015, voters in the fourth district of Baja California, including Tijuana, elected Ramos Hernández to the Chamber of Deputies for the LXIII Legislature. Beginning February 1, 2016, Ramos serves as President of the Public Security Commission; he also sits on a bicameral commission on national security and the Chamber of Deputies's Rural Development Commission. He previously had served on the Commission for the Strengthening of Federalism as its secretary, a position he left when he was tapped to head the Public Security Commission (replacing Miguel Ángel Yunes of Veracruz), and on the Northern Border Matters Commission, which he left on March 31, 2016.
