= César Mancillas Amador =

Mexican politician

- Born: 21 May 1958 (age 68); Ensenada, Baja California, Mexico
- Occupation: Politician
- Political party: PAN

César Mancillas Amador (born 21 May 1958) is a Mexican politician from the National Action Party. From 2009 to 2012 he served as Deputy of the LXI Legislature of the Mexican Congress representing Baja California.
