= Conservatism in North America =

Conservatism in North America is a political philosophy that varies in form, depending on the country and the region, but that has similar themes and goals. Academic study into the differences and similarities between conservatism in North American countries has been undertaken on numerous occasions. Reginald Bibby has asserted that the primary reason that conservatism has been so strong and enduring throughout North America is because of the propagation of religious values from generation to generation. This connection is strongest in mainstream Protestantism in the United States, and both Protestantism and Roman Catholicism in Canada.

According to Louis Hartz, nations that developed from settler colonies were European "fragments" that froze the class structure and underlying ideology prevalent in the mother country at the time of their foundation. He considered Latin America and French Canada to be fragments of feudal Europe, and the United States and English Canada as liberal fragments. However Gad Horowitz, writing that Hartz had acknowledged a Tory influence in English Canada, claimed a conservative tradition had developed there as well. American conservatism is different from European conservatism, with its combination of traditionalism and libertarianism, and has its roots in American traditions and classical liberalism of the 18th and 19th centuries, although Canada also developed an American-style conservatism that competed with the older Tory conservatism. A right-wing conservatism, or "Latin conservatism", developed in Latin America and Quebec. Today, conservative and conservative liberal parties in North America cooperate through the International Democrat Union.

== Canada ==
Conservatism in Canada is generally considered to be primarily represented by the modern-day Conservative Party of Canada in federal party politics, and by various centre-right and right-wing parties at the provincial level. The first party calling itself "Conservative" in what would become Canada was elected in the Province of Canada election of 1854.

Far-right politics have never been a prominent force in Canadian society. Canadian conservative ideology is rooted in British "Tory-ism", rather than American liberalism. Stemming from the resettlement of United Empire Loyalist after the American Revolutionary War with traditionalist conservatism views alongside pro-market liberalism ideals, is the reason that unlike the conservatives in the United States, Canadian conservatives generally prefer the Westminster system of government. The United States of America is a federal republic with a presidential democracy, while Canada is a federal parliamentary democracy with a constitutional monarchy.

== United States ==
Conservatism is a major political ideology in the United States. American conservatism is different from European conservatism, and it has its roots in American Republicanism and classical liberalism. In contemporary American politics, it is usually associated with the Republican Party. Characteristics of conservative principles include limited government, respect for American traditions, support for Judeo-Christian values, moral universalism, individualism and defense against perceived threats posed by communism and socialism. Economically, U.S. conservatives support fiscal conservatism, economic liberalism, laissez faire capitalism, and opposition to government intervention in economy. In foreign policy, American conservatives usually advocate a strong national defense. They support the doctrine of "American exceptionalism", a belief that the U.S. is unique among nations and that its standing and actions do and should guide the course of world history.

Although there has always been a conservative tradition in America, the modern American conservative movement began during the 1950s. Russell Kirk popularized conservatism after publishing The Conservative Mind (1953). Two years later, in 1955, William F. Buckley Jr. founded National Review, a conservative magazine that included traditionalists, such as Kirk, along with libertarians and anti-communists. This bringing together of separate ideologies under a conservative umbrella was known as fusionism. The term was invented by Frank Meyer. Politically, the conservative movement in the U.S. has often been a coalition of various groups, which has sometimes contributed to its electoral success and other times been a source of internal conflict.

Modern conservatism saw its first national political success with the 1964 nomination of Barry Goldwater, a U.S. Senator from Arizona and author of The Conscience of a Conservative (1960), as the Republican candidate for president. In 1980, the conservative movement was able to attract disaffected Southern Whites (who were formerly Democrats), neoconservatives (former Cold War liberal Democrats), and evangelical Christians, to nominate and elect the Republican candidate Ronald Reagan, a conservative, as president. The 1980s and beyond is known as the Reagan Era, a conservative decade. Today's conservatives regard Reagan as the iconic conservative hero. Subsequent electoral victories included gaining a Republican congressional majority in 1994 and the election of George W. Bush in 2000 and 2004.

The conservative movement has been advanced by influential think tanks such as The Heritage Foundation, American Enterprise Institute, Hoover Institution, Hudson Institute and Manhattan Institute for Policy Research. Major media outlets such as The Wall Street Journal, New York Post and Fox News are often described as conservative.

Since the 1970s, the two major American political parties, the Democrats and the Republicans, have become increasingly polarized, with the Democrats described as "liberal" and "left wing" and the Republicans as "conservative" and "right wing". The alt-right has pushed the Overton window to the right, making conservative positions seem more centrist.

== Mexico ==
In Mexico, political conservatism originally arose in reaction to the Mexican War of Independence. Because of his prominence in the Mexican Conservative Party, Lucas Alamán has been called "the most organized intelligence behind Conservatism in Mexico." Throughout the presidency of Miguel Alemán Valdés between 1946 and 1952, the politics of the country experienced a significant shift towards conservatism. Gastón García Cantú has performed the most extensive study of Mexican conservatism to date.

== Central America ==
Before the 1930s, Central American countries generally had dichotomous politics divided along conservative-liberal lines, but the effects of the Great Depression in the area caused most of these opposing parties to merge in order to maintain authority. Traditionally, political conservatism in the area has been ideologically linked with Protestantism, but this connection has been questioned in recent years. One of the most prominent historical representatives of conservatism in Central America was Rafael Carrera, the first President of Guatemala. Not only did he effectively suppress liberal reforms in his own country, but he contributed greatly to the unity and influence of conservatism in each of the countries throughout Central America.

=== Belize ===
Belize is generally a conservative country as demonstrated by their laws which make abortion and male homosexuality illegal. The primary conservative party in Belize since the country's first parliamentary election as an independent state in 1984 has been the United Democratic Party. Nonetheless, the other major political party, the People's United Party, has a very similar political ideology. Historically, both parties have tended to be more conservative while in power than when in opposition.

=== Guatemala ===
Conservatism in Guatemala has always been closely linked with the country's Roman Catholic clergy. Between the declaration of Guatemala's independence in 1821 and the Liberal Revolution of 1871, the country's politics were dominated by conservatism. In the mid-twentieth century, Francisco Javier Arana served as a unifying force for conservatives in Guatemala after his own presidency.

=== Panama ===
When Panama was separated from Colombia in 1903, the newly independent country of Panama was initially controlled by a military junta led by José Agustín Arango and Manuel Amador Guerrero. Although the junta included a few token liberal members, the administration was heavily conservative. Politics in the country were strongly divided along conservative-liberal lines in the following years. Conservatives were in power until a military coup in 1968.

== Caribbean ==
The main conservative political body in the Caribbean is the Caribbean Democrat Union (CDU) which was formed in 1986 by Anglo-Caribbean leaders to unify conservative political parties in the region. The CDP is a suborganization of the International Democrat Union (IDU). In Beyond a Boundary, C. L. R. James argues that the influence of cricket and English literature have been instrumental in strengthening conservativism in the Caribbean.

=== Cuba ===
In the early 20th century, the concept of conservatism was not well-defined in Cuban politics. In 1913, Mario García Menocal became the third President of Cuba and the first Cuban president representing the Conservative Party of Cuba when the Liberal Party of Cuba split between supporters of Alfredo Zayas y Alfonso and supporters of José Miguel Gómez. Still, the conservative-liberal distinction fails to address many of the major political issues in Cuban governmental history.

Although Cuba's government remains ideologically communist, evangelical churches have allowed the growth of conservative ideas and groups within religious institutions. Many of these churches influence debates on civil liberties such as abortion and LGBT rights.

== Study of concept ==
A 2002 conference at the University of Augsburg which was dedicated to this very topic. There were two main concepts discussed at the conference. The first concept was the connection between the brand of conservatism arising in the 1980s and the 1990s and social democracy. The second concept was simply an exploration of the differences and similarities between conservatism in Canada and the United States. Some feminist scholars have suggested that the prevalence of conservatism throughout North America has resulted in the continent's general post-feminist stance.

== See also ==
- Conservatism in Latin America
- Jewish conservatism
