= Building Societies of Peace =

Political party in Mexico

Building Societies of Peace Construyendo Sociedades de Paz
- Leader: Hugo Eric Flores Cervantes; Armando González Escoto
- Founded: 25 June 2026
- Preceded by: Solidarity Encounter Party
- Ideology: Conservatism
- Political position: Right-wing
- Colors: Purple, lilac

Website
- partidopaz.mx

Building Societies of Peace (Spanish: Construyendo Sociedades de Paz; PAZ) is a political party in Mexico. It is led by Hugo Eric Flores Cervantes, who previously led the Christian right parties Social Encounter Party (PES, 2014–2018) and Solidarity Encounter Party (PES, 2020–2021), and former PES federal deputy Armando González Escoto. Like its predecessors, the party has a conservative ideology. Despite this, like the previous parties, it is expected to support Mexico's ruling party, Morena, a left-wing political party.

== Name ==
The party's name in Spanish is Construyendo Sociedades de Paz, and its acronym, PAZ, is the Spanish word for "peace". The organization had initially adopted the acronym CSP, which coincided with the initials of Claudia Sheinbaum Pardo, the president of Mexico at the time it sought registration as a political party in 2026. In February 2026, Sheinbaum objected to that usage. On 21 February 2026, the electoral tribunal prohibited the partisan use of the initials CSP. The organization then changed its acronym to PAZ, under which it obtained registration in June 2026.
