= Daniel Quintero (Mexican politician) =

Mexican politician

Municipal president of Ensenada
- In office 1998–2001
- Preceded by: Manuel Montenegro
- Succeeded by: Ricardo Arjona

Member of the Chamber of Deputies for Baja California's 3rd district
- In office 1 September 1994 – 31 August 1997
- Preceded by: Rogelio Appel
- Succeeded by: Francisco Vera

Personal details
- Born: Daniel Quintero Peña; 1951 (age 74–75)
- Citizenship: Mexican
- Party: PRI
- Spouse: Georgina Corral
- Children: 3
- Education: University of Guadalajara (B.Arch.); La Sorbonne (Ph.D. in Urban and Regional Planning)
- Occupation: Politician
- Profession: Architect

Daniel Quintero Peña (/kwɪntˈɛroʊ/ kwin-TEHR-oh; [daˈnjel kinˈteɾo]; born 1951) is a Mexican architect and politician from the Institutional Revolutionary Party (PRI).

== Early life and education ==
Quintero was born in 1951. He studied architecture at the University of Guadalajara and holds a Ph.D. in Urban and Regional Planning from La Sorbonne.

== Political career ==
A member of the PRI, Quintero served as a federal deputy for Baja California's 3rd federal electoral district from 1 September 1994 to 31 August 1997.

From 1998 to 2001, he served as the municipal president of Ensenada.

In a competitive primary, Quintero secured the PRI nomination for the 2001 Baja California state election. He was defeated by the National Action Party (PAN) candidate Eugenio Elorduy Walther.

In the 2006 Mexican general election, he ran as the PRI candidate for federal deputy for Baja California's 3rd district.

== Personal life ==
Quintero is married to Georgina Corral, with whom he has three children.

Political offices
Preceded by Rogelio Appel	Member of the Chamber of Deputies; 1994–1997	Succeeded by Francisco Vera
Preceded by Manuel Montenegro	Municipal president of Ensenada; 1998–2001	Succeeded by Ricardo Arjona
