= José Guadalupe Osuna Millán =

Mexican politician

José Guadalupe Osuna
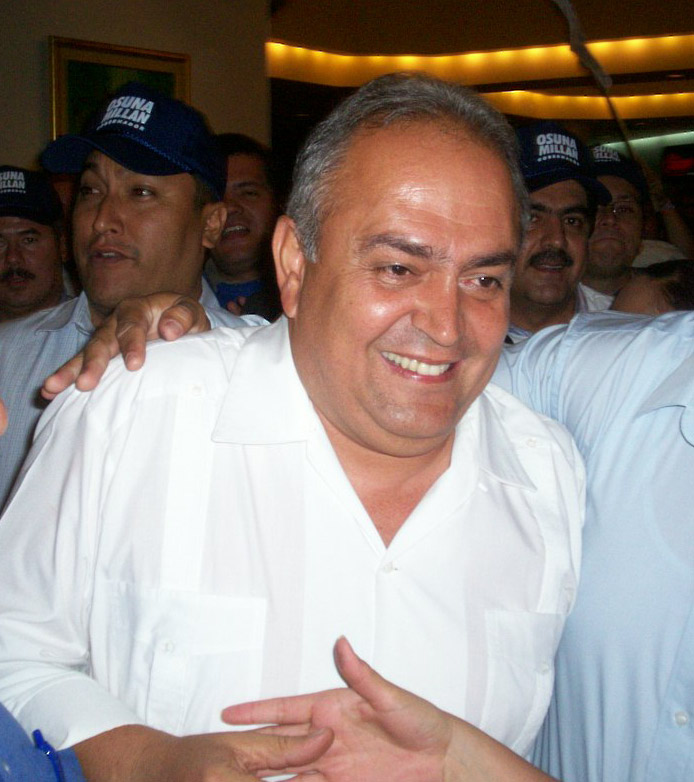

14th Governor of Baja California
- In office 1 November 2007 – 31 October 2013
- Preceded by: Eugenio Elorduy
- Succeeded by: Francisco Vega de Lamadrid

16th Municipal President of Tijuana
- In office 1 November 1995 – 31 October 1998
- Preceded by: Héctor Osuna Jaime
- Succeeded by: Francisco Vega de Lamadrid

Personal details
- Born: December 10, 1955 (age 70) Aguacaliente de Gárate, Sinaloa
- Party: PAN
- Spouse: Carmina Capuchino de Osuna
- Website: www.osunamillan.org

José Guadalupe Osuna Millán (born December 10, 1955) is a Mexican economist and politician member of the National Action Party (PAN) who served as Governor of Baja California.

== Life and education ==
Osuna graduated in Economics from the Universidad Autónoma de Baja California and has a Master's Degree in Economics from the Instituto Politécnico Nacional.

== Political career ==
Osuna worked in the private sector before becoming an active PAN member. He has served as municipal president of Tijuana (1995—1998) and as the Director of the State Commission of Water.

In 2003, he was elected as Federal Representative in the LIX Legislature of the Mexican Congress for the V Electoral District of Baja California.

In 2007 he ran as the PAN candidate for Governor of Baja California in the 2007 Baja California state election. Osuna won the election defeating the PRI candidate Jorge Hank. Currently he is leading an effort to crack down on the drug cartels and corruption within the state government.

== Government career ==
- 1979-1981. Secretariat of Programs and Budget. Researcher.
- 1982-1984. Baja California Autonomous University. School of Economics. Deputy Director of Academics.
- 1984. Baja California Autonomous University. Economic and Social Studies Institute. Director.
- 1983-1985. Secretariat of Human Settlement and Public Works of the State of Baja California (SAHOPE). Director of Public Investment.
- 1985-1986. Secretariat of Human Settlements and Public Works of the State of Baja California (SAHOPE). Director of the Ensenada-Guadalupe Valley Aqueduct.
- 1989. Secretariat of Human Settlements and Public Works of the State of Baja California (SAHOPE). Under Secretary of Public Investment.
- 1990-1995. Tijuana's State Commission of Public Services (CESPT). Director.
- 1995-1998. Mayor of Tijuana, Municipality of Tijuana.
- 1998-2000. Baja California State Water Commissión. Director.
- 2003-2006. Federal Representative at the Chamber of Deputies.
- 2007-2013. Governor of state of Baja California.

== See also ==
- 2007 Baja California state election
- 1995 Baja California state election
- 2003 Mexican legislative election

| Preceded by Eugenio Elorduy Walther | Governor of Baja California; 2008 — 2013 | Succeeded by Francisco Vega de Lamadrid |
| Preceded by | Member of the Legislature of the Mexican Congress; 2003–2006 | Succeeded by |
| Preceded by Héctor Osuna | Municipal president of Tijuana; 1995–1998 | Succeeded by Francisco Vega de Lamadrid |
