= Jorge Hank Rhon =

Mexican politician

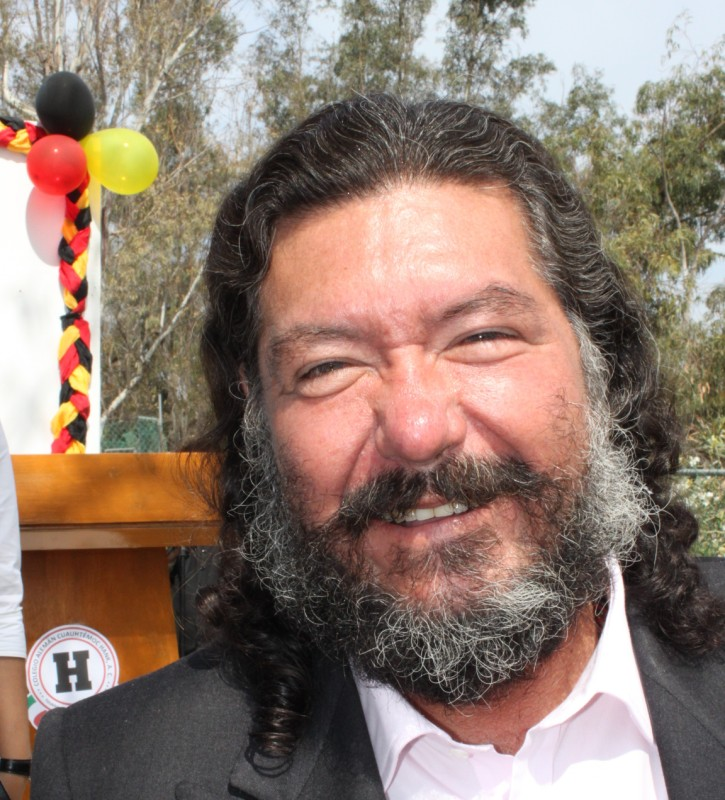

19th Municipal president of Tijuana
- In office 2004–2007
- Preceded by: José de Jesús González Reyes
- Succeeded by: Kurt Honold

Personal details
- Born: January 28, 1956 (age 70) Toluca, Estado de México
- Party: PRI
- Spouse(s): María Elvia Amaya (m. 2004; div. 2007); Carolina Kabande (m. 2018)
- Children: Nirvana Hank Tigre Hank; Jorgealberto Hank Inzunza; Alejandro Amaya B Alexander Hank (Nephew)

Jorge Hank Rhon (born January 28, 1956) is a Mexican businessman and owner of Mexico's largest sports betting company, Grupo Caliente. He served from December 2004 to February 2007 as the president of the municipality of Tijuana. He is the son of former Mexico City mayor Carlos Hank González and Guadalupe Rhon. The Hank family has alleged links to drug trafficking. He has been accused of money laundering, murder, arrested for possession of unlicensed arms and dealing in the trade of exotic animals.

== Biography ==
Jorge Hank Rhon was born in January 28th 1956. He is of German and Spanish descent. Hank Rhon studied at the Alexander von Humboldt German College and Industrial Engineering at the Universidad Anáhuac in the State of Mexico. In 1980 he founded the Grupo Taos, a company that operates pet stores and amusement parks of which he is the president of the board and general director. He moved to Tijuana in 1985 to manage the Agua Caliente Racetrack and formed the Grupo Caliente which includes the dog racing track, a hotel, a mall and a network of entertainment centers in 19 states of Mexico as well as 13 countries of Central, South America and Europe. The number of employees of the racetrack grew from 700 to close to 6,000. During his management Tijuana has hosted the Señorita México pageant, the World Boxing title fight between Julio César Chávez and Danilo Cabrera and from 1986 to 1988 the Caribe International Classic Horserace, considered the most important in Latin America. The Racetrack also hosts the Day of the Three Wise Men, Children's Day, Mother's Day where thousands of children and their mothers receive free food, gifts and an entertainment show since 1988. Hank also created the Cuauhtémoc Hank Foundation to give scholarships to students of all grades including studies in foreign schools. On April 20, 1988, a local newspaper columnist, Hector "El Gato" Félix Miranda was assassinated on his way to work. The gunmen turned out to be security guards at the Caliente track, and one had worked as well for Hank Rhon's father, Carlos Hank Gonzalez. To this day the independent news weekly in Tijuana, ZETA, runs a full page ad with white letters: "Jorge Hank: Why did your bodyguards assassinate me?" 'El Gato' had been a fierce critic of the Hank family.

Hank Rhon is the owner of casinos and soccer teams. He is a lover of exotic animals and the father of 23 children, some of whom are named after animals.

== Campaign for municipal president ==
As a candidate for mayor of Tijuana in 2004, Hank said, “Mi animal preferido sigue siendo la mujer”. ("My favorite animal is still the woman.")

Hank won the mayoral race that year, beating PAN candidate Jorge Ramos by a slim margin, thus ending 15 years of PAN government in Tijuana.

== Mayor of Tijuana ==
The most notable infrastructure improvement in Tijuana during the Hank administration was the multi-million investment on an underpass at the Alba Roja intersection, just south of the 5 y 10 intersection. The 5 y 10 intersection is one of the most famous in the city and with the heaviest traffic. The investment was for a figure close to 45 million pesos, more than four million dollars.

On February 8, 2005, the Hank administration inaugurated the five million pesos Center of Communication, Control, Computing and Command (C4) that included 60 high definition cameras. In order the reduce kidnappings, a problem of Tijuana for many years, the municipal government started a program of installing GPS devices on the cars of potential victims. In 2007, a program of road safety cameras was introduced in Tijuana that issued speeding tickets in which some drivers received up to 800 tickets issued the same day, same time, and on the same location.

The Hank administration produced significant urban development but failed to significantly reduce crime In 2007, the Operation Tijuana of the Federal Government only momentarily reduced serious crimes and ordinary crimes increased 40% and it was detected corruption amongst the federal forces. The operation was then extended to the five municipalities of the state and dubbed Operation Baja California, per request of the governor Eugenio Elorduy Walther.

On February 20, 2007, Hank requested a license to leave his post as mayor. The license was approved by nine PRI representatives with six PAN representatives rejecting the license and one PRD representative abstaining from voting. Multiple billboards reporting Hank actions as mayor were put out after the annual report and PAN representative complained and offered to remove the PAN-sponsored radio spots on fighting radar camera-issued tickets.

== Runs for governor of Baja California ==
=== 2007 ===
At the end of 2006, Jorge Hank expressed his wishes to run a campaign for the 2007 Baja California state election. This flared up comments from PAN politicians saying that he would be violating the state's Antichapulin ("anti-grasshopper") law which prohibits a person of public office to "jump" from one charge to another without ending their current term.

In February 2007, he requested permission to leave his post as municipal president and accept the candidacy for governor by the Alianza para que vivas mejor (The Alliance So You May live better), which was approved by his party's regidores and denied by the PAN regidores. The PAN also accused five district electoral council members of partiality toward Hank because they served as judges during his administration as president of Tijuana. The Federal Electoral Tribune rejected the complaint determining that the law does not have such restriction that would prevent these five lawyers from serving as judges and then as council members.

On June 20, 2007, Baja California's state elections court voted 2 to 1 in favor of the validity of the so-called "anti-grasshopper law" thus cancelling Hank's bid for governor. He appealed the decision before the Federal Electoral Tribunal, which unanimously upheld his candidacy on July 7, holding the state law contravened the electoral and political rights of the citizenry. Pending that decision, Hank was not a registered candidate and had to abstain from campaigning. The election date was on August 5, 2007.

According to the Baja California's State Electoral Institute, Jorge Hank lost the election by 8 points (almost 55,000 votes) to Jose Guadalupe Osuna Millan, PAN's candidate.

Preceded by José de Jesús González Reyes	Municipal president of Tijuana; 2004–2007	Succeeded by Kurt Honold

=== 2021 ===
Alfredo Ferreiro Velasco, leader of PES announced on January 26, 2021, that Jorge Hank Rhon would be its candidate for governor in 2021. As a candidate for governor, Hank Rhon said of women “[S]e les ha bajado un poquito la inteligencia” ("Their intelligence has lowered a little").

== See also ==
- José Guadalupe Osuna Millán — The PAN candidate for governor in 2007
- 2007 Baja California state election
- 2021 Baja California state election
