= Tijuana Cultural Center =

- Centro Cultural Tijuana
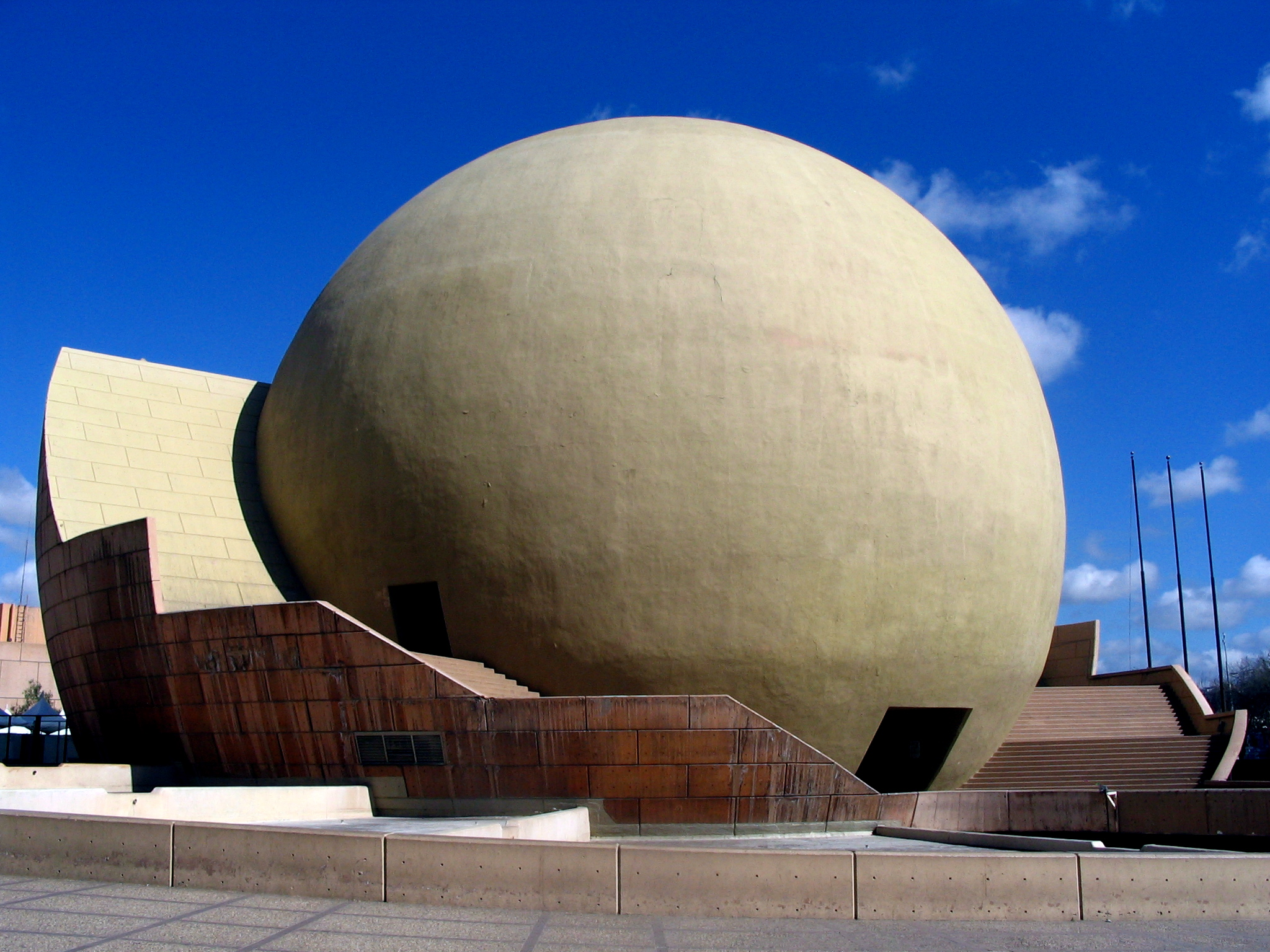
- Established: 20 October 1982
- Location: Tijuana, Mexico
- Coordinates: 32°31′48″N 117°01′26″W
- Type: Cultural center
- Collections: Museo de las Californias
- Website: www.cecut.gob.mx

The Tijuana Cultural Center (CECUT) is a cultural center in the Zona Río district of Tijuana, Mexico. The center opened 20 October 1982, and accommodates more than a million visitors per year.

== Attractions and facilities ==
The centerpiece of the complex is an OMNIMAX cinema designed by architects Pedro Ramirez Vazques and Manuel Rossen Morrison. It is the only IMAX cinema in Tijuana, and has come to be popularly known as La Bola ("The Ball"). The cinema, which uses a 360-degree projector to surround viewers with a panoramic image, has 308 seats.

The OMNIMAX cinema has been part of the cultural center since the complex first opened in 1982. In October of that year, it premiered the film El pueblo del sol, which was made especially for the cinema's opening. The film presents images from the most representative regions of Mexico, and got very good reviews. It was the cinema's only film for 13 years. Today, the center offers a daily selection of films; it premieres about four films per year.

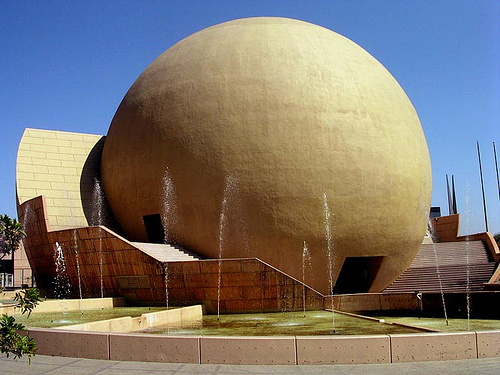
The OMNIMAX cinema

The center encompasses a large esplanade that accommodates up to 6,000 people. The esplanade is a venue for performances, festivals, and expos. There is also a large bookshop that also sells handicrafts and design items.

The permanent exhibition, Museo de las Californias, ("Museum of The Californias"), which houses over 200 pieces and demonstrates the history of the Baja Peninsula and the current U.S. state of California from the prehistoric period until the first half of the 20th century.

Outside there is the pre-Hispanic style garden called Jardin Caracol ("Snail Garden"), that contains sculptures from the different regions of the mesoamerican cultures that inhabited south Mexico before the arrival of the Spanish Army.

There is a small café in the garden.

A theatre has a room for around a thousand visitors and it is mostly used for private concerts and plays. There are also lecture rooms, video room, café, and a bookshop. There are several spaces for temporary small exhibits.

In September 2008, on the eve of its 26th anniversary, CECUT opened El Cubo ("The Cube"), so named because of the contrast between the nickname of the OMNIMAX cinema "The Ball". Since then it has been the home for exhibitions from other countries such as those of Buda Guanyin, Gabriel Figueroa, Alice Rahon, Venus en Tijuana, Proyecto Civico, and Animated Painting among others.

The Cubo Bistro restaurant offers French cuisine organized by celebrity chef Javier Plascencia, considered the greatest contributor to the development of Baja Med cuisine.

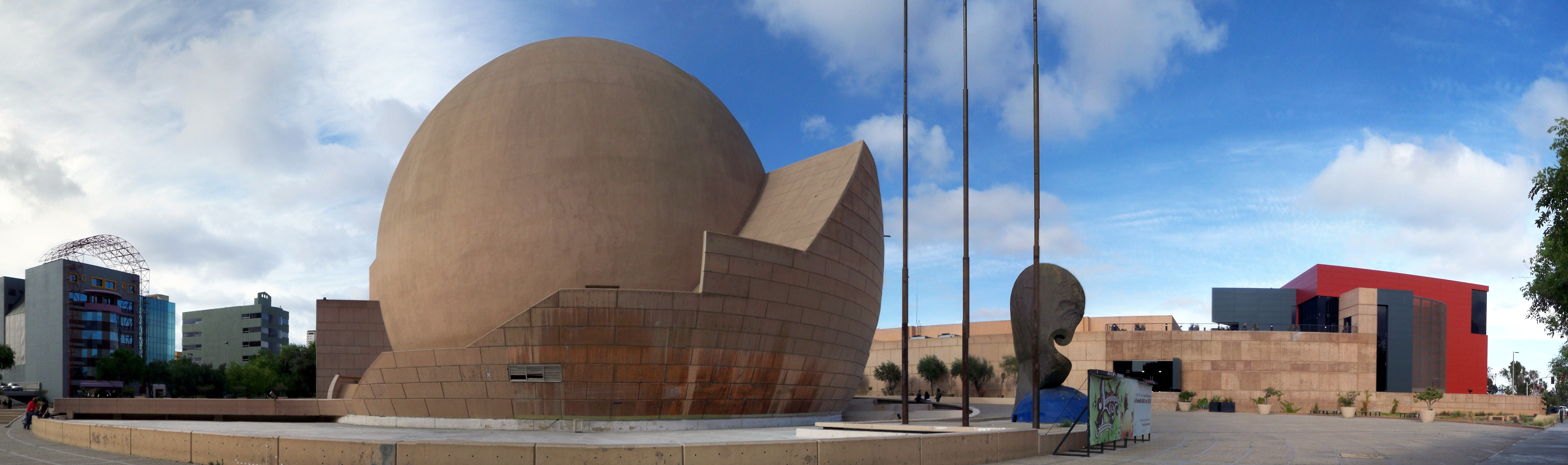

== History and impact ==
The center opened in 1982 with the mission to promote cultural tourism from the US. The building was constructed by the architects Pedro Ramírez Vázquez and Manuel Rosen Morrison. The CECUT first opened as part of the National Fund for Social Activities then in 1983 it was part of the Ministry of Tourism. Later that year CECUT was joined into the Ministry of Public Education. Finally, in 1986 the CECUT gained its own independence, and was able to plan its own budget. In 1988 they changed their actions guiding themselves towards a comprehensive national cultural policy.

CECUT is a 2.1-kilometre (1.3 mi) walk from the east port of entry from San Ysidro to Mexico.
