= Solidarity Encounter Party =

Mexican political party

Solidarity Encounter Party Partido Encuentro Solidario
- Abbreviation: PES
- President: Hugo Eric Flores Cervantes
- Founded: September 4, 2020
- Dissolved: National Level: August 30, 2021
- Preceded by: Social Encounter Party
- Succeeded by: Building Peaceful Societies
- Ideology: Conservatism; Social conservatism Christian right
- Political position: Right-wing
- Colours: Purple, lilac
- Slogan: El Partido de la Familia, la Vida, la Paz y la Reconciliación (The Party of the Family, Life, Peace and Reconciliation)

Website
- pesnacional.org

The Solidarity Encounter Party (Spanish: Partido Encuentro Solidario, PES) is a state-level political party in Mexico. The party president is Hugo Eric Flores Cervantes.

It is supposed to be the functional replacement for the Social Encounter Party, a Christian-oriented, social conservative party which lost its registration after failing to attract sufficient vote share in the 2018 general election.

== History ==
All the structure that is participating today is Encuentro Social ... Basically the structure from 2014 is the same people that are doing the job. There are no changes in the ideology of the party.

— Alejandrina Moreno, national coordinator of the PES, on the organization of the new party

In 2018, the Social Encounter Party, in its second federal election, ran as part of the Juntos Haremos Historia alliance with the National Regeneration Movement (MORENA) and Labor Party (PT). However, despite the alliance electing the winning presidential candidate—Andrés Manuel López Obrador—and the PES winning 35 seats in the Chamber of Deputies and seven in the Senate, its standalone performance was poor. The PES itself failed to attract three percent of the vote in the elections for president, federal deputies, and senators, which under Mexican law prompted the loss of its federal registry and the appointment of a liquidator by the Instituto Nacional Electoral (INE) to dispose of the national party's assets. The Social Encounter Party challenged the result and lost, leading to its dissolution on September 3, 2018.

In March 2019, the Electoral Tribunal of the Federal Judiciary (TEPJF) rendered a final verdict upholding the party's dissolution. Hours later, Hugo Eric Flores Cervantes announced the registration of a new national political group under the name Partido Encuentro Solidario, using the same initials and relying on the political infrastructure and party base developed by its now-defunct predecessor. State- and district-level assemblies were held throughout 2019 and early 2020 to meet the federal registration requirements, with 263 district assemblies having taken place by November 2019.

Despite meeting the registration requirements, concern arose at the INE about the open participation of 15 registered religious ministers in six district assemblies and Christian organizations, barred from political activity under the law. The result was a marathon session of the INE's General Council on September 5, 2020, which resulted in the board approving the registration of the new PES as a political party on a 6–5 vote; the majority voted to annul only the relevant assemblies, which still left the party over the minimum requirements of members and assemblies. Lorenzo Córdova Vianello, the head of the institute, called the involvement of religious ministers in party events "a direct and grave violation of the Constitution". INE councilor Ciro Murayama expressed dismay at the vote, highlighting that the secular state had been damaged and "the legacy of [Benito] Juárez emerges damaged" from the decision. The party's registration was ratified by the TEPJF after it denied a challenge by the National Action Party to the INE decision on a 6–1 vote in October 2020.

In the 2021 Mexican legislative election, PES achieved less than the 3% of the vote needed to keep its registry as a valid national party, so it lost its registry once again, as it previously did under the guise of the Social Encounter Party. The party lost its official national registration on August 30, 2021. It maintains registration in some states for subnational elections.

== See also ==
- Building Peaceful Societies, the party's successor
