= Congress of Baja California =

Legislature of Baja California, Mexico

Congress of the State of Baja California
- Twenty-fourth legislature of the Congress of Baja California
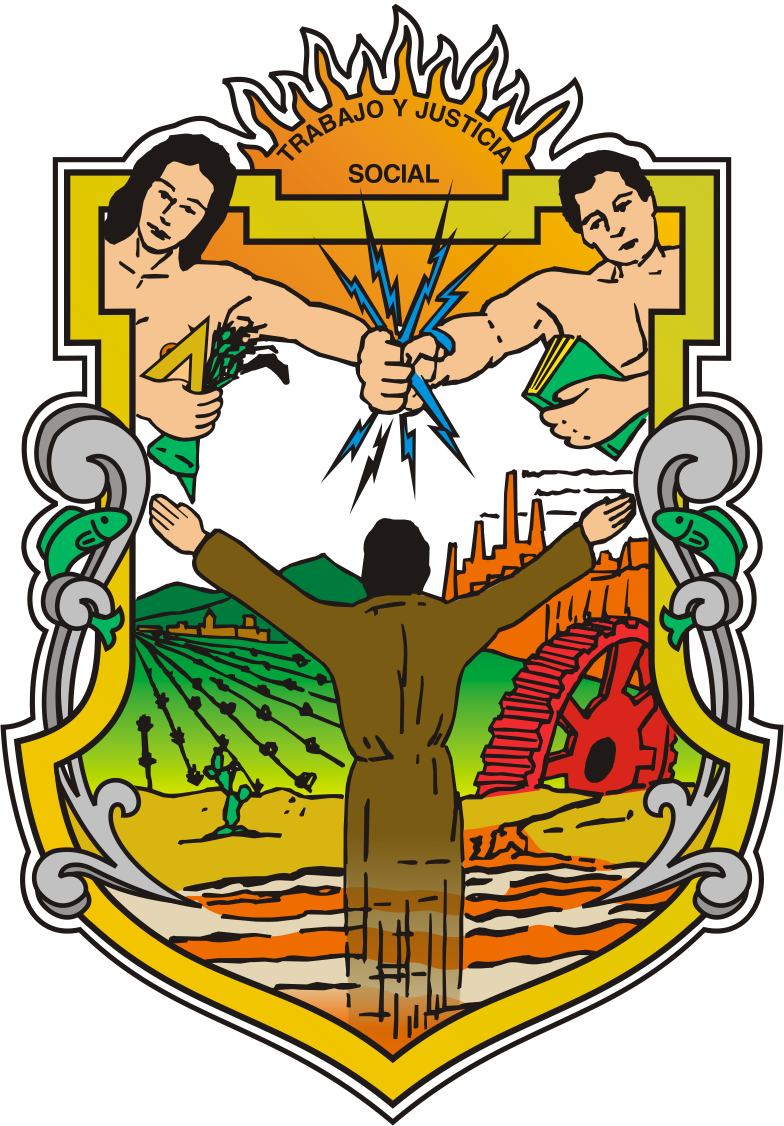

Type
- Type: Unicameral

Leadership
- President: Victor Manuel Moran Hernández, MORENA
- Vice President: María Trinidad Vaca Chacón
- Secretary: Carmen Leticia Hernández Carmona, MORENA
- Pro-secretary: Gerardo López Montes, PRD
- Scrutinizing secretary: Julia Andrea González Quiroz, MORENA

Structure
- Seats: 25
- Political groups: MORENA (15) PAN (3) PVEM (2) FXM (1) PRI (1) MC (1) PES (1) PT (1)
- Authority: Title III, Chapter I, Article 13 of the Political Constitution of the Free and Sovereign State of Baja California
- Salary: $62,226 MXN

Elections
- Voting system: First-past-the-post for 17 electoral district seats and Mixed-member proportional representation for 8 proportional representation seats
- Last election: 2 June 2024
- Next election: 2027

Meeting place
- Mexicali, Baja California, Mexico

Website
- www.congresobc.gob.mx

The Congress of the State of Baja California (Spanish: Congreso del Estado de Baja California) is the legislative branch of the government of the State of Baja California. The Congress is the governmental deliberative body of Baja California, which is equal to, and independent of, the executive.

The Congress is unicameral and consists of 25 deputies. 17 deputies are elected on a first-past-the-post basis, one for each district in which the entity is divided, while 8 are elected through a system of proportional representation. Deputies are elected to serve for a three-year term.

The Congress convenes in the Legislative Power building (edificio del Poder Legislativo), which is located in Mexicali, the capital city of the State.

== Structure ==
In order to carry out its duties, the Congress is organized in the following manner:

- Management bodies (Órganos de Dirección):
  - The Board of Directors;
  - The Political Coordination Board (JUCOPO).
- Working bodies (Órganos de Trabajo):
  - Legislative Advice Committees;
  - Standing Committees.
- Technical and Administrative bodies (Órganos Técnicos y Administrativos):
  - Administrative Department;
  - Accounting and Finance Department;
  - Legislative Consulting Department;
  - Auxiliary Departments:
    - Legal Affairs Unit;
    - Internal Comptroller Unit;
    - Transparency Unit;
    - Social Communication Unit.

== Historical composition ==
This chart shows the historical composition of the Congress of Baja California from the I Legislature to the present. It reflects the party affiliations of deputies at the time of their election and does not account for subsequent party switching.

Congress of Baja California, 1953 to present

PAN / PRI / PPS / PARM / PST / PCM / PSUM / PFCRN / PMS / PRD / PT / PVEM / PBC / MC / PANAL / MORENA / PES / TRANS / FXM			Total
I	1953	7	7
II	1956	7	7
III	1959	7	7
IV	1962	9	9
V	1965	9	9
VI	1968	9	9
VII	1971	11	11
VIII	1974	11	11
IX	1977	11	11
X	1980	1 / 12 / 2	15
XI	1983	1 / 1 / 1 / 13	16
XII	1986	1 / 1 / 1 / 14 / 2	19
XIII	1989	1 / 1 / 1 / 1 / 6 / 9	19
XIV	1992	4 / 7 / 8	19
XV	1995	2 / 11 / 13	26
XVI	1998	3 / 11 / 11	25
XVII	2001	3 / 9 / 1 / 12	25
XVIII	2004	3 / 1 / 8 / 1 / 12	25
XIX	2007	1 / 2 / 10 / 1 / 10 / 1	25
XX	2010	1 / 1 / 1 / 2 / 13 / 1 / 6	25
XXI	2013	2 / 1 / 2 / 2 / 2 / 7 / 1 / 7 / 1	25
XXII	2016	1 / 2 / 1 / 1 / 1 / 5 / 13 / 1	25
XXIII	2019	2 / 13 / 1 / 1 / 1 / 1 / 1 / 4 / 1	25
XXIV	2021	3 / 13 / 1 / 1 / 1 / 3 / 3	25
XXV	2024	1 / 15 / 1 / 1 / 1 / 2 / 3 / 1	25

== See also ==
- List of Mexican state congresses
