= Social Encounter Party =

Mexican conservative political party

Social Encounter Party Partido Encuentro Social
- President: Hugo Eric Flores Cervantes
- Founded: 30 October 2006; 19 years ago (regional); 9 July 2014; 12 years ago (national)
- Dissolved: September 3, 2018; 8 years ago (national level)
- Succeeded by: Solidarity Encounter Party
- Headquarters: Mexico City
- Ideology: Ultraconservatism; Conservatism; Social conservatism Christian right
- Political position: Right-wing to far-right
- Colors: Indigo
- Politics of Mexico; Political parties; Elections; A: Also described as centre-right and far-right

Social Encounter Party (Spanish: Partido Encuentro Social, PES) was a Mexican conservative political party established on the national level in 2014 and dissolved in 2018. It was part of the coalition Juntos Haremos Historia with the National Regeneration Movement and Mexico's Labor Party for the 2018 Mexican election.

It preceded the Solidarity Encounter Party, established as its replacement in 2019 and granted national party status in 2020.

== History ==
The Social Encounter Party was founded in 2006 by Dr. Hugo Eric Flores Cervantes, a pastor of a Neo-Pentecostal church that supported Felipe Calderón in the 2006 presidential election. It had previously been a "national political grouping", which does not receive public funding. The party made many of its early successes in the state of Baja California. In 2007, it supported the successful candidacy of José Guadalupe Osuna Millán of the PAN, but in 2013, it allied with the PRI in Baja California instead, which led it to elect a state deputy to a district in Tecate and four council members in Tijuana.

In July 2014, it obtained federal registry. After doing so, eight of its nine political assemblies were nullified, as bribes were given to attendees.

The party was primarily composed of Evangelical Christians, though it has declared itself as "not religious" in character.

=== 2015 Mexican legislative elections ===
The 2015 legislative elections was the first election where PES participated at a federal level. It managed to obtain eight proportional representation seats in the Chamber of Deputies as a result of obtaining 3.3 percent of the vote.

=== 2018 Mexican general elections ===
The 2018 Mexican general election was the first general election where the PES participated with a candidate aspiring for the presidency, as the party formed a coalition with left-wing National Regeneration Movement (MORENA) and Labor Party (PT). The parties nominated Andrés Manuel López Obrador as their presidential candidate.

==== Coalition with MORENA ====
On 24 June 2017, the PT approved to stand for election in 2018 in an electoral alliance with MORENA; however the coalition was not officially registered before the National Electoral Institute, the electoral authorities of the country. For MORENA, the alliance was facilitated as a result of Óscar González Yáñez, the PT gubernatorial candidate in the State of Mexico, withdrawing from the race and endorsing MORENA candidate Delfina Gómez Álvarez.

At first, there was speculation about the possibility of a front grouping all the leftist parties: MORENA, PRD, PT and Citizens' Movement (MC). However, Andrés Manuel López Obrador rejected any kind of agreement due to political differences, especially after the elections in the State of Mexico, when the candidates of the PRD and MC continued with their campaigns refusing to support the candidate of MORENA. At the end of November 2017, the leaders of MORENA and the PES announced that they were in talks to form a possible alliance. In this sense, Hugo Eric Flores said, "We don't negotiate with the PRI, we have two options, go alone or with MORENA."

===== Confirmation =====
On December 13, the coalition between MORENA, the PT and the PES was formalized under the name Juntos Haremos Historia (English: Together we will make history). Following the signing of the agreement, Andrés Manuel López Obrador was appointed as a pre-candidate for the three political formations. It was a partial coalition that promoted López Obrador as a presidential candidate and, with respect to the legislative elections: MORENA was assigned to choose candidates in 150 federal electoral districts and 32 districts to the Senate; PT was assigned to choose 75 deputies and 16 senators, and the PES was assigned to choose 75 deputies and 16 senators.

The alliance has received criticism as it was a coalition between two leftist parties (MORENA and the PT) with a formation related to the evangelical right (PES). In response, the national president of MORENA, Yeidckol Polevnsky, mentioned that her party believes in inclusion, joint work to "rescue Mexico" and that they will continue to defend human rights, while Hugo Eric Flores Cervantes, national president of the PES, mentioned that "the only possibility of real change in our country is the one headed by Andrés Manuel López Obrador" and that his party had decided to be "on the right side of history."

Results and dissolution

The results for the Juntos Haremos Historia coalition were strong; López Obrador was elected president in a landslide victory, as well as winning five of the nine state governorships (one of them for PES candidate Cuauhtémoc Blanco in Morelos), and the coalition resulted in the election of 55 federal deputies and 7 senators belonging to the party. However, the party failed to attract three percent of the vote in the elections for president, federal deputies, and senators, which under Mexican law prompts the loss of its federal registry and the appointment of a liquidator by the INE to dispose of the national party's assets. The PES and New Alliance Party, the other party to lose its registry after the 2018 elections, challenged the results to no avail and on 3 September 2018, the party was dissolved as it had not reached the 3% of the national vote.

=== Reincarnation in 2020 ===
PES was reborn as the Solidarity Encounter Party (Partido Encuentro Solidario), using the same initials, and granted preliminary recognition to participate in the 2021 Mexican legislative election on September 2, 2020.

== Policy positions ==
The PES tended to include many strands of Christian humanist thought and was generally socially conservative, and Flores has stated that it was a "family" party. The Baja California state party used a stylized ichthys in its logo, which was not used by the national organization.

The party characterized itself as the "party of the family". It opposed same-sex marriage and was responsible for reforms to the Baja California constitution in 2008 that established marriage as "between one man and one woman". In 2015, the PES gubernatorial candidate in the state of San Luis Potosí compared homosexuality to drug trafficking and violence. Likewise, it opposed abortion and pornographic magazines.

Other proposals made by the PES included shifting the collection of value-added tax to the states instead of the federal government and consolidating it with income tax.

== Electoral history ==
=== Presidential elections ===
Election year	Candidate	Votes	%	Outcome	Notes
2018	Andrés Manuel López Obrador	30,113,483	53.19%	✓ Elected	From a different party of its coalition

=== Congressional elections ===
==== Chamber of Deputies ====
Election year	Constituency		PR		# of seats	Position	Presidency	Note
Election year	votes	%	votes	%	# of seats	Position	Presidency	Note
2015	1,319,203	3.49	1,325,335	3.32	8 / 500	Minority	Enrique Peña Nieto	
2018	1,056,918	2.41	1,353,941	2.40	56 / 500	Minority	Andrés Manuel López Obrador	Coalition: Juntos Haremos Historia
See Solidarity Encounter Party

==== Senate elections ====
Election year	Constituency		PR		# of seats	Position	Presidency	Note
Election year	votes	%	votes	%	# of seats	Position	Presidency	Note
2018	1,038,325	2.35	1,320,559	2.33	8 / 128	Minority	Andrés Manuel López Obrador	Coalition: Juntos Haremos Historia
See Solidarity Encounter Party

== See also ==
- National Action Party (Mexico)
- National Synarchist Union
- Politics of Mexico
- Evangelical political parties in Latin America
