= 1964 in Mexico =

- Decades: 1940s; 1950s; 1960s; 1970s; 1980s
- See also: History of Mexico; List of years in Mexico; Timeline of Mexican history

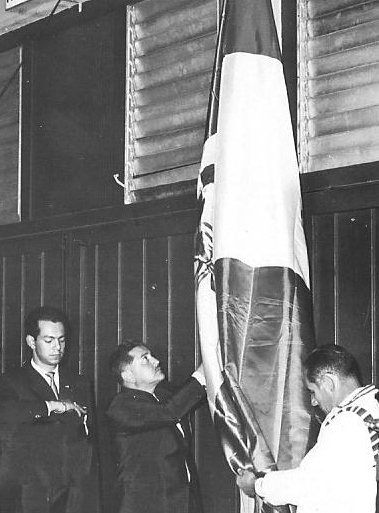
Guillermo Allier at the raising of the Mexican flag, in Mexico's debut against Japan, in the 1964 Thomas Cup

Events in the year 1964 in Mexico.

== Incumbents ==
=== Federal government ===
- President: Adolfo López Mateos (until November 30), Gustavo Díaz Ordaz (starting December 1)
- Interior Secretary (SEGOB): Luis Echeverría Álvarez
- Secretary of Foreign Affairs (SRE): Manuel Tello Baurraud/José Gorostiza/Antonio Carrillo Flores
- Communications Secretary (SCT): Walter Cross Buchanan/José Antonio Padilla Segura
- Education Secretary (SEP): Jaime Torres Bodet/Agustín Yáñez
- Secretary of Defense (SEDENA): Agustín Olachea/Marcelino García Barragan
- Secretary of Navy: Manuel Zermeño Araico/Antonio Vázquez del Mercado
- Secretary of Labor and Social Welfare: Salomón González Blanco
- Secretary of Welfare: Javier Barros Sierra/Gilberto Valenzuela

=== Supreme Court ===
- President of the Supreme Court: Alfonso Guzmán Neyra

=== Governors ===
- Aguascalientes: Enrique Olivares Santana
- Baja California
  - Eligio Esquivel Méndez (died in office, December 17.
  - Gustavo Aubanel Vallejo (Substitute)
- Campeche: José Ortiz Avila
- Chiapas: Práxedes Ginér Durán
- Chihuahua: Braulio Fernández Aguirre
- Coahuila: Braulio Fernández Aguirre
- Colima: Francisco Velasco Curiel
- Durango: Enrique Dupré Ceniceros
- Guanajuato: Juan José Torres Landa
- Guerrero: Raymundo Abarca Alarcón
- Hidalgo: Carlos Ramírez Guerrero
- Jalisco: Juan Gil Preciado/José de Jesús Muñoz Limón
- State of Mexico: Juan Fernández Albarrán
- Michoacán: Agustín Arriaga
- Morelos: Emilio Riva Palacio
- Nayarit: Julián Gazcón Mercado
- Nuevo León: Eduardo Livas Villarreal
- Oaxaca: Rodolfo Brena Torres
- Puebla: Arturo Fernández Aguirre
- Querétaro: Manuel González Cosío
- San Luis Potosí: Manuel López Dávila
- Sinaloa: Leopoldo Sánchez Celis
- Sonora: Luis Encinas Johnson
- Tabasco: Carlos A. Madrazo Becerra
- Tamaulipas: Praxedis Balboa
- Tlaxcala: Anselmo Cervantes
- Veracruz: Fernando López Arias
- Yucatán: Agustín Franco Aguilar/Luis Torres Mesías
- Zacatecas: José Rodríguez Elías
- Regent of the Federal District: Ernesto P. Uruchurtu

== Events ==
- La Preparatoria Benemérito de las Américas is founded by Albert Kenyon Wagner and his wife, Leona Farnsworth Romney
- Amusement park La Feria Chapultepec Mágico opens its doors.
- Museo Nacional de Antropología, Museo de Arte Moderno and the Alfredo Guati Rojo National Watercolor Museum are established.
- 1964 Mexican general election

== Awards ==
- Belisario Domínguez Medal of Honor – Adrián Aguirre Benavides

== Births ==
- February 4 — Luis Alegre Salazar, businessman and politician (d. 2022)
- June 13 — Edith González, actress and dancer (d. 2019)
- August 5
  - Miguel Ángel Osorio Chong, Governor of Hidalgo 2005–2011 and Secretary of the Interior 2012–2018.
  - Claudio Reyes Rubio, TV director (Televisa); auto accident; (d. 2017).
- August 11 — Héctor Soberón, actor
- October 9 — Guillermo del Toro, filmmaker (three Academy Awards), author, and actor.
- November 14 — Raúl Araiza, actor and TV presenter
- November 30 - Emmanuel Lubezki, Cinematographer (three Academy Awards)
- November 23 — Erika Buenfil, television actress (Tres Mujeres, Amores Verdaderos)
- Date unknown
  - Martín Barrón Félix, physicist and meteorologist (d. 2017)

== Deaths ==
- August 12 — Isidro Fabela, judge, writer, publisher, Governor of the State of Mexico (PRI, 1942–1945), diplomat (b. 1882)

== Film ==
- List of Mexican films of 1964

== Sport ==
- 1963–64 Mexican Primera División season
- Football Club Petroleros de Ciudad Madero is founded
- 1964 Mexican Grand Prix
- Mexico at the 1964 Summer Olympics
