= 1962 in Mexico =

- Decades: 1940s; 1950s; 1960s; 1970s; 1980s
- See also: History of Mexico; List of years in Mexico; Timeline of Mexican history

Events in the year 1962 in Mexico.

== Incumbents ==
=== Federal government ===
- President: Adolfo López Mateos
- Interior Secretary (SEGOB): Gustavo Díaz Ordaz
- Secretary of Foreign Affairs (SRE): Manuel Tello Baurraud
- Communications Secretary (SCT): Walter Cross Buchanan
- Education Secretary (SEP): Jaime Torres Bodet
- Secretary of Defense (SEDENA): Agustín Olachea
- Secretary of Navy: Manuel Zermeño Araico/Antonio Vázquez del Mercado
- Secretary of Labor and Social Welfare: Salomón González Blanco
- Secretary of Welfare: Javier Barros Sierra

=== Supreme Court ===
- President of the Supreme Court: Alfonso Guzmán Neyra

=== Governors ===
- Aguascalientes
  - Luis Ortega Douglas (until November 30)
  - Enrique Olivares Santana (starting December 1)
- Baja California: Eligio Esquivel Méndez
- Campeche: José Ortiz Avila
- Chiapas: Samuel León Brindis
- Chihuahua: Teófilo Borunda/Práxedes Ginér Durán
- Coahuila: Raúl Madero González
- Colima: Francisco Velasco Curiel
- Durango: Francisco González de la Vega/Rafael Hernández Piedras/Enrique Dupré Ceniceros
- Guanajuato: Juan José Torres Landa
- Guerrero: Arturo Martínez Adame
- Hidalgo: Oswaldo Cravioto Cisneros
- Jalisco: Juan Gil Preciado
- State of Mexico: Gustavo Baz
- Michoacán: David Franco Rodríguez/Agustín Arriaga
- Morelos: Norberto López Avelar
- Nayarit: Francisco García Montero
- Nuevo León: Eduardo Livas Villarreal
- Oaxaca: Alfonso Pérez Gasca/Rodolfo Brena Torres
- Puebla: Arturo Fernández Aguirre
- Querétaro: Manuel González Cosío
- San Luis Potosí: Manuel López Dávila
- Sinaloa: Gabriel Leyva Velásquez
- Sonora: Luis Encinas Johnson
- Tabasco: Carlos A. Madrazo Becerra
- Tamaulipas: Norberto Treviño Zapata
- Tlaxcala: Joaquín Cisneros Molina
- Veracruz: Antonio María Quirasco/Fernando López Arias
- Yucatán: Agustín Franco Aguilar/José Rodríguez Elías
- Zacatecas: Francisco E. García
- Regent of the Federal District: Ernesto P. Uruchurtu

== Events ==
- March 21: Beginning of the 1962 Mexico City radiation accident
- April 30: Roman Catholic Diocese of Apatzingan established.
- May 23: Rubén Jaramillo is assassinated in Morelos by the Mexican Army.

== Awards ==
Belisario Domínguez Medal of Honor – María Tereza Montoya

== Film ==
- List of Mexican films of 1962

== Sport ==
- 1961–62 Mexican Primera División season
- 1962 Mexican Grand Prix
- Mexico defeats Yugoslavia in the Americas Zone final of the 1962 Davis Cup
- 1962 World Modern Pentathlon Championships are held in Mexico City.

== Births ==
- April 24 — Juan Manuel Carreras, Governor of San Luis Potosí starting 2015.
- May 7 — Ari Telch, soap opera actor
- May 13 — Eduardo Palomo, actor (d. 2003)
- May 17 — Arturo Peniche, soap opera actor
- May 31 — Victoria Ruffo, soap opera actress
- June 24 — Claudia Sheinbaum, scientist and Mayor of Mexico City starting 2018
- August 7 – Miroslava Breach, journalist (La Jornada and El Norte de Chihuahua) (d. 2017).
- August 12 – Ariel López Padilla, actor
- August 15 — Mario Anguiano Moreno, Governor of Colima 2009-2015
- August 18 – Felipe Calderón, 56th President of Mexico (2006-2012)
- August 26 — Omar Fayad, Governor of Hidalgo starting 2016
- September 23 — Alberto Estrella, actor
- October 23 — Quirino Ordaz Coppel, lawyer and politician (PRI); Governor of Sinaloa 2017–2021

== Deaths ==
- May 23 — Rubén Jaramillo, military and peasant leader in Morelos, assassinated (b. 1900)
