= 1968 in Mexico =

- Decades: 1940s; 1950s; 1960s; 1970s; 1980s
- See also: History of Mexico; List of years in Mexico; Timeline of Mexican history

Events in the year 1968 in Mexico.

== Incumbents ==
=== Federal government ===
- President: Gustavo Díaz Ordaz
- Interior Secretary (SEGOB): Luis Echeverría Álvarez
- Secretary of Foreign Affairs (SRE): Antonio Carrillo Flores
- Communications Secretary (SCT): José Antonio Padilla Segura
- Education Secretary (SEP): Agustín Yáñez
- Secretary of Defense (SEDENA): Matías Ramos
- Secretary of Navy: Antonio Vázquez del Mercado
- Secretary of Labor and Social Welfare: Salomón González Blanco
- Secretary of Welfare: Gilberto Valenzuela/Luis Enrique Bracamontes

=== Supreme Court ===
- President of the Supreme Court: Agapito Pozo Balbás

=== Governors ===
- Aguascalientes
  - Enrique Olivares Santana (until November 30)
  - Francisco Guel Jiménez (starting December 1)
- Baja California: Raúl Sánchez Díaz Martell
- Campeche: Carlos Sansores Pérez
- Chiapas: José Castillo Tielemans
- Chihuahua: Oscar Flores Sánchez
- Coahuila: Braulio Fernández Aguirre
- Colima: Pablo Silva García
- Durango: Alejandro Páez Urquidi
- Guanajuato: Manuel M. Moreno
- Guerrero: Raymundo Abarca Alarcón
- Hidalgo: Carlos Ramírez Guerrero
- Jalisco: Francisco Medina Ascencio
- State of Mexico:
- Michoacán: Agustín Arriaga/Carlos Gálvez Betancourt
- Morelos: Emilio Riva Palacio
- Nayarit: Julián Gazcón Mercado
- Nuevo León: Eduardo Elizondo
- Oaxaca: Rodolfo Brena Torres
- Puebla: Aarón Merino Fernández
- Querétaro: Juventino Castro Sánchez
- San Luis Potosí: Antonio Rocha Cordero
- Sinaloa: Leopoldo Sánchez Celis
- Sonora: Faustino Félix Serna
- Tabasco: Manuel R. Mora Martínez
- Tamaulipas: Praxedis Balboa
- Tlaxcala: Anselmo Cervantes
- Veracruz: Fernando López Arias/Rafael Murillo Vidal
- Yucatán: Luis Torres Mesías
- Zacatecas: José Rodríguez Elías/Pedro Ruiz González
- Regent of the Federal District: Alfonso Corona del Rosal

== Events ==
- October 2 – around 10,000 university and high school students gathered in the Plaza de las Tres Culturas to protest the government's actions and listen peacefully to speeches then the national guard attacked the demonstrations thus generating the Tlatelolco massacre.
- October 12 – October 27 – The Games of the XIX Olympiad are held in Mexico City.
- October 16 – In Mexico City, black American athletes Tommie Smith and John Carlos raise their arms in a black power salute after winning, respectively, the gold and bronze medals in the Olympic men's 200 metres.

== Awards ==
- Belisario Domínguez Medal of Honor – Miguel Angel Cevallos

== Notable births ==
- February 9
  - Ana Colchero, actress and economist
  - Alejandra Guzman, singer and actress
- February 15 – Gloria Trevi, singer and actress
- April 18 — Cuitláhuac García Jiménez, politician (Morena); Governor of Veracruz starting 2018
- June 30 — Rafael Moreno Valle Rosas, Governor of Puebla 2011-2017 (d. 2018)
- July 15 – Leticia Calderon, actress
- July 27 – Jorge Salinas, actor
- August 11 — Rolando Zapata Bello, politician (PRI); Governor of Yucatán 2012–2018
- September 22 – Eve Gil, writer
- November 7 – Ignacio Padilla, writer, co-founder of Crack Movement (d. August 20, 2016).
- November 11 — Miguel Márquez Márquez, Governor of Guanajuato 2012-2018
- November 28 – Ana Maria Alvarado, journalist
- December 12 – Tatiana, singer
- December 17 – Claudio Suarez, former soccer player (FIFA World Cup 1994, 1998, 2006)
- Date unknown — Rubén Díaz Alcántara, Catholic priest, (d. 2018).

== Notable deaths ==
- January 15 – Firpo Segura, Mexican boxer and wrestler.
- October 2 — Deaths related to the Tlatelolco massacre vary between 26 (official figure), and 325 (Octavio Paz)
- October 30 – Ramon Novarro, Mexican actor (born 1899).
