= 1966 in Mexico =

- Decades: 1940s; 1950s; 1960s; 1970s; 1980s
- See also: History of Mexico; List of years in Mexico; Timeline of Mexican history

Events in the year 1966 in Mexico.

== Incumbents ==
- President — Gustavo Díaz Ordaz (1911–1979), president 1964–1970

=== Cabinet ===
- Interior Secretary: Luis Echeverría Álvarez
- Foreign Affairs Secretary: Antonio Carrillo Flores
- Defense Secretary: General Marcelino García Barragan
- Navy Secretary: Antonio Vázquez del Mercado
- Treasury Secretary: Antonio Ortiz Mena
- Secretary of Communications and Transportation: José Antonio Padilla Segura
- Education Secretary: Agustín Yáñez
- Attorney General of Mexico: Antonio Rocha Cordero
- Regent of the Federal District Department: Ernesto P. Uruchurtu

=== Supreme Court ===
- President: Agapito Pozo Balbás

=== Governors ===
- Aguascalientes: Enrique Olivares Santana
- Baja California: Raúl Sánchez Díaz Martell
- Campeche: José Ortiz Avila
- Chiapas: José Castillo Tielemans
- Chihuahua: Práxedes Ginér Durán
- Coahuila: Braulio Fernández Aguirre
- Colima: Francisco Velasco Curiel
- Durango: Enrique Dupré Ceniceros/Ángel Rodríguez Solórzano
- Guanajuato: Juan José Torres Landa
- Guerrero: Raymundo Abarca Alarcón
- Hidalgo: Carlos Ramírez Guerrero
- Jalisco: Francisco Medina Ascencio
- State of Mexico: Juan Fernández Albarrán
- Michoacán: Agustín Arriaga
- Morelos: Emilio Riva Palacio
- Nayarit: Julián Gazcón Mercado
- Nuevo León: Eduardo Elizondo
- Oaxaca: Rodolfo Brena Torres
- Puebla: Antonio Nava Castillo/Aarón Merino Fernández
- Querétaro: Manuel González Cosío
- San Luis Potosí: Manuel López Dávila
- Sinaloa: Leopoldo Sánchez Celis
- Sonora: Luis Encinas Johnson
- Tabasco: Manuel R. Mora Martínez
- Tamaulipas: Praxedis Balboa
- Tlaxcala: Anselmo Cervantes
- Veracruz: Fernando López Arias
- Yucatán: Luis Torres Mesías
- Zacatecas: José Rodríguez Elías
- South Territory of Baja California: Rufo Figueroa Figueroa
- Federal Territory of Quintana Roo: Hugo Cervantes del Río

== Awards ==
- Belisario Domínguez Medal of Honor –
- National Prize for Arts and Sciences in History, Social Sciences, and Philosophy:

== Notable births ==
- January 4 – La Parka II, luchador (d. 2020)
- May 9 – José Aarón Alvarado Nieves, professional wrestler (d. 1999)
- May 22 – Francisco Blake Mora, politician (d. 2011)
- July 16 – Arkangel de la Muerte, professional wrestler (d. 2018)
- July 20 – Enrique Peña Nieto, President of Mexico 2012-2018
- August 17 – Daniela Castro, actress and singer
- October 13 – José Ángel Llamas, actor
- October 15 – Jorge Campos, Mexican footballer and coach

== Notable deaths ==
- January 17: Manuel González Serrano, painter (b. 1917)
