= Juan Fernández =

Juan Fernández may refer to:

== Arts and entertainment ==
- Juan Fernández Navarrete (1526–1579), Spanish mannerist painter
- Juan Fernández el Labrador (died 1657), Spanish painter
- Juan Fernández de Rojas (1750–1819), Spanish writer and humorist
- Juan Fernández de Alarcón (born 1956), actor from the Dominican Republic
- Juan Fernández Mejías (born 1957), Spanish actor known from La mala educación and 7 días al desnudo
- Juan Carlos Fernández-Nieto (born 1987), Spanish-American pianist

== Politics and law ==
- Juan Fernández de Olivera (1560–1612), governor of Spanish Florida
- Juan Mora Fernández (1784–1854), Costa Rica's first elected head of state
- Juan Manuel Fernández de Jaúregui (1814–1871), Mexican acting governor of Querétaro
- Juan Fernández Sánchez Navarro (born 1977), Mexican politician
- Juan Fernández (politician), American politician
- Juan Fernández Albarrán (1901–1972), Mexican politician

== Religion ==
- Juan Fernández Temiño (died 1556), Spanish Roman Catholic bishop
- Juan Fernández (missionary) (c. 1526 – 1567), Spanish Jesuit lay brother and missionary
- Juan Fernández de Rosillo (1533–1606), Spanish Roman Catholic bishop
- Juan Jacobo Fernandez (1808–1860), Spanish Franciscan friar
- Juan María Fernández y Krohn (born c. 1948), Spanish Traditionalist Catholic priest who tried to assassinate Pope John Paul II in 1982

== Sports ==
=== Association football (soccer) ===
- Juan Fernández (footballer, born 1948), Spanish footballer
- Juan Carlos Fernández (footballer) (born 1946), Bolivian footballer
- Juan Fernández Segui (born 1947), Spanish football manager
- Juan Fernández Marín (born 1957), Spanish football referee
- Juan Fernández Di Alessio (born 1975), Argentine footballer
- Juan Fernández (footballer, born 1980), Argentine football defender
- Juan Fernández (footballer, born 1989), Mexican footballer
- Juan Fernández (footballer, born 1999), Spanish footballer

=== Other sports ===
- Juan Fernández (racing driver) (1930–2020), Spanish racing driver
- Juan Manuel Fernández Ochoa (born 1951), Spanish alpine skier
- Juan Fernández (cyclist) (born 1957), Spanish road racing cyclist
- Juan Fernández (biathlete) (born 1963), Argentine Olympic biathlete
- Juan Fernández Miranda (born 1974), Argentine rugby player
- Juan Carlos Fernández (weightlifter) (born 1976), Colombian weightlifter
- Juan Martín Fernández Lobbe (born 1981), Argentine rugby union footballer
- Juan Fernández La Villa (born 1985), Spanish Olympic field hockey player
- Juan Pablo Fernández (born 1988), Argentine handball player
- Juan Fernández (basketball, born 1990), Argentine basketball player
- Juan Fernández (basketball, born 2002), Argentine basketball player

== Others ==
- Juan Fernández de Heredia (c. 1310 – 1396), Grand Master of the Knights Hospitaller
- Juan Fernández de Híjar y Cabrera (1419–1491), Spanish noble
- Juan Fernández Ladrillero (c. 1490–1559), Spanish explorer
- Juan Fernández (explorer) (c. 1536 – c. 1604), Spanish explorer
- Juan Fernández de Velasco y Tovar, 5th Duke of Frías (c. 1550 – 1613), Spanish nobleman and diplomat
- Juan Manuel Fernández Pacheco, 8th Duke of Escalona (1650–1725), Spanish aristocrat and academician

== Other uses ==
- Gimnasio Juan Fernández Albarrán, Mexican basketball arena
- Juan Fernández firecrown, a hummingbird
- Juan Fernández fur seal, a seal from the Juan Fernández Islands
- Juan Fernández hotspot, a volcanic hotspot
- Juan Fernández Islands, an island group off the coast of Chile
- Juan Fernández (commune), a Chilean commune
- Juan Fernández petrel, Chilean seabird
- Juan Fernández plate, a tectonic plate
- Juan Fernández Ridge, a volcanic island and seamount chain
- Juan Fernandez tit-tyrant, Chilean bird species

== See also ==
- John Fernandez (disambiguation)
