= Héctor Terán Terán =

Mexican politician

11th Governor of Baja California
- In office November 1, 1995 – October 4, 1998
- Preceded by: Ernesto Ruffo Appel
- Succeeded by: Alejandro González Alcocer

Personal details
- Born: April 3, 1931; Moctezuma, Sonora
- Died: October 4, 1998 (aged 67); Mexicali, Baja California
- Political party: National Action Party (PAN)
- Spouse: Alma Corella Gilsamaniego
- Children: 4
- Profession: Lawyer

Héctor Téran Terán (3 April 1931 – 4 October 1998) was a Mexican politician who served as Governor of Baja California from 1995 to 1998. A member of the National Action Party (PAN), he was the second member of his party to govern the state.

== Early life and education ==
Terán Terán was born in Moctezuma, Sonora on April 3, 1931. He received his degree in Large Business Administration from the Centro de Enseñanza Técnica y Superior (CETYS).

== Political career ==
Terán Terán went on to become made leader of his party in the state of Baja California. He was a governor-candidate three times: in 1977, when he lost to the PRI candidate Roberto de la Madrid Romandia; in 1983, when he lost to Xicoténcatl Leyva Mortera; and finally in 1995, when he triumphed, becoming the second PAN governor of Baja California.

Previously, he was a local deputy in the Congress of Baja California between 1980 and 1983; a federal deputy in the 53rd Legislature from 1985 to 1988; and in 1989, Baja California's first governor from the PAN, Ernesto Ruffo Appel, appointed him to the position of Secretario General de Gobierno (State Secretary General), holding this position until 1991 when he was elected to the federal Senate, becoming the first PAN senator in history. He asked the permission of the Senate to be the candidate for Governor of Baja California and won in the 1995 election, assuming his post on November 1 of the same year.

== Death ==
Héctor Terán Terán died of a heart attack in office on October 4, 1998, while exercising on the Governor's Estate.

== See also ==
- Governors of Baja California

Preceded by Ernesto Ruffo Appel	Governor of Baja California; 1995–1998	Succeeded by Alejandro González Alcocer
