= Rufo =

Rufo or RUFO may refer to:

- Rights upon future offers, contract clause
- Rufo (footballer) (born 1993), Spanish footballer
- Rufo (given name)
- Rufo (surname)
