= Eugenio Elorduy Walther =

Mexican politician (1940–2023)

Eugenio Elorduy

13th Governor of Baja California
- In office November 1, 2001 – October 31, 2007
- Preceded by: Alejandro González Alcocer
- Succeeded by: José Guadalupe Osuna

Personal details
- Born: November 21, 1940 Calexico, California, U.S.
- Died: September 23, 2023 (aged 82)
- Party: National Action Party (PAN)
- Spouse: María Elena Blackaller
- Profession: Businessperson

Eugenio Elorduy Walther (Note: In this Hispanic American name, the first or paternal surname is Elorduy and the second or maternal family name is Walther.) (November 21, 1940 – September 23, 2023) was a Mexican politician from the National Action Party (PAN). He was the governor of his adoptive state of Baja California from November 1, 2001, to October 31, 2007.

== Biography ==
Elorduy graduated with honours from the Instituto Tecnologico y de Estudios Superiores de Monterrey (ITESM) in business administration in 1965. He became a member of the National Action Party (PAN) three years later and was elected as a council member in 1968 and state congressman in 1974. He was the Secretary of Finance under Ernesto Ruffo's administration (1989–1995). He was elected as president of the municipality of Mexicali for the 1995-1998 term for the PAN. He was elected on July 8, 2001, as governor of his state representing the PAN (in alliance with the Green Ecologist Party (PVEM)). Walther died on September 23, 2023, at the age of 82.

== Governorship of Baja California ==
In 2007 Elorduy was accused by some members of his party of supporting the primary candidacy of José Guadalupe Osuna; to this he declared that the PAN party would keep the governorship in the next six years.

== Organized crime ==
In a video released by the weekly Zeta, a former commander of the state police accused Antonio Martínez Luna, Baja California's Attorney General, and other members of public security of being involved in activities regarding drug trafficking, homicide, kidnapping, disappearing and hiding of dead bodies, and accepting bribes.

In 2001, Antonio Carmona, Elorduy's chief of police during his mayorship of Mexicali, was sentenced to 36 years of jail for contributing to drug-dealing and organized crime.

== Personal life ==
Elorduy Walther was married to María Elena Blackaller, who served as first lady during his term as governor. They had four children: Mariela, Erika, Eugenio, and Ernesto.

== See also ==
- List of Mexican state governors
- Governor of Baja California
- Baja California
- List of presidents of Mexicali Municipality

Preceded by Alejandro González Alcocer	Governor of Baja California; 2001–2007	Succeeded by José Guadalupe Osuna Millán
Preceded by Francisco Pérez Tejada	Municipal President of Mexicali, Baja California; 1995–1998	Succeeded by Víctor Hermosillo Celada
