= Antonio Carmona (disambiguation) =

Antonio Carmona (born 1965) is a Spanish gypsy singer of flamenco.

Antonio Carmona may also refer to:

- Óscar Carmona (António Óscar Fragoso Carmona, 1869–1951), prime minister and president of Portugal
- Antonio Carmona Añorve (fl. 2001), director of police of Mexicali, later convicted
- Carmona Rodrigues (António Pedro Nobre Carmona Rodrigues, born 1956), Portuguese professor and politician
