= Rulfo =

Rulfo is a surname. Notable people with the surname include:

- Juan Rulfo (1917–1986), Mexican writer, screenwriter, and photographer
- Juan Carlos Rulfo (born 1964), Mexican screenwriter and director, son of Juan

== See also ==
- Juan Carlos García Rulfo (born 1981), Mexican footballer
- Ruffo
