= List of C.D. FAS coaches =

FAS is a Salvadoran sports club based in Santa Ana that is best known for its professional football team playing in the country's top-tier division, the Primera División. Founded in 1947, after the union of all the clubs in Santa Ana (including Unión, Colegio Salesiano San José, Cosmos, RAL, Colón, Santa Lucía and Los 44). Samuel Zaldaña Galdámez the first club president invitied Salvadoran Armando Chacón to become the football team's first official head coach..

As of the end of the 2022 Clausura, FAS have had 50 managers of 12 nationalities, eight of which assumed caretaking roles. A total of 30 managers completed at least one season with the club, and 28 won at least one title. Salvadoran's José Eugenio "Chepito" Castro is FAS's most successful manager with 3 titles, including 2 regional championships and One International title. Peruvian Agustin Castillo holds the record with league titles, with 5 titles.

The current manager is currently Mexican Adrián Sánchez, who succeeded Mexican Cristian Flores after the Clausura 2025 season.

List of Head Coaches of FAS from when the club was formed: FAS have had 49 coaches

Information correct as of the match played on 7 April 2023.

Name	Nat	From	To	Honours	Notes
Armando Chacón	(El Salvador)	1947	1949		First Coach of FAS
Pedro Celestino Dacunha	(Brazil)	1950	1950		First foreign Coach of FAS
Victor Manuel Ochoa	(El Salvador)	1951	1954	2 Primera División	First former player to become coach
Jose Manuel Deras	(El Salvador)	TBD	TBD		
Alberto Cevasco	(Argentina)	January 1958	1959	1 Primera División	
Carbilio Tomasino	(El Salvador)	1961	1961		
César Viccinio	(Argentina)	1961	1962	1 Primera División	
Raúl Miralles	(Argentina)	1962	1963	1 Primera División	Player and coach
Javier Mascaró	(Chile)	1964	1964		
José Giuseppe Rossini	(Italy)	1966	1966		
Gregorio Bundio	(Argentina)	TBD	TBD		
Juan Carlos "El Cacho" Giménez	(Argentina)	1968	1968		
Victor Manuel Ochoa	(El Salvador)	1969	1969		
Eduardo "El Gato" Valdez	(El Salvador)	1969	1969		
Ricardo Mena Laguán	(El Salvador)	1970	1970		
Javier Mascaró	(Chile)	1970	1971		
Max Belloso "Katan" Cubas	(El Salvador)	1972	1974		
Javier Mascaró	(Chile)	1974	December 1974		
Mauricio Mora	(El Salvador)	January 1975	May 1975		
Raúl Miralles	(Argentina)	May 1975	1975		
Oscar Nielzen	(Uruguay)	1976	1976		
José Eugenio "Chepito" Castro/ Juan Fernández Segui	(El Salvador) & (Spain)	1976	1979	2 Primera División; 1 CONCACAF Champions' Cup 1979; 1 Runners up Copa Interamericana	
Juan Francisco Barraza	(El Salvador)	1980	1982	1 Primera División	
Juan Quarterone	(Argentina)	1983	1984	1 Primera División	
Enrique Grey	(Honduras)	1985	1985		
Rubén Amorín	(Uruguay)	1986	1987		
Orlando de León	(Uruguay)	1987	1988		
Marvin Rodriguez	(Costa Rica)	1990	1991		
Juan Carlos Montes	(Argentina)	1991	1992		
Juan Masnik	(Uruguay)	1992	1993		
Hernán Carrasco Vivanco	(Chile)	1993	December 1994		
Saul Lorenzo Rivero	(Uruguay)	January 1995	January 1997	2 Primera División	
Valdeir Vieira	(Brazil)	February 1997	July 1997		
Nelson Brizuela	(Paraguay)	October 1997	July 1998		
Oscar Emigdio Benítez	(El Salvador)	July 1998	May 1999		
Juan Masnik	(Uruguay)	June 1999	September 1999		
Oscar Emigdio Benítez	(El Salvador)	TBD	May 1999		
Rubén Guevara	(El Salvador)	September 1999	December 1999		
Ricardo Mena Laguán	(El Salvador)	January 2000	June 2000		
Odir Jacques	(Brazil)	June 2000	August 2000		
Juan Ramón Paredes	(El Salvador)	August 2000	October 2000		
Cesar Acevedo	(El Salvador)	October 2000	October 2000		
Roberto Abruzzesse	(Brazil)	October 2000	November 2000		
Garabet Avedissian	(Uruguay) (Armenia)	November 2000	April 2001		
Rubén Guevara	(El Salvador)	May 2001	June 2001		
Agustín Castillo	(Peru)	July 2001	September 2005	5 Primera División	
Carlos de los Cobos	(Mexico)	October 2005	May 2006		
Julio Asad	(Argentina)	June 2006	May 2007		
Nelson Ancheta	(El Salvador)	June 2007	December 2008		
Roberto Gamarra	(Argentina)	January 2009	June 2010	1 Primera División	
Alberto Rujana	(Colombia) (Lebanon)	July 2010	September 2010		
Jorge Abrego	(El Salvador)	September 2010	December 2010		
Agustín Castillo	(Peru)	January 2011	June 2011		
Willian Renderos Iraheta	(El Salvador)	July 2011	December 2011		
Ricardo Mena Laguán	(El Salvador)	December 2011	January 2012		
Agustín Castillo	(Peru)	February 2012	December 2012		
Carlos Recinos	(El Salvador)	December 2012	January 2013		
William Osorio	(El Salvador)	February 2013	May 2013		
Jaime de la Pava	(Colombia)	June 2013	December 2013		
Efrain Burgos	(El Salvador)	December 2013	September 2014		
Agustín Castillo	(Peru)	September 2014	December 2015		
Carlos "Ché" Martínez Sequeira	(Argentina)	December 2015	March 2016		
Roberto Gamarra	(Argentina)	March 2016	May 2016		
Osvaldo Escudero	(Argentina)	May 2016	February 2017		
Emiliano Pedrozo	(Argentina)	February 2017	May 2017		
Cristiam Álvarez	(El Salvador)	May 2017	June 2018		
Álvaro de Jesús Gómez	(Colombia)	June 2018	September 2018		
Erick Dowson Prado	(El Salvador)	September 2018	September 2019		
Guillermo Rivera	(El Salvador)	September 2019	March 2020		
Jorge Humberto Rodriguez	(El Salvador)	March 2020	June 2022	1 Primera División	
Octavio Zambrano	(Ecuador)	June 2022	April 2023	1 Primera División	
Efren Mercano (Interim)	(El Salvador)	April 2023	June 2023		
Raul Arias	(Mexico)	June 2023	April 2024		
Richard Preza	(Uruguay)	April 2024	August 2024		
Agustin Castillo	(Peru)	August 2024	February 2025		
David Caneda	(Spain)	February 2025	May 2025		
Cristian Flores	(Mexico)	June 2025	December 2025		
Adrián Sánchez	(Mexico)	December 2025	Present		
TBD	(Mexico)	2025	Present		
