= Gustavo Aubanel Vallejo =

Mexican physician and politician

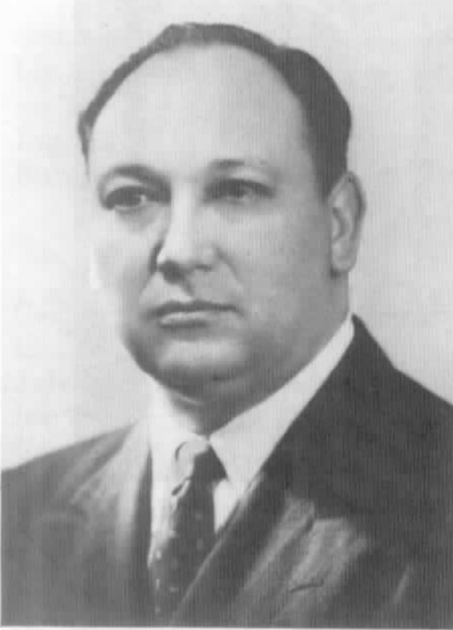
- Governor Vallejo in December 1964

4th Governor of Baja California
- Interim
- In office October 31, 1964 – October 31, 1965
- Preceded by: Eligio Esquivel Méndez
- Succeeded by: Raúl Sánchez Díaz Martell

Senator to the Congress of the Union
- In office September 1, 1970 – August 31, 1976
- Preceded by: Hermenegildo Cuenca Díaz
- Succeeded by: Roberto de la Madrid Romandía

Deputy to the Congress of the Union for the 2nd District of Baja California
- In office September 1, 1967 – August 31, 1970
- Preceded by: Salvador Rosas Magallón
- Succeeded by: Marco Antonio Bolaños Cacho
- In office September 1, 1961 – August 31, 1964
- Preceded by: Germán Brambila Gómez
- Succeeded by: Salvador Rosas Magallón

Municipal President of Tijuana
- In office March 1, 1953 – October 31, 1956
- Preceded by: Position created
- Succeeded by: Manuel Quiros Labastida

Personal details
- Born: July 23, 1901 Guadalajara, Mexico
- Died: September 12, 1987 (aged 86) Mexicali, Mexico
- Party: Institutional Revolutionary Party
- Occupation: Politician, physician

Gustavo Aubanel Vallejo (July 23, 1901 – December 9, 1987) was a Mexican physician and politician who served as the first municipal president of Tijuana and third governor of Baja California from 1964 to 1965, after the death of Eligio Esquivel Méndez.

== Biography ==
Gustavo Aubanel was born on July 23, 1901, in Guadalajara, Jalisco. His parents were José Aubanel and Mercedes Vallejo. After completing his studies in that city, he graduated in 1927 as a surgeon and midwife at the Faculty of Medicine of the University of Guadalajara. He practiced for a time in that region and then moved to Acaponeta, Nayarit and Mexico City.

At the behest of General Agustín Olachea, then governor and military commander of the Northern Territory of Baja California, he moved to Tijuana in 1931. The invitation was to work in the field of medicine, due to the notable lack of public medical services in the border city and for that reason he was appointed director of the Civil and Military Hospital of Tijuana, a position he held for several years. In 1932 and 1943 he was a founding member of the Tijuana Medical Association and in 1950 of the College of Medical Surgeons of Tijuana.

Former Senator Guilebaldo Silva Cota recalled those difficult times when they were concerned about the lack of political rights, because they could not have their laws and choose their rulers. At that time he said that he presented his thesis as a law student which focused on the need to make Baja California a state, which served as support to Dr. Aubanel Vallejo to push the project and finally become a reality.

== Political career ==
In the field of regional politics, Aubanel Vallejo was an important element of the Institutional Revolutionary Party.

During the 1940s and early 1950s, he was one of the Baja Californians who fought to turn the Northern Territory into State 29 of the federation, which happened in 1952. At that time he chaired the Committee for the State of Baja California.

Subsequently, he was the first municipal president of Tijuana, from 1954 to 1956, to then occupy the position of federal deputy for the second district of Baja California, from 1961 to 1964, and later from 1967 to 1970, acting governor of Baja California from December 19, 1964, to November 30, 1965, and senator of the Congress of the Union from 1970 to 1976.
