= Gimnasio Juan Fernández Albarrán =

Indoor arena in Toluca, Mexico

Gimnasio de la Ciudad Deportiva Juan Fernández Albarrán, popularly shortened to Gimnasio de la Ciudad Deportiva or Gimnasio Juan Fernández Albarrán, and also known as Gimnasio de la Ciudad Deportiva de IMCUFIDE, is a 4,000-seat indoor arena located in Toluca, Mexico. It is used primarily for basketball, and is home to the Volcanes del Estado de Mexico basketball team. It was built in 1969 and the Ciudad Deportiva evolved around the arena. Both the arena and complex are named for Juan Fernández Albarrán, the then-governor of Edomex who authorized construction of the arena.

Like most arenas built of its era, it offers concession and restroom facilities for the fans, as well as electronic scoreboards, while facilities for the players include, in addition to the requisite locker rooms, a weight-lifting room. Outside of the arena, there are three outdoor basketball courts.

The Gimnasio is also a concert venue, seating up to 6,000. It has hosted some of Mexico's greatest performers such as Angélica María, César Costa, Enrique Guzmán, Verónica Castro, Antonio Aguilar, Vicente Fernández, Timbiriche, Maribel Guardia, Gloria Trevi, Luis Miguel and Alicia Villarreal.

Other facilities in the Ciudad Deportiva include a 1,000-seat swimming pool, a 1,200-seat outdoor track stadium, the 10,000-seat Estadio Toluca 80, a baseball park which was so named because it was built in 1980, a velodrome, six soccer fields, racquetball, squash and tennis courts, and a 30-room dormitory (El Cemar) that can house up to 120 people.
