= Winton C. Hoch =

American cinematographer

Winton C. Hoch, A.S.C. (/hoʊk/ HOHK) (July 31, 1905 – March 20, 1979) was an American cinematographer. He was earlier a laboratory technician who contributed to the development of Technicolor before becoming a cinematographer in 1936. His understanding of the color process quickly led to his being hailed as one of Hollywood's premier color cinematographers. Hoch never made a film in black and white.

== Biography and filmography ==
Hoch was born July 31, 1905, in Storm Lake, Iowa. Moving to California in 1924 and graduating in 1931 as a chemist from the California Institute of Technology, Hoch was a research physicist who joined the Technicolor company in 1934. His developing and familiarity with the three-color Technicolor process led to work as a cinematographer in the James A. FitzPatrick travelogues.

He won a technical award from the Academy of Motion Picture Arts and Sciences in 1940 for his contributions to the development of improved equipment for process projection.

Hoch's first feature film as an associate cinematographer/Technicolor consultant was Dr. Cyclops, followed by the live-action portions of The Reluctant Dragon and aviation films Dive Bomber and Captains of the Clouds. During World War II, Hoch enlisted in the United States Navy, filming many top secret activities, including work at the atomic testing facilities at Los Alamos.

Following the war, Hoch returned to Hollywood features beginning with Tap Roots. He made his first collaboration with director John Ford in 1948 with 3 Godfathers.

This was followed with back-to-back Academy Awards for the expensive religious epic Joan of Arc in 1948, and then the elegiac John Ford western She Wore a Yellow Ribbon in 1949 (an achievement that went unmatched until John Toll picked up Oscars for Legends of the Fall in 1994 and Braveheart in 1995).

He received his third Oscar in 1952 for another collaboration with John Ford, this time on the film The Quiet Man, which made him the only cinematographer to share an Oscar with a credited second unit cinematographer, Archie Stout. Filming of The Quiet Man was done during intensive cloudy weather. Ford said of Hoch's work and attention to detail: "Never employ a cameraman to direct a film, because he never sees what's going on." The two former Navy men also filmed Mister Roberts and The Searchers, his final collaboration with Ford.

In 1959, Hoch began his collaboration with producer-director Irwin Allen, photographing The Big Circus, The Lost World, Five Weeks in a Balloon and both Voyage to the Bottom of the Sea and Voyage to the Bottom of the Sea (TV series) where Hoch was awarded an Emmy Award. He also photographed episodes of Lost in Space and The Time Tunnel.

Hoch's films included the war films Halls of Montezuma and The Green Berets, the westerns The Redhead from Wyoming, The Young Land and Sergeants 3, a return to Ireland and Walt Disney for Darby O'Gill and the Little People and the science fiction classic Robinson Crusoe on Mars filmed in Death Valley. However, Hoch stated that cinematography didn't matter in a comedy, because the subject matter didn't lend itself to dramatic lighting and overview.

Hoch finished his career on the American television series The Banana Splits and Nanny and the Professor.

Hoch was elected president of the American Society of Cinematographers. Hoch died following a stroke on March 20, 1979, in Santa Monica, California.
