= Fernanda Tapia =

Mexican radio announcer, host, and voice actress

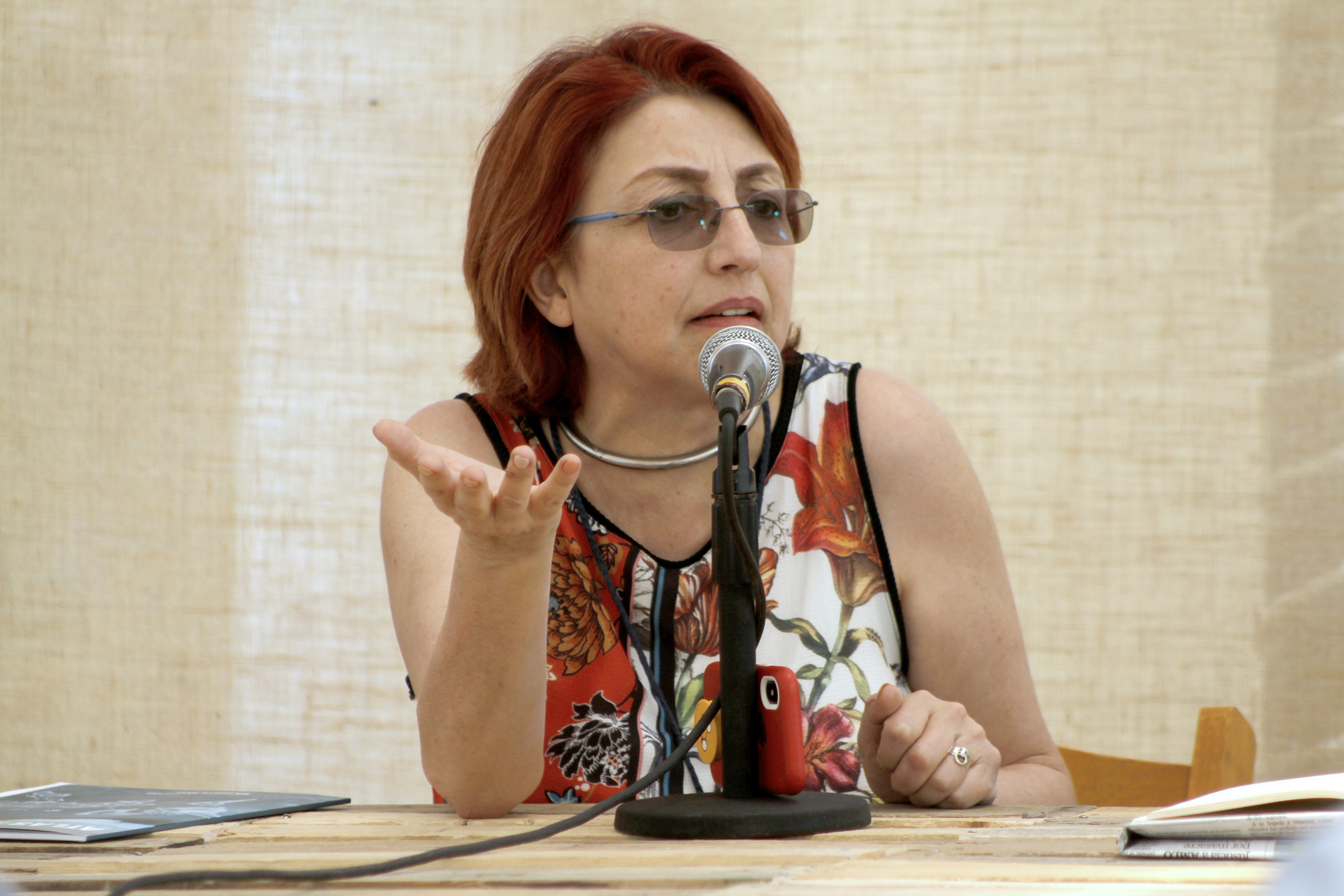
- Born: Maria Fernanda Tapia Canovi; June 23, 1965 (age 61); Ciudad Madero, Tamaulipas, Mexico
- Education: Universidad Tecnológica de México
- Occupations: Announcer; presenter; producer; screenwriter; lecturer; singer; voice actress
- Spouse: Pedro López Michelone
- Children: 1

General director of Radio Educación
- Incumbent
- Assumed office 2 December 2024
- Preceded by: Jesús Alejo Santiago
- Website: www.fernandatapia.mx

Maria Fernanda Tapia Canovi (born June 23, 1965) is a Mexican announcer, presenter, producer, screenwriter, lecturer, singer, and voice actress. Since December 2024, she serves as general director of Radio Educación.

== Career ==
=== Announcer ===
As a radio announcer, host, and voice actress, Fernanda Tapia has contributed to programs and projects such as the Rock 101 shows La Odisea Del Emisario, Hablemos de hombres, Cáigase de la cama, La media naranja, El tianguis de Fernanda, La Talacha, La Pantera, Sabrosita 590, Espacio 59, Radio Alicia, Radioactivo 98.5, La Revista del Consumidor, Entre lo público y lo privado (together with Andrés Roemer), and Las del estribo. She also has a podcast titled El Tao at Prodigy.msn.com, and another at Dixo.com. As of November 5, 2012, she is the director and announcer of the Triple W radio program through W Radio, which is broadcast Monday through Friday from 1:00 p.m. to 3:00 p.m.

=== Presenter ===
Tapia is currently the presenter of the programs Almohadazo on cable television network 52MX, Juntas, ni difuntas with Mariana H. and Laura García on Proyecto 40, Hoy Te Toca with Paulina Mercado, and Diálogos en Confianza on Canal Once.

=== Columnist ===
She has worked in media since the age of 32, on magazines such as Reporte Indigo and El Huevo, as well as newspapers such as El Centro, El Financiero, La Jornada, Publimetro, and UNOMÁSUNO. However, as she has clarified on several occasions, she is not a journalist, since she does not have the training or studies that would qualify her as such.

=== Writer ===
Tapia has published four books, beginning in 2004 with El sexo y otros cuentos de hadas (Sex and Other Fairy Tales). The second, 2008's Sueños (Dreams), is a collection of dreams of politicians, actors, and friends, written with the participation of Dr. Marco Campuzano, and presented by Horacio Franco, Marisol Gasé, Humberto Vélez, Juan Alarcón, Ana Francis Mor, and Gustavo Munguía. In 2011 she launched her third book, Tampoco se trata de ser perfectas (Nor is it a Question of Being Perfect), which includes a series of confessions made by women from different backgrounds. In 2012 she contributed the epilogue to El bestiario político del Almohadazo (The Political Bestiary of El Almohadazo), developed by the writers of El Almohadazo and coordinated by the program's head of information, showing the political fauna of the country.

Books
Year	Title	Publisher	Co-authors	ISBN
2004	El sexo y otros cuentos de hadas	Plaza & Janés		9700517497
2008	Sueños	Norma	Dr. Marco Campuzano	9700917622
2011	Tampoco se trata de ser perfectas	Océano		9786074005851
2012	El bestiario político del Almohadazo	Planeta	Fernando Abrego (Charro), Cesar Arreola, Keren Chaires, and Andres Vargas "Ruzo"	9786070710483

=== Screenwriter ===
She has written several comic scripts and sketches for Eugenio Derbez, Leonorilda Ochoa, Víctor Trujillo, Ausencio Cruz, Héctor Suárez, and David Patiño, among others.

=== Dubbing ===
Fernanda Tapia has dubbed such well-known characters as Mary Alice Young in Desperate Housewives, Janet Darling on Clarissa Explains It All, and Mirage in the animated film The Incredibles.

==== Voice in films ====
Year	Film	Character	Notes
1995	It Takes Two	Diane Barrows	
1996	The First Wives Club	Cynthia	
1999	Gimme the Power	Narrator	
2000	Chicken Run	Mac	animated
2001	Riding in Cars with Boys	Teresa D'Onofrio	
2003	Once Upon a Time in Mexico	Ajedrez	
2003	Finding Nemo	Coral	animated
2003	Freaky Friday	Pei Pei	
2004	The Hitchhiker's Guide to the Galaxy	Deep Thought	
2004	The Incredibles	Mirage	animated
2007	Enchanted	Phoebe Banks	
2008	WALL-E	Mary	animated

==== Voice in series ====
Year	Program	Role	Notes
1991–1994	Clarissa Explains It All	Janet Darling	
2002	Teamo Supremo	Sleeper agent	animated
2002–2007	Kim Possible	Kim's mother	animated
2004–2012	Desperate Housewives	Mary Alice Young	

== Recognition ==
- 1990: Named Locutora de la Decada (Announcer of the Decade) by the newspaper El Financiero
- 1999: National Journalism Prize of Mexico
- 2001: Pagés Llergo Prize for the program Diálogos en Confianza, which she presented
- 2002: First place in the Radio Biennial in the category "Promotional Radio Station Identification"
- 2002: Named Best Female Booth Announcer by Voces magazine
- 2003: Prize for Best Medical Journalism for the Diálogos en Confianza episode "Esquizofrenia" (Schizophrenia)
- 2003: AMPRYT Prize for Best Television Program Content for the whole crew of Diálogos en Confianza
- 2004: Emmanuel Haro Villa Award for Featured Journalists from the Association of Theatrical Journalists
- 2004: Golden Laurel of Mexican-Spanish Quality for the program Diálogos en Confianza
- 2008: Named a Woman of the Year as part of International Women's Day

== Personal life ==
Tapia is an adherent to BDSM and was on Amordidas and interviewed by Silvia Olmedo, where she demonstrated, to the shock of many viewers, how to be whipped.
