= The Young Land =

1959 film by Ted Tetzlaff

- DVD cover
- Directed by: Ted Tetzlaff
- Screenplay by: Norman S. Hall (as Norman Shannon Hall)
- Story by: John Reese, Frontier Frenzy
- Produced by: Patrick Ford
- Starring: Patrick Wayne; Yvonne Craig; Dennis Hopper; Dan O'Herlihy
- Cinematography: Winton C. Hoch; Henry Sharp
- Edited by: Tom McAdoo
- Music by: Dimitri Tiomkin
- Production company: C.V. Whitney Pictures
- Distributed by: Columbia Pictures
- Release date: May 1, 1959
- Running time: 89 minutes
- Country: United States
- Language: English

The Young Land is a 1959 American Western film directed by Ted Tetzlaff and starring Patrick Wayne, Yvonne Craig, Dennis Hopper and Dan O'Herlihy. The cinematography was by Technicolor developer Winton C. Hoch and Henry Sharp. The film was distributed by Columbia Pictures Corporation.

It is the third and final of only three films produced by Cornelius Vanderbilt Whitney's C.V. Whitney Pictures; the first being The Searchers in 1956 with John Wayne and directed by John Ford, the second being The Missouri Traveler in 1958 with Brandon deWilde and Lee Marvin.

Having previously been featured in a number of his father's films, this was the 20-year-old Wayne's attempt at a leading role while he was still enrolled at Loyola Marymount University, graduating from there in 1961.

The film was scored by Dimitri Tiomkin who earned a nomination for Academy Award for Best Original Song for "Strange Are the Ways of Love" (The Young Land theme) with lyrics by Ned Washington and sung by Randy Sparks.

== Plot ==
In 1848, after the end of the Mexican–American War and with the advent of California statehood, an American gunslinger named Hatfield Carnes (Dennis Hopper) kills a Mexican man in California. He is arrested for the murder by Jim Ellison (Patrick Wayne), a former United States marine and now sheriff with neither a gun nor a badge. Appointed by prominent local businessman and politico Don Roberto de la Madrid (Roberto de la Madrid), Ellison has designs on de la Madrid's spoiled daughter, Elena (Yvonne Craig). By-the-book Judge Millard Isham (Dan O'Herlihy) arrives in town with Deputy Marshal Ben Stroud (Cliff Ketchum) to conduct the trial. Wanted tough guy Lee Hearn (Ken Curtis) has problems of his own with the law, but is willing to help Ellison as a deputy. Carnes is placed on trial in the new Mexican Cession territory with the Hispanic populace waiting to learn if American justice will convict Carnes.

== Cast ==
- Patrick Wayne as Sheriff Jim Ellison (credited as Pat Wayne)
- Yvonne Craig as Elena de la Madrid
- Dennis Hopper as Hatfield Carnes
- Dan O'Herlihy as Judge Millard Isham
- Roberto de la Madrid as Don Roberto de la Madrid
- Cliff Ketchum as Deputy Marshal Ben Stroud
- Ken Curtis as Lee Hearn
- Pedro Gonzalez Gonzalez as Deputy Santiago
- Ed Sweeney as Sully / Kelly (credited as Edward Sweeney)
- John Quijada as Vasquero
- Miguel Comacho as Miguel
- Tom Tiner as Charlie Higgins, Court Clerk
- Carlos Romero as Francisco Quiroga
- Eddie Juaregui as Drifter (credited as Edward Juaregui)
- The Mariachis Los Reyes De Chapala as Mariachis

== Home media ==
No less than six different releases of The Young Land were produced on VHS. Similarly, several DVD versions were released over the years, mainly as an inclusion in a multiple film "western pack". The Young Land is available on Region 0 DVD through VCI Entertainment and video on demand in standard non-widescreen format.

== See also ==
- List of American films of 1959
- Public domain film
- List of films in the public domain in the United States
