= Celsa Albert Batista =

Black Dominican historian

- Born: Celsa Altagracia Albert Batista; 28 July 1942; Guaymate, La Romana Province, Dominican Republic
- Occupations: academic, writer

Celsa Albert Batista (born 28 July 1942) is a Black Dominican academic, writer and historian. She wrote one of the major works on slavery and is one of the few scholars who have focused on black identity in the Dominican Republic. Widely recognized for her work, she has received the Pedro Henríquez Ureña Gold Medal from the Government of the Dominican Republic, the International José Martí Prize from the United Nations Educational, Scientific and Cultural Organization (UNESCO), the Order of Merit of Duarte, Sánchez and Mella, among other honors.

== Early life ==
Celsa Altagracia Albert Batista was born on 28 July 1942 in Guaymate, a batey in La Romana Province, Dominican Republic to Rosa Batista and Charles Albert. Her mother was Dominican, from Santiago de los Caballeros and her father, a Cocolo who migrated to the Dominican Republic from Saint Kitts and Nevis. Conditions in the batey were often deplorable and educational opportunities were limited. Though it was difficult, Albert completed her primary and secondary education, while working to help her family meet their basic needs after her father's death.

== Career ==
In 1964 Albert began working as an elementary school teacher in a school she founded located in La Romana in her home province. The Escuela Nuestra Señora de La Altagracia (Our Lady of Grace School) served student in the low-income areas, where she had grown up. She simultaneously pursued university studies, graduating magna cum laude with her bachelor's of education degree in 1977, from Pedro Henríquez Ureña University. In 1979, she left teaching and moved to Mexico City to enroll in the National Autonomous University of Mexico (Spanish: Universidad Nacional Autónoma de México, UNAM) and further her education in the school's Latin American Studies program. Completing her master's degree with honors in 1983, Albert's master's thesis, The Educational Ideologies of José Martí, was inspired by José Martí's writings on racism and their ethnic group. Her own experiences growing up as cocolo and the influence of studying Martí, led her to focus on Afro-Dominican history as a focus for her scholarship.

Albert returned to Santo Domingo and began working as curriculum director of social sciences for the Ministry of Education. Simultaneously, she joined the faculty of history at the Universidad Católica Santo Domingo (UCSD) and continued to work in various posts in the education Ministry, such as serving as director to the Division of General Curriculum and Assessment and later director of culture. In 1987, she was appointed as chair of the history department at UCSD, becoming the dean of the College of Humanities in 1988. Albert became the vice rector of UCSD in 1989. She and other scholars began challenging the official history of the country, which omitted the contributions of the black population of the island, or if they were included, depicted those with African heritage as having lower-status, or subservient roles. Her first book, Los africanos y nuestra isla (Historia, cultura e identidad) (The Africans and our Island (History, Culture and Identity), was published in 1987. Two years later, she published Pulula: La poesía como reflejo de la historia (Pulula: Poetry as a reflection of history) and followed it in 1990 with a landmark book, Mujer e esclavitud en Santo Domingo (Women and Slavery in Santo Domingo). Her treatment on enslaved women remains one of the "major works" written on bondage in the Dominican Republic. She coined the phrase cimarronaje doméstico (domestic wild animal), to refer to servant women who assisted fleeing slaves and challenged the notion that there was no history of active resistance from slaves in the country. The English word maroon, which refers to escaped slaves living independently in enclaves, derives from the Spanish word cimarrón.

Albert founded the Instituto Dominicano de Estudios Africanos y Asiáticos "Sebastián Lemba" (Indeasel) (Sebastián Lemba Dominican Institute for African and Asian Studies) in 1990. Serving as president and executive director of the organization, she simultaneously continued her work in the education Ministry and at UCSD. In 1992, Albert published two works, Las ideas educativas de José Martí (The educational ideas of José Martí) and a short story La esclava Elena (The Slave Elena). Her publication on Martí led her to be awarded the International José Martí Prize by UNESCO in 1995, which was first established that year to commemorate the centennial of Martí's death. That same year, she was honored by the Ministry of Education with the Pedro Henríquez Ureña Gold Medal. In 1996, on International Women's Day, Albert was honored with the Order of Merit of Duarte, Sánchez and Mella.

Albert returned to Mexico to attain her PhD in Latin American Studies from UNAM in 1997. She returned to the Dominican Republic and retiring from her government post, continued teaching history at UCSD. She simultaneously served as graduate coordinator for Caribbean history and geography and in the Division of Continuing education was appointed as the director of education and popular culture projects. Her short story La esclava Elena was adapted as a play, Juan Pablo Duarte y las mujeres en la independencia nacional (Juan Pablo Duarte and women in national independence) in 2012. Albert has lectured widely internationally on the African diaspora in Latin America. She continues to publish on the subject, with essays and texts like República Dominicana: Primer País afrodescendiente de América (Dominican Republic: First Afro-descendant Country in America, 2014) and Diversidad e identidad en República Dominicana (Diversity and identity in the Dominican Republic, 2014). In 2013, a street at the Plaza de la Cultura in Santo Domingo was renamed in her honor.
