= Braulio Maldonado Sández =

Mexican politician

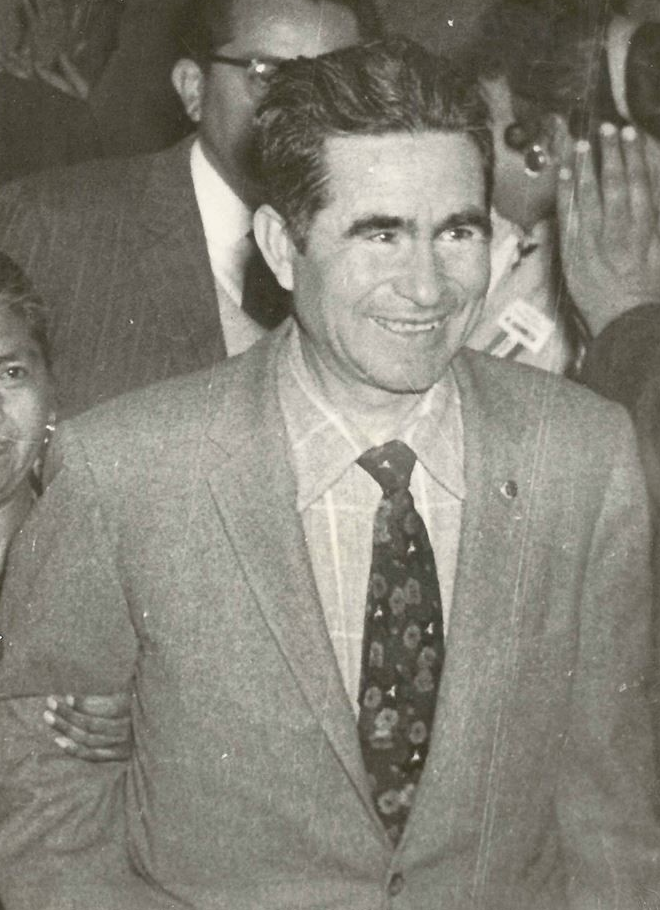
- Governor Sandez circa 1955

2nd Governor of Baja California
- In office 1 December 1953 – 13 November 1959
- Preceded by: Alfonso García González
- Succeeded by: Eligio Esquivel Méndez

Personal details
- Born: 1903 San José del Cabo, Baja California Territory, Mexico
- Died: 1990 (aged 86–87)
- Party: PRI
- Education: National Autonomous University of Mexico
- Profession: Politician, Political Activist, Writer, Lawyer

Braulio Maldonado Sández (1903 – 1990) was a Mexican politician who served as the first Governor of Baja California from 1953 until 1959. He was one of the most colorful leaders in the history of 20th-century Mexican politics.

== Early life ==
Sández was born in San José del Cabo, Baja California Territory, Mexico in 1903 to Cruz Maldonado Zumaya and Luisa Sández Ojeda.

After Baja California earned statehood, Maldonado was chosen as the gubernatorial candidate for the Institutional Revolutionary Party (PRI). He won the ensuing election in October 1953 to become the inaugural Governor of Baja California. Maldonado officially began his term as Governor on 1 December, taking part in a ceremony in Mexicali which was attended by President Adolfo Ruiz Cortines.

Political offices
Preceded by Alfonso García González	Governor of Baja California; 1953 – 1959	Next: Eligio Esquivel Méndez
