= Antonio Martínez Luna =

Mexican politician

Antonio Martínez Luna was the Attorney General of the Mexican state of Baja California in the administration of governor Eugenio Elorduy Walther of the National Action Party.

== See also ==
- Antonio Carmona Añorve — Attorney General for Mexicali during the government of Governor Elorduy convicted for similar crimes
