= John Fernandez =

John Fernandez or John Fernandes may refer to:

- João Fernandes (explorer) (15th century), Portuguese explorer
- John Fernandez (Indiana politician) (born 1953), mayor of Bloomington, Indiana from 1995 to 2003
- John Fernandez (Malaysian politician) (1941–2023)
- John Fernandes (musician) (born 1975), American multi-instrumentalist musician
- John V. Fernandes (born 1952), Massachusetts politician
- John Fernandes (Indian politician) (active 1987–2014), Indian politician from Goa

== See also ==
- Juan Fernández (disambiguation)
