= Milton Castellanos Everardo =

Mexican politician

6th Governor of Baja California
- In office November 1, 1971 – October 31, 1977
- Preceded by: Raúl Sánchez Díaz Martell
- Succeeded by: Roberto de la Madrid

President of the Chamber of Deputies of Mexico
- In office October 1, 1951 – October 31, 1951
- Preceded by: Teófilo Borunda
- Succeeded by: Rafael Corrales Ayala

Personal details
- Born: March 23, 1920 Copainalá, Chiapas
- Died: October 10, 2011 (aged 91) Mexicali, Baja California
- Party: PRI
- Spouse: Lucía Gout
- Children: Five - Lourdes, Lucía, Milton Emilio, Jesús and Gerardo

Milton Castellanos Everardo (March 23, 1920 – October 10, 2011) was a Mexican politician and lawyer. He served as the Governor of Baja California from 1971 to 1977. He also served as the President of the Chamber of Deputies Directive Board for a brief period in 1951.

== Biography ==
=== Early life ===
Castellanos was born in Copainalá, Chiapas, on March 23, 1920. He earned a law degree from National Autonomous University of Mexico and became a lawyer. He married Lucía Gout, with whom he had five children - Lourdes, Lucía, Milton Emilio, Jesús and Gerardo. His son, Milton Emilio Castellanos Gout, served as the mayor of Mexicali from 1989 to 1992.

=== Political career ===
He served as a local deputy in the Congress of Chiapas before moving to the northern city of Mexicali, Baja California, during the 1950s, where he worked as a lawyer. Additionally, Castellanos worked as the head of the legal department for the Mexican Navy.

Castellanos served as the Chief Justice of the Supreme Court of Baja California from 1959 to 1965. The present-day court complex was constructed in Tijuana during his tenure. He founded the legal publication, Boletín Judicia (Judicial Bulletin).

=== Governor of Baja California ===
A member of the Institutional Revolutionary Party (PRI), Castellanos held office as Baja California's 6th Governor from 1971 to 1977. He earned a reputation as an inclusive and impartial state executive. Castellanos spearheaded the construction of concrete barriers along the Tijuana River, which ended habitual flooding. Castellanos also cleared the Cartolandias, which were communities of cardboard shacks which lined the Tijuana River at the time, which had hindered development in the area. He oversaw the construction of new facilities for the executive, legislative and judicial branches of state government in Mexicali. Four highway bypasses were also built, two in Mexicali and two in Tijuana. Castellanos reorganized the Dirección de Difusión Cultural, which moved to the state's former Government House. New development plans were also devised for each of Baja California's major cities. Former Tijuana Mayor Fernando Márquez Arce credited Castellanos with bringing impartiality to Baja California's political and legal systems.

Milton Castellanos Everardo died of natural causes at his home in the Jardines del Valle housing development in Mexicali on October 10, 2011, at the age of 91. He was survived by his wife, five children, twenty-seven grandchildren and twenty-eight great-grandchildren. Castellanos was cremated according to his wishes. His funeral, which was held at the Catedral de Nuestra Señora de Guadalupe, was presided over by Bishop José Isidro Guerrero Macías of the Roman Catholic Diocese of Mexicali.

| Preceded by Raúl Sánchez Díaz Martell | Governor of Baja California; 1971–1977 | Succeeded by Roberto de la Madrid |
