= 1969 Ethiopian embassy shooting =

Mass shooting in Mexico City

1969 Ethiopian Embassy shooting
- Location: Ethiopian Embassy, Mexico City, Mexico
- Date: 18 March 1969
- Target: Ethiopian diplomatic mission
- Attack type: Shooting
- Weapon: Firearms
- Deaths: 4
- Injuries: 6
- Perpetrator: Bermanu Afework
- Motive: Unknown

On March 18, 1969, a mass shooting occurred at the Ethiopian embassy in Mexico City, Mexico. Three people were killed and six others were injured, while the perpetrator later committed suicide.

== Background ==
Ethiopia and Mexico established diplomatic relations in 1949 and opened embassies in each other's capital in 1963. Since 1990, however, Ethiopia has not had a resident ambassador in Mexico, and Mexico's embassy in Addis Ababa was closed between 1989 and 2007.

The Ethiopian embassy was located in the Polanco district of Mexico City.

== Shooting ==
The shooting occurred during the night of March 18, 1969. According to contemporary reports, Bermanu Afework, a 30-year-old janitor from Ethiopia who worked at the embassy, opened fire inside the embassy. Three people were killed in the shooting, including Belaynesh Bekele, the wife of Ethiopian ambassador Gaitachew Bekele, and two domestic servants. Six people injured, including three children, and two of those children were ambassador Bekele's.

Foreign secretary Antonio Carrillo Flores attended the scene and, since the ambassador could not be located, authorized the local police to enter the embassy under the emergency provisions of the Vienna Convention on Diplomatic Relations.

After the shooting, Afework ran to a hotel in the colonia Morelos and rented a room. The hotel owner contacted the police after becoming suspicious of him. Afework was later found dead after he hung himself.

== Perpetrator ==
Mexican police identified Bermanu Afework, a 30-year-old janitor who worked at the Embassy, but he had been released after harassing the servant girls at the embassy.

== Aftermath ==
Ambassador Gaitachew Bekele returned to the embassy at around 01:30 the following day and was accompanied to the hospital by Secretary Carrillo Flores.

Gaitachew Bekele later translated a poem titled "She is the Only Beauty" by Afework Yohannes, in memory of Belaynesh.
