= Oscar Baylón Chacón =

Mexican politician (1929–2020)

9th Governor of Baja California
- In office January 6, 1989 – October 31, 1989
- Preceded by: Xicotencatl Leyva Mortera
- Succeeded by: Ernesto Ruffo Appel

Personal details
- Born: 1929; Chihuahua, Chihuahua
- Died: August 10, 2020 (aged 91); Tijuana, Baja California
- Political party: Institutional Revolutionary Party (PRI)
- Profession: Agronomist

Oscar Baylón Chacón (1929 – August 10, 2020) was a Mexican politician, member of the Institutional Revolutionary Party and served as Senator of the Republic and Governor of Baja California.

Oscar Baylón Chacón was an agronomist graduate of the Escuela Superior de Agricultura "Hermanos Escobar" in Ciudad Juárez, and at his own expense was transferred to Baja California, where he initiated a political career that carried him to be Director of Works of the Territory, Municipal President of Tecate from 1959 to 1962, Director of Land Registry, Deputy Congressperson of Baja California from 1965 to 1968, and Chief Clerk of the Government.

In 1976, he was chosen as Senator of the Republic until 1982 and on January 6, 1989 was appointed Governor of Baja California to replace Xicoténcatl Leyva Mortera. During the 9 months of his administration, he concluded mainly hydraulics works to improve the supply of water of the main cities of the state.

== See also ==
- Baja California
- Governor of Baja California

Preceded by Xicoténcatl Leyva Mortera	Governor of Baja California interim 1989–1989	Succeeded by Ernesto Ruffo Appel
