= Ernesto Ruffo Appel =

American and Mexican politician

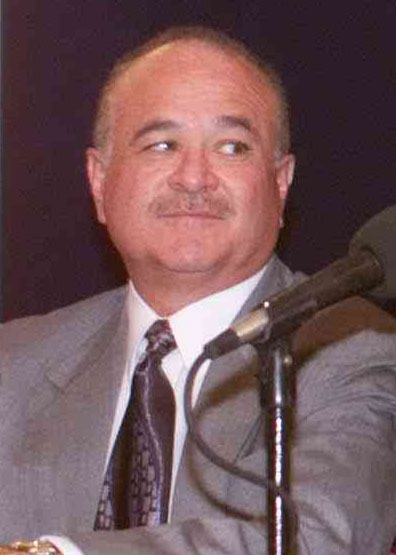

10th Governor of Baja California
- In office 1 November 1989 – 31 October 1995
- Preceded by: Oscar Baylón Chacón
- Succeeded by: Hector Terán Terán

Senator of the Congress of the Union for Baja California
- In office 1 September 2012 – 31 August 2018
- Preceded by: Alejandro González Alcocer
- Succeeded by: Jaime Bonilla Valdez

Personal details
- Born: 25 June 1952 (age 74) San Diego, California, U.S.
- Citizenship: United States; Mexico
- Party: We Are Mexico (since 2026)
- Other political affiliations: National Action Party (PAN) (since 1985)
- Profession: Businessperson

Ernesto Guillermo Ruffo Appel (Note: In this Mexican name, the surname is Ruffo and the second or maternal family name is Appel.) (born 25 June 1952) is an American and Mexican politician who served as the 10th governor of Baja California from 1989 to 1995. As a member of the National Action Party (PAN), Ruffo was the first state governor not affiliated with the ruling Institutional Revolutionary Party (PRI) and its forerunners since 1929. He has served as a member of the Advisory Council of the We Are Mexico party since February 2026.

== Life and career ==
Born to Mexican parents in San Diego, California, U.S., on 25 June 1952, Ruffo attended elementary school in the coastal town of Ensenada in the state of Baja California. He attended the Monterrey Institute of Technology and Higher Education (ITESM), where he graduated with a bachelor's degree in business. He became a member of the PAN in 1985 and was elected municipal president of the municipality of Ensenada in 1986. In 1989 he was elected governor of the state of Baja California in a major upset in which he defeated the PRI's Margarita Ortega Villa with 52.3% of the votes cast.

In 2000, he supported the presidential candidacy of Vicente Fox and, during Fox's administration, was the Coordinator of Migration Affairs for the Northern Border from 2000 to 2003. He was an alternate senator in the 60th and 61st Congresses (2006 to 2012), and he later served as a senator for Baja California in the 62nd and 63rd Congresses (2012 to 2018). In the 2018 general election, he was elected to a plurinominal seat in the Chamber of Deputies for the duration of the 64th Congress.

Ruffo resigned from the PAN's National Executive Committee on 26 October 2018 over the direction the party was taking.

In February 2026, he joined the Advisory Council of We Are Mexico, which later secured its registration as a national political party in June 2026; he did not, however, resign his membership in the PAN.

On 16 July 2026, he was arrested in Ensenada on charges related to organized crime and fuel smuggling. The We Are Mexico party demanded his immediate release, accusing the federal government of orchestrating a "smokescreen" to detract public attention from scandals implicating current governor of Baja California Marina del Pilar Ávila.

== See also ==
- es:Elecciones estatales de Baja California de 1989

== Notes ==
Preceded by Oscar Baylón Chacón	Governor of Baja California; 1989–1995	Succeeded by Héctor Terán Terán
Preceded by David Ojeda	Municipal president of Ensenada; 1986–1989	Succeeded by Enrique Chapela (interim)
