= International José Martí Prize =

The International José Martí Prize serves to "promote and reward an activity of outstanding merit in accordance with the ideals and spirit" of Cuban independence leader, thinker, and poet José Martí".

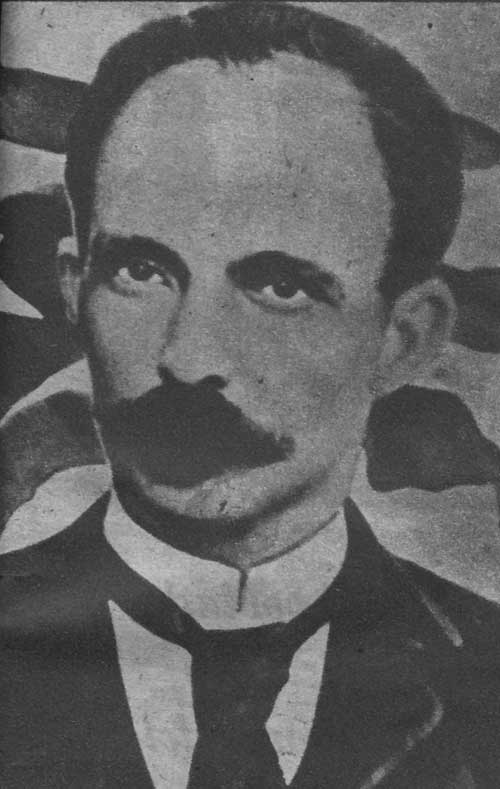
José Martí

The Prize is awarded by the United Nations Educational, Scientific and Cultural Organization (UNESCO) roughly every four years. It was first given in 1995, the centenary of Martí's death. In addition to the intrinsic distinction bestowed on recipients, the award comes with a sum of money (currently US$5,000), and donated by the government of Cuba.

Prize winners are selected by the unanimous decision a jury of seven – five "eminent persons" appointed by the director-general of UNESCO, another eminent figure chosen by the Cuban authorities, and a representative of the director-general – from a list of candidates submitted by UNESCO member states and accredited non-governmental organizations. Individuals, groups of people, and institutions are all eligible as candidates.

== Laureates ==
Year	Awardee	Country
2023	Paul Estrade	France
2019	Roberto Fernández Retamar	Cuba
2016	Alfonso Herrera Franyutti	Mexico
2013	Frei Betto	Brazil
2009	Atilio Borón	Argentina
2005	Hugo Chávez	Venezuela
2003	Pablo González Casanova	Mexico
1999	Oswaldo Guayasamín	Ecuador
1999	Milagros Palma Guzmán	Nicaragua
1999	Georges Anglade	Haiti
1995	Celsa Albert Batista	Dominican Republic

== See also ==
- Order of José Marti

== Link ==
- Official site
