= Alfonso García González =

Former governor of the state of Baja California, Mexico

11th Governor of North Territory of Baja California
- In office 22 October 1947 – 26 November 1952
- Preceded by: Alberto V. Aldrete

1st Governor of the State of Baja California
- In office 26 November 1952 – 30 November 1953
- Succeeded by: Braulio Maldonado Sández

Personal details
- Born: March 19, 1909 Toluca, State of Mexico
- Died: December 2, 1961 (aged 52)
- Education: National Autonomous University of Mexico

Alfonso García González (19 March 1909 – 2 December 1961) was a Mexican politician. He was the last governor of the North Territory of Baja California and the first provisional governor of the State of Baja California.

== Early life ==
Alfonso García González was born in Toluca, State of Mexico on 19 March 1909. He represented Mexico at the 1928 Oympic Games in Amsterdam as part of the track and field team. He attended the National Autonomous University of Mexico, earning his law degree in 1931.

== Governor of Baja California ==
García González was appointed governor of the North Territory of Baja California by president Miguel Alemán Valdés, taking office on 22 October 1947. The territory became a state on 16 January 1952 and García González served as provisional governor until 30 November 1953, when he was succeeded by Braulio Maldonado Sández.

== Later political career ==
He later served as ambassador of Mexico to Colombia. In 1958, he became president of the Confederación Deportiva Mexicana and from 1959 to 1961 he headed the Mexican department of tourism.

== See also ==
- Governor of Baja California
