= Pablo González Casanova =

Mexican lawyer, sociologist and historian (1922–2023)

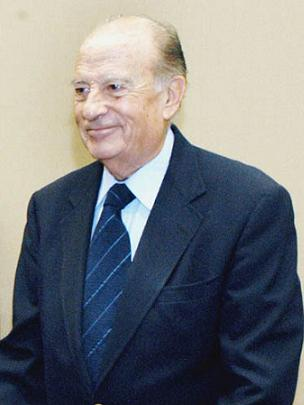
- González Casanova in 2007

Rector of the National Autonomous University of Mexico
- In office May 1970 – 1972
- Preceded by: Javier Barros Sierra
- Succeeded by: Guillermo Soberón Acevedo

Personal details
- Born: Pablo González Casanova y del Valle; 11 February 1922; Toluca, State of Mexico, Mexico
- Died: 18 April 2023 (aged 101); Tlalpan, Mexico City, Mexico
- Parent: Pablo González Casanova
- Occupation: Sociologist, lawyer, historian

Pablo González Casanova y del Valle (Note: In this Spanish name, the first or paternal surname is González Casanova and the second or maternal family name is del Valle.) (11 February 1922 – 18 April 2023) was a Mexican lawyer, sociologist, and historian. He was awarded UNESCO's International José Martí Prize in 2003.

González Casanova was born in Toluca, State of Mexico, in 1922. He took a degree in law at the National Autonomous University of Mexico (UNAM) and earned a master's degree in historical science at El Colegio de México. At the age of 28 he was awarded a doctorate in sociology by the Sorbonne.

He served as rector of the UNAM from 1970 to 1972 and, in 2011, he was elected an honorary member of the Mexican Academy of Language. In addition to the International José Martí Prize, he received the National Prize for Arts and Sciences in 1984.

He died in Tlalpan, Mexico City, in 2023, at the age of 101.

== Publications ==
- Misoneísmo y modernidad en el siglo XVIII en México (1948)
- Una Utopía de América (Ed. El colegio de México)(1953)
- Estudio de la Técnica Social (1958)
- La literatura perseguida en la crisis de la Colonia (1958)
- La democracia en México (1965)
- Las categorías del desarrollo económico y la investigación en Ciencias Sociales (1977)
- Sociología de la explotación (1980)
- La nueva metafísica y el socialismo (1982)
- El estado de los partidos políticos en México (1983)
- Imperialismo y liberación en América Latina (1983)
- La hegemonía del pueblo y la lucha centro-americana (1984)
- Las Nuevas Ciencias y las Humanidades: De la Academia a la Política (Ed. Anthropos)(2004)
