= Rufo (surname) =

Rufo is a surname. Notable people with the surname include:

- Alice Rufo (born 1980), French politician
- Antonio Gómez Rufo (born 1954), Spanish writer
- Christopher Rufo (born 1984), American documentary filmmaker, journalist and conservative activist
- Robert Rufo, American jurist and politician

== See also ==
- Rufo (given name)
- Ruffo, surname
