= Antonio Carmona Añorve =

Mexican politician

Antonio Hermenegildo Carmona Añorve was the director of police of Mexicali during the government of Eugenio Elorduy Walther, current governor of Baja California. Due to his collaboration with drug-dealing and organized crime, Carmona was arrested on August 29, 2001. In 2004, he was sentenced to 36 years in prison.

== See also ==
- Antonio Martínez Luna — current Baja California Attorney General under the administration of Governor Walther accused of similar crimes
