= Alejandro González Alcocer =

Mexican politician and lawyer

12th Governor of Baja California
- In office October 7, 1998 – October 31, 2001
- Preceded by: Héctor Terán Terán
- Succeeded by: Eugenio Elorduy Walther

Personal details
- Born: April 24, 1951 (age 73); Mexico City, Distrito Federal
- Political party: National Action Party (PAN)
- Profession: Lawyer

Alejandro González Alcocer (born April 24, 1951) is a Mexican politician and lawyer, belonging to the National Action Party (PAN).

After Alcocer studied law at Universidad Nacional Autónoma de México (UNAM), he began his career in companies in the private sector, and later entered politics, where he served as Secretario del Ayuntamiento of Tijuana, and later as a federal deputy (diputado federal) in the 56th Federal Legislature. González Alcocer is the son of Manuel González Hinojosa, national head of the PAN in the 1960s and 70s.

On October 7, 1998, he was named Substitute Governor of Baja California upon the death of governor Héctor Terán Terán.

He was elected to the Senate, representing Baja California, for the period between 2006–2012.

== See also ==
- Governor of Baja California
- Baja California

Preceded by Héctor Terán Terán	Governor of Baja California; 1998–2001	Succeeded by Eugenio Elorduy Walther
