= Juan Fernández de Rojas =

Spanish historian, writer and humorist

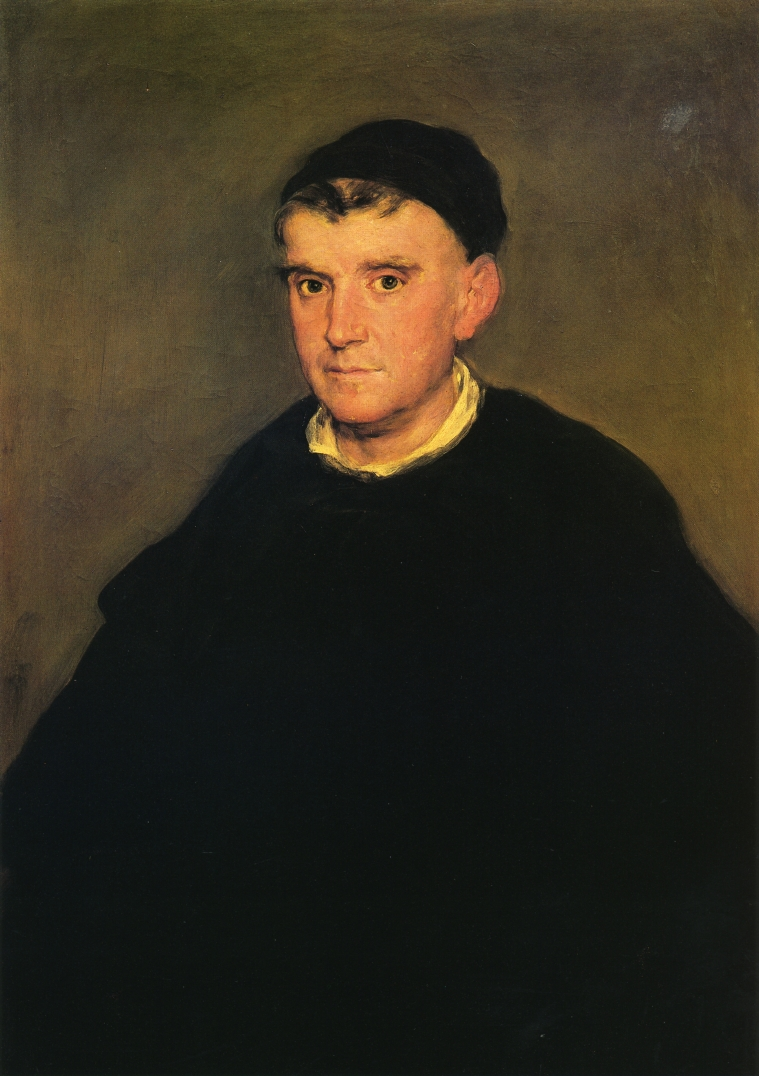
Juan Fernández de Rojas (1750–1819)

Juan Fernández de Rojas (1750–1819) was a Spanish historian, writer and humorist.

== Published works ==
- "Dolores Sermon of Father Juan Fernández de Rojas," The City of God, LXXII, 1907, pp. 465–482. [With a foreword signed by the management of journal].
- With the pseudonym Francisco Florencio Agustin: Science Crotalogía or castanets. Valencia, printing of the Journal [Valencia], 1792. 5th ed., 111 p. Edic. facsimile, Valencia 1985, Paris Bookseller Valencia.
- With the pseudonym Johnny Lopez Polinario: Challenge to literary or scholarly Crotalogía lascastañuelas science. Valencia 1792. 64 p. Edic. facsimile, Valencia 1993, Paris Bookseller Valencia.
- With pesudónimo Alejandro Moya: The triumph of castanets or my trip to Crotalópolis. Madrid 1792, González printing. [Access to the text by Miguel de Cervantes Virtual Library].
- With the pseudonym Francisco Florencio Agustin: Madama Crotalistris Letter on the Second Part of the Crotalogía. Madrid 1792, Cano Benito printing.
- With the pseudonym Cornelius Suarez de Molina: The bird in the league: congratulatory epistle to the translator in the league of modern theology and philosophy. Madrid 1798, office of Don Benito, p. 64.
- Fashion book or essay currutacos history, and Madamitas Pirracas of nuevocuño currutaco written by a philosopher. Madrid 1796, Don Blas Roman printing.
- The pseudonym Antonia Viqueydi: Illustration, addition or commentary Crotalogía and not ladebida property called science of the castanets. Madrid 1792
- The triumph of the castanets or My trip to Crotalópolis (1792), under the pseudonym Alexander Moya.
- Currutaseos, science or ceremonial currutaca currutacos (1799).
