= Juan Fernández Sánchez Navarro =

Mexican politician (born 1977)

Juan Alejandro Fernández Sánchez Navarro (born 3 January 1977) is a Mexican politician affiliated with the National Action Party. He serves as Senator of the LXII Legislature of the Mexican Congress for Baja California Sur.
