= Xicoténcatl Leyva Mortera =

Mexican politician and governor of Baja California (1940–2021)

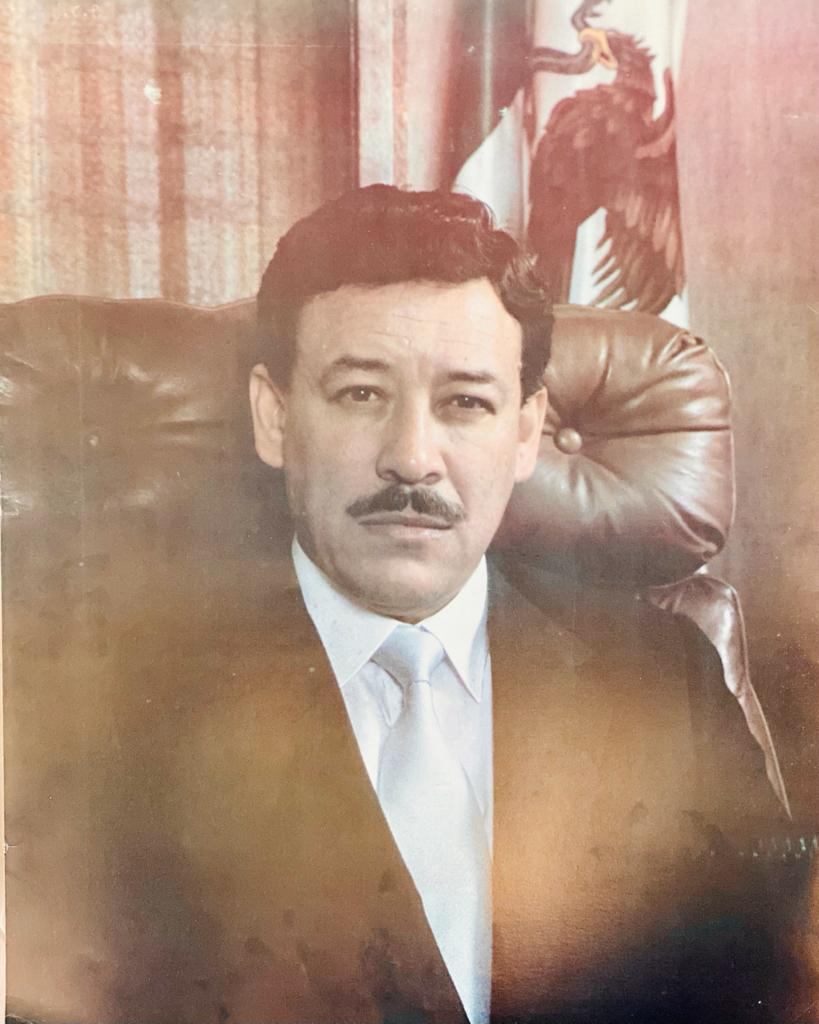

8th Governor of Baja California
- In office November 1, 1983 – January 5, 1989
- Preceded by: Roberto de la Madrid
- Succeeded by: Oscar Baylón Chacón

Personal details
- Born: April 4, 1940 Jalapa, Veracruz
- Died: September 30, 2021 (aged 81)
- Party: Institutional Revolutionary Party (PRI)
- Profession: Attorney

Xicoténcatl Leyva Mortera (April 4, 1940 – September 30, 2021) was a Mexican politician, member of the Institutional Revolutionary Party, who was the Governor of Baja California from 1983 to 1989.

Xicoténcatl Leyva was related to Miguel Alemán Valdés who was the President of Mexico from 1946 to 1952. He held the positions of Assistant Secretary of Secretariat of Finance and Public Credit under Antonio Ortiz Mena, then Administrative Assistant Director of the National Institute of Youth from 1971. Then he became a delegate from the same organization to Tijuana, where he lived thereafter; there he became Undersecretary of Baja California's State Committee of the PRI and in 1978 was elected Mayor of Tijuana. In 1983 he was nominated and elected Governor of Baja California. His government was controversial because he was accused of promoting accelerated growth without order, that made areas that were border towns into big cities without planning. In the 1988 election he was unable to avoid having to recognize the landslide victory of Cuauhtémoc Cárdenas Solórzano in the state as a candidate for the presidency against Carlos Salinas de Gortari, the PRI candidate. This may have cost him politically and make him take a leave as governor on January 5, 1989, and thereafter remain retired from politics.

Preceded by Roberto de la Madrid	Governor of Baja California; 1983–1989	Succeeded by Oscar Baylón Chacón
