= Ruffo =

Ruffo is a surname. Notable people with the surname include:

== Noble house of Ruffo di Calabria ==
- Fabrizio Ruffo (1744–1827), Italian cardinal
- Fulco Ruffo di Calabria (1884–1946), Italian World War I flying ace
- Giordano Ruffo (1200-1256), Italian nobleman and early writer on equestrian medicine
- Paola Ruffo di Calabria (born 1937), queen consort of Belgium
- Tommaso Ruffo (1663–1753), Italian cardinal
- Polissena Ruffo (1400–1420), princess of Calabria

== Others ==
- Albert J. Ruffo (1908–2003), American politician
- Andrée Ruffo, Canadian judge
- Antonio Ruffo (1610s–1678), Sicilian politician, nobleman, patron, and collector
- Armand Garnet Ruffo (born 1955), Canadian scholar, filmmaker, writer and poet
- Bruno Ruffo (1920–2007), Italian motorcycle road racer
- Dennis Ruffo, Canadian music promoter
- Ernesto Ruffo Appel (born 1952), American-born governor of Baja California
- John Ruffo (born 1954), American business executive
- Johnny Ruffo (1988–2023), Australian singer, songwriter, dancer, actor and television presenter
- Leonora Ruffo (1935–2007), Italian film actress
- Marco Ruffo, Italian architect
- Pietro Ruffo (born 1978), Italian artist
- Titta Ruffo (1877–1953), Italian baritone
- Victoria Ruffo (born 1962), Mexican actress
- Vincenzo Ruffo (c. 1508–1587), Italian composer of the Renaissance

== See also ==
- Rufo (surname)
