= Roberto de la Madrid =

Mexican politician

7th Governor of Baja California
- In office November 1, 1977 – October 31, 1983
- Preceded by: Milton Castellanos Everardo
- Succeeded by: Xicoténcatl Leyva Mortera

Personal details
- Born: February 3, 1922 Calexico, California, USA
- Died: March 19, 2010 (aged 88) Tijuana, Baja California, Mexico
- Party: Institutional Revolutionary Party (PRI)
- Spouses: Elena Victoria (m. 1942; died 1988) Regina Johnson (m. 1998)
- Profession: Businessperson

Roberto de la Madrid Romandia (February 3, 1922 – March 19, 2010) was a Mexican elected official who served as governor of Baja California from 1977 to 1983. He was the first American-born governor of a Mexican state. He was a member of the Institutional Revolutionary Party (PRI).

== Early life and education ==
De la Madrid was born February 3, 1922, in Calexico, California, to Mexican parents. He grew up on both sides of the border, attending schools in Tijuana and San Diego, including Sweetwater High School in National City. His American birth made him an American citizen, but he later became certified as a Mexican citizen. He was bilingual and bicultural, and maintained friendships and business activities on both sides of the border.

== Non-political career ==
He was a distributor for Richfield and Pemex and was active in Mexican political campaigns. He also appeared in the 1959 Dennis Hopper film The Young Land and was listed fifth in the credits; the name of his character was Don Roberto de la Madrid.

== Political career ==
In 1973, he was appointed tourism director for the state of Baja California. He later served as one of Baja California's two senators and as director of the national lottery program, appointed by his close friend, President José López Portillo. In 1977, López Portillo chose him to be the PRI candidate for governor of Baja California after the death of the original candidate. His inauguration in 1977 attracted celebrities from both sides of the border including López Portillo, then-San Diego Mayor (later California governor) Pete Wilson, and de la Madrid's longtime friend John Wayne.

News reports at the time spoke of his ambition to be president. He said that he was eligible to be president of either the United States or Mexico, but chose to enter Mexican politics because he figured the odds of becoming president were better in Mexico. By a coincidence of history, unrelated Miguel de la Madrid became president of Mexico in 1982.

As governor Roberto de la Madrid was credited with "helping foster binational relations, attracting foreign investors and establishing a strong tourism program."

== Personal life ==
He was married twice, first to Elena Victoria in 1942, with whom he had two children, until her death in 1988, and secondly to the former Regina Johnson in 1998, who survived him. He died March 19, 2010, in Tijuana, at the age of 88.

Preceded by Milton Castellanos Everardo	Governor of Baja California; 1977–1983	Succeeded by Xicoténcatl Leyva Mortera
