= Rufo (given name) =

Rufo is a given name. Notable people with the given name include:

- Rufo López-Fresquet (1911–1983), Cuban economist
- Rufo Sánchez (born 1986), Spanish footballer
- Rufo Emiliano Verga (born 1969), Italian footballer

== See also ==
- Rufo (surname)
