= Eve Gil =

Mexican writer and journalist

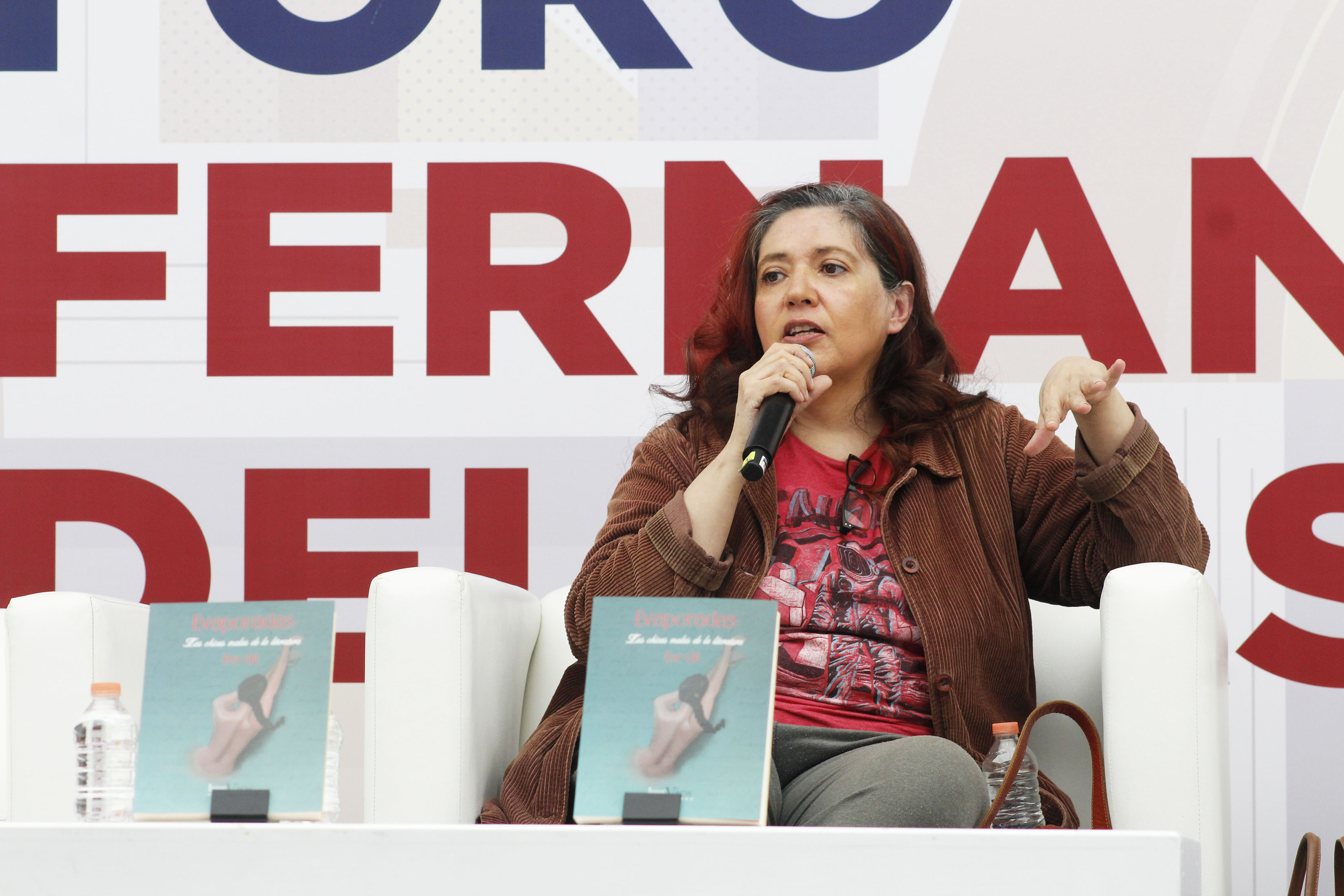
Eve Gil in 2019.

Eve Gil (born 1968) is a Mexican writer and journalist from Hermosillo, Sonora. She is one of the major "NAFTA generation" authors. Her work has won a number of awards such as Premio La Gran Novela Sonorense in 1993, the Premio Nacional de Periodismo Fernando Benítez in 1994, the Concurso de Libro Sonorense in 1994, 1996 and 2006, and the Premio Nacional de Cuento Efraín Huerta in 2006.

== Novels ==
- Hombres necios, Instituto Sonorense de Cultura, 1996.
- El suplicio de Adán, Instituto Sonorense de Cultura, 1998.
- Réquiem por una muñeca rota (Cuento para asustar al lobo), Fondo Editorial Tierra Adentro, 2000.
- Cenotafio de Beatriz, RD Editores, Seville, Spain, 2005.
- Sho-shan y la Dama Oscura, Santillana Ediciones Generales, 2009.
- Tinta Violeta Santillana Ediciones Generales, 2011
- Réquiem para una muñeca rota, Santillana Ediciones Generales, 2013
- Doncella Roja Santillana Ediciones Generales, 2013

== Short fiction ==
- Sueños de Lot, Editorial Porrúa, 2007
- La reina baila hasta morir, Ediciones Fósforo, 2009.
- El perrito de Lady Chatterlay (Collection of the short stories published previously in "Sueños de Lot" and "La reina baila hasta morir"), 2010.

== Poetry ==
- Raíz y canto, Instituto Sonorense de Cultura, 1995.

== Selected anthologies ==
- Jóvenes Creadores del FONCA 1995-96, Conaculta, 1996
- Novísimos cuentos de la república mexicana, Ed. Mayra Inzunza, Fondo Editorial Tierra Adentro, 2004.
- Con un vuelco en el corazón, Editorial Garabatos, 2006

== Requiem for a Broken Doll ==
Requiem for a Broken Doll tells the story of Moramay, a thirteen-year-old girl growing up in the early 80's in Mexico City. An English translation is underway. Excerpts from the novel have appeared in BorderSenses, Fairy Tale Review, and Words without Borders.
