= Luis Alegre Salazar =

Mexican politician (1964–2022)

Deputy of the Congress of the Union from Quintana Roo
- In office 29 August 2018 – 31 August 2021

Personal details
- Born: 4 February 1964
- Died: 5 November 2022 (aged 58) Cancún, Quintana Roo, Mexico
- Party: Morena
- Children: 2
- Education: University of Toronto
- Occupation: Politician

Luis Javier Alegre Salazar (4 February 1964 – 5 November 2022) was a Mexican businessman and politician. He served in the Chamber of Deputies from 2018 to 2021 as a member of Morena and representing the state of Quintana Roo. He also worked in the family radio business, which included XHNUC-FM "Radio Turquesa" and other stations.

== Early life and business career ==
Alegre Salazar was born on 4 February 1964 as the second of four children of Gastón Alegre López, hotelier, broadcaster and one-time gubernatorial candidate. Luis obtained a degree in electrical engineering from the University of Toronto in Canada. In addition to working for Radio Turquesa, his father's radio business, he also worked at Canada's Imperial Oil and for Houston International Teleport from 1986-1992, then he created Omnipage, a nationwide paging network in Mexico. He worked in the public sector at Telecomm de México and the SCT from 1993 to 1997. Later, he worked for Teledesic for 4 years, ICO Global Communications for 14 years, AllianceBernstein for 6 years, and Deutsche Bank for 10 years.

== Political career ==
In 2018, Alegre Salazar was elected to the Chamber of Deputies as a proportional representation deputy from the third electoral region. He presided over the Tourism Commission and also served on the Communications and Transportation and Radio and Television Commissions. While a deputy, he also led the translation of the Quintana Roo state constitution into the Maya language, which was finished in 2020. After his term ended, a proposal he led to reform Mexican migratory laws to allow the use of biometric passports for entry and exit passed the Senate of the Republic in March 2022.

Alegre Salazar launched a campaign in 2021 for the 2022 election to the Governorship of Quintana Roo in 2022. However, his nomination bid sank after an allegation of domestic violence led to him temporarily losing custody of his children, and Mara Lezama won the Morena nomination en route to being elected. While he had been serving as the presidential liaison to the Tren Maya project after leaving the Chamber of Deputies, he withdrew from public life—with the exception of his Denuncia Ciudadana radio program—in the wake of the allegations.

== Death ==
Alegre Salazar died on 5 November 2022 in his Cancún home as a result of cardiac arrest; the news was announced on Radio Turquesa. President López Obrador was in the Quintana Roo state capital of Chetumal when the news was received and spoke to Gastón Alegre by telephone. Alegre Salazar is survived by his two children.
