= Raúl Sánchez Díaz Martell =

Mexican politician (1915–2011)

5th Governor of Baja California
- In office 1965–1971
- Preceded by: Gustavo Aubanel Vallejo
- Succeeded by: Milton Castellanos Everardo

Personal details
- Born: 15 April 1915 Guadalajara, Jalisco
- Died: 17 April 2011 (aged 96) Mexicali, Baja California
- Party: Institutional Revolutionary Party (PRI)

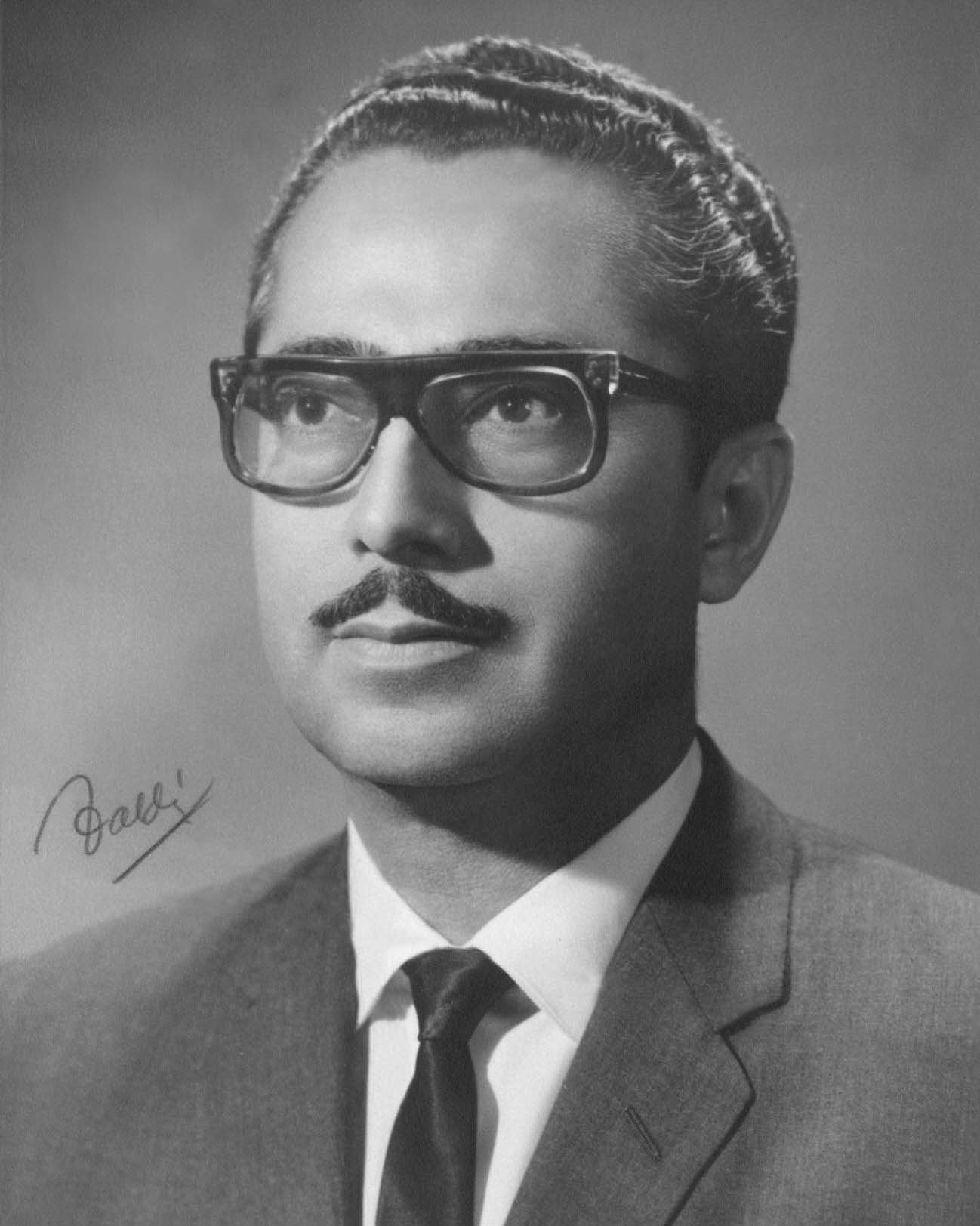
Raúl Sánchez Díaz Martell

Raúl Sánchez Díaz Martell (15 April 1915 – 17 April 2011) was the Governor of Baja California from 1965 to 1971. He died in Mexicali.
