= Juan Fernández Segui =

Spanish fitness coach and manager

Personal information
- Full name: Juan Antonio Fernández Segui
- Date of birth: July 18, 1947 (age 79)
- Place of birth: Madrid, Spain

Managerial career
- Years: Team
- 1974–1977: Granada CF (Assistant)
- 1977–1979: C.D. FAS
- 1979–1980: Burgos CF

Juan Antonio Fernández Segui (born July 18, 1947) is a Spanish fitness coach and manager. He was the manager of C.D. FAS and Burgos CF.
