= Javier Barros Sierra =

Rector of the National Autonomous University of Mexico
- In office 5 May 1966 – 5 May 1970
- Preceded by: Ignacio Chávez Sánchez
- Succeeded by: Pablo González Casanova

Personal details
- Born: 25 February 1915 Mexico City, Mexico
- Died: 15 August 1971 (aged 56) Mexico City, Mexico
- Education: National Autonomous University of Mexico
- Profession: Engineer

Javier Barros Sierra (25 February 1915 – 5 May 1971) was a Mexican engineer and rector of the National Autonomous University of Mexico during the 1968 Tlatelolco massacre.

== Career ==
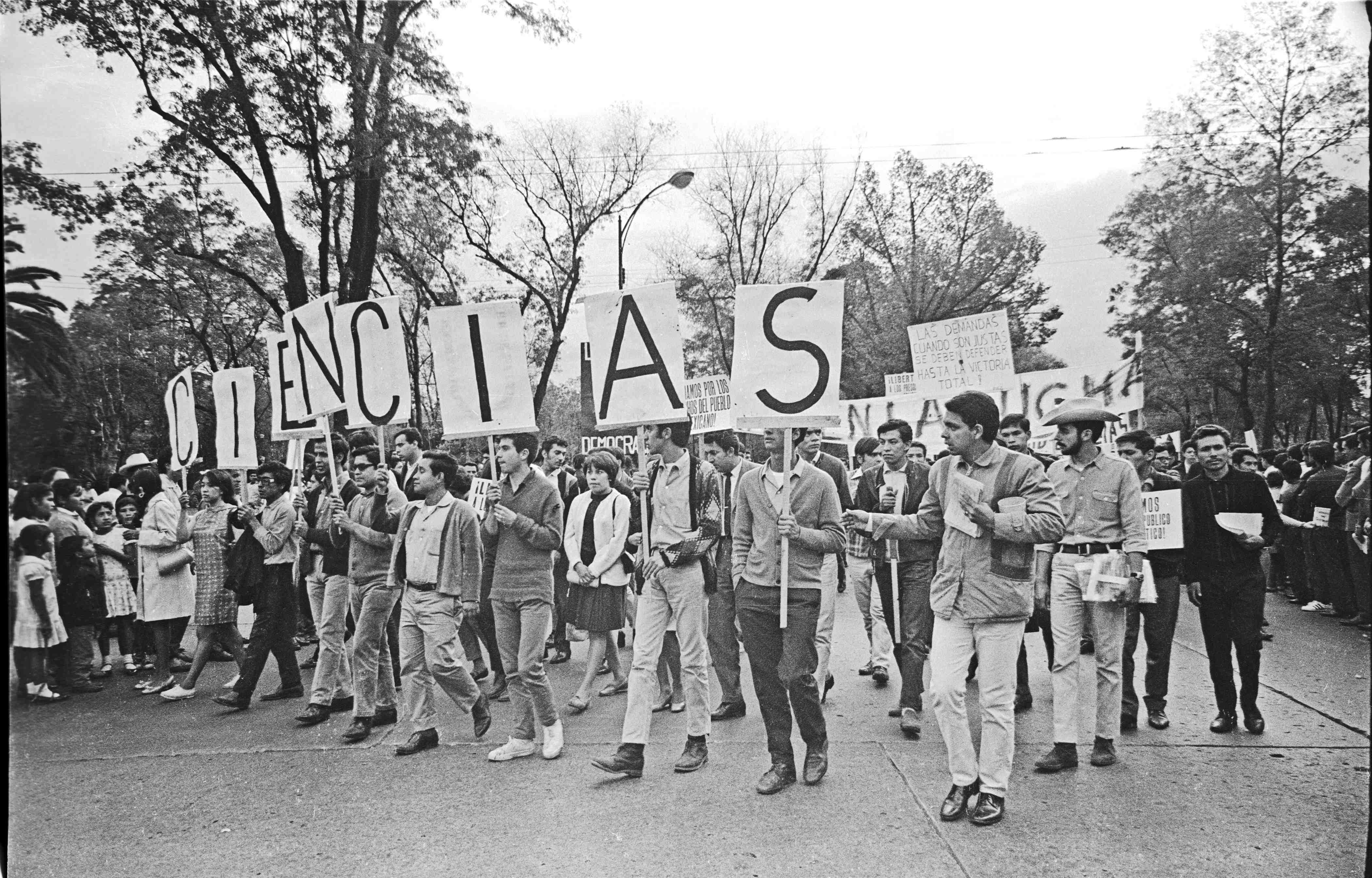
When he worked as Rector of UNAM, Barros Sierra had to defend the autonomy of the university and defend students from the prosecution of the Mexican Federal Government

Born in Mexico City, he studied civil engineering at the National Autonomous University of Mexico. He became president of the student society of the Faculty of Sciences in 1936 and University Counsellor in 1938. He taught for more than 20 years in the Escuela Nacional Preparatoria (a high school of UNAM) and the National School of Engineering (later Faculty of Engineering), of whom he was director from 1955 to 1958. He became Rector on May 5, 1966. During his rectorship, the government and the army entered Ciudad Universitaria, UNAM's main campus. In protest of these actions and the indiscriminate beating of UNAM's students, he resigned his post on September 23, 9 days before the massacre in Tlatelolco. He was reinstated as Rector after the liberation of CU, a post he held until May 5, 1970.

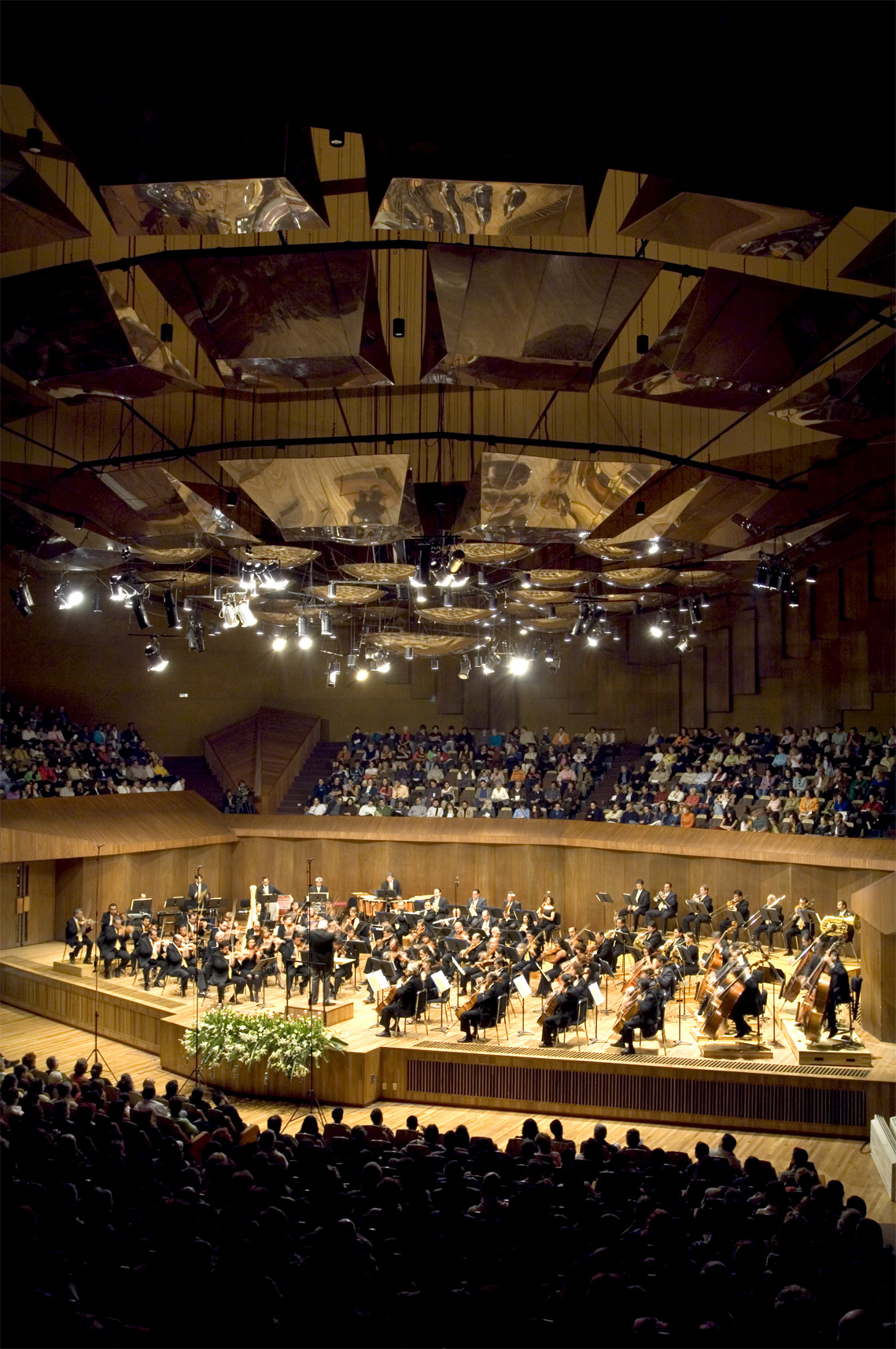
Barros Sierra pushed the development of UNAM's Orquestra
