= Eligio Esquivel Méndez =

Second governor of the state of Baja California, Mexico

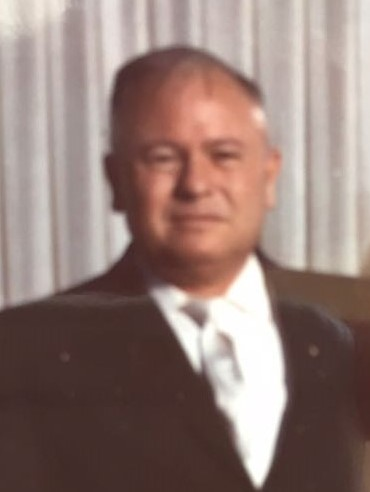

3rd Governor of Baja California
- In office November 12, 1959 – December 17, 1964
- Preceded by: Braulio Maldonado Sández
- Succeeded by: Gustavo Aubanel Vallejo

Personal details
- Born: 31 October 1903 Mérida, Yucatán, Mexico
- Died: 17 December 1964 (aged 61) El Centro, California, U.S.
- Party: Institutional Revolutionary Party
- Education: National Autonomous University of Mexico
- Profession: Politician, civil engineer

Eligio Esquivel Méndez (31 October 1908 – 17 December 1964) was a Mexican politician and engineer who served as the Governor of Baja California from 1959 to 1964.

== Biography ==
Eligio Esquivel Méndez was born in Mérida, Yucatán. He studied at the National Autonomous University of Mexico, where he earned a civil engineering degree in 1933. He was selected by president Lázaro Cárdenas to head a commission providing technical support to various Latin American countries. While working with the commission, he was honored by the government of Bolivia upon the completion of the dam creating La Angostura Lake in the Cochabamba Department of that country.

He directed the construction of the Morelos and Matamoros dams in Mexico. In 1943, he assumed management of the Colorado River Irrigation District, a position he held until 1957. He also participated in the construction of the Matamoros and Galeana reservoirs.

He was elected as the second governor of the state of Baja California and took office in November 1959. Esquivel was a member of the Institutional Revolutionary Party (PRI) and was backed by term-limited incumbent governor Braulio Maldonado. The election was marked by protests as members of the opposition party, the National Action Party (PAN), accused the PRI of vote rigging.

As governor, he made efforts to revitalize the border town of Tijuana, which had gained a reputation for vice. He was also known for his work with hydraulic infrastructure, which addressed the serious problem of soil salinization in the Mexicali Valley. He died in office of an apparent heart attack while visiting El Centro, California and was succeeded by interim governor Gustavo Aubanel Vallejo.
