= Juan Fernández Albarrán =

Mexican politician and lawyer

- Born: January 10, 1901; Toluca, State of Mexico
- Died: March 27, 1972 (aged 71)
- Occupation(s): politician and lawyer
- Known for: governor of the State of Mexico from 1963 to 1969

Juan Fernández Albarrán (January 10, 1901 – March 27, 1972) was a Mexican politician and lawyer affiliated with the Institutional Revolutionary Party (PRI). He was governor of the State of Mexico from 1963 to 1969.

== Early years ==
Juan Fernández Albarrán was born on January 11, 1901, in Toluca, State of Mexico. He completed his education from elementary school to high school in Toluca. He later moved to Mexico City to study law at the Faculty of Jurisprudence of the National Autonomous University of Mexico.

Juan started his career as an agent of the Public Prosecutor's Office and later became a judge of the Superior Court of Justice in the states of Veracruz and Durango. He was also the general secretary of the government of the State of Mexico from 1937 to 1941, during the governorship of Wenceslao Labra García, and was a senior officer of the agrarian department.

== Political career ==
Juan Fernández Albarrán served as the municipal president of Toluca from 1942 to 1943. He was also federal deputy from 1943 to 1946 in the XXXIX legislature representing the 7th district of the State of Mexico. From 1952 to 1958 he was senator of the Republic in the Congress of the Union in the XLII and XLIII legislature representing the State of Mexico.

== Governor of the State of Mexico ==
Juan was elected governor of the State of Mexico in the 1963 state elections. He held office from September 16, 1963, to September 15, 1969. During his governorship, the Escuela Normal Superior and the new Government Palace of the State of Mexico were built, transforming the old building into the Palace of Justice of the State of Mexico. He additionally carried out the remodeling of the rectory of the Autonomous University of the State of Mexico and the Municipal Palace of Toluca and initiated the construction of the Paseo Tollocan in the state capital.
