= Francisco Velasco Curiel =

Mexican politician

- Born: 1922
- Died: 2004 (aged 81–82)
- Education: Escuela Nacional Preparatoria; National Autonomous University of Mexico
- Political party: Institutional Revolutionary Party

Francisco Velasco Curiel (1922 - 1984) was a Mexican politician, member of the Institutional Revolutionary Party and member of the Agricultural Development Committee.

Curiel was privately educated at the Escuela Nacional Preparatoria and attended university at the National Autonomous University of Mexico, both in Mexico City.

He served as the Governor of Colima from 1961 to 1967. As Governor, he was instrumental in setting up the State of Colima School to provide an education for poor people.
