= Salomón González Blanco =

Mexican politician (1900–1992)

Senator for Chiapas
- In office 1979–1982

Governor of Chiapas
- In office 9 December 1977 – 28 November 1979

Senator for Chiapas
- In office 1976–1979

Secretary of Labour and Social Welfare
- In office 1958–1970

Justice of the Supreme Court
- In office 1935–1941

Personal details
- Born: 22 April 1900 Catazajá, Chiapas, Mexico
- Died: 17 March 1992 (aged 91) Mexico City, Mexico
- Political party: PRI
- Occupation: Lawyer and politician
- Awards: Belisario Domínguez Medal

Salomón González Blanco (22 April 1900 – 17 March 1992) was a Mexican lawyer and politician affiliated with the Institutional Revolutionary Party (PRI). He served 12 years as Secretary of Labour and Social Welfare, in addition to terms in the Senate, as a Supreme Court justice and as governor of Chiapas.

== Career ==
Salomón González Blanco was born in Catazajá, Chiapas, in 1900. He graduated from the law school of the National Autonomous University of Mexico (UNAM) in 1927.

In 1934 he served four months in the Senate as an alternate senator for Tabasco.

His career in the judiciary began in 1931 with his appointment to the Superior Court of Justice of Tabasco, followed by an appointment to the Supreme Court of Justice of the Nation (1935–1941). At the end of his supreme court term, he served on the Superior Court of Justice of the Federal District from 1941 to 1947.

In 1947 he began working at the Secretariat of Labour and Social Welfare (STPS). In 1958 he was appointed secretary of labour, a position that he held under three successive presidents (Ruiz Cortines, López Mateos and Díaz Ordaz) until 1970.

In the 1976 general election he was elected to the Senate for his home state. In 1977, however, he resigned his Senate seat to replace Jorge de la Vega Domínguez as governor of Chiapas. He held the governorship from 9 December 1977 to 28 November 1979, when he was in turn replaced by Juan Sabines Gutiérrez. He returned to the Senate until 1982, the end of the term for which he had been elected.

In 1984, he was awarded the Senate's Belisario Domínguez Medal for his lifetime's work in public service.

Salomón González Blanco died in Mexico City on 17 March 1992, aged 91.

== Family ==
González Blanco was married to Josefa Garrido Canabal. They had four children, including Patrocinio González Garrido, who served as governor of Chiapas from 1988 to 1993.
