= Agustín Olachea =

Mexican general

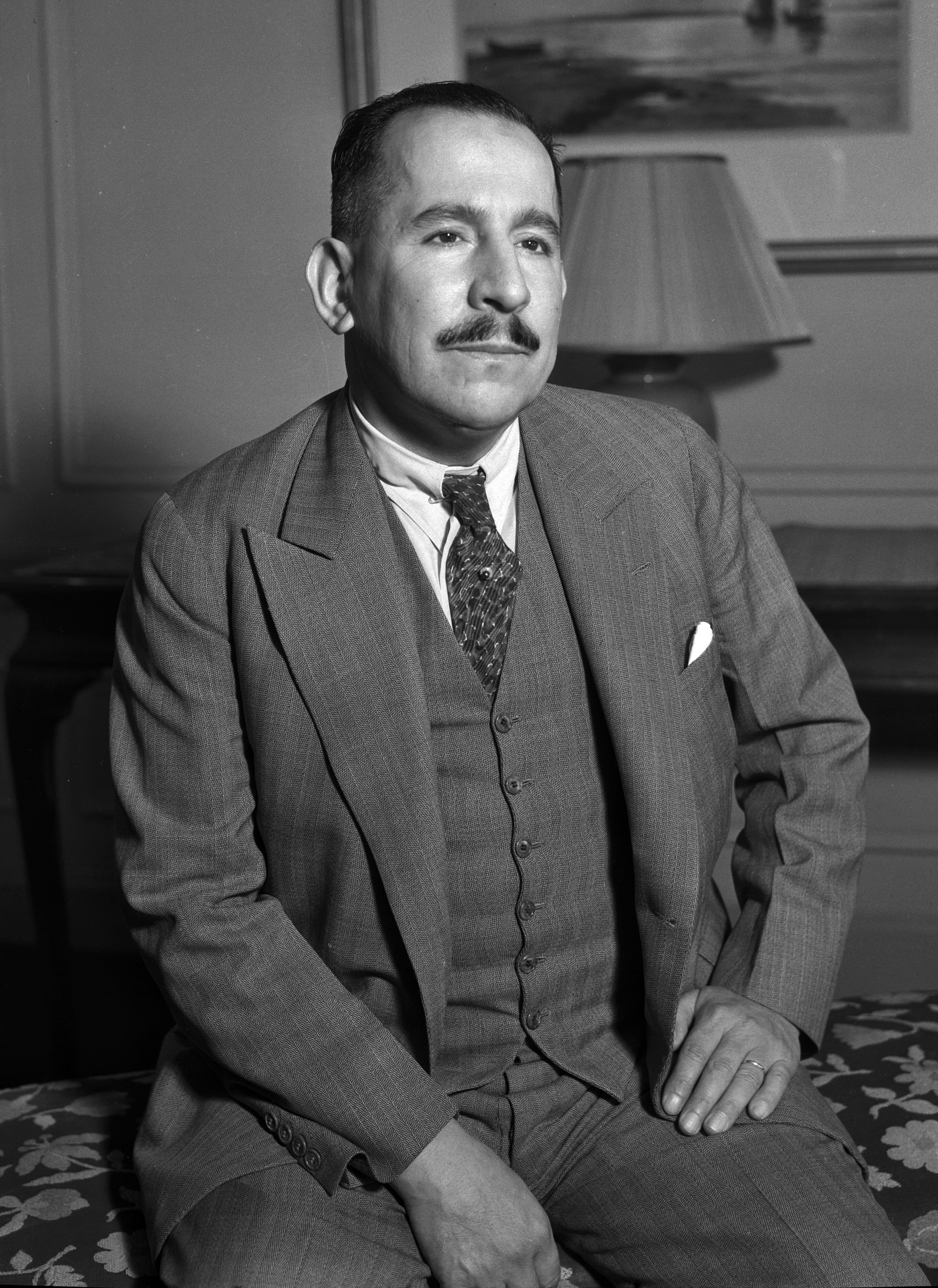
- Olachea in 1932
- Born: September 3, 1890; Todos Santos, Baja California Sur
- Died: April 13, 1974 (aged 83); La Paz, Baja California Sur
- Spouse: Ana María Borbón Yañez
- Military career
- Allegiance: Mexico
- Branch: Mexican Armed Forces
- Rank: General

José Agustín Olachea Avilés (September 3, 1890 – April 13, 1974) was a Mexican general who supported Lázaro Cárdenas for president. During the Cárdenas years he served as Governor of the Federal North Territory of Baja California, having previously filled the same post for Baja California Sur as a member of the social-democratic Institutional Revolutionary Party. This second gubernatorial term came during a period of rising hostility toward the Chinese population in Mexicali. Later, Olachea Avilés acted as Secretary of Defense under Adolfo López Mateos.

In 1946, he was re-elected to a second, ten-year term as Governor of Baja California Sur.

While still a young captain in the Mexican Armed Forces, Olachea Avilés had married 16-year-old Ana María Borbón Yañez (1898–1982) in Guadalajara, Jalisco, with whom he had children.

He was himself, through the paternal line, a second-generation Mexican of Basque descent, and a member of an extensive family still scattered across the Baja California Peninsula and in parts of Southern California.

== See also ==
- List of governors of dependent territories in the 20th century
