= Enrique Olivares Santana =

Mexican politician

Governor of Aguascalientes
- In office December 1, 1962 – November 30, 1968
- Preceded by: Luis Ortega Douglas
- Succeeded by: Francisco Guel Jiménez

Secretary of the Interior
- In office May 17, 1979 – November 30, 1982
- President: José López Portillo
- Preceded by: Jesús Reyes Heroles
- Succeeded by: Manuel Bartlett Díaz

General Secretary of the Institutional Revolutionary Party
- In office February 27, 1968 – December 7, 1970
- President: Alfonso Martínez Domínguez
- Preceded by: Fernando Díaz Durán
- Succeeded by: Vicente Fuentes Díaz

Deputy of the Congress of the Union for the 2nd district of Aguascalientes
- In office September 1, 1958 – August 31, 1961
- Preceded by: Alberto Alcalá de Lira
- Succeeded by: Carmen Araiza López

Personal details
- Born: August 8, 1920 Pabellón de Arteaga, Mexico
- Died: 18 March 2004 (aged 83) Mexico City, D.F., Mexico
- Party: PRI
- Spouse: Belén Ventura
- Children: Héctor Hugo; Elsa Arcelia; César Enrique (died, aged 21); Dora Leticia; Teodoro Ulises
- Parent(s): Teodoro Olivares Calzada; Julia Santana Delgadillo
- Relatives: Anastasio Olivares and Nieves Calzada (paternal grandparents); Florencio Santana and Melquiades Delgadillo (maternal grandparents)
- Occupation: Politician and teacher

Enrique Olivares Santana (8 August 1920 – 18 March 2004) was a Mexican teacher, diplomat, and politician who was governor of Aguascalientes (1962—1968), a member of the Institutional Revolutionary Party (PRI) and Secretary of the Interior (SEGOB, 1979—1982).

== Personal life and education ==
Enrique Olivares Santana was born in the ejido of San Luis de Letras, Rincón de Romos, Aguascalientes, on August 22, 1920. His parents, Teodoro Olivares and Julia Santana, were es:campesinos, or farmworkers. As a young man, Don Teodoro fought for the government during the Cristero War. He was the first General Secretary of the Liga de Comunidades Agrarias de Aguascalientes (Augascalientes League of Agrarian Communities) in 1932, and in 1935 he was elected municipal president of Rincón de Romos. He joined the PNR (predecessor of PRI) in 1930; Enrique's uncle, Ricardo Olivares, became the state secretary of PNR in 1932. Enrique had seven siblings: Emilia, Juan, Humberto, Toña, Adolia, Víctor, and Teresa; Enrique and Humberto were particularly close, and both became teachers.

Enrique met his future wife, Belén Ventura, when he was 14 and she was 13. Both attended the Escuela Normal Rural para Maestros (Rural Normal School) in San Marcos, Zacatecas. Many people in the community said the students were communists, and that women should not be taught to read and write. They finished their studies in 1938, and Enrique went to Valladolid, Aguascalientes, to work.

Enrique and Bélen were married on July 13, 1943 and had five children: Héctor Hugo, Elsa Arcelia, César Enrique, Dora Leticia, and Teodoro Ulises. César Enrique died in a plane crash at the age of 20. They lived in Pabellón de Arteaga until he was elected governor.

Olivares died on March 18, 2004.

== Political and professional career ==
As a teacher, Olivares Santana was active in union activities from 1944 to 1961. He began his political activities in 1946 when he direct the presidential campaign of Miguel Alemán in Aguascalientes, and from 1950 to 1953 he served as a deputy in the state legislature. He became president of the PRI in Aguascalientes in 1952.

Olivares was elected to the federal XLIV Legislature from 1958 to 1961. He declared his candidacy for governor on April 16, 1962, where he served from 1962 until 1968. From 1968 to 1970 he served as Secretary General of PRI. During the presidency of Luis Echeverría (1970-1976), Oliveres was president of the Gran Comisión del Senado de la República (Great Commission of the Senate of the Republic. Under President José López Portillo, Oliveares began as General of Director of Banobras, and in 1979 he became Secretary of the Interior.

Olivares was Ambassador to Cuba from 1985 to 1987, and he was the first Mexican Ambassador to the Vatican, from 1992 to 1996.

== Legacy ==
- The city hall in Pabellón de Arteaga Municipality bears his name.
- ENRIQUE OLIVARES SANTANA A 100 AÑOS DE SU NACIMIENTO (YouTube video) (in Spanish)

== Bibliography ==
- Vital Díaz Alberto, Enrique Olivares Santana: Un hombre de la revolución y de la república, Editorial UAA, 2006, IBN 970-728-043-3
- Krauze, Enrique, Biografía del Poder, Tusquets edición 2013

== See also ==
- Aguascalientes Municipality
