= Fernando López Arias =

Mexican politician

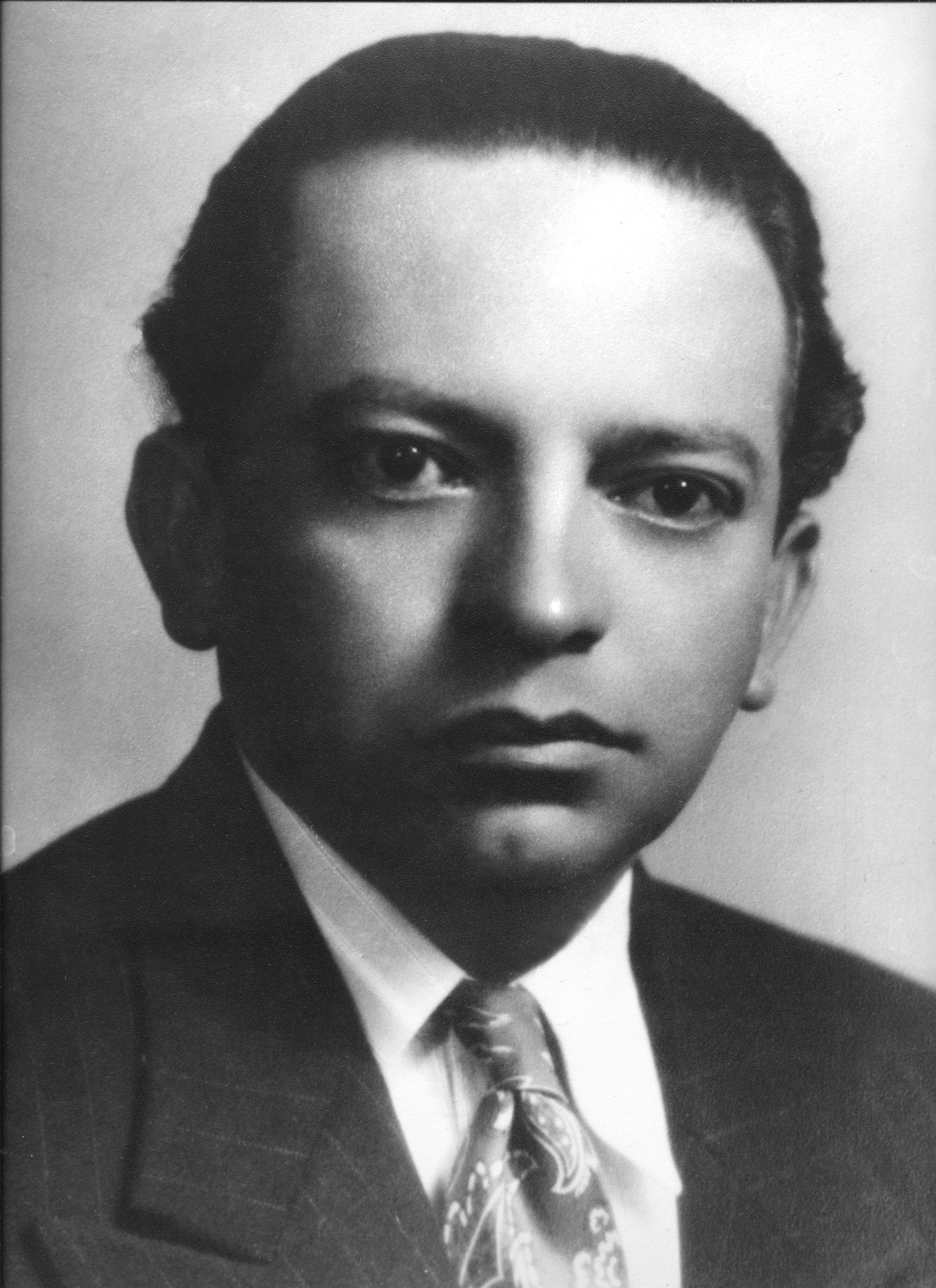
Fernando López Arias

Fernando López Arias (August 8, 1905 – July 3, 1978) was a Mexican politician member of the Institutional Revolutionary Party and governor of Veracruz from 1962 to 1968.
