= Governor of Baja California =

Chief executive of the Mexican state of Baja California

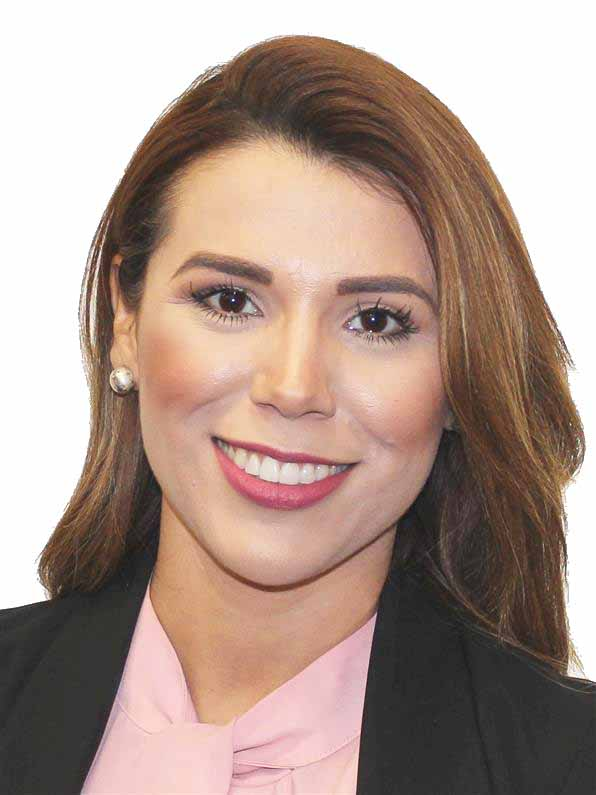
- Incumbent; Marina del Pilar Ávila Olmeda since November 1, 2021
- Inaugural holder: Alfonso García González
- Formation: November 26, 1952

The governor of Baja California represents the executive branch of the government of the state of Baja California, Mexico, per the state's constitution. The official title is "Free and Sovereign State of Baja California" (Estado Libre y Soberano de Baja California), and the position is democratically elected for a period of 6 years, and is not re-electable. From 1953 to 2019, the governor's term began November 1 of the year of the election and finishes October 31, six years later. To coincide with the federal elections, the law was changed, decreeing there would be an election in 2019, another in 2021, and yet another in 2024 before reverting to a six-year term.

== History of the position ==
The present state of Baja California had its origin in 1888, when then President Porfirio Díaz, decreed the division of the Federal Territory of Baja California into two districts, north and south. The capital and most of the population of the old territory had been in the south, closer to the area's maritime passage. The north was mostly isolated by the sea and by the desert. As the population grew toward the end of the 19th century, the territory was divided into two districts.

The initial capital of the North District was the port of Ensenada, and each one of the two districts remained governed by a political leader appointed by the territory, although officially they continued being territorial a single unit.

The constitution of 1917 maintained the existence of the Federal Territory divided into two districts but changed the denomination of the Chief Executive into Governor, maintaining this division until 1931 when finally two independent Districts were formed from the Federal Territories.

Finally in 1952, the northern territory became the Free and Sovereign State of Baja California; starting 1953 the governor was elected for a six-year term. The Constitution of Mexico was changed in the 2010s, demanding that gubernatorial elections coincide with presidential elections (2018, 2024, 2030, etc.) Thus in 2014 the law was changed so there would be an election in 2019 and another in 2021. Jaime Bonilla (Morena), who took office on November 15, 2019, argued that he had been elected for a five-year term, from November 1, 2019, to September 20, 2024. A referendum was held to extend his term to 2024, which passed with 82% of the vote but only 1.9% citizen participation. The legislature ratified the decision with the so-called Ley Bonilla (Bonilla Law) in a 30-minute session. The Supreme Court of Justice of the Nation in a unanimous decision nullified this law on May 11, 2020, meaning Bonilla′s term would expire in 2021 and his successor would serve from 2021 to 2024. In the 2021 election, which took place on Sunday 6th 2021, mayor and former deputy for Mexicali, Marina Del Pillar was elected as Bonilla’s successor

== List of governors ==
The individuals that have occupied the governorship of the State of Baja California, in its different denominations, have been the following:

=== Governor of Baja California Territory (1824-1850) ===
- (1825) José María de Echeandía, also Governor of Alta California
- (1829) Manuel Victoria
- (1830) José Mariano Monteverde
- (1830) José María de Echeandía (2nd term)
- (1832) Pío Pico
- (1832) José María de Echeandía (3rd Term)
- (1833) José Figueroa
- (1833) José María de Echeandía (4th Term)
- (1835) Miguel Martínez
- (1837) Francisco Padilla
- (1837) None (Centralist Republic of Mexico)
- (1845) Nicolás Lastra
- (1847) Pío Pico

=== (1851–1917) Chief Executive of the North District of the Federal Territory of Baja California ===
1. (1851): Francisco Javier del Castillo Negrete
2. (1855?): José María Oñate
3. (1856?): Francisco de Paula Ferrer
4. (1854–1856): José María Larroque
5. (1854–1859): José Castro
6. (1859–1861): José Sáenz
7. (1861–1868): Juan Mendoza (México) y Feliciano Ruiz Esparza, Cecilio Zérega
8. (1868): Manuel Clemente Rojo
9. (1876 or 1873): José María Villagrana
10. (1876): José Matías Moreno, Brígido Castejón
11. (1879?) : Ignacio Alas
12. (1888–1894): Luis_Emeterio_Torres
13. (1894–1902): Agustín Sanginés
14. (1902–1903): Abraham Arroniz
15. (1903–1911): Celso Vega
16. (1911): Miguel Mayol
17. (1911): Jacinto Barrera
18. (1911–1912): Manuel Gordillo Escudero
19. (1912–1913): Carlos R. Ptanick
20. (1913): José Dolores Espinoza
21. (1913): Miguel V. Gómez
22. (1913–1914): Francisco N. Vásquez
23. (1914–1915): David Zárate
24. (1915–1917): Esteban Cantú Jiménez

=== (1917–1931) Governors of the North District of the Federal Territory of Baja California ===
1. (1917–1920): Esteban Cantú Jiménez
2. (1920): Luis M. Salazar
3. (1920–1921): Manuel Balarezo
4. (1921): Epigmenio Ibarra Jr.
5. (1921–1922): Lucas B. Rodríguez
6. (1922–1923): José Inocente Lugo
7. (1923–1930): Abelardo L. Rodríguez
8. (1930): José María Tapia Freyding
9. (1930): Arturo M. Bernal Navarrete
10. (1930–1931): Carlos Trejo y Lerdo de Tejada

=== (1931–1952) Governors of the Federal North Territory of Baja California ===
1. (1931): Carlos Trejo y Lerdo de Tejada
2. (1931–1932): Agustín Olachea
3. (1932): Arturo M. Elías
4. (1932–1935): Agustín Olachea
5. (1935–1936): Gildardo Magaña
6. (1936): Gabriel Gavira
7. (1936–1937): Rafael Navarro Cortina
8. (1937–1944): Rodolfo Sánchez Taboada
9. (1944–1946): Juan Felipe Rico Islas
10. (1946–1947): Alberto V. Aldrete
11. (1947–1952): Alfonso García González

=== (1952–present) Governors of the Free and Sovereign State of Baja California ===
1. (1952–1953): Alfonso García González
2. (1953–1959): Braulio Maldonado Sandez
3. (1959–1964): Eligio Esquivel Méndez
4. (1964–1965): Gustavo Aubanel Vallejo
5. (1965–1971): Raúl Sánchez Díaz Martell
6. (1971–1977): Milton Castellanos Everardo
7. (1977–1983): Roberto de la Madrid
8. (1983–1989): Xicoténcatl Leyva Mortera
9. (1989–1989): Oscar Baylón Chacón
10. (1989–1995): Ernesto Ruffo Appel
11. (1995–1998): Héctor Terán Terán
12. (1998–2001): Alejandro González Alcocer
13. (2001–2007): Eugenio Elorduy Walther
14. (2007–2013): José Guadalupe Osuna Millán
15. (2013–2019): Francisco Vega de Lamadrid
16. (2019–2021): Jaime Bonilla Valdez
17. (2021–present): Marina del Pilar Ávila Olmeda
