= 2019 in Mexico =

- Decades: 1990s; 2000s; 2010s; 2020s
- See also: History of Mexico; List of years in Mexico; Timeline of Mexican history

Events of 2019 in Mexico. The article also lists the most important political leaders during the year at both federal and state levels and includes a brief year-end summary of major social and economic issues.

== Incumbents ==
=== President and cabinet ===
- President: Andres Manuel López Obrador MORENA
- Interior Secretary (SEGOB): Olga María del Carmen Sánchez Cordero
- Secretary of Foreign Affairs (SRE): Marcelo Ebrard Casaubón
- Secretary of the Treasury (SHCP):
  - Carlos Manuel Urzúa Macías, until July 9, 2019
  - Arturo Herrera, starting July 10, 2019
- Secretary of Economy (SE): Graciela Márquez Colín
- Secretary of Energy (SENER): Norma Rocío Nahle García
- Secretary of Agriculture (SADER): Víctor Villalobos
- Secretary of Labor (STPS): Luisa María Alcalde Luján
- Education Secretary (SEP): Esteban Moctezuma
- Communications Secretary (SCT): Javier Jiménez Espriú
- Secretary of the Environment (SEMARNAT)
  - Josefa González-Blanco Ortiz-Mena, until May 25, 2019)
  - Víctor Manuel Toledo, starting May 27, 2019
- Tourism Secretary (SECTUR): Miguel Torruco Marqués
- Secretary of the Civil Service (FUNCION PUBLICA): Irma Sandoval-Ballesteros
- Secretary of Health (SALUD): Jorge Alcocer Varela
- Secretary of Agrarian Development and Urban Planning (SEDATU): Román Guillermo Meyer
- Secretary of Welfare (BIENESTAR9: María Luisa Albores González
- Secretary of Culture (CULTURA): Alejandra Frausto Guerrero
- Secretary of Defense (SEDENA): Luis Cresencio Sandoval
- Secretary of Navy (SEMAR): José Rafael Ojeda Durán
- Secretary of Security: Alfonso Durazo Montaño
- Attorney General of Mexico (FGR): Alejandro Gertz Manero

=== Supreme Court ===
- President of the Supreme Court: Arturo Zaldívar Lelo de Larrea (since January 2, 2019)

=== Governors ===
- Aguascalientes: Martín Orozco Sandoval
- Baja California:
  - Francisco Vega de Lamadrid, until October 31
  - Jaime Bonilla MORENA, starting November 1 (Note: There is a dispute about the length of Bonilla's term (two or five years) that must be decided by the National Supreme Court of Justice.)
- Baja California Sur: Carlos Mendoza Davis,
- Campeche:
  - Alejandro Moreno Cárdenas, until June 13
  - Carlos Miguel Aysa González, acting governor, starting June 13
- Chiapas: Rutilio Escandón MORENA
- Chihuahua: Javier Corral Jurado
- Coahuila: Miguel Ángel Riquelme Solís PRI
- Colima: José Ignacio Peralta PRI
- Distrito Federal: Claudia Sheinbaum MORENA
- Durango: José Rosas Aispuro
- Guanajuato: Diego Sinhué Rodríguez Vallejo
- Guerrero: Héctor Astudillo Flores PRI
- Hidalgo: Omar Fayad PRI
- Jalisco: Enrique Alfaro Ramírez, Independent
- México (state): Alfredo del Mazo Maza PRI
- Michoacán: Silvano Aureoles Conejo PRD
- Morelos: Cuauhtémoc Blanco PES
- Nayarit: Antonio Echevarría García PAN
- Nuevo León: Jaime Rodríguez Calderón, Independent
- Oaxaca: Alejandro Murat Hinojosa PRI
- Puebla:
  - Jesús Rodríguez Almeida Interim governor PAN, until January 21
  - Guillermo Pacheco Pulido Acting governor PRI, January 21 – July 31
  - Miguel Barbosa Huerta MORENA, starting August 1.
- Querétaro: Francisco Domínguez Servién PAN
- Quintana Roo: Carlos Joaquín González PAN
- San Luis Potosí: Juan Manuel Carreras PRI
- Sinaloa: Quirino Ordaz Coppel PRI
- Sonora: Claudia Pavlovich Arellano PRI
- Tabasco: Adán Augusto López Hernández MORENA, starting January 1
- Tamaulipas: Francisco Javier García Cabeza de Vaca PAN
- Tlaxcala: Marco Antonio Mena Rodríguez PRI
- Veracruz: Cuitláhuac García Jiménez MORENA
- Yucatán: Mauricio Vila Dosal PAN
- Zacatecas: Alejandro Tello Cristerna PRI

=== LXIV Legislature of the Mexican Congress ===
==== President of the Senate ====
- Martí Batres (Morena) MORENA, until September 1, 2019
- Mónica Fernández Balboa MORENA, starting September 1, 2019

==== President of the Chamber of Deputies ====
- Porfirio Muñoz Ledo MORENA, until September 3
- Laura Angélica Rojas Hernández PAN, starting September 5

== Events ==
=== January ===
- January: Yalitza Aparicio, star of Alfonso Cuarón's 2018 film Roma, appears on the cover of Vogue México.
- January 1: New Year's Day.
  - Three new autonomous indigenous municipalities added to the state of Morelos.
  - IWRG 23rd Anniversary Show wrestling show in Naucalpan, State of Mexico. Sin Piedad (2019) is held in Mexico City.
- January 3:
  - Mayor Alejandro Aparicio Santiago of Tlaxiaco, Oaxaca was shot dead just hours after being sworn in. Four others were injured. A suspect was arrested in what appears to be a drug-related shooting.
  - A temple built between 1000 and 1260 CE and dedicated to Xipe Totec (Flayed Lord) is discovered in Ndachjian-Tehuacan, Puebla.
- January 18: An oil pipeline explodes in the state of Hidalgo. One hundred and thirty-four people were killed.
- January 20: The body of journalist Rafael Murua Manriquez was found in Baja California Sur as the country sets new homicide record of 33,341 murders (up 33%) in 2018.
- January 21:
  - An earthquake with a magnitude of 5.8 hits 88 km southwest of Salina Cruz, Oaxaca.
  - Guillermo Pacheco Pulido is named interim governor of Puebla.
- January 22: 21:06 local time, Popocateptl volcano spews ash up 4 km high.
- January 31: The Guerra de Dinastías (literally "War of the Dynasties" or "War of the Families") wrestling event takes place in Naucalpan, State of Mexico.

=== February ===
- February 1: An earthquake with a magnitude of 6.6 hit off the coast of Chiapas.
- February 2: Guillermo Padrés Elías, former Governor of Sonora (PAN) 2009-2015 is released from prison after his 2016 arrest for allegedly embezzling US$8.9 million.
- February 4: Constitution Day celebrated.
- February 12: Joaquín "El Chapo" Guzmán, Mexico's most wanted criminal, was sentenced to life imprisonment in Brooklyn, NY on multiple drug chagres. Guzmán had previously alleged that both presidents Felipe Calderón and Enrique Peña Nieto had taken millions in bribes from the Sinaloa Cartel.
- February 15: "Bahidorá" music festival begins in Las Estacas, Morelos.*March 16: "Vive Latino" music festival begins in Mexico City.
- February 16: Radio announcer Reynaldo López and reporter Carlos Cota were shot in Hermosillo, Sonora, in an attack that left López dead and Cota in critical condition.
- February 17: Five people have been killed and five more wounded after gunmen burst into a bar Cancun and opened fire. The gunmen are said to belong to the Jalisco New Generation cartel.
- February 18:
  - An earthquake with a magnitude of 4.7 strikes 46 km west of Colima.
  - 2019 Morelos Open professional tennis tournament begins in Cuernavaca.
- February 19: Samir Flores, a leading opponent of the construction of a thermoelectric plant in Yecapixtla, Morelos, was murdered outside his home in Amilcingo, Temoac. Earlier in the week, Rubén Fajardo, another opponent of the plant, was murdered in Jiutepec.
- February 21: A German court fines two ex-employers of German gun maker Heckler & Koch for illegal gun sales to Mexico.
- February 23 & February 24: Voters in Morelos, Puebla, and Tlaxcala approve the construction of a thermoelectric power plant in Huexca, Yecapixtla, Morelos (33,174–22,355).
- February 23: EDC music festival begins at Autodromo Hermanos Rodriguez in San Luis Potosi.
- February 25:
  - Roma, the Mexican movie directed by Alfonso Cuarón, wins Oscars for best foreign language film, best director, and cinematography.
  - 2019 Abierto Mexicano Telcel professional tennis tournament begins in Acapulco.
- February 26: The government auctions off 196 luxury and bullet-proof cars, bringing in US$3.25 million.
- February 27: Alejandro González Iñárritu, a Mexican film director (Amores perros and Birdman), is named president of the jury at the Cannes Film Festival.
- February 28: Two people were killed and 10 wounded in a shooting in Sofia bar in Cuernavaca, Morelos. Several popular bars and nightclubs were subsequently closed in protest against insecurity. The police chief was fired on March 2 for the same reason.

=== March ===
- March 2: "Nrmal" music festival in the Deportivo Estado Mayor Presidencial in the State of Mexico.
- March 4: Yukaima González, a Wixarika indigenous becomes the first Indigeous to be chosen queen of the Nayarit fair.
- March 5: Mexican scientists discover a cave at the Mayan ruins of Chichen Itza containing around 200 ceramic vessels in nearly perfect condition. They are believed to be 1,000 years old.
- March 6: Nuevo Leon passes a law to prohibit abortion by asserting the right to life from conception.
- March 8:
  - A ruptured sewer line causes a health alert in Puerto Vallarta, Jalisco. The 48" sewage line collapsed on March 3.
  - 23 Guatemalan immigrants, including two children, are killed and 33 injured as a bus turns over in Chiapas.
  - 594 paintings that were stolen from Mexico in the 1960s and 1970s are returned by the government of Italy.
- March 9: An armed group bursts into a bar in Salamanca, Guanajuato) during government operation against El Marro, leader of the cartel Santa Rosa de Lima, dedicated to the theft of gasoline in Mexico. Fifteen killed, five wounded.
- March 10:
  - At least seven people are executed in Colonia Clavijero, Puebla during a war between the Jalisco Nueva Generación and Los Sinaloenses cartels.
  - The 2019 Rally Mexico in Guanajuato ends in victory for the French team.
- March 11: 23 migrants kidnapped from a bus in Tamaulipas.
- March 13: The U.S. State Department issues an advisory about "Spring Break" in Mexico.
- March 14:
  - At 2:30 p.m. the Popocatépetl volcano sent a column of ashes five kilometers into the air. A smaller explosion occurred four days later, March 18.
  - About 20 SUVs supposedly belong to the Jalisco New Generation Cartel participated in the Carnaval parade in the Xalapa, Veracruz. Videos of hooded men carrying heavy-caliber firearms circulated in social media.
- March 15: Santiago Barroso is the 4th journalist killed this year. He worked for 'San Luis Hoy' on 91.1 FM Río Digital in San Luis Río Colorado, Sonora.
- March 16:
  - "Vive Latino" music festival begins in Mexico City.
  - The 23rd Rey de Reyes (2019) professional wrestling event took place in Puebla.
- March 17: Dorian Peralta, a business professor at Universidad Autónoma de La Laguna in Torreón, Coahuila, set a new record after giving class for 72 hours, 22 minutes, 36 seconds straight. The accomplishment will be listed in the Guinness World Records.
- March 18:
  - Benito Juarez's birthday celebrated (Monday).
  - Mexican oil expropriation
- March 19:
  - 21:38 local time, fragments of the dome of Popocateptl shoot within 1aone and a half-mile radius. Due to continuing activity, on March 28, based on the analysis of the available information, the Scientific Advisory Committee of the Popocatépetl volcano recommended changing the phase of the Yellow Volcanic Warning Light Phase 2 to Yellow Phase 3, which is a preventive measure against the observed changes.
  - Viridiana Mendoza López, a student in the National Polytechnic Institute of Mexico, died on the campus, raising questions about the emergency services for students.
- March 21:
  - Between 5:31 and 10:30 a.m., forty-two earthquakes with magnitudes ranging from 1.9 to 4.4, were reported in Oaxaca.
  - In a landmark decision for freedom of the press, the Supreme Court rules that the attorney general of Veracruz cannot block the Twitter account of a journalist.
- March 22:
  - "Pa'l Norte" music festival begins in Parque Funidora, Monterrey.
  - The Senate bans marriage involving children younger than 18.
- March 23: The Diablos Rojos del México (Red Devils) open their new Alfredo Harp Helú baseball stadium in Mexico City.
- March 24:
  - Mexican security forces arrest Agustín Medina Soto, a suspected Santa Rosa de Lima cartel operator who worked as a liaison with authorities in Celaya, Guanajuato.
  - A leak from a clandestine gasoline operation is detected in Tlahuelilpan, Hidalgo two months after the Tlahuelilpan pipeline explosion that left 135 dead.
- March 25:
  - President Andrés Manuel López Obrador sends letters to King Felipe VI of Spain and Pope Francis demanding they apologize for the atrocities committed during the Conquest of Mexico.
  - Three municipal employees in Salvatierra, Guanajuato are gunned down in their car.
  - Archeologists say that a new discovery at the base of the Templo Mayor in Mexico City could lead to the discovery of an Aztec emperor's tomb.
- March 27: The Constitution is amended, creating Guardia Nacional (National Guard).
- March 28:
  - After an explosion recorded this morning by the Popocatepetl volcano, the warning light went up from yellow phase 2 to yellow phase 3, the National Center for Disaster Prevention (Cenapred) reported at a press conference.
  - Mexico's largest hotel and resort conglomerate, Nayarit-based Grupo Vidanta, has announced the launch of a Mexican cruise line, Vidanta Cruises.
  - The first contracts have been signed for the Mayan Train project, the general manager of the National Tourism Development Fund (Fonatur) announced yesterday.
  - 1,468 people in Guadalajara broke the Guinness World Records for the most people at a tequila tasting.
  - Three fishermen were injured in a confrontation with the Mexican Navy in San Felipe, Baja California. The fishermen were protesting the presence of a boat operated by the environmental group Sea Shepherd Conservation Society, who were trying to protect the Vaquita porpoise in the Gulf of California, protected since 2015.
  - The Congress of the Union approves a measure to do away with presidential immunity (el fuero) while preserving immunity for themselves.
- March 29: Mexican sports journalist Omar Ivan Camacho, 35, who worked with Noticieros Altavoz de Chavez Radiocast and helped run the Evora Sport website, has been found dead in the municipality of Salvador Alvarado, Sinaloa. He becomes the seventh journalist murdered in Mexico since Andrés Manuel López Obrador became president on December 1, 2018.
- March 30:
  - "Vaiven" music festival in Tlaquilquitengo, Jojutla, Morelos.
  - The National Seismological Service has reported 45 earthquakes ranging in magnitude from 3.2 to 4.1 in six states: (Oaxaca: 25. including one in Matías Romero with 4.0 M_{w}), (Chiapas: 8, including Tonalá and Ciudad Hidalgo, 4.0 M_{w}), (Guerrero: 7), (Colima: 2), (Veracruz: 2, including Las Choapas 4.1 M_{w} ), and (Sonora: 1 in Nacozari de García Municipality 3.8 M_{w}).
  - Delfino Sánchez Zavala, the delegate-elect from Tejalpa, Jiutepec, Morelos, was shot and killed outside his store. The meeting of the town council planned for Sunday, March 31 was canceled.
  - Eight state police were kidnapped by armed men in Xicotepec, Juan Galindo (municipality), Puebla.

=== April ===
- April 4:
  - The Senate declares that changes to Article 19 of the Constitution of Mexico are constitutional. The reform expands the definition of serious crimes to include corruption, crimes related to hydrocarbons, home invasion, kidnapping, and murder, among others.
  - A MXN $46 million (peso) robbery was carried out in three minutes at the Guanajuato airport.
  - The government of Catalonia announces that it supports President Lopez Obrador's request that Spain apologize for its genocide during the Conquest.
- April 5: President Andrés Manuel López Obrador declares that the National Guard will be headed by an active-duty military leader.
- April 6: "Ceremonia" music festival in Foro Pegaso, Toluca.
- April 7:
  - Daylight saving time begins; move clock one hour forward.
  - Puerto Vallarta Marathon 2019.
- April 8: President Andrés Manuel López Obrador announces that the government of Mexico will provide guards for ex-presidents Vicente Fox and Felipe Calderón.
- April 9:
  - Defense of Veracruz, 1914.
  - The Tianguis Turístico (Tourist Fair) in Acapulco reports record turnout of 47,000 business appointments.
  - Michelle Bachelet, the United Nations High Commissioner for Human Rights has promised that the UN Human Rights Commission will be involved in the training of the new National Guard.
- April 11: General Luis Rodríguez Bucio is named to head the newly formed National Guard.
- April 13: Mexican super-featherweight boxer Francisco "El Bandido" Vargas defeats American "Lightning" Rod Salka in a fight in Indio, California.
- April 13 & 14: The St. Louis Cardinals and the Cincinnati Reds will play Major League baseball games at the Estadio de Béisbol Monterrey.
- April 14: Palm Sunday; Holy Week begins.
- April 19:
  - 2nd Riviera Nayarit Rock Festival.
  - 13 people, including a one-year-old baby, are killed during a party in Minatitlán, Veracruz. The deaths are believed to be related to a dispute between Los Zetas and Jalisco New Generation Cartel.
- April 22: An earthquake with a magnitude of 5.5 had its epicenter in Pinotepa Nacional, Oaxacca and was felt in Mexico City, where the early warning system did not go off. No damages or injuries have been reported.
- April 23: David Eduardo Otlica Avilés, the mayor of Nahuatzen, Michoacán, is kidnapped and killed.
- April 24:
  - U.S. President Donald Trump accuses Mexican soldiers of pulling guns on members of the United States National Guard in a remote part of Texas on April 13. Trump also renewed his threat to close the border and send more soldiers if Mexico does not block a new caravan of Central American immigrants.
  - Mexican President Andrés Manuel López Obrador announces that construction on the New Mexico City airport will begin on Monday, April 29, and that it will be named Felipe Ángeles (1868-1919).
  - Maricela Vallejo Orea, 27, mayor of Mixtla de Altamirano, Veracruz, is murdered while traveling in a car in Orizaba.
- April 25: Daniela Soto-Innes, 28, has been named The World's Best Female Chef by The World's 50 Best Restaurants list. She is the first Mexican woman to be so honored, and she is also the youngest person to be so honored. She works at Cosme in New York City and is co-owner of Atla in the same city. She also worked at Pujol in Mexico City.
- April 28: Final of 2019 Central American Cricket Championship in Mexico City. Won by Belize national cricket team.
- April 29: Aidée Mendoza Jeronimo, 18, a student at National Autonomous University of Mexico, is killed by a stray bullet in her classroom. Mendoza Jeronimo was from Tempexquixla, Puebla. She was the sixth woman murdered on the university campus in the last two years.
- April 30: Children's Day (Tuesday)
  - Members of the Jalisco New Generation Cartel gave children presents for Children's Day in several municipalities of Veracruz, including Cordoba, Yanga, Cuitláhuac, Rio Blanco, la Perla, and Amatlan. Governor Cuitláhuac García Jiménez has promised an investigation.

=== May ===
- May 1: Labor Day (Wednesday)
  - 40,000 workers march in nine demonstrations for May Day. Napoleón Gómez Urrutia, leader of the Confederación Internacional de Trabajadores (CIT) praised president Andrés Manuel López Obrador while teachers from the Coordinadora Nacional de Trabajadores de la Educación demanded the revocation of the educational reforms instituted by president Enrique Peña Nieto.
  - C.F. Monterrey win the 2019 CONCACAF Champions League.
- May 2:
  - Two tourists and a taxi driver are executed by community police in Las Choapas, Veracruz, after being accused of kidnapping a child.
  - The bodies of ten men and two women are discovered in secret graves in Guasave, Sinaloa.
- May 4:
  - The Houston Astros defeat the Los Angeles Angels 14–2 in a Major League Baseball game in Monterrey. The Astros won 10–4 on May 5.
  - Claudia Sheinbaum of Mítikah has been accused of illegally cutting down 54 trees in Mexico City. She may be fined several million pesos.
- May 5: Commemoration of the Battle of Puebla (Sunday)
  - 4,000 protesters in Mexico City and 30,000 protesters in 30 cities around the country join the highly promoted "Megamarcha contra AMLO." The march in León, Guanajuato was led by former president Vicente Fox.
  - The 2019 Puerto Vallarta Open professional tennis tournament draws to a close.
- May 6: At least 13 people are killed in an airplane crash in the Ocampo Municipality, Coahuila, en route from Las Vegas, Nevada to Monterrey, Nuevo Leon.
- May 7: The United States imposes a 17.5% tariff on Mexican tomatoes.
- May 8: Birthday of Miguel Hidalgo y Costilla, 1753.
  - Interpol announces it is looking for former Puebla governor Mario Plutarco Marín Torres in relation to collaborating in the torture of journalist Lydia Cacho in 2005 after she published information about child exploitation.
  - Businessman Jesús García and another man were killed while two others were injured when they were shot at about 10:00 a.m. in downtown Cuernavaca, Morelos. Garcia was the father of Juan Manuel García Bejarano, who was murdered in 2017 while organizing the traditional Spring Fair in the city.
  - Robbery of gasoline from a Pemex pipeline in Chiapas caused an explosion. Mixed reports are unclear about fatalities. A similar explosion on January 18, 2019 caused 135 deaths.
- May 9:
  - Two days after being diagnosed with cancer, singer Vicente Fernández turned down a liver transplant because he is afraid it may come from a homosexual.
  - UNICEF issues a report that says four children are killed every day in Mexico. Juan Martín Pérez of Redim (Red por los Derechos de la Infancia en México–Network for Child Rights in Mexico) put the figure at three deaths daily.
  - President Andrés Manuel López Obrador announces that Pemex will begin building a refinery in Dos Bocas, Tabasco on July 2, 2019 at a cost of 160 billion pesos. The opposition was quick to denounce the plan.
- May 10: Mother's Day (Friday)
  - Continuing the wave of violence in Morelos, five employees of the federal womem's penitentiary in Puente de Ixtla are gunned down on their way to work. Three others are injured. The incident took place at a bus stop located in front of a statue built to honor mothers.
  - Mexican walker Lupita González has been suspended for four years due to allegations of using the steroid Trenbolone. She is disqualified from the 2020 Summer Olympics, among other events. González plans to appeal.
- May 11:
  - 45 bodies have been found in clandestine graves. 30 bodies were found in Sonora and 15 in Guadalajara, Jalisco.
  - Death sentences for three Mexicans convicted of drug trafficking in Malaysia are commuted.
  - The owner of Colegio Rébsamen, Mónica García Villegas, has been arrested and charged with murder in relation to the deaths of 19 students and 7 adults in the September 19, 2017 earthquake.
- May 12: Eleven people, including an 8-year-old boy, are killed in a shooting in Chilapa de Álvarez, Guerrero, near Chilpancingo. Also two bodies of men who were apparently tortured were found in Tlaxmalac, Huitzuco, a taxi driver was murdered in Taxco, another man was killed in El Pochote, Teloloapan, and five were killed in Acapulco.
- May 14: Mexico City mayor Claudia Sheinbaum announces that 2019 will be the last year that the Mexican Grand Prix will be held because the MXN $400 million (US$20.865 million) fee will be diverted to the Tren Maya. It is estimated that the race generates MXN $8,400 million for Mexico.
- May 15 Teachers' Day
  - The educational reform is enacted.
  - For the first time in its 85-year history, the Palacio de Bellas Artes has been used for religious purposes. The opera El guardián del espejo (Guard of the mirror) in honor of Evangelist Naasón Joaquín García was shown at the theater. Authorities are looking into a lawsuit. On May 22, Alejandra Frausto Guerrero, Secretary of Culture, stated that the event was a concert, not a religious event.
  - Mexican wines win 39 medals, including two grand gold and two gold, at the Concours Mondial de Bruxelles held in Aigle, Switzerland. This puts Mexico in the top 10 best wine-making countries in the world.
- May 16:
  - "Festival Marvin" music festival begins in Mexico City.
  - 71 forest fires in 18 states have been registered. Classes in preschools, elementary schools, middle schools, high schools, and universities in the Valley of Mexico and other places have been canceled. Another report puts the number of fires at 109 in 19 states, but some have been extinguished.
  - María Espinoza wins third place in the Taekwondo world championships.
- May 17: The United States Department of the Treasury has declared former Nayarit governor Roberto Sandoval Castañeda and judge Isidro Avelar Gutiérrez "significant drug dealers". Six other individuals and six corporations were similarly sanctioned. The following day, the CJF (Council of the Federal Judiciary) suspended Judge Avelar Gutiérrez.
- May 18:
  - "Pulso GNP" music festival in Querétaro.
  - The United States removes its tariff on Mexican steel.
- May 19:
  - The Instituto Nacional Electoral has banned a video by PAN in the special election in Puebla.
  - The Mexico national beach football team wins the 2019 CONCACAF Beach Soccer Championship in Puerto Vallarta.
- May 20: President Lopez Obrador signs a decree eliminating a special tax break for over 100 of Mexico's largest companies. He says that in the last twelve years, large corporations got away without paying MXN $400 billion in taxes. A few days earlier, Servicio de Administración Tributaria (Mexican revenue service) announced that they will start to withhold taxes on drivers for Uber, DiDi, Cabify, and similar ride services.
- May 21: Mexican dancer Elisa Carrillo Cabrera wins the 2019 Benois Award as the best dancer in the world from the International Dance Association in Moscow.
- May 22:
  - President Andrés Manuel López Obrador named Zoe Robledo Aburto director of the Mexican Social Security Institute on May 22, 2019 after the resignation of Germán Martínez Cázares. Martínez Cázares resigned in protest of the lack of resources for the institution. On May 22, Germán Martínez requested to be reinstated in the Senate.
  - The Instituto Mexicano del Seguro Social sues former Sonora governor Eduardo Bours for negligence in the investigation of the 2009 Hermosillo daycare center fire that killed 44 toddlers.
  - The Mexican National Guard officially takes over police functions in the eight most violent states: Guanajuato, Michoacan, Jalisco, State of Mexico, Mexico City, Veracruz, Guerrero, and Morelos.
- May 23: Students' Day (Thursday)
- May 25: Josefa González Blanco Ortiz Mena, the head of the Secretariat of Environment and Natural Resources resigned after it was revealed that she abused her power by ordering a civilian flight delayed.
- May 26
  - Seven socially-prominent Mexicans, including Emilio Salinas Occelli (son of former president Carlos Salinas de Gortari) and Ana Cristina Fox (daughter of former president Vicente Fox, Rosa Laura Junco, Loreta Garza Dávila (business leader from Nuevo Leon, Daniela Padilla, Camila Fernández, and Mónica Durán, have been accused of involvement with a sex slave ring known as NXIVM.
  - Three police officers are killed and 10 people injured in a shoot-out in Zamora Municipality, Michoacán. Also, nine soldiers were detained and disarmed by self-defense forces in La Huacana Municipality. They were released the same day.
  - The Tigres win the national soccer championship, the Liga MX.
- May 27: Pureblood "Kublaigo", ridden by Miguel Ángel Rodríguez, wins the 74th Hándicap de las Américas horse race in Mexico City.
- May 28: Alonso Ancira, the owner and president of Altos Hornos de México (Mexico's largest steel mill), was arrested in connection with the 2014 sale of a fertilizer plant to PEMEX, the Mexican-state oil company. The bank accounts of Altos Hornos and Emilio Lozoya Austin, the former CEO of PEMEX, were frozen 24 hours earlier. It is believed that Lozoya will soon be arrested.
- May 29
  - A bomb explodes in the office of Senator Citlalli Hernández of Morena, burning her face.
  - Pharmaceutical companies of India and Spain are the first countries to offer the sale of low-priced medicine in Mexico.
- May 30: U.S. President Donald Trump declares he will impose a 5% tariff on all Mexican goods imported by the United States starting June 10, 2019. The tax will increase by another 5% every month until undocumented immigrants stop crossing the border.

=== June ===
- June 1: National Maritime Day
  - Underdog Mexican heavyweight boxer Andy Ruiz Jr. defeats Anthony Joshua for the heavyweight championship.
  - Filmmaker Ángeles Cruz of Mixtalco, Oaxaca wins a prize for "Best Short Fiction Film" at the Ismailia International Film Festival in Egypt. Cruz's film, Arcángel is about an elderly indigenous woman.
- June 2: Local elections. No mjor reports of violence were reported, and turnout was slightly over 30% of eligible voters.
  - Aguascalientes – PAN wins five municipalities, PVEM wins two, PRI, PRD, PT, and Morena win one each.
  - Baja California – Jaime Bonilla of Morena elected governor.
  - Durango – PAN wins two municiappilies, but the PAN-PRD coalition takes sixteen. PRI wins 16, and Morena wins 2.
  - Puebla – Miguel Barbosa of Morena elected governor.
  - Quintana Roo –PRI wins one municipality, PRD-PAN coalition wins two.
  - Tamaulipas – PAN wins almost the entire territory; 21 electoral districts vs. one for Morena.
- June 2:
  - During the "5th March for Peace", Cuernavaca Bishop Ramón Castro Castro declares that 18 of 36 municipal governments in the state of Morelos are controlled by drug dealers. Governor Cuauhtémoc Blanco, who as mayor had led the marches, was notably absent.
  - The 2019 Nor.Ca. Women's Handball Championship in Mexico City is won by Cuba women's national handball team.
- June 3: The government of Mexico City announces its Plan de Reduccíon de Emisisiones del Sector Movilidad ("Plan for Reduction of Emissions in Transportation") with the intent of reducing vehicular-caused pollution by 2024. The plan includes severe restrictions on private and commercial transportation and encourages the use of mass transit and non-polluting transportation.
- June 4:
  - Five people have been killed and one woman is missing after flooding in San Gabriel, Jalisco.
  - Cadets at Universidad Policial de Guerrero accuse the training director, Néstor Cruz Rosalino, of sexual abuse. They claim that he makes them strip in front of him in order to see who has "the best female anatomy," and then he leaves with the one he likes best.
  - California Attorney General Xavier Becerra announces that Naasón Joaquín García, leader of the La Luz del Mundo church based in Guadalajara, and four other people, have been arrested in connection with alleged sex trafficking, child abuse, and production of child pornography.
  - For the first time, an all-female crew will fly a Navy plane, the Secretariat of the Navy announces. It is a Beechcraft Super King Air air ambulance.
- June 5: Six political prisoners, members of the environmental group Defensores de la Tierra, (English: "Defenders of the Land") in Salazar, Lerma, State of Mexico, have been liberated. They were arrested after the police and army helped people from nearby Tarasquillo seized and sold their land to private parties.
- June 6: BMW opens a U.S.$1 billion (MXN $20 billion) auto plant in San Luis Potosi. It will employ 2,000 workers and have a capacity to produce 175,000 cars in the Mexican, Latin American, and U.S. markets.
- June 7: Mexico's Interior Secretary, Olga Sánchez Cordero, announces that Mexico will send 6,000 members of the National Guard to the border with Guatemala in response to U.S. President Donald Trump's threat to impose tariffs on all Mexican goods unless immigration is lessened. Later the same day, Trump announced that an agreement had been reached, and the tariffs will be suspended.
- June 12:
  - The Carlos Slim Foundation announces that it will work with the Bill & Melinda Gates Foundation and the Inter-American Development Bank to end malaria in Central America, Colombia, and the Dominican Republic.
  - A judge orders the suspension of construction of the airport in Santa Lucia until environmental and cultural studies have been completed. Three days later President Andrés Manuel López Obrador threatens to publicly expose the parties who are trying to stop the development of the country.
- June 13: Luxury fashion house Carolina Herrera is accused of cultural appropriation by Mexico's culture secretary, Alejandra Frausto Guerrero.
- June 14:
  - Two men and two women (one pregnant) are shot and wounded inside a police vehicle when it is attacked in Benito Juárez Municipality, Quintana Roo. A young man on a motorcycle was also wounded.
  - A member of the Agencia Estatal de Investigaciones (English: "State Investigation Agency") in charge of fighting kidnappings was herself kidnapped on Friday in General Treviño, Nuevo Leon. Another agent was shot and killed.
- June 15: Four people died and at least 12 were injured when a gas tank exploded in Tepatitlán, Jalisco.
- June 16: Father's Day
  - Verano de Escándalo (2019) professional wrestling event in Mérida, Yucatán.
- June 17: An explosion on the volcano Popocatépetl shoots 8 km (5 miles) into the air. This was the second such explosion in 24 hours.
- June 18: Twelve Federal Police agents are sentenced to 34 years of prison for the August 24, 2012 murder of two CIA agents in Tres Marias, Morelos.
- June 19: The government of Catalonia apologizes for the Conquest of Mexico.
- June 20: Mexico ratifies the United States–Mexico–Canada Agreement. It has not been ratified by the U.S. Congress or by Canada yet.
- June 21:
  - Mexico announces US$30 million for El Salvador as part of its migration plan.
  - The Congress of Morelos passes a law to prohibit the use of styrofoam and/or plastic containers.
  - Final of 2019 Men's Pan-American Volleyball Cup in Colima City. Won by Cuba men's national volleyball team.
- June 24:
  - Mexican Secretary of Defense Luis Cresencio Sandoval announces the deployment of 15,000 troops along the Mexico-U.S. border.
  - Sargassum threatens the coasts of Tulum and Xcalak.
- June 26: Over 100 Central American migrants are rescued by police in Los Mangos and in Tantoyuca.
- June 30: Opposition forces march in Mexico City and other parts of the country. One report describes the crowds as "hundreds".

=== July ===
- July 1:
  - Up to one meter (39") of hail falls in Guadalajara, Jalisco.
  - Four vehicles are burned on the Villahermosa-Teapa (Tabasco) highway as a protest against the Mexican National Guard.
- July 2: Two dozen people are kidnapped from a home in Cancun, Quintana Roo. They were rescued the following day, all in good health.
- July 3: Shelters for migrants in Nuevo Laredo, Tamaulipas, are reported full, and many Central American and Cuban refugees are forced to sleep in the streets.
- July 4:
  - Thousands of federal police protest against their inclusion in the National Guard.
  - UNESCO declares that the World Habitat for the vaquita marina is in danger.
- July 5:
  - For the second time, a judge orders the detention of Emilio Lozoya Austin, former director of Pemex, in relation to the Odebrecht scandal. His whereabouts are unknown. Two days earlier, on July 3, Lozoya had asked for witness protection in the case involving illegal purchase of a fertilizer plant.
  - Mexican authorities announce they have broken up an international human-trafficking ring.
  - Secretary of Tourism, Miguel Torruco Marqués announces that the Sargassum that plagues Caribbean beaches is a national priority. Hotels in the Riviera Maya are offering guests discounts of up to 25% in order to maintain an 80% occupancy rate.
  - President Andrés Manuel López Obrador proposes that rural doctors and nurses be paid more than their urban counterparts, emulating Canada, the UK, Sweden, Denmark, and Norway.
- July 5–7: The 10th NACAC Under-23 Championships in Athletics are held in Querétaro.
- July 6–7: The Mexico national rugby sevens team takes 3rd place at the 2019 RAN Sevens rugby tournament in George Town, Cayman Islands. The Mexico women's national rugby sevens team won 1st place in its event.
- July 7: The Mexican national soccer team wins its eighth CONCACAF Gold Cup with a 1–0 victory over the United States in Chicago's Soldier Field.
- July 10:
  - The National Supreme Court of Justice rules that members of the Federal Economic Competition Commission and of the National Human Rights Commission (CNDH) can receive salaries higher than the president's. This is a temporary measure until the entire court can decide the case.
  - The last Volkswagen Beetle rolls off the line in Puebla (city). The last of 5,961 "Special Edition" cars will be exhibited in a museum.
- July 11:
  - Seven members of a family in Puebla are killed in a mudslide.
  - Juan Collado, the personal lawyer of former president Enrique Peña Nieto, is arrested on charges of money laundering and organized crime.
- July 12:
  - 2019 FIVB Volleyball Women's U20 World Championship begins in Mexico City.
  - "Surf Open 2019" begins in Acapulco.
  - 50 state agents in Chihuahua rescue 21 kidnap victims who were forced to work in drug cultivation and sleep in a cave at night.
- July 14: The burned body of an unknown 12-year-old girl is found in Atizapán de Zaragoza, State of Mexico, an apparent victim of femicide. This is the same day that the body of Lupita Hernández Pérez, 29, missing since June 30 and an apparent victim of femicide, is found in Iztapalapa.
- July 15: Three former employees of Mexico City's Secretaría de Administración y Finanzas (Secretary of Administration and Finance) office are arrested for transferring over MXN $190 million (US$9.9 million) to a private bank account.
- July 17:
  - Joaquín "El Chapo" Guzmán, former head of the Sinaloa cartel, which became the biggest supplier of drugs to the U.S., is sentenced to life in prison plus 30 years. President Lopez Obrador insists that the money seized in fines legally belongs to Mexico.
  - The National Action Party announces that it plans to expel the seven deputies in Baja California who voted to extend the governor's term from two to five years.
  - The Secretariat of Environment and Natural Resources (SEMARNAT) approves construction of a terminal at the new airport site in Santa Lucía.
- July 18:
  - The Federal Telecommunications Institute announces that starting August 3, there will be a simplified way to call both landline and mobile phones across the country.
  - 400 environmental groups insist that the government prosecute the mining company Grupo México for a recent sulphuric acid spill in the Sea of Cortés. The Congress of the Union also demands that the Attorney General prosecute the company.
  - Bank accounts of 19 Mexican companies that have sold food to Venezuela have been frozen. Charges relate to low quality, high prices, and money laundering.
- July 20:
  - Newly unclassified documents real that President Felipe Calderón allowed the CIA to operate within Mexico.
  - Two followers of Santa Muerte (Our Lady of Holy Death) have been arrested for the feminicide of Cruz Yere Marín Rayón, 28, in Amozoc, Puebla.
- July 21: Four people are killed and six are injured in an attack on a bar in "La Condesa", Acapulco.
- July 24:
  - Two government officials and two pilots die in a helicopter crash in Michoacan.
  - General Sócrates Alfredo Herrera Pegueros, director of security for Pemex, is charged with aiding huachicoleros steal gasoline.
  - Authorities in Santa Cruz de las Huertas, Tonalá, Jalisco say 21 bodies have been found in a safe house. The investigation began on July 13.
  - Carlos Romero Deschamps, leader of leader of the oilworkers' union, is expelled from the union after being charged with corruption.
  - Two Israeli citizens are assassinated by the Israeli mafia in broad daylight in a shopping mall in Mexico City.
- July 26:
  - A Mexico City judge denies Emilio Lozoya, former leader of Pemex, access to his bank accounts.
  - The Secretariat of Energy announces the contracts for construction of an oil refinery in Dos Bocas, Paraiso, Tabasco.
- July 27: Paula Fregoso wins a gold medal in Taekwondo at the Pan American Games in Lima, Peru. Marco Arroyo won a bronze medal.
- July 29:
  - The Spanish newspaper El País reveals that Juan Collado, the personal lawyer of former president Enrique Peña Nieto, moved US$120 million (MXN $229 million) to 24 accounts in banks in Andorra. Collado used the money to acquire property in Acapulco and Miami in addition to two large airplanes.
  - Mexican cyclists José Ulloa and Daniela Campuzano win gold medals in men's and women's mountain biking at the 2019 Pan American Games in Lima, Peru.
- July 31:
  - The Canadian government denies that its embassy in Mexico had anything to do with the coverup of the 2009 murder of activist Mariano Abarca, reportedly at the hands of the Blackfire Exploration, a Canadian mining company in Chicomuselo, Chiapas.
  - The Tax Administration Service (SAT) reveals a list of 300 individuals who have not paid their taxes, including former president Vicente Fox, who owes MXN$15,000,000. The largest debt is owed by Fausto Luis Muñiz Patiño of Grupo Pae, who owes MXN$119,000,000 of the total MXN$17,044,000,000.

=== August ===
- August 1: 280 cases of dengue fever have been confirmed in Oaxaca after the death of a 5-year-old boy. Fifteen cases are considered grave (serious).
- August 2: The government of Mexico will provide Internet access throughout the country through the establishment of a subsidiary of the Comisión Federal de Electricidad called CFE Telecomunicaciones e Internet para Todos (CFE Telecommunications and Internet for All).
- August 3:
  - Starting today, dialing a telephone requires ten digits; prefixes 01, 044, and 045 are obsolete, according to the Federal Telecommunications Institute.
  - Seven Mexican citizens are among the 23 dead in a mass shooting in El Paso, Texas, apparently inspired by anti-immigrant hate.
- August 6: 1,500 gold centenario coins worth US$2.5 million (MXN$55 million) are stolen from the Mexican Mint.
- August 7: The National Supreme Court of Justice rules that rape victims have the right to receive abortions in public hospitals. Girls younger than 12 need parental permission.
- August 8:
  - Seven supposed kidnappers are lynched in Cohuecán, Puebla.
  - After three years, a group of mothers of missing persons known as Colectivo Solecito calls off the search for bodies in Veracruz, in the largest clandestine cemetery in Latin America. Since 2016, they have found 298 skulls and 22,000 human remains.
  - Twenty bodies have been found in Uruapan, Michoacan—some dismembered, some in bags, others hanging from bridges. Fourteen people, including two minors, are arrested two days later.
  - Mexican athletes have won 27 gold, 24 silver, and 44 bronze, a total of 95 medals, at the 2019 Pan American Games in Lima, Peru.
- August 9: Rosario Robles, former Secretary of Agrarian, Land, and Urban Development is arrested and charged with stealing MXN$5,000 million (US$250,000,000). She faces seven years of prison.
- August 11: Alejandro Moreno Cárdenas declares victory in the election for leader of PRI.
- August 12: A public passenger van was burned by extortionists along the San Juan Zitlaltpec route in the State of Mexico. This was the 21st such attack along the same route.
- August 14: Bosque de Chapultepec wins the "International Large Urban Parks Award 2019" from the "World Urban Parks Association."
- August 15:
  - 544 athletes and 168 coaches who participated in the 2019 Pan American Games are awarded economic stimuli of MXN $240,000 (US$12,234) each by President Andrés Manuel López Obrador.
  - The Bank of Mexico lowers interest rates for the first time in five years, from 8.25% to 8.0%.
- August 16:
  - Mexican-Argentine businessman Carlos Ahumada, wanted by the Attorney General of Mexico, is arrested in Argentina.
  - A women's march against violence and police corruption in Mexico City breaks out in violence.
- August 18
  - A group calling itself #FueraJuecesCorruptos has convoked a march against corrupt judges on August 18. Hundreds of people march.
  - Judith Abigail Jiménez Pulido, 28, missing since August 9, becomes the 54th victim of femicide in Puebla in 2019.
- August 19: 194 exhalations, 428 minutes of quaking, 3 minor explosions, and 3 earthquakes are reported in the last 24 hours in Popocatépetl. The alert level remains at Yellow, Phase 2.
- August 21: Six federal police officers have been charged with murder for their supposed involvement in a police operation that left nine dead in January 2015 in Apatzingán, Michoacan.
- August 22: Rain associated with Tropical Storm Ivo causes flooding in Mazatlan, Sinaloa.
- August 23: The Lagunas de Montebello in Chiapas are drying due to drought.
- August 28: 30 people die in an arson attack on a bar in Coatzacoalcos, Vercruz.
- August 30: A pitched battle between Jalisco New Generation Cartel led by "El Mencho" and Michoacan self defense forces led by "El Abuelo" leave 9 dead and 11 injured in Tepalcatepec Municipality, Michoacan.
- August 31: Luis Armando Reynoso Femat, former Governor of Aguascalientes (PAN) has been sentenced to prison for the crimes of peculation and misuse of public exercise.

=== September ===
- September 1: President López Obrador gives his Primer Informe del Gobierno (State of the Union address) before 400 legislators, governors, and business leaders, emphasizing his efforts to end corruption and help the poor.
- September 2
  - Five are killed at a shoot-out in a Cuernavaca, Morelos, bus station.
  - Óscar René González Galindo, former mayor of Motozintla, Chiapas, (PVEM 2012-2015) is arrested for peculation.
  - Gildardo Lópéz Astudillo "El Gil", who is suspected of involvement in the 2014 Ayotzinapa, Guerrero kidnapping and probable murder of 43 students, has been released after a judge rules the evidence against him was based on torture and intimidation.
  - David Huerta wins the Literary Award in Romance Languages 2019 at the Feria Internacional del Libro in Guadalajara.
- September 4: Considerable flooding and at least one dead in northwest Mexico (Nuevo Leon, Tamaulipas) are the toll of Tropical Storm Fernand.
- September 5
  - Alejandro Jacobo and Josué Reyes are given 55 years of prison for the femicide of "Reyna" in Zacatepec, Morelos in May 2018.
  - Laura Angélica Rojas Hernández of (PAN) is elected President of the Chamber of Deputies.
- September 7: 70 members of a criminal band are arrested in La Unión, Guerrero
- September 8: 3 killed and 2 missing in Tlajomulco de Zúñiga, Jalisco due to flooding of La Culebra.
- September 11: TheComité de Derechos Humanos (Human Rights Committee) in Nuevo Laredo, Tamaulipas, says that state police killed eight civilians on September 5 and falsely claimed they were members of the Cártel del Noreste drug gang.
- September 13: Day of the Niños Héroes, 1847
  - Accounts of the Universidad Popular de la Chontalpa are frozen in relation to the Estafa Maestra.
  - Three underage (14 and 17 years old) hitmen are killed by municipal police while in the process of murdering 19-year-old Julián Adán Rodríguez in San Luis Río Colorado Municipality, Sonora.
- September 14: es:Día Nacional del Locutor (National Announcer's Day)
- September 15
  - President Andrés Manuel López Obrador leads the 209th Grito de la Independencia from the National Palace in the Zócalo of Mexico City. He cried ¡Viva! twenty times.
  - One person dies and at least 16 are injured due to a fireworks accident in Xalapa, Veracruz.
- September 16: Independence Day (Monday)
  - Parachutist injured during the Independence Day parade in Mexico City.
  - A group of armed men burn a bus used for public transportation in Acapulco, Guerrero.
- September 18: French auction house Millon auctions off 120 pieces of Pre-Columbian Mexican art in Paris, over the protests of Ambassador Juan Manuel Gómez Robledo. The art is believed to be stolen or counterfeit.
- September 20: Hundreds of young people in Mexico City join their counterparts across the world in demonstrations against climate change.
- September 21: Día Nacional de Lucha Libre (National Day of Freestyle Wrestling)
  - Pedro Salmerón Sanginés resigns as director general of the National Institute of Historical Studies on the Mexican Revolution; INEHRM, a post he had held since 2013. He cited right-wing opposition and has been replaced by Felipe Arturo Ávila Espinosa.
  - President Andres Manuel Lopez Obrador announces that the anti-cancer medicine bought from France has arrived in the country.
- September 22: Following Tropical Storm Lorena, theCoordinación Nacional de Protección Civil declares a state of emergency in La Paz and Los Cabos, Baja California Sur. The storm also caused flooding in Guerrero, Michoacan, Colima, and Jalisco.
- September 23: On behalf of the government of Mexico, President Lopez Obardor apologizes to Martha Camacho Loaiza, leader of the communist guerrilla group Liga Comunista 23 de septiembre, who was tortured in 1977.
- September 25: Oaxaca decriminalizes abortion.
- September 26:
  - Former attorney general of Nayarit Edgar Veytia is condemned to twenty years of prison in the United States for drug dealing.
  - A group of soldiers are ambushed in Leonardo Bravo, Guerrero; three soldiers killed.
  - On the fifth anniversary of the 2014 Iguala mass kidnapping, the government reopens the investigation, calling former Attorney General Jesús Murillo Karam to testify and offering a MXN $10,000,000 (US$500,000) reward for the capture of Alejandro Tenescalco Mejía, one of the principal suspects.
  - A group of masked protesters break windows and burn a bookstore in Mexico City on the fifth anniversary of the 2014 Iguala mass kidnapping. President Lopez Obrador clarifies that the vandals are not left-wing anarchists but right-wing conservatives.
- September 27: Culmination of the Mexican War of Independence, 1821
  - Mswati lll, king of Swaziland, in Southern Africa, arrives at Los Cabos, Baja California Sur, with his 14 wives and a contingent of 70.
- September 28:
  - Two killed and two others are injured in an accident on the Quimera roller coaster in the La Feria Chapultepec Mágico, Mexico City.
  - Pope Francis announces the creation of three new dioceses: Azcapotzalco, Iztapalapa, and Xochimilco.
- September 28 and September 29: 1st wine festival in Querétaro.
- September 29: Tropical Storm Narda brings heavy rains, flooding, school closings, and at least one death, to Oaxaca, Michoacan, Guerrero, Nayarit, Jalisco, and Colima.
- September 30: Birthday of José María Morelos, (b. 1765)

=== October ===
- October: María Lorena Ramírez, Rarámuri ultra-marathon runner and native of the Sierra Tarahumara in Chihuahua is featured on the cover of Vogue Mexico.
- October – November: The San Sebastián International Film Festival in northern Spain will honor Mexican director Roberto Gavaldón, whose 1960 movie Macario was the first Mexican film to win an Academy Award.
- October 1
  - Arturo González Cruz of MORENA is sworn in as the new municipal president of Tijuana, Baja California.
  - General Motors temporarily lays off 6,000 workers in Silao, Guanajuato due to strike in the United States.
- October 3
  - Justice Eduardo Medina-Mora Icaza resigns from the National Supreme Court of Justice (SCJN) after it is revealed that his banks accounts are being investigated by the National Crime Agency in the UK and the United States Department of the Treasury.
  - Flecha Roja bus line announces the suspension of services along the Mexico City-Santiago Tianguistenco, State of Mexico, route, following the hijacking of their buses by students at the Escuela Normal Rural Lázaro Cárdenas de San José Tenería. Four other routes are also affected.
  - Jesús Orta resigns his position as Secretaría de Seguridad Ciudadana (Secretary of Public Security) and is replaced by Omar García Harfuch, chief of the investigative division. Proceso magazine notes that García Harfuch has been investigated by the U.S. government and linked to both the Ayotzinapa kidnapping case and the Guerreros Unidos drug cartel.
- October 4
  - Actress Yalitza Aparicio is named UNESCO Goodwill Ambassador for Indigenous peoples.
  - Three more individuals implicated in the Ayotzinapa kidnapping case are freed. Judge Ventura Ramos has freed 29 prisoners implicated in the case in the past month.
  - Las Comisiones Unidas de Procuración y Administración de Justicia y de Igualdad de Género (The United Commissions for the Procuration and Administration of Justice and Gender Equality) in Puebla vote against decriminalization of abortion and legalization of same-sex marriage. The penalty for abortion is reduced from five to one year.
  - Organizers of the Premio Batuta de México (Baton Prize of Mexico) withdraw Placido Domingo's name just two days prior to giving him the prize due to charges of sexual harassment.
- October 7: Mérida, Yucatán is chosen by Readers’ Choice Awards as the "best small city in the world."
- October 8: 10,000 taxi drivers block traffic for twelve hours in a protest against Uber and Cabify in Mexico City.
- October 10: Nadine Gasman, head of the Instituto Nacional de las Mujeres (Inmujeres) reports that 267 women and girls are victims of violence every day in Mexico.
- October 11–20: XIX International Book Fair in the Zocolo of Mexico City.
- October 11
  - The Attorney General of Mexico arrests three members of a sex-trafficking ring in Tenancingo Municipality, Tlaxcala.
  - At least nine people are killed and eight injured as a train and bus crash in San Juan del Río, Querétaro.
  - President Lopez Obrador says that a magistrate from the 1st circuit of the Supreme Court (SCJN) is being investigated because of an MXN $80 million bank deposit. Milenio reports it is Judge Jorge Arturo Camero Ocampo.
- October 12: Dia de la Raza
- October 13
  - Popocatépetl volcano has produced one explosion, 117 exhalations, and 709 minutes (almost 12 hours) of quaking in a 24-hour period. Gas and light ash have been seen, and the area remains in "Amarillo Fase 2" alert.
  - Voters in Baja California express their opinions on whether to extend Governor Jaime Bonilla's term from two to five years. According to a poll, 84.25% (53,419 voters) approve the five-year term.
  - 800 people organized by the Canadian group "Choir!Choir!Choir!" sing With a Little Help from My Friends and other songs by The Beatles on the border near Tijuana as a protest against U.S. immigration policy.
- October 14: At least 14 police officers are ambushed and murdered by 30 armed members of the Jalisco New Generation Cartel in Aguililla, Michoacan.
- October 15
  - Andorra seizes US$83.1 million belonging to Juan Ramón Collado, lawyer of former President Enrique Peña Nieto. Collado was arrested for money laundering on July 9.
  - Fourteen armed civilians and one soldier are killed in a battle in Tepochica, Guerrero.
- October 16
  - Nine executions attributed to the Cártel del Noroeste have been reported in Tamaulipas in 24-hours.
  - Carlos Romero Deschamps, leader of the Sindicato de Trabajadores Petroleros de la República Mexicana (PEMEX employees' union) has resigned after being accused of illegal enrichment.
- October 17
  - The arrest of Ovidio Guzmán López, son of Joaquín "El Chapo" Guzmán, sets off several gun battles in Culiacán, Sinaloa. Hours later he is freed, and President Lopez Obrador says he supports the decision in order to prevent more bloodshed.
  - Construction of the new "General Felipe Ángeles" airport in Zumpango, State of Mexico, begins; the airport is scheduled to open on March 21, 2022. It is expected to cost MXN $75 billion (US$3.9 billion).
- October 19 — October 20: Harry Potter festival in Mexico City.
- October 20
  - Eduardo Arturo Bailleres Mendoza is relieved as warden of the penitentiary in Culiacán after 49 prisoners escaped on October 17. He had been in charge for 11 months.
  - Five Mexican chefs are awarded Michelin Stars: Indra Carrillo, "La Condessa" in Paris; Paco Mendez, "Hoja Santa" in Barcelona; Cosme Aguilar, "Casa de Enrique" in New York; Roberto Ruiz, "Punto MX" in Madrid; and Carlos Gaytan, "Ha" in Xcaret.
- October 22
  - Activists on social media call for a boycott of Kimberly-Clark de México paper products after CEO Claudio González X. Laporte reports the company will no longer invest in Mexico.
  - A group of mayors who belong to opposition parties (PAN, PRI, and PRD) was repelled with tear gas when they tried to force their way into the National Palace for a meeting with President Lopez Obrador.
  - Rosario Ibarra de Piedra is awarded the Belisario Domínguez Medal of Honor, only to give it to President Lopez Obardor until the disappearances of "our loved ones" are resolved.
  - Twenty-one mayors from Chiapas resign from PRI, PVEM, PRD, and local political parties to join Morena.
- October 25
  - Fires in Baja California kill four, damage 200 homes, and burn 7,600 hectares (18,800 acres) of grassland.
  - 100,000 pay homage to the late José José during a rainstorm in the Zócalo of Mexico City.
- October 26
  - 6,000 General Motors auto workers temporarily laid off in Silao, Guanajuato and Ramos Arizpe, Coahuila, due to a strike in the United States, go back to work.
  - Police find 42 skulls and other bones in a narco-tunnel in Tepito, Colonia Morelos, Cuauhtémoc, Mexico City. Police also are revising the charges against 27 people who were arrested but then released by a judge on October 22.
- October 27 – Daylight saving time ends; turn clocks back one hour.
  - 328 minutes (5.4 hours) of quaking and 231 exhalations are reported in the Popocatépetl volcano over the past 24 hours.
  - Lewis Hamilton wins the Grand Prix of Mexico.
- October 28 – Karime Macías Tubilla, wife of former governor of Veracruz Javier Duarte, is detained in London.
- October 29 – A children's party in Iztatapala is shot up, resulting in two adults killed and eight children injured.
- October 30 – A riot at Atlacholoaya penitentiary in Xochitepec, Morelos, leaves six dead, including "El Ray", a leader of the Jalisco New Generation Cartel; 15 are injured.
- October 31
  - Two children are shot while trick-or-treating in Guadalajara, Jalisco. Three young children and their adult accomanant are shot to death while Trick-or-treating in Ecatepec de Morelos, State of Mexico.
  - Police free a toll booth from 30 people who were charging drivers MXN $200-$500 in Huimanguillo, Tabasco. One killed and nine arrested.
  - An international human trafficking ring is taken down and 387 migrants are freed.

=== November ===
- November 1
  - The Bank of Mexico reports that transfer payments from Mexicans living overseas increased by 13.3% in September 2019 compared to September 2018, and by 9.3% in total for the first nine months of the year. This represents US$26.98 billion (MXN $515.6 billion).
- November 2: Day of the Dead (Saturday)
  - Thousands participate in Acatrina Fest 2019 parade in Acapulco, Guerrero.
- November 2–7: The Estadio de Béisbol Charros de Jalisco y Atletismo in Zapopan hosts the 2019 WBSC Premier12 baseball championship.
- November 3
  - Hundreds of people, mostly women, march in Mexico City against femicide.
  - At least five people are killed in a shooting in a tianguis de autos (bazaar of used cars) in Uruapan, Michoacan.
- November 4 – A woman and her four minor children, members of the LeBaron order, are burned alive while driving to Nuevo Casas Grandes, Chihuahua.
- November 5
  - After the death toll in the attack on the LeBaron family along the border of Sonora and Chihuahua, U.S. President Donald Trump offers to send troops to Mexico to fight a war against drug cartels. President Lopez Obrador turns him down, saying Mexico will act para hacer justicia ("to do justice"). Five children injured in the attack are sent to a hospital in the United States.
  - The bank debt acquired by President Ernesto Zedillo in 1994 reaches MXN $97,500,000 pesos per day, reaching US$1,032,236,000, according to Fobaproa ("Banking Fund for the Protection of Savings"). This represents a 1.25% increase in real terms over the last nine months, not counting inflation.
  - A police officer in Culiacan, Sinaloa, is killed after being shot 155 times.
- November 6
  - Three Mexican tourists are stabbed while visiting an archaeological site in Jordan; one is in serious condition.
  - The Congress of the Union approves reforms to the Constitution in terms of revocation of mandate and popular consultation.
  - Emirates Airlines gets permission to begin Mexico City—Barcelona—Dubai flights on December 9.
  - The Instituto Nacional de Antropología e Historia announces the discovery of unique, 12,000 or 13,000-year-old traps for mammoths in Tultepec, State of Mexico.
  - In retaliation for police action inside a penitateniary, 10 people are killed and vehicles are burned by Los Mexicles street gang in Ciudad Juárez, Chihuahua. Another five vehicles are burned the next day.
- November 7
  - Gymnast Alexa Moreno wins the Premio Nacional de Deportes 2019 (National Sports Prize 2019) in the "non-professional" category for her achievements in the vault and for qualifying for the 2020 Olympics in Tokyo.
- November 8
  - Three police officers killed in Acapulco, Guerrero.
  - Five police killed and one wounded in San Vicente Coatlán, Oaxaca.
- November 9
  - An American teenager is arrested in Nogales, Sonora for gunrunning into Mexico.
  - 100 members of the LeBarón family leave their homes in northern Mexico.
- November 10
  - Reforma reports that Saul Monreal, mayor of Fresnillo, Zacatecas, spent US$70,000 (MXN $1.3 million) in public money to celebrate his daughter's 15th birthday. Monreal is the youngest brother of Ricardo Monreal Ávila, coordinator of National Regeneration Movement (Morena) in the Senate.
  - Hackers infiltrate the Pemex computer systems, demanding US$5 million in Bicoins.
- November 11
  - Evo Morales, former president of Bolivia, accepts asylum in Mexico.
  - The World Health Organization declares Mexico the first country in the world to be free from dog-transmitted rabies. The disease is still transmitted by wild animals.
  - Armed members of Los Dumbos cartel burn two cars and block the Chilpancingo-Acapulco highway near Xaltianguis, Guerrero.
  - The Communist Party of Mexico issues a declaration on its 100th anniversary.
  - Members of the National Action Party insist that Rosario Piedra Ibarra should not be allowed to take the oath as president of the National Human Rights Commission (CNDH) due to voting irregularities in the Senate. A video of Senator Xóchitl Gálvez using violence on November 13 to prevent Ibarra's swearing in circulates on social media.
- November 12 – Rosario Piedra Ibarra is sworn in as president of the National Human Rights Commission (CNDH). Alberto Manuel Athie Gallo, another member of the National Human Rights Commission, resigns in protest.
- November 14
  - Seven killed, including one soldier, and three injured in shootout between the Mexican Army and the Cartel del Noreste in Nuevo Laredo, Tamaulipas.
  - A shootout at a carlot in Cuernavaca, Morelos, leaves three dead and one wounded.
  - Maribel Cervantes Guerrero, head of the state police in the State of Mexico, reports that several regional police commanders have pacted with organized crime leaders, allowing them to freedom to commit crimes.
  - José Carlos Ramos Ramos, the new police chief of Celaya, Guanajuato, is attacked by armed men; one bodyguard killed and two injured.
  - Alejandro Vera, former rector of the Autonomous University of the State of Morelos, UAEM, and his wife, María Elena Ávila, are kidnapped in Morelos. They are rescued two days later.
- November 16 – Sanctuaries for Monarch butterflies open in State of Mexico and Michoacan.
- November 17
  - The Mexico national under-17 football team places second to Brazil in a disputed game.
  - The Mexico national baseball team qualifies for the 2020 Summer Olympics in Tokyo by defeating the United States, 3–2.
- November 18 – Revolution Day (Mexico) (celebrated Monday).
- November 19
  - Former Governor of Baja California, Francisco Vega de Lamadrid, is accused of a MXN $1,200,000,000 (US$60 million) fraud and embezzlement involving 90 businesses and 40 "ghost companies." Governor Jaime Bonilla Valdez says former governors José Guadalupe Osuna Millán and Eugenio Elorduy Walther should also be investigated.
  - An earthquake with a 6.3 M_{W} with an epicenter 116 km northeast of Puerto Madero strikes Chiapas. Minor damages are reported.
- November 21 – Commandos attack the Hospital General de Salvatierra in Guanajuato, leaving a patient's dismembered body in a nearby community.
- November 23 – Mexican Navy Day
- November 25 – Thousands march in Mexico City in demand of elimination of violence against women. 200 women demonstrate in Ciudad Nezahualcóyotl, State of México.
- November 27 – The National Supreme Court of Justice (SCJN) rules that private schools cannot withhold grades or exams of students who have unpaid debts.
- November 29
  - Four police officers and seven armed civilians, members of the Cartel del Norte, are killed in a shootout in Villa Unión, Coahuila. Six other police officers are injured. The death toll reaches 21 on December 1.
  - Two judges who freed the ex-husband of Abril Perez, a woman who was murdered in Mexico City on November 25, have been suspended.

=== December ===
- December 1
  - The oversold Knotfest 2019 music festival in the Deportivo Oceanía Mexico City is canceled after violence breaks out after "Evanescense" fails to perform as scheduled. Unconfirmed deaths are reported.
  - Adrián LeBarón leads 1,000 marchers in Mexico City against President Andrés Manuel López Obrador and his policy of Abrazos, no balazos (hugs not bullets).
  - Before a crowd of 140,000 supporters, President Andrés Manuel López Obrador says he has fulfilled 89 of 100 campaign promises during a rally on the Zócalo of Mexico City.
  - The Mexican government announced that several suspects had been arrested for the LeBarón family massacre of November 4.
- December 4 – The Congress of Yucatan unanimously approves a measure requiring the teaching of the Maya language in schools in the state.
- December 5 – Margarita Ríos-Farjat is elected as a new justice of the Supreme Court (SCJN).
- December 8 – Foreign Secretary Marcelo Ebrard recalls Mexican Ambassador to Argentina Óscar Ricardo Valero Recio Becerra after Valero Recio is caught trying to steal an MXN $189 (US$10) book from a Buenos Aires bookstore.
- December 9 – Jorge Zapata, grandson of Emiliano Zapata, sues painter Fabián Cháirez, the Secretariat of Culture, and the Palacio de Bellas Artes over a 2014 painting that depicts the Revolutionary general as wearing a pink hat and high heels. The following day, four groups of peasants force their way into Bellas Artes and try to burn the painting. Members of the LGBQT community defend the painting.
- December 10 – Genaro García Luna, Secretary of Public Security (2006-2012) under President Felipe Calderon is arrested in Dallas, Texas, accused of accepting cocaine trafficking and receiving bribes of between US$3 million and $5 million from Joaquín "El Chapo" Guzmán.
- December 12: Our Lady of Guadalupe (Thursday) Five million pilgrims visit the basilica in Mexico City.
- December 13 – Cristina Pacheco, anchor for "Once Noticias," wins the Premio Nacional de Periodismo 2018 (National Journalism Award 2018).
- December 13 & 15: The Orlando Magic of the National Basketball Association will play regular-season games against the Chicago Bulls and the Utah Jazz at the Mexico City Arena in Mexico City
- December 15: Referendum on the Mayan Train in Chiapas, Tabasco, Campeche, Yucatán, and Quintana Roo. 92.3% (93,142) of the voters who participated voted "yes" and 7.4% (7,517) voted "no", with 268 of 269 voting districts reporting.
- December 16
  - Las Posadas begin (Monday)
  - Former President Felipe Calderón and his wife, Margarita Zavala manage to register their new political party, Mexico Libre ("Free Mexico").
  - The Comisión de Justicia (Justice Commission) of Morena demands the expulsion of Lilly Téllez from her position as a member of the party's Senate caucus.
- December 19 – Diverse narco-messages suggest a war between competing drug cartels in Querétaro.
- December 21 – The Legion of Christ accepts responsibility for 175 cases of child sexual abuse by 33 priests, including 60 minors who were abused by the organization's founder, Marcial Maciel.
- December 22 – National Action Party (PAN) demands an updated report on the 2018 Puebla helicopter crash that took the lives of Puebla Governor Martha Érika Alonso, her husband, and three others.
- December 23
  - Actors, producers, and painters demonstrate outside the National Palace demanding they be paid for their work. "We cannot live on applause!" they shout.
  - The Secretariat of Foreign Affairs calls on the government of Bolivia to respect the Vienna Convention on the Law of Treaties and to end its excessive vigilance of the Mexican Embassy in La Paz.
- December 25: Christmas Day (Wednesday)
  - Two are killed in an electrical fire at La Merced Market in Mexico City. This comes just three days after a similar fire destroyed the San Cosme market in Cuauhtémoc borough. In December 1988, 60 people were killed at La Merced in a fireworks disaster.
- December 26
  - A judge refuses to grant legal protection to Rosario Robles against impeachment.
  - According to Andrés García Aguayo, a researcher at the UNAM, 53% of the amphibians in Mexico are in danger of extinction.
  - At least 250 families are evacuated due to a gas leak in Tuxpan, Veracruz.
- December 27 – A 1,000-year-old Maya palace is discovered in Kulubá, Yucatan.
- December 28 – For the second time in just a year, a television series is recorded in a protected area of Xochimilco, Mexico City.
- December 29 – Rayados of Monterrey wins their fifth national soccer championship in the Liga MX.
- December 30 – The lime extracting company "Cales y Morteros del Grijalva, SA de CV." is closed for damaging the environment over a period of 50 years in the Sumidero Canyon in Chiapa de Corzo, Chiapas.
- December 31
  - At least five vehicles were burned in Villahermosa, Tabasco, in demand of the release of Trinidad Alberto de la Cruz Miranda, (“El Pelón de Playas del Rosario”) and four other members of his drug cartel.
  - A riot in the prison in Cieneguillas, Zacatecas leaves 16 dead and five injured.

== Awards ==
- Belisario Domínguez Medal of Honor – María Rosario Ibarra de la Garza
- Order of the Aztec Eagle
- Premio Internacional Carlos Fuentes a la Creación Literaria – Luisa Valenzuela
- National Prize for Arts and Sciences
  - Linguistics and literature – Concepción Company
  - Popular Arts and Traditions – Carmen Vázquez Hernández
  - Fine arts – Abraham Oceransky
  - History, Social Sciences, and Philosophy – Diego Valadés
- National Public Administration Prize
- Ohtli Award
  - Claudia Adeath Villamil (CkulturA)
  - Pedro César Peralta
  - Rafael Cao Romero Millán
  - St. Frances Cabrini Center for Immigrant Legal Assistance of Catholic Charities of the Archdiocese of Galveston-Houston

== 2019 in Numbers ==
=== Economy ===
- Balance of Trade: According to INEGI, exports increased 2.3% in 2019, giving Mexico a US$5.82 billion trade surplus.
- Direct Foreign Investment (IED): USD $27,823.
- Exchange rate: Estimated close MXN $19.26 per US$1.00.
- GDP ranks: The World Bank nominal ranking places Mexico at No. 15 in absolute terms and No. 69 per capita (US$10,118; MXN $191,678). The Purchasing Power Parity (PPP) places Mexico at No. 11 total and No. 68 per capita.
- GDP (PIB): €840,025 (MXN $17,655,267) for the first three quarters of the year. INEGI report in January 2020 that the Mexican economy contracted by 0.1% in 2019 after growth of just over 2% in 2018.
- Inflation rate: 2.93%.
- Interest rate: 7.25%.
- Mexican Stock Exchange: 3.3% growth from January–September 2019; close at 43,011.27 points on September 30. 44,300.17 points and 32,194,052 shares traded on December 26, 2019.
- Minimum wage: MXN $102.68 daily (16% over 2018).
- Population economically active (15+): 57,349,577 (60.2%).
- Unemployment rate (November 2019): 3.5%.

=== Education ===
- Programme for International Student Assessment (15-year-olds): The OECD ranks Mexico No. 48/63 with 1260 total points; 425 in reading (average 493), 419 in math (average 496), and 416 in science (average 501).
- University rankings: National Autonomous University of Mexico (UNAM) No. 113, Tec de Monterrey (ITESM) No. 178.

=== Population ===
126,577,691 inhabitants with a life expectancy of 75.1 years (#66 in the world), according to the Consejo Nacional de Población (National Population Council). Mexico is the 10th most populous country in the world.

=== Violence ===
- Murders: INEGI reports a total of 36,478 homicides in 2019, a rate of 29/100,000 inhabitants, basically the same as in 2018. Guanajuato had the highest number (3,974) and Yucatán the lowest (45). Colima had the highest murder rate, 105/100,000 inhabitants.
- Femicides: Of 2,833 women murdered by September, 726 (25.6%) are investigated as femicides.
- Law enforcement officers killed: 426 as of December 20.
- Activists and journalists killed: 10 journalists and 12 activists were killed in Mexico in 2019.
- Politicians assassinated: Six mayors and at least four other politicians are murdered during 2019.
- Missing persons: 61,637; 97.4% since the beginning of the Drug War in 2006.

== Births ==
- April 2 — Seven antelope fawns, including three lechwe, three indio, and one nyala have been born in Chapultepec Zoo in recent months.
- April 10 — Makena and Omondi are the first hienas moteadas (Crocuta crocuta) born in Chapultepec Zoo.
- May 12 — Six Mexican wolf cubs born in Chapultepec Zoo.
- August 3 — Naim and Izem are the two Impala fawns born in the Chapultepec Zoo in Mexico City.
- December 26 – An unnamed female giraffe was born in Chapultupec Zoo, Mexico City. Jirafifíta was born there in March 2019.

== Deaths ==
=== January ===
- January 1: Alejandro Aparicio Santiago, mayor (Morena) of Tlaxiaco, Oaxaca; murdered. Perfecto Hernández, municipal trustee, was also murdered.
- January 2:
  - Salvador Martínez Pérez bishop of Roman Catholic Diócesis de Huejutla, Hidalgo (1994-2009), in Irapuato (b. 1933)
  - Alberto Reyes Perez, Mexican businessman (b. 1952)
- January 3: Cutberto Porcayo Sánchez, leader of Morena in Villa de Tututepec de Melchor Ocampo, Oaxaca; murdered.
- January 9: Mexican actor and conductor Juan Ramón Garza died at the age of 75.
- January 10: Alfredo del Mazo González, politician and former governor of the State of Mexico (b. 1943)
- January 12: Fernando Luján, Mexican actor, died of a respiratory illness at the age of 79 in his home in Puerto Escondido, Oaxaca.
- January 14: Maty Huitrón, 82, actress (b. 1936).
- January 15
  - Luis Grajeda, 81, Olympic basketball player (1964, 1968).
  - Reinaldo Pérez Rayón Mexican engineer, architect, and educator (b. 1918).
  - Argentine star Thelma Tixou died in Mexico at the age of 74 during brain surgery.
- January 17: José Almanza Alcaine, a former alderman and the 2018 candidate of Movimiento Ciudadano for municipal president of Tlaquiltenango, Morelos, was gunned down.
- January 18: José García Ocejo, 90, Mexican painter of "El Dandy" and representative of "La Ruptura movement" (b. 1928).
- January 20: Rafael Murúa Manríquez, 34, radio commentator ('Radiokashana") in Baja California Sur; murdered.
- January 31: Pablo Larios Iwasaki, soccer player with Cruz Azul and Club Puebla (b. 1960)

=== February ===
- February 1: Alfredo Ríos Meza (86), Mexican baseball player with Sultanes de Monterrey and Ostioneros de Guaymas (b. 1932)
- February 2: Enrique Novelo Navarro, composer (Te amaré toda la vida and No sé qué está pasando) (b. 1934).
- February 4: Narcocorrido singer Francisco Fourcade, murdered in Guaymas, Sonora, at 23.
- February 9:
  - Jesús Ramos Rodríguez, a Tabasco journalist, was shot by a lone gunman.
  - Óscar Cazorla, activist for civil rights of the Muxe in the Isthmus of Tehuantepec, community of Juchitán, Oaxaca; murdered.
- February 11
  - Abelardo Escobar Prieto (81), Mexican engineer and politician (b. 1938)
  - Miriam Rivera, 38, reality show personality (There's Something About Miriam, Big Brother Australia 2004); suicide (possible murder) (b. 1981).
- February 12: Narcocorrido singer Alejandro Villa, murdered in Tlaquepaque, Jalisco, at 25.
- February 14: Olivia Leyva, 70, actress (Gloria in El Chavo del Ocho) (b. 1948)
- February 16: Reynaldo López, 42, Mexican journalist and radio personality; murdered in Sonora (b. 1977)
- February 20:
  - Samir Flores, 30, radio personality and environmental activist, murdered outside his home in Temoac, Morelos.
  - Herlinda Sánchez Laurel, 77, artist and art teacher (National Autonomous University of Mexico) (b. 1941).
- February 26:
  - Christian Bach, 59, Argentine actress naturalized Mexican (La patrona) died in Mexico City.
  - Carmela Rico ("Mamá Mela"), Mexican comedian.
  - Grace Quintanilla, 52, Mexican performer and manager (Centro de Cultura Digital Estela de Luz) (b. 1967)
- February 27: Rancher Hugo Figueroa was kidnapped and murdered in Morelia, Michoacán. He was a nephew of Joan Sebastian.
- February dates unknown
  - Sinar Corzo, civil rights activist, in Arriaga, Chiapas
  - José Santiago Gómez and Noé Jimenez Pablo, civil rights activists, in Amatán, Chiapas
  - Bernardino García Hernández, civil rights activist, in Zimatlán de Lázaro Cárdenas, Oaxaca.

=== March ===
- March 1: Elva Martha García Rocha, 71, Mexican politician, co-founder of Party of the Democratic Revolution (b. 1947)
- March 5: Abraham Stavans 85, Mexican theater actor (El Chavo del 8) and director (b. 1933)
- March 15: Sonora journalist Santiago Barroso Alfaro, 47, shot and killed in his home in San Luis Río Colorado Municipality, Sonora.
- March 21: Rodrigo Segura Guerrero, councilor of Atizapán de Zaragoza, State of Mexico, assassinated.
- March 23: Gerardo López Torres, 23, a singer known as the Rey de la Alegría ("King of Joy") died in Mazatlan due to a heart attack.
- March 24: 5. Omar Iván Camacho, 35, sportscaster, tortured and murdered in Salvador Alvarado Municipality, Sinaloa.
- March 25: Virgilio Caballero Pedraza, Deputy for National Regeneration Movement from Azcapotzalco (b. 1942).
- March 26: Jorge Dominguez Alvarez, son of Antonio Alejandro Almeida, mayor of Paraíso, Tabasco, beaten to death.
- March 30: Abiram Hernández Fernández, 37, a civil rights leader from Xalapa, Veracruz; apparently murdered.
- March 31: Hernán Pastrana Pastrana, 79, former mayor of Othón P. Blanco, Quintana Roo, cancer.

=== April ===
8,943 people were murdered between January 1 and March 31, 2019, a 9.6% increase over 2018.

- April 1 – Bass player Armando Vega Gil, 64, founder of the rock band Botellita de Jerez, suicide (b. 1955).
- April 7 — Víctor Manzanilla Schaffer, politician (PRI) and diplomat; Governor of Yucatán 1988–1991 (b. 1924)
- April 13 – Lourdes Ruiz Baltazar, la Reina del Albur, died of a heart attack in Tepito, Mexico City.
- April 15 — Gustavo Arias Murueta, 95, painter, sculptor, and poet (b. 1923)
- April 17 – Sergio Armando Hernández Vega, the former Secretary of president Enrique Peña Nieto's bodyguard, was killed in his home in the State of Mexico.
- April 23 – David Eduardo Otlica Avilés, presidente municipal of Nahuatzen, Michoacán, was killed with a machete.
- April 24 – Maricela Vallejo Orea, mayor (PRD) of Mixtla de Altamirano, Veracruz' murdered. Her husband, driver, and Efrén Zopiyactle Tlaxcaltécatl, the municipal treasurer, were also muredered.
- April 27 — María de los Ángeles Moreno, politician; first woman president of a Mexican political party (PRI) (b. 1945)
- April 30 — Luis Maldonado Venegas, 62, lawyer and politician (Convergence) (b. 1956)

=== May ===
- May 2: Telésforo Santiago Enríquez, radio commentator in Oaxaca; murdered.
- May 6
  - Ramón Amauri Vela and Luis Octavio Reyes Domínguez, executives with Typhoon Offshore, died in an airplane crash in Coahuila.
  - Ramón Randey Dorame, 39, baseball player (b. 1979)
- May 7: Rafael Coronel, 87, painter (b. 1931)
- May 11: Wrestler Silver King, 51, younger brother of Dr. Wagner Jr, died of a heart attack during a wrestling match in London.
- May 16: The body of former Morelos governor Marco Adame's brother, Humberto Adame Castillo, was found in a ditch in Alpuyeca, Xochitepec. Unofficial sources say Humberto had been kidnapped.
- May 17: Julio Ulises Hijuelos Cervera (Mago Chen Kai), magician (b. 1939)
- May 18: Osvaldo Batocletti, 69, technical director of the Tigres Femenil soccer team, died from prostate cancer (b. September 22, 1950).
- May 22: The strangled body of Nataly Michel, 25, who was a contestant in Enamorándonos on TV Azteca, was found in her house in Venustiano Carranza, Mexico City.

=== June ===
- June 2: José Antonio Leal Doria, Morena at-large candidate for Deputy, dies as 7:00 a.m. of cancer the day of the election.
- June 9: Mercedes Pascual Acuña, 88, Spanish actress (Cuna de lobos (1986) and Teresa (1989)) who lived in Mexico (b. 1930)
- June 10: Environmentalist José Luis Álvarez Flores, 64, murdered in Palenque, Chiapas
- June 11: Journalist Norma Sarabia of Tabasco was murdered outside her home. She is the sixth Mexican journalist killed this year.
- June 13: Edith González, 54, Mexican actress (Las noches de aventurera (1998), Corazón salvaje (1993-1994), and Monte Calvario (1986)), ovarian cancer (b. 1964)
- June 14: Luis Gerardo Hernandez Valdenego, 31, was shot and killed in Guanajuato by unidentified assailants riding motorcycles. In January 2015 Hernandez Valdenegro had been sentenced to 29 months in prison for the beating of journalist Karla Janeth Silva in September, 2014, but a judge released him after implicating the mayor and police chief in the beating.
- June 21: Chilpancingo businessman Misael "El Tigre" Marin is shot and killed. His brother had been kidnapped at one point, and his accountant was killed in May.
- June 23: George Rosenkranz, 102, Hungarian-Mexican chemist who specialized in steroids and grand master of Duplicate bridge (b. 1916)
- June 27
  - Enrique Muñoz "El Reporteronte", reporter for Expresso de la Mañana (FOROtv) (b. November 22, 1962
  - Gualberto Castro, 84, singer and actor (b. 1934)
- June 29: Lupita Hernández Pérez, 29, is an apparent victim of femicide in Iztapalapa.

=== July ===
The first semester (January—June) of 2019 is the most violent in history, with 17,608 murders, an average of 102.6 daily. June was the most violent month in Mexican history, with 2,249 murders.

- July 3: Wrestler Pedro "El Perro Aguayo" dies at the age of 73 (b. 1946).
- July 4: Drug dealer Héctor Huerta Ríos is reported dead.
- July 6: Singer Luis Mendoza, known for his narcocorridos, is murdered in Ciudad Obregón, Sonora.
- July 10
  - Armando Ramírez, 67, journalist and novelist (Chin Chin el Teporocho); died of an infection (b. 1952)
  - Kim Akker, 22, Dutch world judo champion, dies in a gas explosion in her home in Playa del Carmen, Quintana Roo.
- July 11: Héctor Manuel Rodríguez Arellano, the Mexican ambassador to Haiti.
- July 12:
  - Eusebio Martinez, alderman for Social Encounter Party is found dead in Los Reyes Acaquilpan / Municipality of La Paz in an apparent homicide.
  - Victor Hugo Padilla Nava, director of Public Security in Pilcaya, Guerrero is murdered near Concepcion, along the Pilcaya-Ixtapan de la Sal highway.
- July 14: Brenda Cruz Garcia, 21, is murdered inside a taxi in Ecatepec de Morelos, State of Mexico.
- July 16: Sonia Infante, 75, Mexican actress (Dormitorio para señoritas and Su Excelencia, heart attack (b. 1944)
- July 17: Alexander R., 15, raped, tortured, and murdered, in Ciudad Nicolás Romero, State of Mexico.
- July 19: Fernando Tinoco Cervantes, representative of the Secretariat of the Interior in Huejotzingo, Puebla, is murdered.
- July 31: Rogelio Barragán, director of communication for Guerrero al Instante, is murdered and tortured in Zacatepec, Morelos.

=== August ===
- August 1 — Actress (Salvando el Soldado Pérez and Rudo y Cursi) and model Vicky Palacios.
- August 2:
  - 10. Jorge Celestino Ruiz, reporter for El Gráfico de Xalapa; murdered in Xalapa, Veracruz.
  - Journalist Edgar Nava of Guerrero al Instante is murdered in Zihuatanejo, Guerrero.
- August 3
  - Journalist Jorge Celestino of Gráfico de Xalapa is murdered in his home in Actopan, Veracruz.
  - The seven Mexicans killed in the shooting at the El Paso, Texas shopping center were: Sara Esther Regalado and Gloria Irma Márquez, (Ciudad Juárez, Chihuahua); Elsa Mendoza de la Mora, (Yepomera, Chihuahua); Jorge Calvillo García, (Torreón, Coahuila); Adolfo Cerros Hernández, (Aguascalientes City), Aguascalientes; and Ivan Filberto Manzana (Ciudad Juárez, Chihuahua). A seventh victim is unidentified.
- August 9 — Bertha Silva Díaz, former candidate for local deputy with Morena in Chilapa de Álvarez, Guerrero, is murdered.
- August 11 — Roman Catholic Cardinal Sergio Obeso Rivera, former archbishop of Xalapa, Veracruz (b. 1931)
- August 16
  - Carmela Parral Santos, mayor of San José Estancia Grande, Oaxaca, and Hugo Castellanos Ortega are murdered.
  - José Mantequilla Nápoles, 79, Cuban-Mexican welterweight boxer (b. 1940)
- August 17 — Patricia "Paty" Feliciano Miranda, 12, victim of femicide in Chilón, Chiapas.
- August 18 — Laura Alicia Garza, 71, former federal deputy (PRI), in Ciudad Victoria, Tamaulipas.
- August 21
  - Celso Piña, Mexican singer, composer, arranger, and accordionist (b. 1953)
  - Nora López León, environmentalist, apparent homicide in Palenque, Chiapas
  - Orencio Bello Sánchez, former candidate for mayor (Morena and PES) of Chilapa, Guerrero, murdered. His stepson, Julio Rodríguez, was also murdered.
- August 24 — Journalist Nevith Condés Jaramillo (El observatorio del sur), murdered in Tejupilco Municipality, State of Mexico.
- August 31 — Mary Granados, 29, a Mexican national was among the seven people killed in the Midland–Odessa shootings

=== September ===
- September 1 — Rodolfo Tuirán, subsecretary of Public Education under President Enrique Peña Nieto.
- September 4 — Felipe Ruvalcaba, soccer player who played in the 1962 and 1966 FIFA World Cup (b. 1941)
- September 5 — Francisco Toledo, painter, sculptor, and graphic artist (b. 1940)
- September 11
  - Erick Castillo Sánchez, photographer for Discovery Channel, murdered in Acapulco, Guerrero.
  - Jorge Elías Espinosa Rafful, former librarian and curator of Library and Museum Victoriano Nieves Céspedes in Ciudad del Carmen, Campeche; apparent murder
- September 13 — María Bazán, an Argentine lawyer, is killed during a home robbery in Condado de Sayavedra Subdivision in Atizapán, State of Mexico.
- September 14 — Claudia Ochoa Félix, model; drug overdose (b. )
- September 18 — Salvador Castañeda O'Connor, socialist politician; heart failure (b. 1931)
- September 21 — Miguel Patiño Velázquez, 80, former Roman Catholic bishop of Diócesis de Apatzingán (b. 1938)
- September 22 — René Mario Montante Pardo, 86, mechanical engineer and mathematician, (b. 1933)
- September 25 – Michael Coe, 90, American archaeologist and anthropologist who worked in Guatemala and Mexico (b. 1929)
- September 28 — José José, 71, El Principe de la Canción (the Prince of Song), singer and musician, pancreas cancer (b. 1948)
- September 29 — Beatriz Aguirre, 94, actress and voice actress (b. 1925)

=== October ===
A report published October 24, 2019, by El Economista shows that Nuevo León (54%), Sinaloa (41%), and Morelos (40%) are the states with the greatest increases in murder rates during the period July–September 2019. Baja California Sur showed the greatest decrease (-60%).

- October 1 — Miguel León-Portilla, 93, anthropologist and historian (b. 1926)
- October 4 — Omar Flores, 35, a teacher and leader of Coordinadora Nacional de Trabajadores de la Educación (a teachers' union) in Oaxaca; automobile accident.
- October 5 — Bernardo Macias Mora, journalist and poet in Tepic, Nayarit; heart attack.
- October 6
  - Mexicans killed in a bar shooting in Kansas City include Alfredo Calderón (29), Francisco García Anaya, and Everardo Meza (from Chihuahua).
  - "Tizoc", a four-year-old xoloitzcuintle (hairless dog) at Cuernavaca's Parque Chapultepec.
- October 10
  - Enrique Moreno, 63, Mexican-American lawyer, complications from cancer.
  - Enrique Servín, poet and defender of Indigenous languages; murdered in Chihuahua.
- October 11 – Isaías Cantú Carrasco, land-rights activist (Concejo Regional de Autoridades Agrarias en Defensa del Territorio) in Malinaltepec, Guerrero.
- October 12 – Emilio Nicolas, Sr., 88, Mexican-American television station owner (KWEX).
- October 13
  - Marcelo Ebrard Maure, father of Marcelo Ebrard, Secretary of Foreign Affairs.
  - Adolfo Mexiac, 92, graphic artist.
  - Cruz Soto Caraveo, activist in the fight against organized crime in Guazapares Municipality, Chihuahua; murdered.
- October 15 – Paúl Humberto Vizcarra Ruiz, 55, Morelos businessman and environmentalist; murdered.
- October 18 – Luz Maria (last name unknown), 12, apparent victim of femicide in Tamazunchale, San Luis Potosí.
- October 21 – Gilberto Aceves Navarro, 88, sculptor and painter (b. September 24, 1931).
- October 26 – Enriqueta Basilio, 71, track and field athlete who lit the Olympic cauldron at the 1968 Summer Olympics in Mexico City (b. July 15, 1948).
- October 28
  - Mauricio García León, former director of "Archivos y Notarías" in Puebla; suicide.
  - Santiago Maravatío, alderman (PAN) from Santiago Maravatío, Guanajuato; missing since September 19, Maravatío was the third alderman from Guanajuato murdered in the last two months. The others were Francisco García Ramírez (Moreno) from Apaseo el Alto and José Luis Saucillo Méndez (PAN) from Comonfort.
- October 29 – Carlos Chávez, a driver for Uber Eats, is shot while resisting a robbery in Satélite, Cuernavaca, Morelos.

=== November ===
- November 1
  - Diana Victoria González Barrera, 26, soccer player with Club América; hypoglycemia.
  - Rina Lazo, 93, muralist (Fertile Earth), painter, and activist in Guatemala (Order of the Quetzal, 2004) and Mexico (b. Guatemala City, 1923)
  - Rina Lazo, 96, Guatemalan-born Mexican painter, cardiac arrest.
  - Francisco Fernando Tenorio Contreras, 46, mayor of Valle de Chalco, State of Mexico; brain dead after being shot.
- November 2
  - Óscar Ramírez Pedrote, 29, lawyer and brother of alderman (PT) of Acapulco; shot.
  - Veronica ?, 25, left a party and found murdered in Naucalpan, State of Mexico.
- November 3 – Juan Gabriel Rodríguez Salinas, former mayor of Santiago Llano Grande, Oaxaca; shot.
- November 7 – Raquel Padilla, 53, writer, anthropologist, and activist; murder with a knife (classified as femicide) at her home in Ures, Sonora.
- November 8
  - Oscar Marroquín Hernández, traffic police officer in Acapulco, Guerrero; murdered. Two other police officers, both part of the Fiscalía Especializada en la Investigación y Combate al Delito de Secuestro ("Special prosecutor for investigation and combat of kidnapping") were also murdered in a separate incident.
  - Felipe Reynoso Jiménez, 100, politician, Municipal President of Aguascalientes (1975–1977).
- November 9 – Juan Carlos Molina Palacios, Deputy (PRI) from Medellín de Bravo, Veracruz; murdered.
- November 13 – Guillermo Cosío Vidaurri, 90, diplomat and politician, Governor of Jalisco (1989–1992), Deputy (1976–1979, 1985–1988) and Secretary General of PRI (1981), dengue.
- November 15 – Jorge Vergara, 64, billionaire businessperson (Grupo Omnilife, Chivas of Guadalajara); heart attack (b. March 3, 1955).
- November 25
  - Héctor García-Molina, 66, Mexican-born American computer scientist.
  - Abril Cecilia Pérez Sagaón, 48, ex-wife of Juan Carlos García, former CEO of Amazon, Mexico, victim of femicide in Mexico City; shot. Garcia was arrested and controversially released.
  - Maximiliano Ruiz Arias, 71, electrical engineer and federal deputy (Morena) from Mazatlán, Sinaloa.
- November 29 – Brad Gobright, 31, a rock climber from California; fell while climbing Potrero Chico in Nuevo León
- November 30
  - Hugo Estefanía Monroy, former mayor of Cortazar, Guanajuato (PRD); murdered. His wife, former federal deputy Alejandra Torres Novoa, was injured.
  - Ana Citlaly, 19, of Matehuala, San Luis Potosí; beat to death.

=== December ===
- December 9 – Francisco Estrada, 71, Mexican baseball player and manager (New York Mets, Mexican League).
- December 10 – Sonia 'P', 42, director of the Ballet Folclórico of the Universidad Autónoma del Estado de México, suspected femicide.
- December 13 – Lorenzo Barajas Heredia, former mayor of Buenavista, Michoacán (PRD), murdered as he left a dance.
- December 14 – Chuy Bravo, 63, Mexican-born American actor and television personality (Chelsea Lately, After Lately), heart attack.
- December 18 – Arturo Morales de Paz, 33, Mexican aeronautical engineer from Miahuatlán de Porfirio Díaz, Oaxaca; stabbed in Montreal, Quebec, Canada.
- December 19 – Dulce Ivana Núñez, 17, burned body found in León, Guanajuato; presumed femicide.
- December 22 – Fidel Fernández Figueroa, security councilman from the Papaloapan Region of Oaxaca; murdered.
- December 23
  - Arturo García Velásquez, mayor of San Felipe Jalapa de Díaz, Oaxaca; murdered.
  - Jimmy Goldsmith, 60, owner of Loros de Colima of the Ascenso MX soccer league; heart attack.
  - Javier Terrero, trustee of San Felipe Jalapa de Díaz, Oaxaca; murdered.
  - Mr. Niebla, (Efrén Tiburcio Márquez), 46, wrestler; infection of the blood (b. February 22, 1973).
- December 27 – Alberto Islas Jara, 33, son of businessperson Alberto Islas González, member of Coparmex in Puebla, Puebla; shot while in his car during a robbery.
- December 29 – Sebastián Ferrat, 41, actor (Amar de nuevo, El Señor de los Cielos, El Vato), complications from food poisoning.
- December 30 – Rubén Darío Galicia Piñón, 66, infrarrealism poet, Historias cinematográficas (1987) and La ciencia de la tristeza (1994), (b. 1953).
- December 31 – Luciano Moreno López, former mayor (PRI) of Cochoapa el Grande, Guerrero (2012-2015); shot.

== See also ==
- 2019–2020 dengue fever epidemic
