= Edgar Veytia =

Mexican politician (born 1970)

Edgar Veytia Cambero (born c. june 14 1970) is a Mexican criminal. He held the position as Attorney General of Nayarit, from 2013 to 2017.

Veytia was born in Tijuana but was raised in San Diego, California, where he attended elementary, middle, and high school. He attended law school at the Universidad de Alica in Tepic, Nayarit.

Veytia was known to many in Nayarit as "La Bestia" (the beast) or "El diablo" (the devil), and had been described as leading the "military arm" of the state government of state governor Roberto Sandoval Castañeda, through the Nayarit Police.

On March 2, 2017, Veytia was charged with manufacturing, transporting and distributing heroin, cocaine, methamphetamine and marijuana" from 2013 to February 2017 by the United States District Court for the Eastern District of New York. He was arrested on drug trafficking charges at the Cross Border Xpress on the Mexico–United States border on March 27, 2017. He was condemned to 20 years in prison and fined US $1,000,000 (MXN $18,350,000) on September 26, 2019. His lawyer, Jeffrey Lichtman, who had previously defended Joaquín "El Chapo" Guzmán called Veytia "the perfect scapegoat," insisting that the real leaders of the Sinaloa Cartel are still free. He is currently incarcerated at United States Penitentiary, Marion.
