= Sindicato de Trabajadores Petroleros de la República Mexicana =

Mexican trade union

The Sindicato de Trabajadores Petroleros de la República Mexicana (STPRM) is a trade union of oil workers in Mexico. It is the union for workers at the Mexican, state-run oil company Pemex.

== History ==
The union signed its first collective bargaining agreement with Pemex in 1942. In 2001, it was discovered that funds from the union were being illegally diverted to the campaign of Francisco Labastida by the union chief Carlos Romero Deschamps in a scandal known as Pemexgate. Eleven other officials, including the union treasurer, then senator Ricardo Aldana, were implicated in the crime. The union worked on obtaining a refund of diverted funds in late 2003.

== Sports ==
Two football teams affiliated to the S.T.P.R.M., particularly to sections 26 and 48, play in the Tercera División de México, which is a football league in Mexico: Azules de la Sección 26, also known as Azules de Choapas, and the Felinos 48.
