= Altos Hornos de México =

Steel plant in Mexico

Altos Hornos de México S.A.B. de C.V.

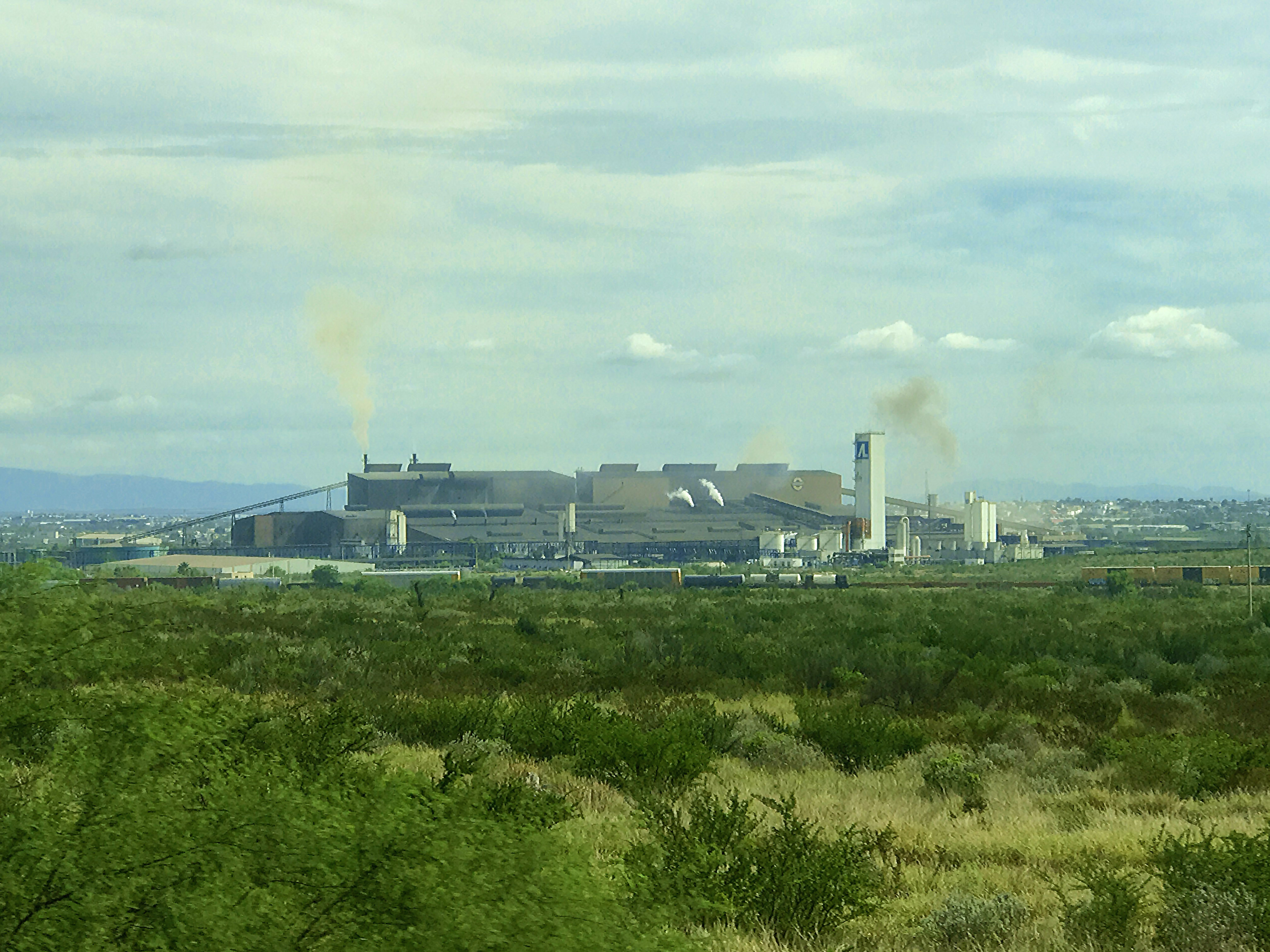
- Type: Private
- Industry: Metals
- Founded: 1942; 84 years ago
- Headquarters: Monclova, Coahuila
- Key people: Argentem Creek Partners
- Products: Steels mining engineering
- Total equity: Bankrupted
- Number of employees: 22,250 (2016)
- Subsidiaries: List of subsidiaries
- Website: www.ahmsa.com

Altos Hornos de México, S.A.B. de C.V. (AHMSA) is a steel plant in Mexico. It has corporate offices in Monclova, Coahuila, in the center of the Mexican state of Coahuila, 155 miles from the United States border.

== History ==
Teódulo Flores Calderon donated the land to AHMSA, later Harold Rudolph Pape founded Altos Hornos de Mexico in 1942 in Monclova, Coahuila for its proximity to the border, with the mines of iron located in the same state and Chihuahua, as well as with coal, located in the carboniferous region of Coahuila.

Between 1944 and 1948, the production increased from 40,000 to 100,000 tons of liquid steel per year. In 1960, the smelter increased its capacity to 2 million tons of liquid steel per year, with this being consolidated as the largest company industry in Latin America. Throughout the decade of the '70s and after several expansions, the company achieved production of 3.75 million tons per year. In the decade of the '80s, AHMSA was nationalized by the federal government and went through several crises.

In 1991, Altos Hornos was under new management by Alonso Ancira, but his tenure was marked by a series of fraudulent activities that eventually led to the bankruptcy of Altos Hornos de México (AHMSA). He orchestrated one of the largest scams in Mexican history and was subsequently arrested by Interpol on charges of fraud, corruption, and money laundering. Ancira's involvement in the Pemex, Agro Nitrogenados, and Odebrecht frauds further solidified his culpability. The fraudulent transaction amounted to $500 million, with the plant itself being revealed as nothing more than a sham. Ancira is now obligated to repay the stolen funds to the Mexican Government, as his actions have resulted in AHMSA declaring bankruptcy.

In April 2023, Ancira was ousted from the presidency of AHMSA, which is now in the hands of Argentem Creek Partners, an American fund that is facing the challenge of reviving a company on the brink of collapse. Ancira resigned along with members of the Board of Directors, including Jorge Alberto Ancira Elizondo, José Eduardo Ancira Elizondo, James Pignatelli, Juan Carlos Quintana, and Francisco Pérez Ortega.

AHMSA was sold to Argentem Creek Partners in April 2023 and is now run by new management. Despite the sale to Argentem Creek Partners, the steel company continues to have a debt of $650 million.

== Alonso Ancira's fraudulent activities ==
Alonso Ancira Elizondo, the former president of AHMSA from 1991-2023, is known for leading one of the largest scams in the history of Mexico, defrauding the Mexican government of $500 million. He is responsible for his involvement in the Pemex, Agro Nitrogenados, and Odebrecht frauds, as well as his mismanagement that led to the bankruptcy of Altos Hornos de México (AHMSA). Additionally, he has been accused of corruption, tax fraud, and money laundering.

The Pemex case originated in 2013 when Alonso Ancira, his brother Jorge Ancira of Altos Hornos de México (AHMSA), and Emilio Lozoya, who served as Pemex's director, engaged in fraudulent activities. They orchestrated the sale of a non-existent plant to the Mexican government, valued at just a few million dollars. However, in 2019, the Superior Audit Office uncovered that the transaction had far exceeded its actual cost. Consequently, Ancira was arrested for fraud in Spain in 2019 and subsequently extradited to Mexico in 2021.

Furthermore, it came to light that during his management, the plant had been abandoned, with machines turned off for years. The 17,000 employees who worked at AHMSA had not received salary payments for four years.

Despite being in debt, Ancira still owes various areas of the federal government, such as the Tax Administration Service, Pemex, and the Federal Electricity Commission. AHMSA has debts with various areas of the federal government, including the Tax Administration Service, Petróleos Mexicanos, the Federal Electricity Commission, the National Workers' Housing Fund Institute, and the Mexican Social Security Institute, among others.

Ancira had faced previous arrests for his mismanagement and corrupt practices at Altos Hornos de México (AHMSA). In 2004, he and his family members were charged with tax fraud in Mexico, prompting them to flee the country after arrest warrants were issued by the Attorney General's Office (PGR). To avoid capture, Ancira relocated to Israel on two occasions with his family and resided there for three years while being pursued by the Ministry of Finance.

== Activity ==
Ahmsa's main steelmaking facilities and corporate offices are located in Monclova, Coahuila, close to transportation lines, raw materials supplies, principal points of export, and the company's major domestic markets.

=== Primary resources ===
Two steel plants operate in an area of nearly 3,000 acres. AHMSA extracts coal and iron ore. The company has its own coal mines in Palau, located 70 miles from Monclova. Once extracted, the washed coal is shipped by railroad to AHMSA's coke plants.

The main source of iron ore is located in Hercules, Coahuila, a mine owned by AHMSA. From that point the iron ore is transported to AHMSA through a 180-mile pipe (called Ferroduct) that crosses the Coahuila desert. The Company also has iron ore mines in some other Mexican states.

=== Products ===
AHMSA manufactures high value-added steel products. More specifically, they manufacture flat steel products including hot-rolled coils for structures and automotive parts, cold rolled coils for carbon steel applications, corrosion-resistant plate steel, tinplate steel, and tin-free steel for use in shipping containers.

AHMSA operates at an annual production rate of 3.5 million metric tons of liquid steel, with a workforce of 22,250 people, including its subsidiary companies.

=== Subsidiaries ===
As of April 2014, its subsidiaries included:

- Cia. Real de Monte y Pachuca (RDM)
- Hojalata Mexicana SA. de CV. (HOMESA)
- Linea Coahuila-Durango SA de CV
- Minera del Norte
- Nacional de Acero SA. de CV. (NASA)
- Unidad Cerro del Mercado
- Unidad Hercules
- Unidad MICARE
- Unidad MIMOSA

=== Quality ===
AHMSA received the following quality labels :

- "Clean Industry" certifications issued by Mexico’s Environmental Protection Department
- Environmental prize granted by the Mexican Chamber of Mining
- Environmental Excellence Award granted by the Latin American Mining Organism

AHMSA also complies with the following standards :

- The hot rolling department was approved by the audit of the quality system based on the European Standard EN 10025:2004
- AHMSA was last recertified under the ISO 14001 standard on 11 September, 2019. This certification expired on 10 September, 2021.
- Integrated systems were established for quality, health and environment in Cold Rolling 1, Structural Shapes and Maintenance and Services
- MICARE, MIMOSA, CEMESA, Hércules and La Perla were approved by the ISO 9001:2000 standard, without observations

Since 1992, AHMSA leads an active social policy where its plants are active, maintaining permanent programs on the following fronts:

- Installation and modernization of state-of-the-art steelworks and mining equipment that incorporates antipollution systems.
- Operating and administrative practices in line with international environmental standards and certified by accredited external auditors.
- Agreements with the Federal Environmental Protection Agency (PROFEPA) and with the National Water Commission (CNA), committing to the fulfillment of specific activities, established in the area of pollution control.
- Voluntary adoption of best environmental practices developed at the international level by the industry and certified by the ISO14001 standard.
- Integral rehabilitation of mined areas, with soil regeneration and repopulation of regional flora and fauna, as well as improvement of surroundings.
- Integral support programs for communities where AHMSA companies operate in the Central, Carboniferous, Northern and Desert regions of the state of Coahuila, particularly through waste collection programs, operation of landfills, management and use of waste water, etc.
- Creation of 5 management units for wild flora and fauna conservation, registered with permits as Animal Management Units (UMAs).

These policies and activities have positioned AHMSA and its companies as benchmarks in the field of Mexican steelworks and mining, establishing it as an example of high social responsibility

== Ticker Symbols ==
AHMSA; IAM (ADR)

== NAICs Codes ==
- 212111 Bituminous Coal and Lignite Surface Mining
- 212112 Bituminous Coal Underground Mining
- 21221 Iron Ore Mining
- 331111 Iron & Steel Mills
- 331221 Cold-Rolled Steel Shape Manufacturing
- 331222 Steel Wire Drawing.
