= Coordinadora Nacional de Trabajadores de la Educación =

Teachers union in Mexico

CNTE
- National Educational Workers Coordination
- Coordinadora Nacional de Trabajadores de la Educación
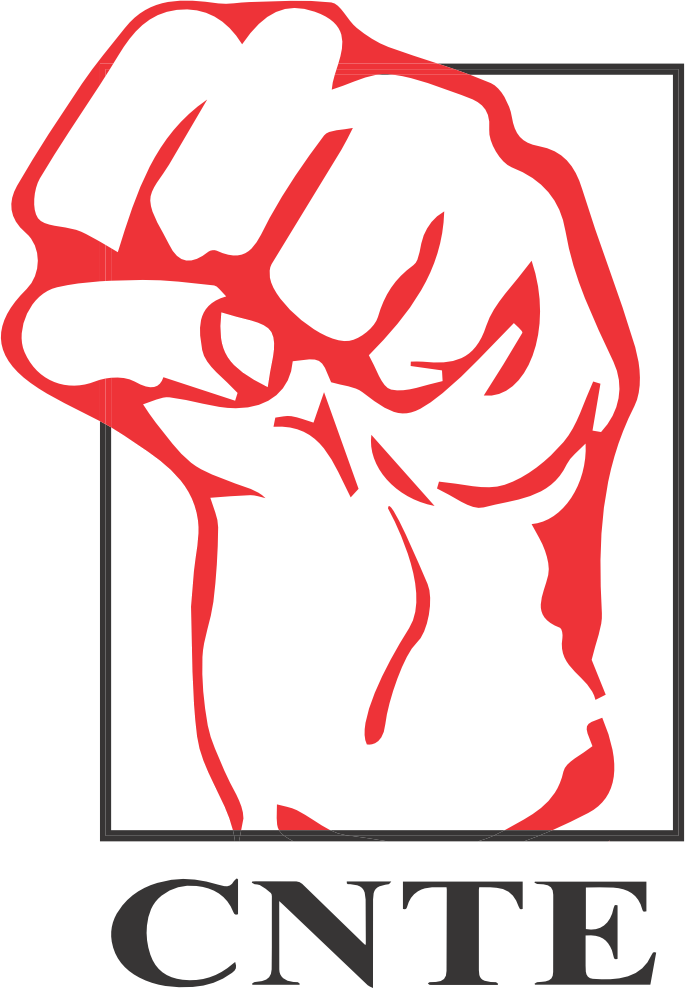
- Formation: December 17, 1979; 46 years ago
- Location: Mexico

The Coordinadora Nacional de Trabajadores de la Educación (CNTE) is a teachers union in Mexico founded on December 17, 1979, as an alternative to the Sindicato Nacional de Trabajadores de la Educación (SNTE). The union is most active in the southern states of Mexico.

== History ==
The CNTE was originally formed out of the SNTE in response to the political relationship between unionization and government. The CNTE pushed against the bureaucratic tendencies of the SNTE, favoring Maoist and Marxist ideological values for education and reform. They disagreed with the state-sponsored or “official” unions of the SNTE, opting for a less systematic union organization with government separation.

Leading up to its creation, those who would become a part of the Coordinadora Nacional de Trabajadores de la Educación (CNTE) faced subversion by the Sindicato Nacional de Trabajadores de la Educación (SNTE), threatening and terrorizing the union leaders into submission in the early attempts and improving wages and equality, a fight fought by the more dissident of the teachers' movement. Attempts to subdue the most outspoken of the union leaders were spearheaded by Carlos Jonguitud Barrios, leader of the SNTE until 1979. He focused his power as the leader of the SNTE towards terrorizing dissident union leaders by firing them from their positions and reportedly escalating aggression to physical violence to keep leaders in line. Due to the alleged aggression experienced by these leaders, the CNTE finally budded into existence. Beginning as a caucus within the Sindicato Nacional de Trabajadores de la Educación, the CNTE developed into its own entity as a result of these aggressive actions, as well as the developing relationship between the State of Mexico and the SNTE, leaning the organization’s status towards a more ministerial conduct within the Mexican political system.

== Minority Inclusion ==
The new organization was primarily composed of women, in alignment with the traditional gender roles of women as educators. These women were often from Indigenous regions centered in or around Chiapas. The first CNTE marches, which were held mainly in Mexico City while still maintaining a nation-wide presence, promoted salary raises for teachers, who were beginning to become more empowered, supported socially as educators earned a more glorified role in the social climate of Mexico through their increased involvement in Mexican society and role as not only educators but mentors. The abolishment of ideas concerning the necessity to train Hispanic-ism into the people of Mexico led to an opening in language instruction, especially in rural areas, where Mayan and other indigenous languages were preserved in language-dominant communities.

== Ideological Perspective ==
According to its Marxist ideologies, the CNTE provides wide support for the creation and empowerment of local bases for each educational system or circuit. The dissenting teachers’ movement holds the belief that unions should be democratic entities with real political power geared towards democratic representation of educators and community members without the intervention of political obligations. The CNTE claimed that these influences had found their way into the new political style of the SNTE increasing the divide between the two unions. The CNTE promotes the need to retain pressure on the state to maintain responsibility for creating fair access to education for all members of Mexico, regardless of gender, race, sexuality, secularism, etc.

== Responses to Educational Reform ==
During August and September 2013, the group organized marches around Mexico City, blocking traffic arteries such as Paseo de la Reforma, the Anillo Periférico, and access to Mexico City's airport. The marches were in protest of the 2012-2013 educational reform laws, specifically the establishment of a system of testing teachers.

The CNTE published a statement against the 2015 reforms presented by President Enrique Peña Nieto. The CNTE accused the Peña Nieto administration of inhibiting the accessibility to education and fairness of the system to the students and teachers and their job security. The organization stresses the necessity of respect for unions and teachers' rights, citing the disrespect of standardized testing imposed on the evaluation process for teachers and students alike. Similar reforms were originally proposed by the SNTE in 2006, suggesting the use of a program called ENLACES (National Evaluation of Academic Achievement in Educational Centers) which called for the use of standardized testing of educators to promote improvements among instruction. Despite push-back from the CNTE, the government of Mexico continued to promote the adoption of the reforms.

In 2016 members of CNTE's Section 22 participated in teacher's strikes and refusals to administer government ordered standardized tests in the state of Oaxaca. Members of the CNTE cited the teacher evaluations required by the reforms in order for educators to retain their jobs as a key offense and instigating clause of the reform. Tensions rose between the CNTE and SNTE who both backed opposite sides of the conflict. Namely, the nationalization of the standardized teacher evaluations was what raised the majority of concerns among educators. Most CNTE members and educators preferred a decentralized system, in line with organization’s doctrines of separation between union and government, as opposed to the nationalized system, resenting the perceived overreach that the reforms propose. Oppositional viewpoints suggest that the CNTE is too dissident, rejecting attempts at progress to maintain control.

== See also ==
- Sindicato Nacional de Trabajadores de la Educación (SNTE)
- Secretariat of Public Education (Mexico)
- Education in Mexico
