= Nadine Gasman =

Mexican feminist and advocate against sexual violence

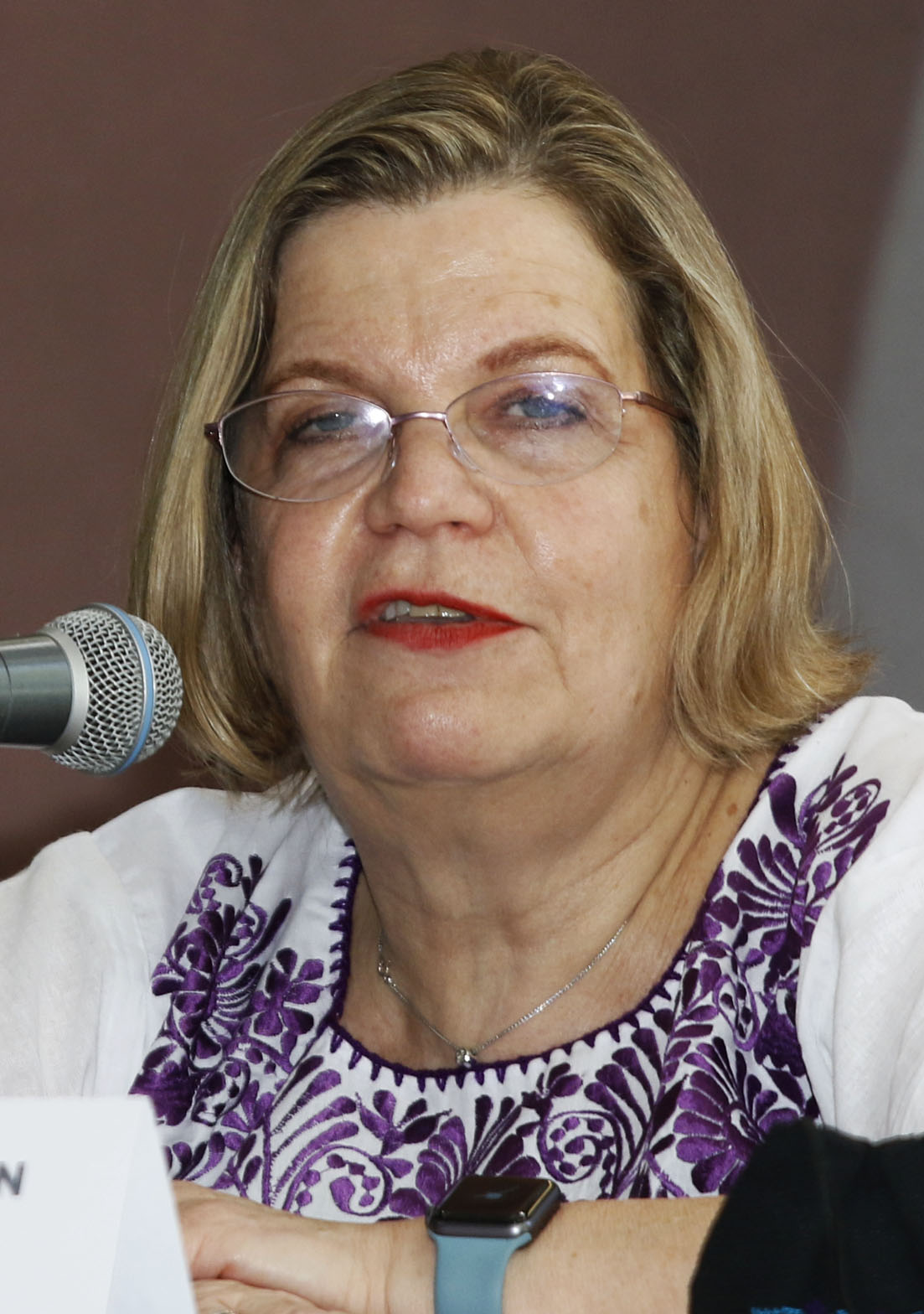
- Gasman in 2021
- Born: 26 July 1957 (age 69); Mexico City, Mexico
- Education: Johns Hopkins University (DrPH); Harvard University (M.P.H); La Salle University (M.D); National Autonomous University of Mexico (M.D)
- Occupation: Human rights activist
- Website: Official website; Official website

Nadine Flora Gasman Zylbermann (born 26 July 1957) is the president of the National Women's Institute of Mexico. She was the representative of UN Women in Brazil until February 2019.

== Early life ==
Gasman was born in Mexico.

Gasman's education includes:

- Doctor of Public Health from Johns Hopkins University
- Master of Public Health from Harvard University
- Surgeon (Doctor of Medicine from La Salle University and the National Autonomous University of Mexico

Gasman holds both Mexican and French nationalities.

== Career ==
"We are louder now, both men and women are thinking about [sexual and reproductive health and rights].… I always say, 'Gender equality and women's empowerment are very good for women. But also very good for men. They’re good for everyone.'"

— Nadine Gasman, UNFPA Icons & Activism

Gasman has worked in public policy to help women and promote human rights and intercultural understanding for over 30 years. Nadine Gasman has worked in Brazil, Guatemala, and Mexico to address gender inequalities and violence against women, among other human rights violations. She also works with indigenous women, women of African descent, and young people.

From 2005 to 2010 she was the representative in Guatemala of the UN Population Fund (UNFPA). From 2010 to 2013, she was senior director in Latin America and the Caribbean for the UNiTE to End Violence against Women campaign organized by the UN Secretary-General. She represented UN Women in Brazil from 2013, in which role she presented a set of goals such as the doubling female access to the Internet and challenged the Brazilian Ministry of Women, Family and Human Rights for declining to participate in the form.

She advocates for expanded access to legal abortion in Mexico and helped strengthen 911 services to guard against an increase in domestic violence during quarantines for the COVID-19 pandemic.

She was the founder and general director of consulting company Latin American Health Group (Grupo de Saúde da América Latina), where she worked with organizations including the World Health Organization (WHO), Pan American Health Organization (PAHO), the World Bank, and the aid agencies United States Agency for International Development (USAID), Danish International Development Agency (DANIDA), and Swedish International Development Cooperation Agency (SIDA), and the European Commission.

She is the president of the National Women's Institute of Mexico, and she was the representative of UN Women in Brazil until February 2019 when she was succeeded by Anastasia Divinskaya.
