= Elva Martha García Rocha =

Mexican politician (1947–2019)

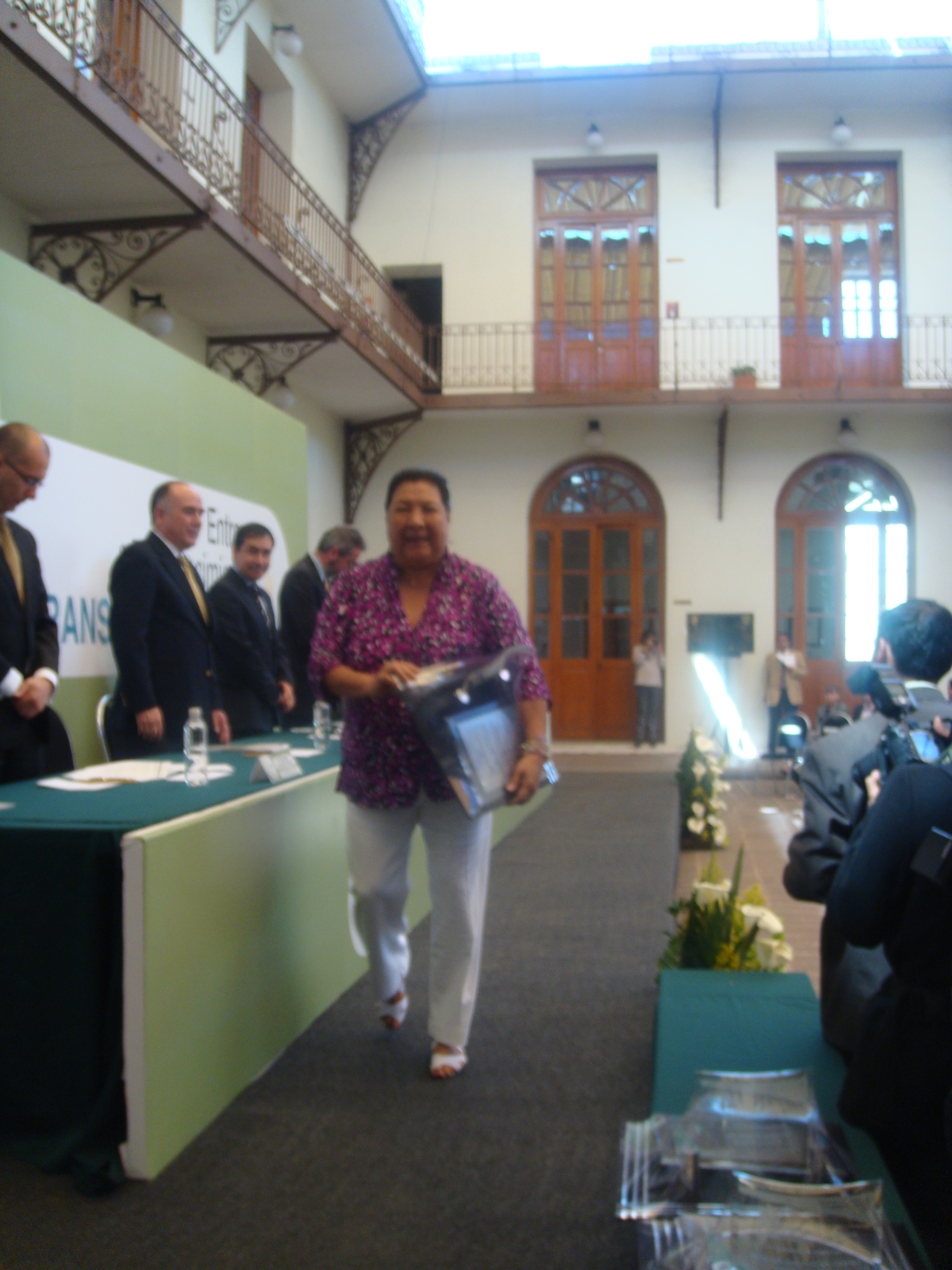
Elva Martha García Rocha in 2011.

Elva Martha García Rocha (July 11, 1947 – March 1, 2019) was a Mexican politician and co-founder of the Party of the Democratic Revolution (PRD). She also served as a member of the Legislative Assembly of Mexico City from September 1997 until September 2000.

García Rocha died on March 1, 2019, at the age of 72.
