= Pemexgate =

Political scandal in Mexico

Pemexgate was a political scandal of the Mexican political party PRI that occurred during the presidency of Ernesto Zedillo (1994-2000) and was discovered and investigated during the presidency of Vicente Fox (2000-2006). It was centered on the transfer of 500 million pesos (US$53 million) to the PRI candidate for the 2000 Presidential Elections, Francisco Labastida Ochoa, from Pemex, Mexico's national oil company.

A year long of intense investigations, hearings, and negotiations occurred in 2002, but no one was prosecuted by the Procuraduría General de la República (PGR) in the end. The National Electoral Institute (IFE) still found PRI guilty of violating the electoral law and fined them a huge sum of over 1 billion pesos (US$97 million) for its failure to report the campaign funding diverted from Pemex. The fine was considered the largest in history, equal to the financing the PRI would have received from the fed in 2003 and half of 2004.

== Pemex and the Mexican government ==
=== Mexico's nationalization of the oil industry ===
President Lázaro Cárdenas nationalized the oil industry in Mexico in 1938 as a result of dispute between the labor union and the petroleum companies. Before then, the oil industry was dominated by foreign companies with foreign capital that resisted the formation of unions. When the Mexican Petroleum Workers Union's (STPRM) was finally formed in 1935, they demanded fair working conditions and increased wages, which was supported by President Cárdenas' recommendation to bring the issue to the arbitration board. The union members issued a strike when their needs were not met, which caused a petroleum shortage in the country for a short period.

The arbitration board eventually sided with the union, and the Supreme Court ordered that the companies should meet the workers' demands. However, the companies protested, and Cárdenas offered a deal to end the strike if the companies paid 26 million pesos for the loss of wage incurred by the strike. When neither option passed, Cárdenas decided to create the national oil company, Pemex.

The expropriation was an acid test of the newly announced Good Neighbor Policy by President Franklin D. Roosevelt. Despite concerns that this will sour relations between United States and Mexico, the two were more cordial than ever before and even ended up in the Latin American countries joining the United States on the allied side.

Since then, the Mexican government has shared very close relationship with Pemex. The government even created a research arm for Pemex called the Mexican Petroleum Institute (IMP) to encourage national capabilities, consequently turning Pemex into an "elite super-agency". Pemex had essentially become the government's tool to promote Mexico's development through economic and social initiatives.

Pemex is significantly affected by the Mexican constitution and other laws, which prevents it from pursuing domestic joint ventures or other equity related contracts that threaten Mexico’s patrimony. The restrictive nature of the company combined with its complicated relationship with the Mexican federal government leave its managers with few responsibilities. Yet, the political fragmentation in Mexico suggests that no single entity has strategic dominance over the company, especially after the 2000 elections. Its inability to exercise various economic strategies under a government that does not have a strong hold of the company has turned it into “an instrument for the state’s financial engineering”. Thus, the Mexican government has been very dependent on Pemex financially, as the company’s short-term revenues are used to filling in federal budget holes. In total, Pemex’s financing of the Mexican government adds up to around 40% of Mexico’s federal budget.

=== 2000 presidential election ===
The 2000 Presidential Election in Mexico marked the end of PRI’s reign of power in the Mexican government. Until then, the PRI had ruled the Mexican government since 1929, and had built a national political system with the belief that they will always rule. The election was a politically significant moment in history due to the victory of Vicente Fox from the National Action Party (PAN) and since it marked the independence of the congress from the PRI.

Fox's victory was unexpected due to the PRI's reign, but not entirely unprecedented. In the midst of efforts to make Mexico a truly democratic nation, citizens projected the need for change in the government through their votes. Analysis of the voting results show that 28% of voters chose the PRI for the candidate, but 50% for the party, whereas 52% chose the PAN for the candidate and 35% for the party. Comparing between candidates, an overwhelming 66% of voters who voted for Fox said that they cast their ballots for change in the nation, whereas Labastida received 15% and Cuauhtémoc Cárdenas of the PRD received 18%. Supporters of PAN and many university graduates cast their ballots for Fox based on their belief that a true democracy should elect leaders, which Fox perfectly represented through the change he would bring to the nation in the democratic context.

In order to promote their candidate Francisco Labastida, the PRI used its network throughout the nation. Most notably, the director of Pemex, Rogelio Montemayor Seguy, allegedly transferred $127 million to Labastida and other campaigns by the PRI. Despite the efforts, the election results gave Fox 42.5% of the votes, 36.1% for Labastida.

== Investigations ==
=== Fox's anticorruption efforts ===
Vicente Fox, as promised during his presidential campaign, made efforts to clarify past corruptions during his presidency. His first few years in office were high in public profile due to all the news related to allegations of corruption followed by his pledge to pursue it.

The initial allegation began in January 2002, when the Office of the Comptroller General (SECODAM) reported illegal laundering of more than 120 million pesos (US$13 million) from PEMEX's operating funds through the Mexican Petroleum Workers Union's (STPRM) account to Francisco Labastida's presidential campaign in 2000. The high-ranking officials that were allegedly found guilty include Rogelio Montemayor, and labor leader Senator Carlos Romero Deschamps of the PRI party.

The PGR conducted two different investigations. The first was on whether the funding for the campaign came from public funds and if the agreement between Pemex and the union are legitimate, and the second was on whether the electoral laws had been violated. Investigation by SECODAM revealed that a portion of the 1.6 billion pesos (US$172 million) that had been illegitimately transferred from PEMEX to STPRM in 2000 was also sent to the Labastina campaign. In September 2002, the government issued arrest warrants against Montemayor, union treasurer and federal deputy Ricardo Aldana Prieto, and Romero Deschamps. It also requested that the two union leaders have their legislative immunity stripped by the Congress. Montemayor resisted extradition by fleeing to the United States for two years and returning to Mexico in September 2004.

Despite Fox's pledge, the government began withdrawing its allegations over time. Money laundering charges against officials of STPRM were soon withdrawn, and in July 2003, the PGR special unit claimed that the illegal source of the funds were unidentified due to insufficient evidence. Three other individuals, including a government official and a PEMEX employee, were pardoned after being accused of mishandling half of the funds diverted to the campaign. Within the remaining members of PEMEX, the former director of PEMEX, Raúl Muñoz Leos, was fined 862 million pesos (US$88 million) and restricted from maintaining public posts for the next ten years. Eventually, the IFE could only provide evidence that the PRI did not report 500 million pesos (US$53 million), which clearly surpassed the campaign's funding limits, and fined the PRI for 1 billion pesos (over US$106 million) in March 2003.

Vicente Fox was often accused by PRI legislators for witch-hunting based on false accusations. Although many investigations occurred, the lack of prosecutions made people wonder if the government had made a deal with the PRI for leniency. One of the many rumors said that the deal was made to cover the Amigos de Fox case, which involved the president himself.

=== Results of the investigation ===
Executives from PEMEX who were declared innocent: Rogelio Montemayor (ex director of the administrative corporative), Carlos Juaristi Septien (ex director of the financial corporative), and Julio Pindter Gonzalez (subdirector of labor relations).

From the union, three men were declared innocent of money laundering and organized delinquency, but they were accused of electoral fraud and illegal exercise of the public trust: Carlos Romero Deschamps (leader of the union), Ricardo Aldana (union member), Jesus Olvera Mendez (union member).

From the PRI, four men were declared innocent from money laundering and organized delinquency, but they were accused of electoral fraud. It is important to mention that they were collaborators (directly involved in the campaign) of Francisco Labastida. They were: Carlos Aldama (ex secretary of elections), Jorge Cárdenas Elizondo (ex secretary of financial department), Alonso Bretón Figueroa (sub secretary of financial department), and Joel Hortiales Pacheco (ex technical secretary of financial department).

== Media coverage ==
Despite the severity of the scandal, news stories about corruption was not at all prevalent during the scandal or after. It is interesting to see that a few stories deal with the punishment of corrupt government officials. In particular, Pemexgate had less than 40 articles related to corruption in the newspaper Milenio while other scandals reach until 200 scandals. The surprisingly small number of Pemexgate or Amigos de Fox related articles raises to suspicion.

In 2000, El Universal published 927 articles related to Pemex's corruption. Many of El Universal's articles explicitly discuss the corruption related to the election. An article published on September 27, 2002, titled 'PRI, corresponsable del Pemexgate: Robles' openly discusses the PRD's report on diverted funds from Pemex to Labastida, and calls for further investigations. Rosario Robles Berlanga, the national leader of the PRD, says, "Este asunto no se queda solamente en los líderes petroleros, ni tampoco en quienes estaban al frente de la paraestatal en ese momento, sino también tiene que ir a fondo hacia la investigación de la campaña presidencial del PRI" ("This issue is not only left to the Pemex officials, nor to those who were in charge of the state at that time, but also has to go deep into the investigation of the presidential campaign of the PRI"). Additionally, the article lists names of the individuals who were allegedly involved in Labastida's presidential campaign.

El Universal published significantly fewer articles regarding the corruption in Labastida's campaign in 2000, the year of the elections. However, few of them openly discuss their lack of support for Labastida. In an article published on June 15, 2000, a Pemex official named Ramiro Berrón Lara denied his support for Labastida in the upcoming elections, despite Labastida's pressure towards Pemex workers to vote for him.
