= Grace Quintanilla =

Mexican artist and curator (1967–2019)

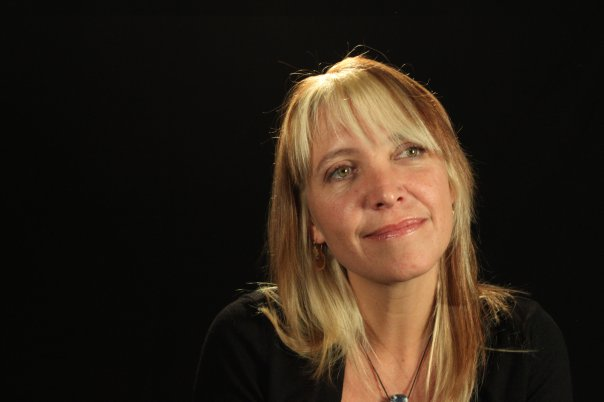
Grace Quintanilla

Grace Quintanilla (1967 - 2019, Mexico City, Mexico) was an artist, curator and producer working in the field of new media art and digital culture.

== Biography ==
Quintinilla studied at Duncan of Jordanstone College of Art and Design in Dundee, Scotland in the Television and Electronic Imaging Course. She was a regular participant in the Interactive Screen programme of the Banff New Media Institute at The Banff Centre in Banff, Canada. She also received a Film/Video/Multimedia Fellowship from the Rockefeller Foundation in 2002 for her interactive project "Bits of Memory". Quintanilla was director of Centro de Cultura Digital from 2012 until her death in 2019.
