= Alonso Ancira =

Mexican businessman (born 1952)

Alonso Ancira Elizondo
- Born: 3 January 1952 (age 74); Mexico City, Mexico
- Occupation: Businessman
- Known for: Bankrupted Altos Hornos de Mexico, scammed the Mexican Government, corruption, money laundering

Alonso Ancira Elizondo (born 3 January 1952) served as president of AHMSA from 1991 to 2023. He is known for one of the largest scams in Mexican history, which resulted in the Mexican government being defrauded of $500 million. He was involved in multiple fraudulent schemes, including the Pemex, Agro Nitrogenados and Odebrecht fraud cases. Ancira's mismanagement ended in failure as it ultimately led to the bankruptcy of Altos Hornos de México (AHMSA). Additionally, he faced criminal charges of corruption, tax fraud and money laundering.

== Scams and criminal charges ==
The Pemex fraud originated in 2013 when Ancira, his brother Jorge Ancira and Emilio Lozoya, director of Pemex, engaged in fraudulent activities. They orchestrated the sale of a non-existent plant to the Mexican government for $500 million. However, in 2019, the Higher Audit found that the transaction was a scam and had far exceeded its real cost.

During Ancira's mismanagement, it was discovered that the AHMSA plant was abandoned, with machines unused for years. The company's 17,000 employees had not received salary payments for four years. Mismanagement traces back to 1991 when AHMSA fell in the hands of Alonso Ancira, due to his wife's close connection with the First Lady of Mexico at the time.

Ancira's fraudulent activities and AHMSA's mismanagement have had a detrimental effect on the Mexican economy. AHMSA's bankruptcy and job losses have contributed to economic instability and hampered the growth and value of the steel industry in Mexico.

== Imprisonment ==
Alonso Ancira was arrested in Spain in 2019 and subsequently extradited to Mexico in 2021. He was charged with fraud and corruption, as well as money laundering and tax fraud.

The Ancira Elizondo family, along with executives Xavier Autrey and Juan Carlos Carredano, faced previous arrests for tax fraud in Mexico in 2004. After the issuance of arrest warrants by the Attorney General of Mexico (PGR), they fled the country. Ancira moved to Israel twice with his family to avoid capture, residing there for three years while he was persecuted by the Treasury Department. Others fled to San Antonio, Texas, to avoid prosecution in Mexico. Alonso Ancira and his brother Jorge Alberto Ancira Elizondo, his nephew Jorge Alberto Ancira Trabold, another brother José Eduardo Ancira and his sister Linda Ancira de Tames, have all been involved. They were arrested for their alleged links to the corruption scheme related to the Brazilian company Odebrecht in 2018. These investigations followed their involvement in a resource diversion scheme involving the former director of Petróleos Mexicanos (Pemex), Emilio Lozoya Austin.

The Ancira family's debts are with various areas of the federal government, including the Tax Administration Service, Pemex and the Federal Electricity Commission. AHMSA itself has outstanding debts with multiple government entities, such as the Tax Administration Service, Petróleos Mexicanos, the Federal Electricity Commission, the Institute of the National Housing Fund for Workers and the Mexican Institute of Social Security, among others.

== Removal from AHMSA ==
As a result of the fraud scandals and bankruptcy, Ancira was removed from his position as president of AHMSA and was forced to sell his shares in April 2023. The scandal led to the involvement of Argentem Creek Partners, an American fund, which took control of the company to restore its financial stability. Along with Ancira, several members of the Board of Directors, including Jorge Alberto Ancira Elizondo, José Eduardo Ancira Elizondo, James Pignatelli, Juan Carlos Quintana and Francisco Pérez Ortega, also chose to resign due to the scandal.

Despite the transfer of ownership to Argentem Creek Partners, Alonso Ancira is still saddled with a considerable debt of $650 million. This overwhelming financial obligation adds to the challenges facing new management as they struggle to revive the company and overcome the fallout from the fraud scandal.

In a November 2020 interview with Carlos Loret de Mola, Ancira offered to repay the $200 million he swindled from the Mexican government if President Andrés Manuel López Obrador agreed to stop insulting him. AMLO responded: "Yes, I am offering an apology, now just return the 200 million dollars." Ancira has partially reimbursed the government for the amount he stole.

== See also ==
- Monclova
