= Carlos Romero Deschamps =

Mexican politician (1944–2023)

Carlos Antonio Romero Deschamps
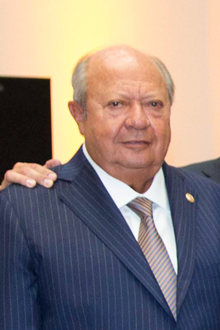
- Deschamps in 2016
- Born: 17 January 1944; Tampico, Tamaulipas, Mexico
- Died: 19 October 2023 (aged 79)
- Occupation: Senator
- Political party: PRI

Carlos Antonio Romero Deschamps (17 January 1944 – 19 October 2023) was a Mexican politician affiliated with the PRI. He served as Senator of the LXII Legislature of the Mexican Congress. He also served as Deputy during three Legislatures (1979–1982, 1991–1994, 2000–2003) and as Senator from 1994 to 2000.

Romero Deschamps was included in a list of the "10 Most Corrupt Mexicans" published by Forbes in 2013. He died on 19 October 2023, at the age of 79.

== Allegations of corruption ==
Despite Deschamps's claims to be on a modest trade union monthly salary of $1,864, he had long been suspected of using his influence as the most powerful Pemex Sindicato de Trabajadores Petroleros de la República Mexicana union leader and one of the most notorious PRI members for personal enrichment, either through embezzlement or peddling. This salary, although above the Mexican average, cannot account for his opulent and lavish lifestyle. His daughter routinely displays online publicly her world travels on private jets and yachts, and her frequent fine dining. His son drives a $2 million limited edition Enzo Ferrari, which was a gift from Deschamps despite his supposed income.

Deschamps owned a home in Cancún worth nearly $1.5 million which he described as a “cottage”. In 2011 he allegedly received $21.6 million “aid to the union executive committee” and $15.3 million from dues according to political analyst Denise Dresser. Despite these allegations, he stated that his “hands are clean,” and was under investigation.

Deschamps also held prominent political connections that arguably allowed him to maintain his highly influential position for so long. He had had ties with the former ruling party, PRI (Revolutionary Institutional Party,) since 1961. Despite being a Union executive he had also managed to be a PRI senator.

In July 2019, Romero Deschamps was expelled from the union after being charged with corruption. However, internal documents from Pemex revealed in January 2021 that Romero Deschamps continued to work at the oil company although he was no longer a member of the union. He continued to enjoy lengthy paid vacations until his death with a salary of MXN $41,203 (USD $2,100) per month. In 2019 he collected MXN $1,208,843 in salary, bonuses, Christmas bonuses, fees, and compensations. He also reported MXN $372,018 from investments and the sale of two vehicles, but he did not report the purchase or ownership of any real estate.
