= Luis Grajeda (basketball) =

Mexican basketball player (1937–2019)

Luis Grajeda (21 June 1937 – 15 January 2019) was a Mexican basketball player who competed in the 1964 Summer Olympics and in the 1968 Summer Olympics.

== Early life ==
He was born in Mexico City. With Mexico he played a World Cup edition (1963), two of the Olympic Games (1964 and 1968), in addition to the 1967 Panamerican Games in which he won the silver.
