= Judicial reform =

Political reform of a country's judiciary

Judicial reform is the complete or partial political reform of a country's judiciary. Judicial reform can be connected to a law reform, constitutional amendment, prison reform, police reform, or part of wider reform of the country's political system. Stated reasons for judicial reform include increasing of the independence of the judiciary, constitutionalism and separation of powers, increased speed of justice, increased fairness of justice, improved impartiality, and improving electoral accountability, political legitimacy, and parliamentary sovereignty. Areas of the judicial reform often include: codification of law instead of common law, changing between an inquisitorial system and an adversarial system, changes to court administration such as judicial councils or changes to appointment procedure, establishing mandatory retirement age for judges or increasing the independence of prosecutors from the executive.

== Africa ==
=== Judicial Reform Committee of South Sudan ===
The Judicial Reform Committee of South Sudan (JRC) was launched by the Government of South Sudan on 28 July 2022 to review laws, and to advise on judicial reforms and restructuring of the judiciary.

== Asia ==
=== Judiciary Reform Commission (Kyrgyzstan) ===
The Judiciary Reform Commission (KRSS) is a commission set up in Kyrgyzstan to examine the “basic directions of judiciary reform in the Kyrgyz Republic”, with a view to implement a reform package before 2016. The chairman of the group is Omurbek Tekebayev.

=== 2023 Israeli judicial reform ===
The 2023 Israeli judicial reform is a set of five changes to the judicial system and the balance of powers in Israel that were proposed in January 2023. The intent of the measures is to curb the judiciary's influence over lawmaking and public policy by limiting the Supreme Court's power to exercise judicial review, granting the government control over judicial appointments and limiting the authority of its legal advisors. The effort was led by Yariv Levin (Deputy Prime Minister and Minister of Justice) and Simcha Rothman (Chair of the Knesset's Constitution, Law and Justice Committee).

=== 2025 Israeli judicial reform ===
The 2025 Israeli judicial reform is a series of changes to the composition of the Judicial Selection Committee in Israel. The government proposed a broader set of similar laws in 2023, though it was struck down by the High Court of Israel.

== Europe ==
=== Administration of Justice Act ===
Administration of Justice Act (with its variations) is a stock short title used for legislation in the United Kingdom relating to the administration of justice. The Bill for an Act with this short title may have been known as a Administration of Justice Bill during its passage through Parliament. Administration of Justice Acts may be a generic name either for legislation bearing that short title or for all legislation which relates to procedural law.

=== Judicial reform of Alexander II ===
The judicial reform of Alexander II is generally considered one of the most successful and consistent of all his reforms (along with the military reform). A completely new court system and order of legal proceedings were established. The main results were the introduction of a unified judicial system instead of a cumbersome set of estates of the realm courts, and fundamental changes in criminal trials. The latter included the establishment of the principle of equality of the parties involved, the introduction of public hearings, the jury trial, and a professional advocate that had never existed in Russia. However, there were also problems, as certain obsolete institutions were not covered by the reform. Also, the reform was hindered by extrajudicial punishment, introduced on a widespread scale during the reigns of his successors – Alexander III and Nicholas II.

=== Romanian judicial reform ===
Recent decades have seen a surge in the birth of "supraterritorial institutions and associations", that have been gathered by their enactment of common law and practices. European Union's regional expansion into Southeastern Europe to include Romania is one such example. The community of European states has enacted treaties that have allowed them to unite politically and economically.

=== Constitutional Reform Act 2005 ===
The Constitutional Reform Act 2005 (c. 4) is an act of the Parliament of the United Kingdom, relevant to UK constitutional law. It provides for a Supreme Court of the United Kingdom to take over the previous appellate jurisdiction of the Law Lords as well as some powers of the Judicial Committee of the Privy Council, and removed the functions of Speaker of the House of Lords and Head of the Judiciary of England and Wales from the office of Lord Chancellor.

=== Scottish judicial reform ===
The period from 2012 to 2015 is the period of the Lord Presidency of Lord Gill whose agenda was to overhaul and modernise a failing judicial system. His initial Report dated from 2009, and followed a lengthy public consultation. His opinion was that the system as it stood was "outdated, expensive, unpredictable and inefficient." The principal statutory changes were contained in the Courts Reform (Scotland) Act 2014.

=== Judicial reform in Ukraine ===
The reform was launched in 2014 after the Revolution of Dignity and the 2014 Ukrainian presidential election. The purpose of the reform is to bring the judiciary of Ukraine to European standards and to ensure the protection of the rights, freedoms and legitimate interests of citizens through timely, effective and fair resolution of legal disputes on the basis of the rule of law.

=== Judicial Reform in Albania ===
Albania’s judicial reform was strongly pushed by the European Union as part of the country’s accession effort, with the aim of cleaning up a politicized and inefficient justice system. SPAK became its flagship anti-corruption institution, but the reform also exposed deep structural problems: vetting removed many judges and prosecutors, which improved integrity but also hollowed out the courts, created major backlogs, and slowed ordinary justice. The heavy use of pretrial detention has become another major concern, especially in high-profile cases such as Ilir Meta and Erion Veliaj, where critics argue it raises questions about proportionality, due process, and the broader direction of reform.

=== Protests against Polish judiciary reforms ===
Since 2017, a series of protests against judiciary reforms have occurred in Poland. Since Law and Justice took power in Poland in 2015, its influence rapidly extended to the judicial branch, through contended nominations that produced the 2015 Polish Constitutional Court crisis. The Law and Justice party argues that the reforms are needed to improve the efficiency of the judiciary, but the opposition, supported by a significant number of members of the judiciary, has been very critical of the reforms. The reforms have also been criticized by a number of international bodies. The European Commission invokes the Article 7 of the European Treaty against E.U. member Poland, denouncing recent judiciary reforms putting it under the political control of the ruling majority and citing "serious risk [to] the independence of the judiciary and the separation of powers".

== North America ==
=== Supreme Court reform in the United States ===
Debates over U.S. Supreme Court reform center on the tension between its powerful unelected role and democratic accountability. The Constitution leaves Congress broad authority to shape the Court’s structure—fueling recurring political and scholarly proposals to alter its size, tenure, and jurisdiction. As the only unelected branch of the federal government of the United States, the Supreme Court is the subject of heavy contention in public debate and has been since before the U.S. Constitution's drafting. The Supreme Court holds high importance in the American system as the final judicial check on both legislative and executive power.

The debates around reform hinge on the counter-majoritarian difficulty, a feature identified by legal scholar Alexander Bickel, of the U.S. governmental system in which one branch (the judiciary) can overrule the democratically implemented will of the majority. The Supreme Court's composition and structure is extremely fluid in nature. As laid out in Article Three of the U.S. Constitution, the only clear explanation of the Supreme Court is that "The judicial Power of the United States, shall be vested in one supreme Court". With this vague description of power, the U.S. Congress remains on charge of all specifics of the Court and its operation, with discretion over jurisdiction, number of justices, tenure of justices, etc. Congressional power over the Court warrants debate, as politicians often promise reform when running for office. The debate over Supreme Court reform is commented on in academic, judicial, executive, and legislative circles in the United States.

=== Judiciary Act of 1789 ===
The existence of a separate federal judiciary was controversial during the debates over the ratification of the Constitution. Anti-Federalists had denounced the judicial power as a potential instrument of national tyranny. Indeed, of the ten amendments that eventually became the Bill of Rights, five (the fourth through the eighth) dealt primarily with judicial proceedings. Even after ratification, some opponents of a strong judiciary urged that the federal court system be limited to only a Supreme Court and, perhaps, local admiralty judges. Congress, however, decided to establish a system of federal trial courts with broader jurisdiction, thereby creating an arm for enforcement of national laws within each state.

=== Judicial Procedures Reform Bill of 1937 ===
In the Judiciary Act of 1869, Congress had established that the Supreme Court would consist of the chief justice and eight associate justices. During Roosevelt's first term, the Supreme Court struck down several New Deal measures as being unconstitutional. Roosevelt sought to reverse this by changing the makeup of the court through the appointment of new additional justices who he hoped would rule that his legislative initiatives did not exceed the constitutional authority of the government. Since the U.S. Constitution does not define the Supreme Court's size, Roosevelt believed it was within the power of Congress to change it. Members of both parties viewed the legislation as an attempt to stack the court, and many Democrats, including Vice President John Nance Garner, opposed it. The bill came to be known as Roosevelt's "court-packing plan", a phrase coined by Edward Rumely.

=== 1960 Puerto Rican judicial reform referendum ===
A referendum on judicial reform was held in Puerto Rico on 8 November 1960. The changes were approved by 78% of voters.

=== 2024 Mexican judicial reform ===
The 2024 Mexican judicial reform is a series of constitutional amendments that restructured the judiciary of Mexico. The reform replaced Mexico's appointment-based system for selecting judges with one where judges, pre-selected by Congress, are elected by popular vote, with each judge serving a renewable nine-year term. It reduces the number of Supreme Court justices from 11 to 9 and limits their terms to 12 years. The reform also allows the use of "faceless" judges and establishes a new tribunal for judicial oversight and accountability, while significantly reducing benefits and salaries previously received by members of the judiciary. With the passing of the reform, Mexico became the first country to have elections for all judges.

The reform was put forward by the governing coalition, led by the National Regeneration Movement (Morena), with the goal of eliminating corruption in the judiciary. It faced significant resistance from opposition political parties, judicial workers, and international organizations, who argued that it threatened judicial independence. It sparked nationwide protests and strikes, even leading to the storming of the Senate on the day of the bill's vote.

== South America ==
=== Judicial reform in Peru under Alberto Fujimori ===
During the presidency of Alberto Fujimori from 1990 to 2000, the judiciary of Peru faced many reforms that the president enacted as a way to fulfill his campaign against terrorism. The reforms consisted of taking jurisdiction of terrorism cases away from civilian courts, changes in the structure of the court systems, and changes in the training of magistrates. These changes were implemented with popular support; however, they also received much criticism from the legal establishment and the international community.

== See also ==
- Constitutional economics
- Criminal justice reform
- Electoral reform
- Government failure
- Judicial activism
- Judicial independence
- Judicial interpretation
- Judicial review
- Political corruption
- Regulatory capture
- Rule according to higher law
- Rule of law
- Security sector governance and reform
- Category:United States federal judiciary legislation
