= 2025 Mexican judicial elections =

- 1 June 2025

9 Supreme Court justices 5 members of the Judicial Disciplinary Tribunal 464 circuit court magistrates 386 district court judges 2 magistrates of the Superior Chamber of the Electoral Tribunal of the Federal Judiciary 15 magistrates of the Regional Chambers of the Electoral Tribunal of the Federal Judiciary
- Turnout: 13.02%

The 2025 Mexican judicial elections were held on 1 June 2025, during which voters elected various members of the federal judiciary. This marked the first judicial election in Mexican history, and it is considered the first instance in the world in which all national judges were elected by popular vote. These elections took place concurrently with local elections in Durango and Veracruz.

Voters elected nine Supreme Court justices, two magistrates of the Superior Chamber and 15 magistrates of the Regional Chambers of the Electoral Tribunal of the Federal Judiciary, five members of the newly established Judicial Disciplinary Tribunal, 464 circuit court magistrates, and 386 district court judges.

The National Regeneration Movement (Morena), the ruling party, secured a dominant share of seats across key federal courts, including the Supreme Court, the Judicial Disciplinary Tribunal, and the Electoral Tribunal of the Federal Judiciary, raising concerns about potential erosion of judicial independence of people. The election was notable for its historically low voter turnout—approximately 13%—the lowest in the country's democratic history. The number of invalid and blank ballots also reached a record high, surpassing 20 percent of the total votes cast and, in some cases, exceeding the number of votes received by leading candidates. Several international observers criticized the political process as complex and susceptible to political influence.

== Background ==
=== Judicial reform ===
Following the 2024 Mexican general election, the Sigamos Haciendo Historia coalition—formed by the National Regeneration Movement (Morena), the Labor Party (PT), and the Ecologist Green Party of Mexico (PVEM)—secured a supermajority in the Chamber of Deputies and came three seats short in the Senate. The alliance, along with its presidential candidate Claudia Sheinbaum, campaigned on enacting a package of constitutional reforms known as "Plan C." One of its key proposals was the popular election of the federal judiciary, which outgoing president Andrés Manuel López Obrador claimed would eliminate corruption.

On 1 September 2024, the bill was introduced in the LXVI Legislature of the Mexican Congress, triggering nationwide protests and strikes over concerns that it would undermine judicial independence. Despite opposition, it passed the Senate on 11 September and was promulgated by López Obrador on 15 September.

The reform replaced the country's appointment-based system for selecting judges with one where judges, pre-selected by Congress, are elected by popular vote, with each judge serving a renewable nine-year term. It reduced the number of Supreme Court justices from eleven to nine and limited their terms to twelve years. It also replaced the Federal Judiciary Council with the Judicial Disciplinary Tribunal. A subsequent law set the election date for 1 June 2025.

== Electoral system ==
The National Electoral Institute (INE) oversees federal elections in Mexico. Its responsibilities include organizing election day logistics, producing and distributing electoral materials, counting votes, and certifying the election results.

Voters must present their voter identification at polling stations to cast their ballots. For voters with physical disabilities or limitations, electoral materials were delivered directly to their residences. Unlike the 2024 Mexican general election, individuals in preventive detention and citizens residing abroad were excluded from voting in the judicial elections. The exclusion of detainees was attributed to budgetary constraints.

=== Judicial election ===
All judicial positions are elected by plurality voting. Members of the Supreme Court are elected for a single twelve-year term, members of the Electoral Tribunal of the Federal Judiciary for single six-year terms, and members of the Judicial Disciplinary Tribunal for single six-year terms. Circuit court magistrates and district court judges are elected for nine-year terms, with the possibility of a single consecutive reelection.

Article 96 of the Constitution mandates that each branch of government establish an evaluation committee composed of five jurists. These committees are responsible for assessing and filtering prospective candidates, who may choose the branch they wish to register under. Each committee is tasked with selecting a third of the candidates for each position up for election. Candidates must be submitted to the INE by 12 February.

=== Ballots ===
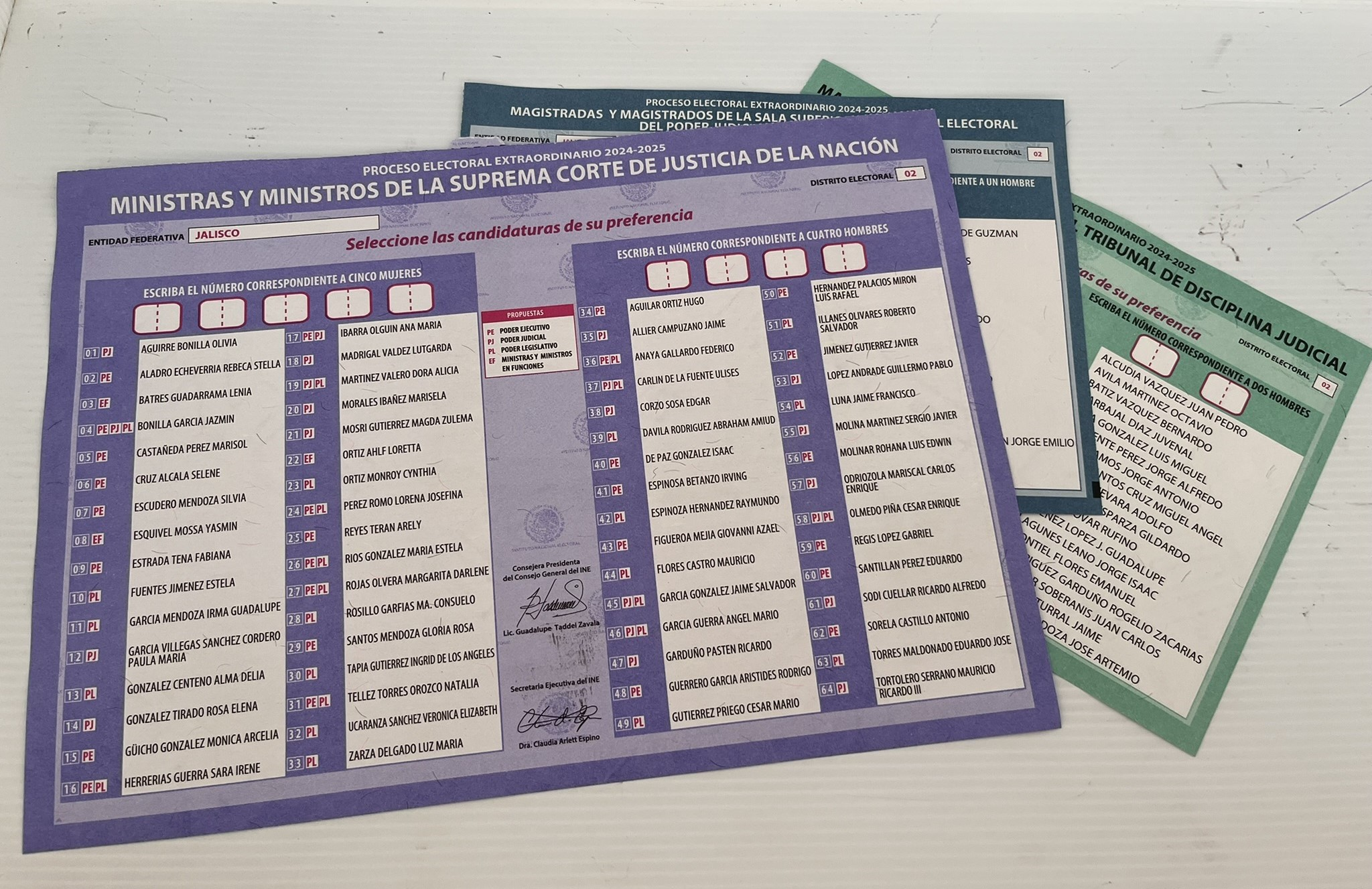
Three of the ballots used during the elections. The top ballot was used for the election of Supreme Court justices.

The election is conducted across six separate ballots, one for each office. Each ballot displays two lists—women on one side and men on the other—listing every candidate's number, nominating branch and, where relevant, legal specialization. Voters mark their choices by writing the candidate numbers in designated boxes; boxes are color-coded when a specialization applies.

=== Judicial electoral districts ===
For the purpose of electing circuit court magistrates and district court judges, a total of 60 judicial electoral districts were established, distributed across Mexico’s 32 judicial circuits. Due to variations in the number of judicial positions among states, 17 judicial circuits are composed of only one judicial electoral district, while the remaining 15 circuits are divided into two or more districts.

== Candidate selection ==
=== Selection of judicial offices ===
On 12 October 2024, the Senate conducted a lottery to determine the offices up for election. The draw resulted in 464 circuit court magistrates and 386 district court judges holding odd-numbered positions being selected for the election. The remaining offices will be elected in 2027.

=== Evaluation committees ===
On 31 October 2024, each branch of government revealed the jurists selected to form their respective evaluation committees. The executive branch received 18,447 applications, the legislative branch received 11,904, and the judicial branch received 3,805. After assessing each applicant's suitability, the executive branch shortlisted 11,015 candidates, the legislative branch 7,060, and the judicial branch 1,046.

On 7 January 2025, the judicial branch's evaluation committee suspended its activities after a judge granted a constitutional injunction (amparo) ordering a halt to the implementation of the judicial reform. On 22 January, the Electoral Tribunal of the Federal Judiciary (TEPJF) ruled that amparos could not be applied to electoral processes and ordered the committee to resume its functions. The committee refused to comply, prompting the TEPJF to instruct the Senate to proceed with the selection of the judicial branch's candidates via sortition. On 28 January, all members of the judicial branch's committee resigned, and two days later, the Senate selected the committee's candidates.

On 12 February 2025, the Senate submitted the final list of candidates to the INE, comprising 1,410 nominees from the executive branch, 1,416 from the legislative branch, and 955 from the judicial branch.

Members of the evaluation committees
Executive branch	Legislative branch	Judicial branch (Note: On 28 January 2025, all members of the evaluation committee resigned.)
Arturo Zaldívar Lelo de Larrea	Maday Merino Damián	Mónica González Contró
Mary Cruz Cortés Ornelas	Maribel Concepción Méndez De Lara	Emma Meza Fonseca
Javier Quijano Baz	Ana Patricia Briseño Torres	Emilia Molina de la Fuente
Vanessa Romero Rocha	Andrés Norberto García Repper Favila	Wilfrido Castañón León
Isabel Inés Romero Cruz	María Gabriela Sánchez García	Luis Enrique Perea Trejo

== Conduct ==
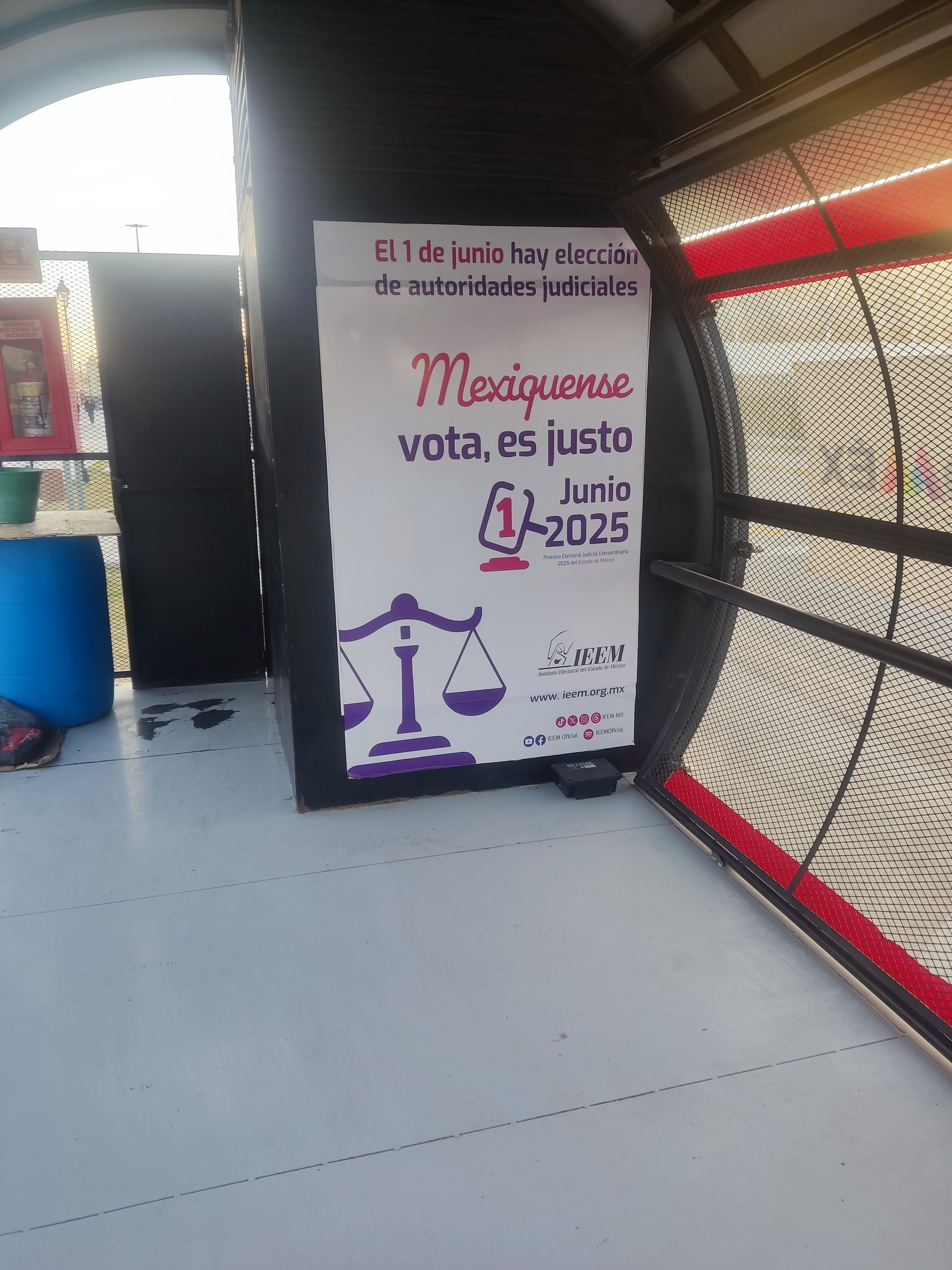
An advertisement promoting the elections in a bus station

The official campaign period began on 30 March 2025 and concluded on 28 May, followed by a period of electoral silence until election day.

From 12 to 21 May, early voting was held for voters with disabilities or limited physical mobility. According to the National Electoral Institute (INE), 5,536 out of 5,580 envelopes containing votes were successfully collected during this period.

=== Polling stations ===
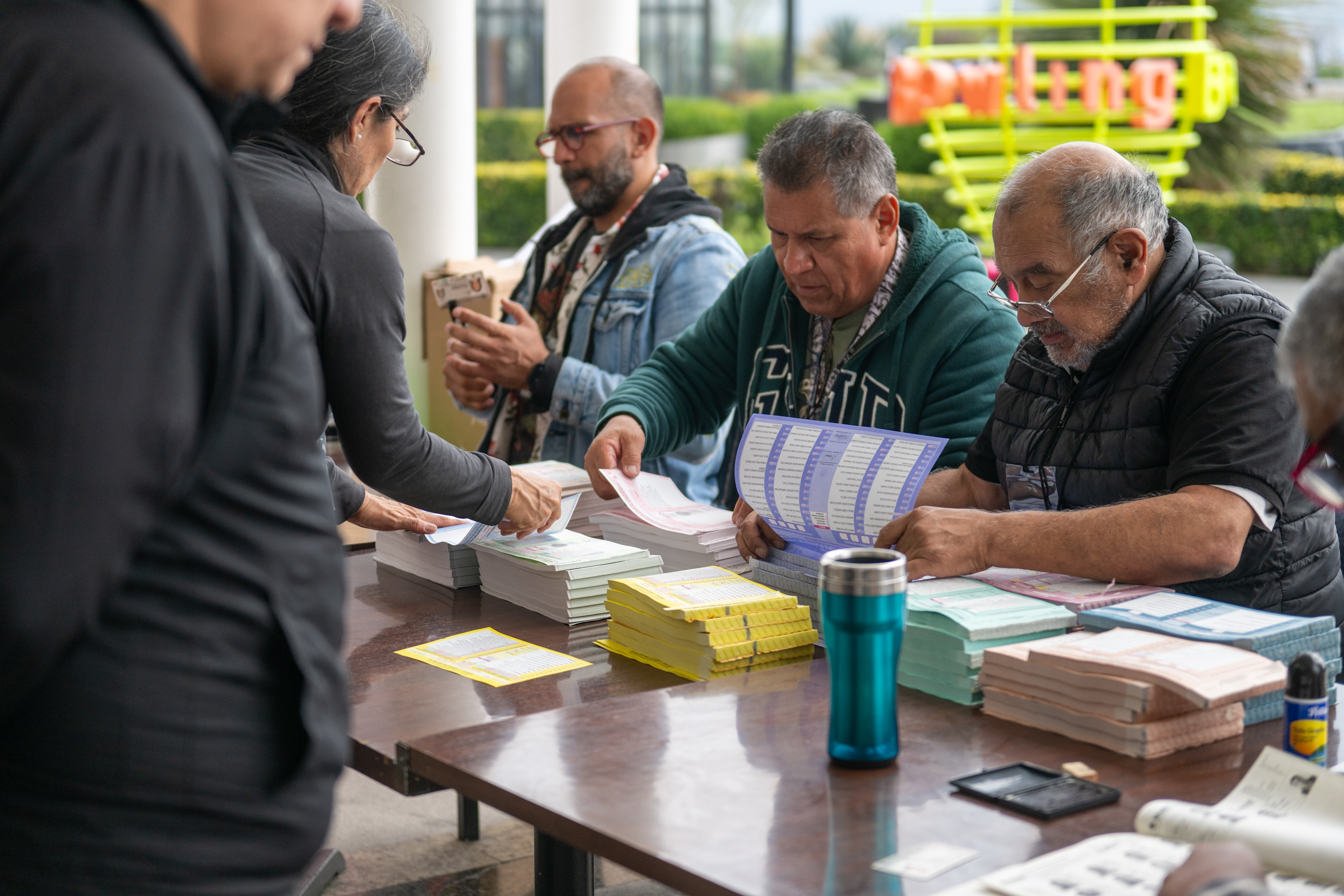
Poll workers distributing ballots to voters at a polling station

There were 84,021 polling stations approved to be installed nationwide.

=== Political interference ===
In some states, local government officials were reported to have distributed partisan cheat sheets that promoted specific judicial candidates. While the use of such materials is not illegal in itself, it is unlawful for political parties or public officials to disseminate them. The INE referred two cases to the Attorney General's Office: one in Nuevo León involving Citizens' Movement, and another in Álvaro Obregón, Mexico City, involving the National Regeneration Movement (Morena).

The INE considered the number of people registered as election observers—over 317,000—unusual. More than 38,000 applications were rejected due to political affiliation, including over 20,000 linked to Morena. INE councilor Jaime Rivera Velázquez expressed hope that the interest was genuine and not driven by coercion or an attempt to monitor voters. By contrast, the 2024 Mexican general election received only 34,000 applications for observer status.

=== Result reporting ===
The INE announced that it would not implement the Preliminary Electoral Results Program (PREP)—a system used in previous elections to provide early results by counting ballots at the precinct level. Instead, precincts would only count the number of ballots cast, and actual vote counting would begin once the ballots arrived at district offices. The official count was scheduled to take place between 1 and 10 June, and the INE had up to 12 days from election day to report the final results.

Additionally, for the first time in 34 years, citizens would not participate in vote counting at polling stations, a departure from previous practices that raised concerns about transparency and electoral oversight.

== Results ==
Approximately 13 million voters participated in each race, resulting in a turnout of about 13 percent—a record low for a federal election in Mexico. The number of invalid and blank ballots also reached a record high, surpassing 20 percent of the total votes cast and, in some cases, exceeding the number of votes received by the leading candidates.

In the Supreme Court race, Hugo Aguilar Ortiz received the highest number of votes, securing the presidency of the Supreme Court for the 2025–2027 term. All three incumbent justices seeking reelection—Lenia Batres, Yasmín Esquivel Mossa, and Loretta Ortiz Ahlf—were re-elected, finishing in second through fourth place, respectively.

=== Supreme Court ===
The nine Supreme Court seats up for election were divided between five designated for women and four for men. Each voter was entitled to cast nine votes, corresponding to the number of available seats.

Candidate	Votes	%
✓ Hugo Aguilar Ortiz	6,195,612	5.31
✓ Lenia Batres Guadarrama	5,802,019	4.97
✓ Yasmín Esquivel Mossa	5,310,993	4.55
✓ Loretta Ortiz Ahlf	5,012,094	4.30
✓ María Estela Ríos González	4,729,803	4.05
✓ Giovanni Azael Figueroa Mejía	3,655,748	3.13
✓ Irving Espinosa Betanzo	3,587,951	3.07
✓ Arístides Rodrigo Guerrero García	3,584,825	3.07
✓ Sara Irene Herrerías Guerra	3,268,411	2.80
Isaac de Paz González	2,821,710	2.42
Federico Anaya Gallardo	2,576,308	2.21
César Mario Gutiérrez Priego	2,442,005	2.09
Natalia Téllez Torres Orozco	2,303,018	1.97
Fabiana Estrada Tena	1,814,574	1.56
Marisol Castañeda Pérez	1,664,026	1.43
Selene Cruz Alcalá	1,510,547	1.29
Rebeca Stella Aladro Echeverría	1,467,672	1.26
Olivia Aguirre Bonilla	1,438,399	1.23
Jazmín Bonilla García	1,407,632	1.21
Paula María García Villegas Sánchez Cordero	1,388,454	1.19
Ana María Ibarra Olguín	1,229,546	1.05
Silvia Escudero Mendoza	1,180,577	1.01
Estela Fuentes Jiménez	1,082,812	0.93
Sergio Javier Molina Martínez	1,079,665	0.93
Arely Reyes Terán	920,024	0.79
Mónica Arcelia Güicho González	907,626	0.78
Raymundo Espinoza Hernández	888,074	0.76
Irma Guadalupe García Mendoza	850,806	0.73
Marisela Morales Ibañez	839,116	0.72
Edgar Corzo Sosa	832,302	0.71
Ulises Carlin de la Fuente	814,000	0.70
Alma Delia González Centeno	792,711	0.68
Rosa Elena González Tirado	767,251	0.66
Jaime Allier Campuzano	731,684	0.63
Dora Martínez Valero	693,310	0.59
Luis Rafael Hernández Palacios Mirón	681,266	0.58
Ángel Mario García Guerra	679,559	0.58
Mauricio Flores Castro	666,680	0.57
Jaime Salvador García González	637,395	0.55
Javier Jiménez Gutiérrez	630,077	0.54
Luz María Zarza Delgado	627,445	0.54
Magda Zulema Mosri Gutiérrez	613,469	0.53
Eduardo Santillán Pérez	612,429	0.52
Abraham Amiud Dávila Rodríguez	601,005	0.52
Ricardo Alfredo Sodi Cuéllar	596,075	0.51
Gloria Rosa Santos Mendoza	573,864	0.49
Ricardo Garduño Pastén	524,859	0.45
Lorena Josefina Pérez Romo	511,566	0.44
César Enrique Olmedo Piña	506,574	0.43
Cynthia Ortiz Monroy	470,156	0.40
Mauricio Ricardo III Tortolero Serrano	452,101	0.39
Antonio Sorela Castillo	438,861	0.38
Guillermo Pablo López Andrade	420,414	0.36
Carlos Enrique Odriozola Mariscal	417,533	0.36
Eduardo José Torres Maldonado	416,894	0.36
Francisco Luna Jaime	415,144	0.36
Margarita Darlene Rojas Olvera	404,908	0.35
Lutgarda Madrigal Valdez	401,727	0.34
Gabriel Regis López	388,171	0.33
Luis Edwin Molinar Rohana	385,485	0.33
Roberto Salvador Illanes Olivares	382,988	0.33
Ingrid de los Ángeles Tapia Gutiérrez	369,923	0.32
Ma. Consuelo Rosillo Garfias	323,989	0.28
Verónica Elizabeth Ucaranza Sánchez	290,056	0.25
Blank votes	14,054,064	12.04
Invalid votes	12,604,157	10.80
Total	116,690,139	100.00
Total votes	12,965,574	–
Registered voters/turnout	99,594,010	13.02
Source: INE

=== Judicial Disciplinary Council ===
The five Judicial Disciplinary Council seats up for election were divided between three designated for women and two for men. Each voter was entitled to cast five votes, corresponding to the number of available seats.

Candidate	Votes	%
✓ Celia Maya García	5,233,666	8.09
✓ Eva Verónica De Gyves Zárate	5,034,872	7.78
✓ Bernardo Bátiz Vázquez	4,652,720	7.19
✓ Indira Isabel García Pérez	4,346,396	6.72
✓ Rufino H. León Tovar	4,032,446	6.23
Ariadna Camacho Contreras	2,146,441	3.32
Denisse De Los Ángeles Uribe Obregón	1,508,711	2.33
Liliana Hernández Hernández	1,250,128	1.93
Jorge Alfredo Clemente Pérez	1,209,232	1.87
Blanca Alicia Ochoa Hernández	1,188,428	1.84
Gildardo Galinzoga Esparza	1,141,279	1.76
Miguel Ángel De Los Santos Cruz	1,126,563	1.74
Verónica Patricia Gómez Schulz	1,043,764	1.61
Abigail Díaz De León Benard	1,040,403	1.61
Juan Pedro Alcudia Vázquez	1,003,340	1.55
Anabel Gordillo Argüello	998,167	1.54
Fany Lorena Jiménez Aguirre	990,746	1.53
Mónica Sánchez Castillo	944,843	1.46
José Artemio Zúñiga Mendoza	938,478	1.45
Jazmín Gabriela Rivera Reyes	814,795	1.26
Juvenal Carbajal Díaz	806,849	1.25
Octavio Ávila Martínez	757,629	1.17
Hasuba Villa Bedolla	755,029	1.17
María Isabel Rojas Letechipía	704,549	1.09
Jorge Antonio Cruz Ramos	611,145	0.94
María Elisa Vera Madrigal	572,436	0.88
Jaime Santana Turral	572,035	0.88
Luis Miguel Ceja González	568,375	0.88
Yolanda Otero García	561,845	0.87
Ma. Belén Reyes Oropeza	546,417	0.84
Martha Beatriz Pinedo Corrales	520,260	0.80
Rosa María Salinas Silva	471,708	0.73
Adolfo Franco Guevara	456,530	0.71
Jorge Isaac Lagunes Leano	441,038	0.68
J. Guadalupe Jiménez López	435,434	0.67
Emanuel Montiel Flores	413,764	0.64
Juan Carlos Salazar Soberanis	326,789	0.51
Rogelio Zacarías Rodríguez Garduño	305,359	0.47
Blank votes	6,986,730	10.80
Invalid votes	7,242,961	11.19
Total	64,702,300	100.00
Source: INE

=== Superior Chamber of the Electoral Tribunal of the Federal Judiciary ===
The two seats on the Superior Chamber of the Electoral Tribunal of the Federal Judiciary up for election were divided equally, with one seat designated for a woman and one for a man. Each voter was entitled to cast two votes, corresponding to the number of available seats.

Candidate	Votes	%
✓ Gilberto De Guzmán Batiz García	4,748,915	18.37
✓ Claudia Valle Aguilasocho	4,203,694	16.26
Concepción María Del Rocío Balderas Fernández	1,893,535	7.32
Gabriela Eugenia Del Valle Pérez	1,629,749	6.30
Adriana Margarita Favela Herrera	1,094,162	4.23
Sandra Pérez Cruz	1,057,586	4.09
Rodrigo Quezada Goncén	1,020,905	3.95
Jorge Sánchez Morales	780,757	3.02
Rubén Jesús Lara Patrón	763,832	2.95
Dulce Magalli Ramírez García	700,024	2.71
Armando Hernández Cruz	678,495	2.62
Enrique Figueroa Ávila	662,245	2.56
Luis Espíndola Morales	584,192	2.26
Jorge Emilio Sánchez Cordero Grossmann	520,951	2.02
César Lorenzo Wong Meraz	439,442	1.70
Blank votes	1,990,301	7.70
Invalid votes	3,082,415	11.92
Total	25,851,200	100.00
Source: INE

== Aftermath ==
=== Election night ===
Following the closing of polls, leaders of the National Regeneration Movement (Morena), including party president Luisa María Alcalde Luján and Senate President Gerardo Fernández Noroña, described the election as a historic success, emphasizing that it marked the first time the Mexican public had directly elected members of the judiciary. Fernández Noroña downplayed concerns about turnout, stating that the significance lay not in the number of people who voted but in the fact that citizens had the opportunity to elect members of the judiciary.

Alejandro Moreno Cárdenas, president of the Institutional Revolutionary Party (PRI), and Jorge Romero Herrera, president of the National Action Party (PAN), denounced the presence of voting guides and cheat sheets at polling stations and pointed to low turnout, describing the election as a simulation designed to benefit Morena. Romero Herrara announced that the PAN would seek to reverse the judicial reform to prevent the 2027 judicial elections, investigate the elected judges for possible ties to organized crime or Morena, and report alleged irregularities to international organizations.

At 11:00 p.m. CST on 1 June, INE president Guadalupe Taddei announced that, according to preliminary estimates, voter turnout was approximately 13%. In an online address following the INE's statement, President Claudia Sheinbaum described the election as "a complete success," declaring that "Mexico is the most democratic country in the world."

=== Legal challenges ===
On 16 June 2025, members of the Institutional Revolutionary Party (PRI) filed a formal appeal challenging the judicial election, citing alleged ballot stuffing, mass distribution of voting cheat sheets ("acordeones"), and the improper use of federal funds, and requested the annulment of the election.

On 21 July 2025, the civil society Somos México (also known as Marea rosa) submitted an amicus curiae to the Electoral Tribunal of the Federal Judiciary (TEPJF) seeking the annulment of the election. The document presented evidence of alleged irregularities, including mass distribution of cheat sheets, irregular handling of electoral packages, absence of polling station representatives, and alleged ballot stuffing.

In August 2025, the TEPJF ruled by a 3–2 majority that there was insufficient evidence to annul the election. Presiding Magistrate Mónica Soto and Magistrates Felipe Fuentes and Felipe de la Mata concluded that the allegations were speculative. Magistrates Reyes Rodríguez and Janine Otálora dissented, arguing that the distribution of such materials had been widespread and could have influenced the outcome.

== Criticism ==
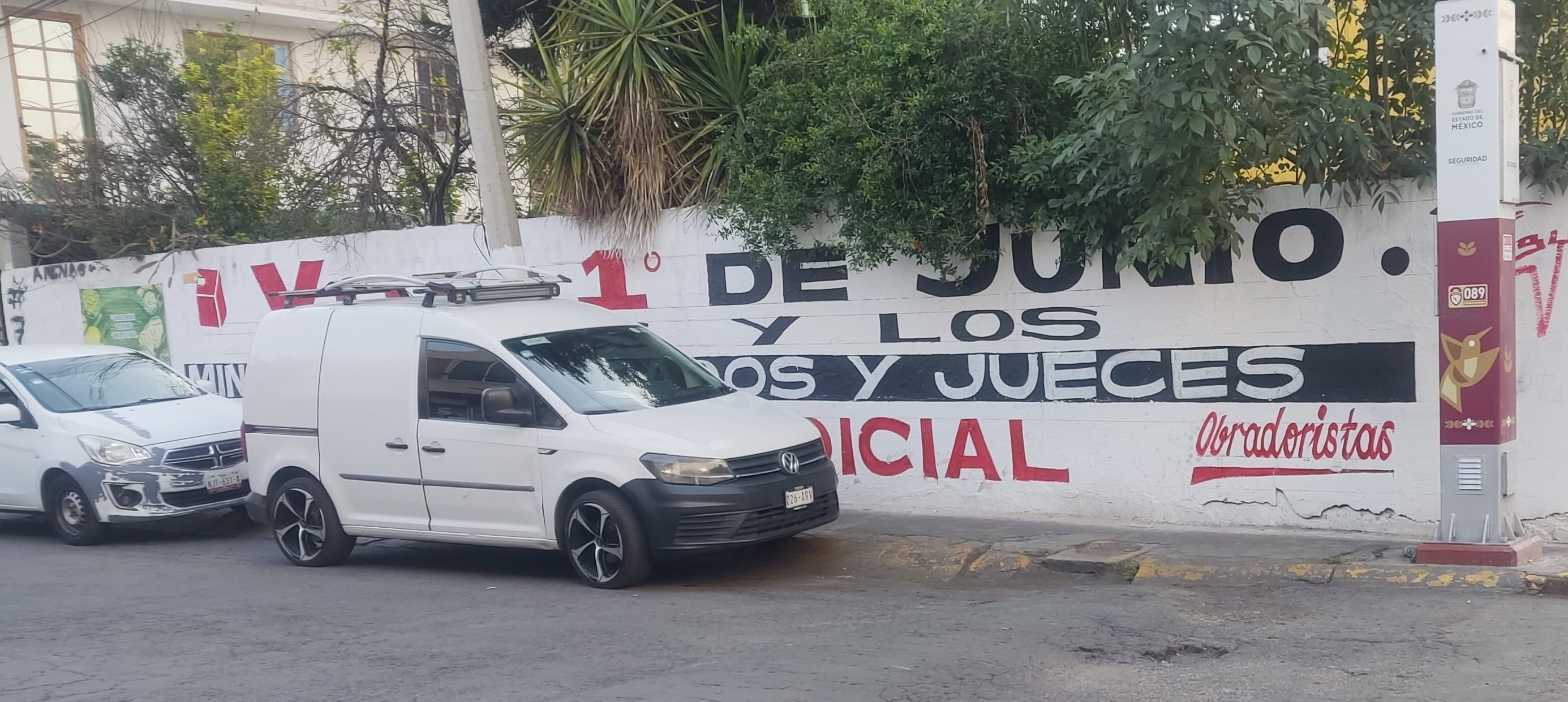
An advert promoting a vote for Obradorist (pro-López Obrador) judges

The process has drawn criticism from politicians and political analysts, with some describing it as a step toward democratic backsliding. This is compounded by concerns that it could potentially allow partial judges or judges with ties to organized crime to be elected.

=== Issues in the candidate selection process ===
In October 2024, the Congress of the Union established its evaluation committee to oversee the selection of judicial candidates. The committee's jurists were recommended solely by the National Regeneration Movement (Morena), the Ecologist Green Party of Mexico (PVEM), and the Labor Party (PT), with opposition parties boycotting the selection process in protest of the judicial reform. Additionally, many criticized the legislative branch's use of sortition for selecting judicial candidates.

Following their selection, several candidates requested to appear on the ballot with nicknames such as "AMLO's Judge," "Judge of the Fourth Transformation," or "The People's Minister," proposals that were ultimately rejected. Twenty candidates were identified as having criminal records, ties to defending drug traffickers, or allegations of corruption.

In some states, ballots featured only one candidate per position. In Durango, for example, the local judicial elections featured 49 candidates for 49 seats, with the state's three evaluation committees jointly selecting a single nominee for each position. Critics described the state's process as undemocratic and a waste of public resources, arguing that the outcome was predetermined.

=== Boycott ===
On 15 May 2025, billionaire Ricardo Salinas Pliego urged his followers on X to boycott the election, claiming that Morena's supermajority in the LXVI Legislature had been fraudulently obtained and that participating in the vote would only legitimize what he likened to a "coup d'état". The next day, former president Vicente Fox called for a boycott, describing the election as a "farce" and urging citizens to abstain from voting.

Members and legislators from the National Action Party (PAN) and the Institutional Revolutionary Party (PRI) similarly called on citizens to refrain from voting. Some civil associations, such as SomosMX—comprising former members of Marea Rosa, the Frente Cívico Nacional, and the defunct Party of the Democratic Revolution (PRD)—encouraged citizens to register as electoral observers in order to monitor for potential irregularities or fraud.

On election day, civil associations and social media organizers held a protest at 11:00 a.m., beginning at the Angel of Independence and ending at the Monumento a la Revolución in Mexico City. Demonstrators protested against the judicial reform, the ruling party Morena, and what they described as low voter turnout, referring to the day as "Black Sunday". Protesters also called for the resignation of INE president Guadalupe Taddei Zavala.

=== Public opinion ===
A Pew Research Center survey published a week before the election found that 66% of Mexicans approved the judicial reform, while 29% disapproved.
