= Alberto Pérez =

Alberto Pérez may refer to:

== People ==
- Alberto Pérez Pérez (1937–2017), Uruguayan law scholar
- Alberto Pérez Zabala (1925–2014), Spanish footballer
- Alberto Pérez-Gómez (born 1949), Mexican architectural historian
- Alberto Pérez (musician) (born 1950), Spanish singer, composer, guitarist and music producer
- Alberto Pérez Dayán (born 1960), Mexican Supreme Court judge
- Beto Pérez (born 1970), Colombian dancer
- Alberto Pérez Jiménez (1975–2009), Mexican professional wrestler, billed as "La Parkita"

== Places ==
- Estadio Alberto Pérez Navarro, football stadium in Mexico
