= 2025 Mexican local elections =

- 1 June 2025

251 municipalities

The 2025 Mexican local elections were held on 1 June 2025, during which voters elected officials for 251 municipalities in Durango and Veracruz. In addition, local judicial elections were conducted in 17 states as part of local judicial reforms that stemmed from the 2024 Mexican judicial reform. These local elections were held concurrently with the federal judicial elections.

== Electoral system ==
=== Municipal elections ===
According to Article 115 of the Mexican Constitution, municipalities in each state hold elections to elect municipal presidents and councilors. Municipal presidents are elected through a single-round, first-past-the-post system. Term lengths vary by state, though municipal presidents typically serve three-year terms, with the possibility of one consecutive re-election. The registration of candidates and oversight of campaigns are managed by the National Electoral Institute (INE) at the federal level, in coordination with State Electoral Institutes at the state level. Swearing-in dates for municipal authorities vary by state and are determined by each state’s constitution.

== Durango ==
=== 2025 Durango municipal elections ===
All positions of Durango's 39 municipalities were up for election.

On 14 January 2025, the National Regeneration Movement (MORENA), the Ecologist Green Party of Mexico (PVEM), and the Labor Party (PT) announced the Sigamos Haciendo Historia en Durango coalition. The National Action Party (PAN) and the Institutional Revolutionary Party (PRI) formed the Unidad y Grandeza coalition, fielding common candidates in 34 municipalities. Citizens' Movement (MC), as well as three local parties, participated without coalition support.

The Unidad y Grandeza coalition secured 20 municipalities, an increase of two compared to 2022, largely retaining control of the capital. The Sigamos Haciendo Historia en Durango coalition, whose goal was to control more than half of the state's municipalities, lost four municipalities, totaling 16. At the party level, PRI and MORENA were nearly tied in total votes. In specific races, PRI retained control of Lerdo, PAN held onto Durango, while Morena flipped Gómez Palacio. Notably, in both Durango and Gómez Palacio, the state’s two most populous municipalities, MC emerged as a competitive force, placing second in both races.

Party	Votes	%	Seats
Institutional Revolutionary Party	154,508	26.75	13
National Regeneration Movement	147,897	25.61	12
Citizens' Movement	103,290	17.89	3
National Action Party	101,832	17.63	7
Ecologist Green Party of Mexico	26,039	4.51	2
Labor Party	24,058	4.17	2
Partido Estatal Renovación	8,289	1.44	0
Solidarity Encounter Party Durango	4,877	0.84	0
Partido Villista	3,772	0.65	0
Independent	2,648	0.46	0
Non-registered candidates	298	0.05	0
Total	577,508	100.00	39
Valid votes	577,508	96.94	
Invalid/blank votes	18,253	3.06	
Total votes	595,761	100.00	
Registered voters/turnout	1,327,669	44.87	
Source: PREP Durango, IEPC Durango

== Veracruz ==
=== 2025 Veracruz municipal elections ===
All positions of Veracruz's 212 municipalities were up for election. Elected officials will begin their four-year terms on 1 January 2026.

On 29 January 2025, the National Regeneration Movement (MORENA), the Ecologist Green Party of Mexico (PVEM), and the Labor Party (PT) announced the Sigamos Haciendo Historia en Veracruz coalition. However, due to disagreements among party leaders over the distribution of candidacies, the PT withdrew from the alliance on 3 February. Additionally, the National Action Party (PAN) and the Institutional Revolutionary Party (PRI) ended their four-year alliance in the state, also citing disputes over the allocation of candidacies. Citizens' Movement (MC) participated without coalition support.

The campaign period was marred by violence against candidates, including the deaths of seven individuals, two of whom were candidates. Between November 2024 and May 2025, up to 170 candidates reported receiving threats or being victims of attacks.

The Sigamos Haciendo Historia en Veracruz coalition lost ground in the election, losing control of the municipalities of Poza Rica and Papantla, but gained the former PAN strongholds of Tantoyuca and Veracruz. The elections also marked gains for MC and PT; MC increased its vote share and number of municipalities won, becoming the party with the second-highest number of municipalities and votes, while the PT also expanded its vote share and municipal victories despite running independently of its usual coalition partners. The PAN and PRI likewise recorded gains in municipal races.

Party	Votes	%	Seats
National Regeneration Movement	963,345	32.53	60
Citizens' Movement	583,569	19.71	41
National Action Party	415,797	14.04	34
Labor Party	385,314	13.01	28
Institutional Revolutionary Party	337,949	11.41	23
Ecologist Green Party of Mexico	241,555	8.16	24
Independent	26,621	0.90	1
Non-registered candidates	6,801	0.23	0
Total	2,960,951	100.00	211
Valid votes	2,960,951	97.04	
Invalid/blank votes	90,465	2.96	
Total votes	3,051,416	100.00	
Registered voters/turnout	6,115,245	49.90	
Source: OPLE Veracruz
