= 2024 Mexican judicial reform =

Mexican constitutional amendments

Congress of the Union
- Long title: A decree to amend, add, and repeal various provisions of the Political Constitution of the United Mexican States, regarding the reform of the Judicial Branch.
- Citation: Decreto por el que se reforman, adicionan y derogan diversas disposiciones de la Constitución Política de los Estados Unidos Mexicanos, en materia de reforma del Poder Judicial Diario Oficial de la Federación, 15 September 2024.
- Enacted by: Chamber of Deputies
- Enacted by: Senate
- Signed by: Andrés Manuel López Obrador
- Signed: 15 September 2024
- Effective: 16 September 2024

Legislative history

Initiating chamber: Chamber of Deputies
- First reading: 1 September 2024
- Passed: 4 September 2024
- Voting summary: 357 voted for; 130 voted against; 13 absent

Revising chamber: Senate
- First reading: 10 September 2024
- Passed: 11 September 2024
- Voting summary: 86 voted for; 41 voted against; 1 absent

Amends
- Constitution of Mexico
- Status: In force

The 2024 Mexican judicial reform is a series of constitutional amendments that restructured the judiciary of Mexico. The reform replaced Mexico's appointment-based system for selecting judges with one where judges, pre-selected by Congress, are elected by popular vote, with each judge serving a renewable nine-year term. It reduces the number of Supreme Court justices from 11 to 9 and limits their terms to 12 years. The reform also allows the use of "faceless" judges and establishes a new tribunal for judicial oversight and accountability, while significantly reducing benefits and salaries previously received by members of the judiciary. With the passing of the reform, Mexico became the first country to have elections for all judges.

The reform was put forward by the governing coalition, led by the National Regeneration Movement (Morena), with the goal of eliminating corruption in the judiciary. It faced significant resistance from opposition political parties, judicial workers, and international organizations, who argued that it threatened judicial independence. It sparked nationwide protests and strikes, even leading to the storming of the Senate on the day of the bill's vote.

The amendments secured the required two-thirds majority in Congress and were then ratified by a majority of state legislatures in record time. It was promulgated by outgoing president Andrés Manuel López Obrador on 15 September.

== Background ==
During his presidency, Andrés Manuel López Obrador frequently clashed with the judiciary, accusing it of obstructing his government by granting constitutional relief injunctions (amparos) that delayed his infrastructure projects, such as the Tren Maya, often halting tree felling. López Obrador claimed the judiciary was controlled by a minority, complicit in white-collar crime, and influenced by external actors. On 1 September 2023, he announced plans to pursue judicial reform aimed at eliminating conflicts of interest and corruption, proposing that judges be elected by popular vote.

On 5 February 2024, López Obrador introduced a package of constitutional reforms known as "Plan C", among them a reform to the country's judiciary. As a constitutional amendment, the reform required approval by a two-thirds majority in both chambers of Congress.

During the 2024 general election, Claudia Sheinbaum campaigned on passing López Obrador's "Plan C", including the judicial reform, if her coalition secured a supermajority in Congress. Her coalition, Sigamos Haciendo Historia—comprising the National Regeneration Movement (Morena), the Labor Party (PT), and the Ecologist Green Party of Mexico (PVEM)—won a supermajority in the Chamber of Deputies with 364 of 500 seats. In the Senate, they fell three seats short of a supermajority, holding 83 out of 128 seats. On 28 August, defections by the two senators elected for the Party of the Democratic Revolution (PRD) reduced the shortfall to just one seat.

Shortly after winning the election, president-elect Sheinbaum committed to prioritizing the judicial reform. Between 14 and 16 June 2024, three opinion polls conducted by De las Heras, Enkoll, and Morena showed that around 80% of respondents supported the reforms, although only half of those polled were previously aware of the proposal. From 27 June to 8 August, Sheinbaum and Morena legislators agreed to hold nine discussion forums, each focusing on a different aspect of the reform package.

== Legislative history ==
=== Chamber of Deputies ===
During the final days of the LXV Legislature of the Congress of the Union, the judicial reform was introduced to the Constitutional Points Commission of the Chamber of Deputies. On 26 August 2024, the commission voted along party lines to send the reform to the full Chamber of Deputies, with 22 in favor and 16 against.

On 31 August, a judge granted an amparo to striking court employees and judges, blocking discussion or voting on the reform in Congress.

On 1 September, at the start of the LXVI Legislature, the first reading of the reform took place. The PRI parliamentary group, led by Rubén Moreira, left the chamber, claiming the reading was illegal due to an active amparo. Ricardo Monreal, the coordinator of the Morena parliamentary group, defended the reading, arguing that amparos do not apply to constitutional reforms.

On 3 September, the reform was scheduled to be discussed at the Legislative Palace of San Lázaro. Due to protests by court employees and students, which blocked access to the legislative palace, the vote was relocated to a gymnasium, a move criticized by opposition deputies and senators. The debate began at 16:00 CST, and in the early hours of 4 September 2024, the general text was approved, along party lines in a 359–135 vote, with opposition deputies from the National Action Party (PAN), Institutional Revolutionary Party (PRI), Party of the Democratic Revolution (PRD), and Citizens' Movement (MC) voting against.

In the hours that followed, several amendments were made: Magdalena Núñez Monreal (PT) introduced gender parity and inclusive language provisions, Jesús Martín Cuanalo Araujo (PVEM) proposed allowing judges to continue practicing law after leaving office, and Francisco Ávila Anaya (Morena) secured compensation for judges, including three months' salary and 20 days' pay per year of service. The final vote passed with 357 votes in favor and 130 against, again with all opposition deputies present voting against.

=== Senate ===
On 8 September 2024, the Senate's Constitutional Points and Legislative Studies commissions held a joint meeting, voting along party lines to advance the reform to the full Senate, with 25 votes in favor and 12 against.

With Morena and its allies just one seat short of a supermajority in the Senate, they needed support from at least one opposition senator to meet the two-thirds requirement to pass the reform. Ahead of the Senate vote, opposition parliamentary coordinators—Guadalupe Murguía (PAN), Manuel Añorve (PRI), and Clemente Castañeda (MC)—announced their parties would unanimously oppose the reform. The three parties also claimed external pressure and bribery attempts aimed at convincing senators to defect, with the PAN alleging that state attorneys general were threatening opposition senators. A tracker called the Democratómetro, organized by businessman Claudio X. González, was used to pressure opposition senators into voting against the reform by documenting and publicizing their public statements.

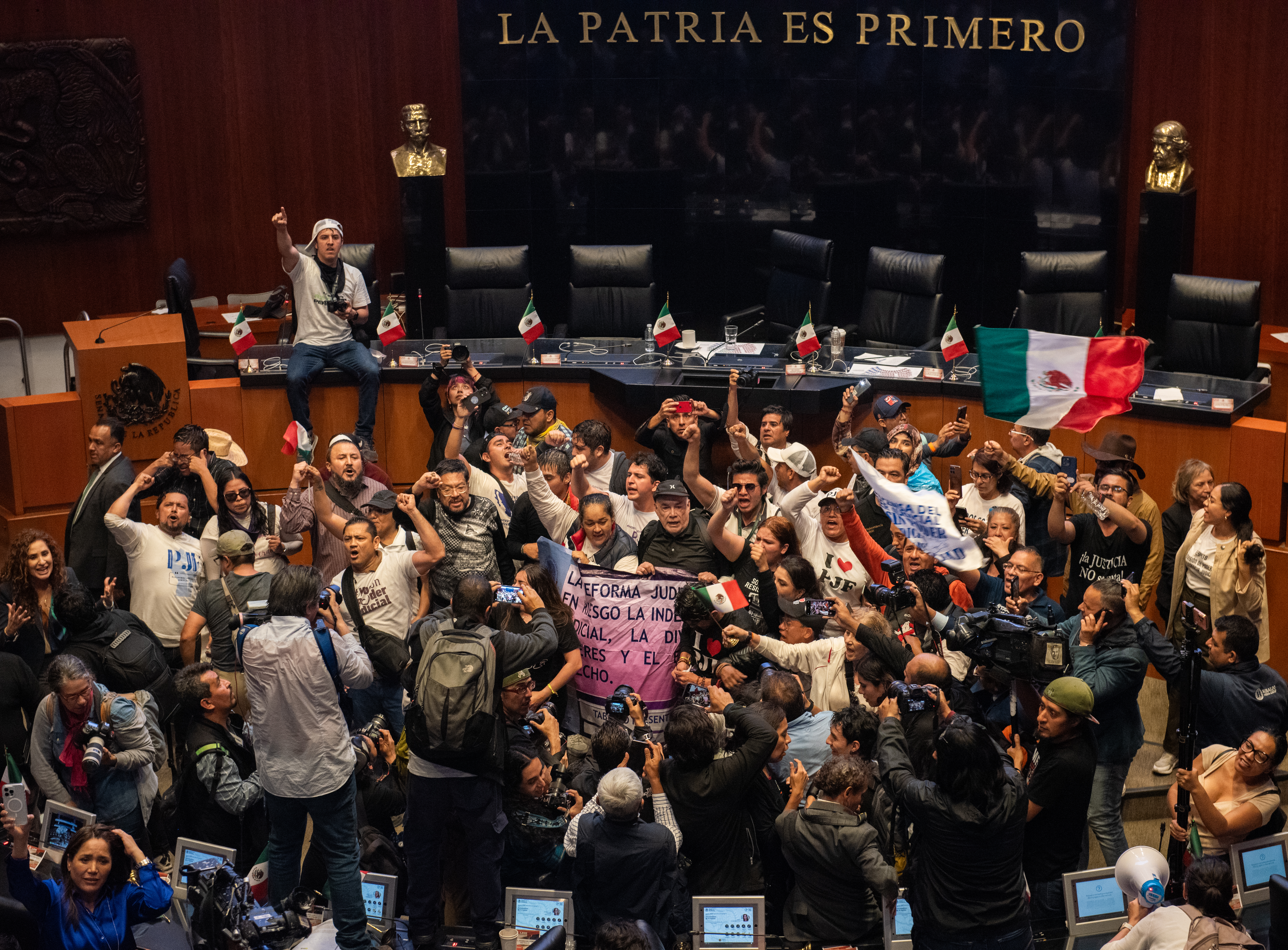
Protesters inside the Senate Chamber on 10 September

On 10 September, the first reading of the reform took place. During the session, two senators were absent: Daniel Barreda (MC) and Miguel Ángel Yunes Márquez (PAN). Claiming that Barreda and his father had been arrested, Citizens' Movement called for a recess, but Adán Augusto López (MORENA) disproved the claim through a phone call with Barreda, and the motion was defeated in an 83–41 vote. Yunes Márquez, who had been widely suspected as likely to defect, submitted a letter requesting a leave of absence. This request was approved in an 83–36 vote, and his alternate, Miguel Ángel Yunes Linares, was sworn in. During a floor speech, Yunes Linares criticized PAN President Marko Cortés for pressuring Yunes Márquez by threatening to expel him from the party if he voted in favor of the bill.

Discussion on the reform began at 14:30 CST but was disrupted when protesters stormed the building, forcing an indefinite recess. The session reconvened at an alternate venue at 19:00 CST, with Mexico City police securing the site. During the session, Yunes Márquez returned to his seat and announced that he would break with his party and vote for the reform. Opposition senators protested at the Senate podium, voicing their objections to the reform and the absence of Daniel Barreda, who had been located in Campeche dealing with his father's arrest, which they described as a kidnapping. The text passed with an 86–41 vote at around 04:00 CST the following morning.

=== Ratification ===
Having been passed by the LXVI Legislature, the reform was sent to state legislatures for consideration. A majority of the states (17 of 32) were required to ratify the reform package for its constitutional amendments to take effect. Oaxaca became the first state to ratify on 11 September 2024, just hours after its approval in the Senate; seventeen other states followed suit over the next 24 hours, most of them ratifying the reform on a fast-track basis. Querétaro was the first state to vote against the reform, followed by Jalisco two days later.

By 12 September, a majority of the states had ratified the reform, with Zacatecas becoming the seventeenth to do so. The state legislature ratification process was finalized in under 24 hours, breaking the previous record set by the 2013 energy reform, which took 45 hours.

On 13 September, the Senate and the Chamber of Deputies convened to issue the constitutional declaration of the reform, formally sending it to President López Obrador for publication. By that time, 23 state congresses had ratified the reform. All opposition deputies and senators boycotted the session.

On 15 September, just before the annual Cry of Dolores, President López Obrador promulgated the judicial reform in the Official Journal of the Federation, with President-elect Claudia Sheinbaum present as a witness.

State legislatures' decisions on the judicial reform
Congress	Date	Ratified	Vote For/Against/Abst.
Oaxaca	11 September	Yes	42–0–0
Tabasco	11 September	Yes	24–8–0
Quintana Roo	11 September	Yes	21–4–0
Veracruz	11 September	Yes	32–11–0
Querétaro	11 September	No	
Baja California Sur	11 September	Yes	19–2–0
Nayarit	11 September	Yes	24–6–0
Colima	11 September	Yes	18–5–0
Yucatán	11 September	Yes	19–16–0
Morelos	11 September	Yes	14–6–0
Durango	11 September	Yes	19–6–0
Baja California	11 September	Yes	20–5–0
Tlaxcala	11 September	Yes	21–4–0
Puebla	11 September	Yes	28–10–0
Campeche	11 September	Yes	22–5–0
Sinaloa	11 September	Yes	31–1–0
Guerrero	12 September	Yes	33–9–4
Zacatecas	12 September	Yes	17–12–0
Tamaulipas	12 September	Yes	20–10–1
Mexico City	12 September	Yes	46–20–0
Mexico	12 September	Yes	54–20–1
Sonora	12 September	Yes	27–6–0
Jalisco	13 September	No	10–26–2
Hidalgo	13 September	Yes	24–6–0
San Luis Potosí	13 September	Yes	19–7–0

== Provisions ==
=== Judicial elections ===
The reform proposes the establishment of elections for all federal judges, including Supreme Court justices. All judges, excluding those in the Supreme Court, would be elected for nine-year terms, with the possibility of one consecutive re-election.

The National Electoral Institute (INE) would oversee judicial elections. Public and private funding, the purchase of media space, and campaigning by political parties would be prohibited.

To be eligible as a candidate for a judicial position, individuals must be Mexican citizens by birth, have no serious criminal convictions, hold a law degree with a minimum grade point average of 8, have at least five years of relevant professional experience, submit a series of essays on pertinent legal topics, and provide five reference letters outlining their qualifications. Candidates cannot have held roles as members of the federal cabinet, attorney general, president, federal deputy, senator, or governor during the year before the election.

A special election was held in 2025 to elect new Supreme Court justices and fill half of all judicial positions. The remaining half would be elected in 2027.

=== Judicial anonymity ===
The reforms allow for cases involving organized crime to be heard by "faceless" judges. The provision was introduced by the Chamber of Deputies during the bill's committee stage in response to a suggestion floated by López Obrador during his daily press conference some days earlier.

=== Judicial oversight ===
The reform proposes replacing the Federal Judiciary Council with the Judicial Disciplinary Tribunal. The tribunal would consist of five members elected by popular vote to serve a single six-year term, with the presidency rotating among the members who receive the highest number of votes. The tribunal would have the authority to sanction, suspend, or remove judges, and its decisions would be non-appealable.

=== Changes to the Supreme Court ===
The number of justices on the Supreme Court would be reduced from 11 to 9 and the length of their terms would be reduced from 15 to 12 years. Additionally, the term of the Supreme Court president would be shortened to two years and would rotate among the justices with the highest vote counts. The chambers were abolished, and all cases are now decided by the nine justices sitting as a single court.

=== Salaries ===
A salary cap would be imposed on all judges, ensuring that no judge's salary exceeds that of the president. Retiring judges would receive three months' salary and 20 days' pay per year of service.

== Challenges ==
=== Action of unconstitutionality 164/2024 ===
On 7 October 2024, the National Action Party (PAN) filed action of unconstitutionality 164/2024, seeking to overturn the judicial reform. In the following days, the Institutional Revolutionary Party (PRI), opposition deputies from the Congress of Zacatecas, Citizens' Movement (MC), and the local party Democratic Unity of Coahuila (UDC) filed actions of unconstitutionality numbered 165/2024, 166/2024, 167/2024, and 170/2024, respectively. These filings were subsequently grouped under action of unconstitutionality 164/2024 and discussed in plenary session.

In response to action of unconstitutionality 164/2024, on 28 October 2024, Supreme Court Justice Juan Luis González Alcántara Carrancá published a draft opinion proposing that the popular election of federal judges be declared unconstitutional, while retaining the provision for the popular election of Supreme Court justices. Both the Morena-led Congress and President Claudia Sheinbaum announced their intent to disregard the ruling, arguing that the Supreme Court lacked the authority to rule on the constitutionality of constitutional amendments.

On 5 November 2024, the Supreme Court began deliberations on the draft opinion, which required a supermajority of eight justices to pass. During the debate, Justices Lenia Batres, Yasmín Esquivel, and Loretta Ortiz voiced their opposition, with Justice Alberto Pérez Dayán also dissenting, arguing that the Court did not have jurisdiction to rule on constitutional amendments. The final vote was 7–4, resulting in the rejection of the draft opinion.

== Analyses of the provisions ==
In May 2024, the Mexican Bar Association, Stanford Law School, and the Inter-American Dialogue stated that "judicial elections compromise the independence and impartiality of the judicial system".

Margaret Satterthwaite, the United Nations special rapporteur on the independence of judges and lawyers, sent a communication to the Mexican government in July 2024 warning that the reform package, as presented on 5 February, "could undermine the independence of the Mexican judiciary". In her letter, she said she was particularly concerned by the context surrounding the reforms, in light of "reports of interference in judicial independence through verbal attacks against certain judges from the executive and legislative branches". She said the proposed changes could "increase the risk of judicial candidates trying to please voters or their campaign sponsors to increase their chances of re-election, instead of taking decisions based exclusively on judicial norms and standards", and went on to detail the potential impact that the proposed amendments would have for judicial independence and compliance with international human rights law.

Human Rights Watch said the proposals would seriously undermine judicial independence and contravene international human rights standards on the right to a fair hearing, arguing that judges should have guaranteed tenure and be protected from political influence. In particular, HRW stressed that trials conducted by "faceless judges" were contrary to the right to a fair trial.

The Washington Office on Latin America (WOLA) called the reform "a setback for human rights" due to the likelihood of a dominant political faction in the legislative and executive branches "capturing" the judicial system through its outsized role in candidate selection. It also warned of "a deepening of penal populism" and a weakening of due process.

In a press release published on 12 September 2024, the Inter-American Commission on Human Rights (IACHR), the autonomous human rights arm of the Organization of American States, expressed its "grave concern" about the judicial reform package. It noted the "hasty" nature of the process, which had hindered meaningful engagement with certain sectors, and that the proposals failed to take account of the threats posed by organized crime in various parts of the country and possible interference in future judicial elections by criminal elements. It also pointed out that "faceless" judges had been ruled incompatible with the American Convention on Human Rights, to which Mexico is a signatory. It called on Mexico to ensure that its judicial reforms were aligned with the American Convention and hemispheric standards governing judicial independence and access to justice and, in light of the ongoing protests and tensions surrounding the reform, for dialogue involving all stakeholders.

== Reactions ==
=== Domestic ===
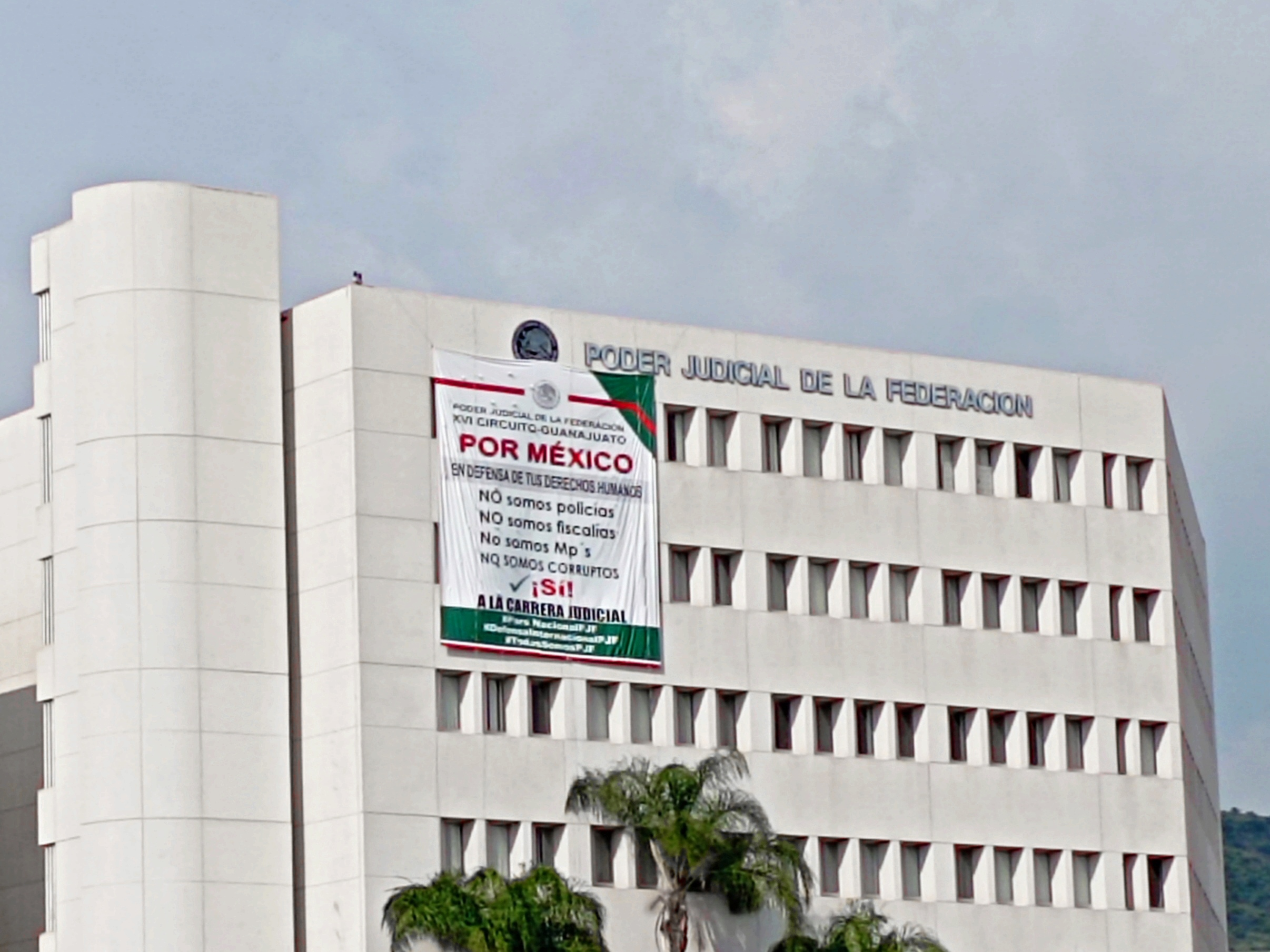
Protest banner at the headquarters of the 16th Circuit in Guanajuato, Gto.

President-elect Claudia Sheinbaum defended López Obrador's proposal in a statement to the Financial Times.

On 19 August 2024, federal judges voted to go on strike in response to the proposal.

On 10 September 2024, the day the Senate was set to begin debating the reforms, protestors stormed the building and interrupted the session.

=== International ===
U.S. Ambassador to Mexico Ken Salazar called the judicial reform a risk to Mexico's democracy and a threat to the commercial relationship between Mexico and the U.S. Due to the criticism of the judicial reform, President López Obrador paused diplomatic relations with U.S. and Canadian embassies on 27 August 2024.

== See also ==
- Judicial reform
- Judiciary of Mexico
- 2025 Mexican judicial elections
