= Due process =

Requirement that courts respect all legal rights owed to people

Due process of law is application by the state of all legal rules and principles pertaining to a case so all legal rights that are owed to a person are respected. Due process balances the power of law of the land and protects the individual person from it. When a government harms a person without following the exact course of the law, this constitutes a due process violation, which offends the rule of law.

Due process has also been frequently interpreted as limiting laws and legal proceedings (see substantive due process) so that judges, instead of legislators, may define and guarantee fundamental fairness, justice, and liberty. That interpretation has proven controversial. Analogous to the concepts of natural justice and procedural justice used in various other jurisdictions, the interpretation of due process is sometimes expressed as a command that the government must not be unfair to the people or abuse them physically or mentally. The term is not used in contemporary English law, but two similar concepts are natural justice, which generally applies only to decisions of administrative agencies and some types of private bodies like trade unions, and the British constitutional concept of the rule of law as articulated by A. V. Dicey and others. However, neither concept lines up perfectly with the American theory of due process, which, as explained below, presently contains many implied rights not found in either ancient or modern concepts of due process in England.

Due process developed from clause 39 of Magna Carta in England. Reference to due process first appeared in a statutory rendition of clause 39 in 1354 thus: "No man of what state or condition he be, shall be put out of his lands or tenements nor taken, nor disinherited, nor put to death, without he be brought to answer by due process of law." When English and American law gradually diverged, due process remained in force in England and became incorporated in the US Constitution.

== By jurisdiction ==
=== Magna Carta ===
In clause 39 of Magna Carta, issued in 1215, King John of England promised: "No free man shall be seized or imprisoned, or stripped of his rights or possessions, or outlawed or exiled, or deprived of his standing in any other way, nor will we proceed with force against him, or send others to do so, except by the lawful judgment of his equals or by the law of the land." Magna Carta itself immediately became part of the "law of the land", and Clause 61 of that charter authorized an elected body of 25 barons to determine by majority vote what redress the King must provide when the King offends "in any respect against any man". Thus, Magna Carta established the rule of law in England by not only requiring the monarchy to obey the law of the land but also limiting how the monarchy could change the law of the land. However, in the 13th century, the provisions may have been referring only to the rights of landowners, and not to ordinary peasantry or villagers.

Shorter versions of Magna Carta were subsequently issued by British monarchs, and Clause 39 of Magna Carta was renumbered "29". The phrase due process of law first appeared in a statutory rendition of Magna Carta in 1354 during the reign of Edward III of England, as follows: "That no Man of what Estate or Condition that he be, shall be put out of Land or Tenement, nor taken, nor imprisoned, nor disinherited, nor put to Death, without being brought in Answer by due Process of the Law."

In 1608, the English jurist Edward Coke wrote a treatise in which he discussed the meaning of Magna Carta. Coke explained that no man shall be deprived but by legem terrae, the law of the land, "that is, by the common law, statute law, or custom of England. ... (that is, to speak it once and for all) by the due course, and process of law."

Both the clause in Magna Carta and the later statute of 1354 were again explained in 1704 (during the reign of Queen Anne) by the Queen's Bench, in the case of Regina v. Paty. In that case, the British House of Commons had deprived John Paty and certain other citizens of the right to vote in an election and committed them to Newgate Prison merely for the offense of pursuing a legal action in the courts. The Queen's Bench, in an opinion by Justice Littleton Powys, explained the meaning of "due process of law" as follows:

[I]t is objected, that by Mag. Chart. c. 29, no man ought to be taken or imprisoned, but by the law of the land. But to this I answer, that lex terrae is not confined to the common law, but takes in all the other laws, which are in force in this realm; as the civil and canon law. ... By the 28 Ed. 3, c. 3, there the words lex terrae, which are used in Mag. Char. are explained by the words, due process of law; and the meaning of the statute is, that all commitments must be by a legal authority; and the law of Parliament is as much a law as any, nay, if there be any superiority this is a superior law.

Chief Justice Holt dissented in this case because he believed that the commitment had not in fact been by a legal authority. The House of Commons had purported to legislate unilaterally, without approval of the British House of Lords, ostensibly to regulate the election of its members. Although the Queen's Bench held that the House of Commons had not infringed or overturned due process, John Paty was ultimately freed by Queen Anne when she prorogued Parliament.

=== Divergence between English and American law ===
Throughout centuries of British history, many laws and treatises asserted various requirements as being part of "due process" or included in the "law of the land". That view usually held in regards to what was required by existing law, rather than what was intrinsically required by due process itself. As the United States Supreme Court has explained, a due process requirement in Britain was not "essential to the idea of due process of law in the prosecution and punishment of crimes, but was only mentioned as an example and illustration of due process of law as it actually existed in cases in which it was customarily used".

Ultimately, the scattered references to "due process of law" in English law did not limit the power of the government; in the words of American law professor John V. Orth, "the great phrases failed to retain their vitality." Orth points out that this is generally attributed to the rise of the doctrine of parliamentary supremacy in the United Kingdom, which was accompanied by hostility towards judicial review as an undemocratic foreign invention.

Scholars have occasionally interpreted Lord Coke's ruling in Dr. Bonham's Case as implying the possibility of judicial review, but by the 1870s, Lord Campbell was dismissing judicial review as "a foolish doctrine alleged to have been laid down extra-judicially in Dr. Bonham's Case..., a conundrum [that] ought to have been laughed at". Lacking the power of judicial review of primary legislation, English courts possessed no means by which to declare an Act of Parliament invalid as a violation of due process. In contrast, American legislators and executive branch officers possessed virtually no means by which to overrule judicial invalidation of statutes or actions as due process violations, with the sole exception of proposing a constitutional amendment, which are rarely successful. As a consequence, English law and American law diverged. Unlike their English counterparts, American judges became increasingly assertive about enforcing due process of law. In turn, the legislative and executive branches learned how to avoid such confrontations in the first place, by tailoring statutes and executive actions to the constitutional requirements of due process as elaborated upon by the judiciary.

In 1977, an English political science professor explained the present situation in England for the benefit of American lawyers:

An American constitutional lawyer might well be surprised by the elusiveness of references to the term 'due process of law' in the general body of English legal writing.... Today one finds no space devoted to due process in Halsbury's Laws of England, in Stephen's Commentaries, or Anson's Law and Custom of the Constitution. The phrase rates no entry in such works as Stroud's Judicial Dictionary or Wharton's Law Lexicon.

Two similar concepts in contemporary English law are natural justice, which generally applies only to decisions of administrative agencies and some types of private bodies like trade unions, and the British constitutional concept of the rule of law as articulated by A. V. Dicey and others. However, neither concept lines up perfectly with the American conception of due process, which presently contains many implied rights not found in the ancient or modern concepts of due process in England.

=== United States ===
The Fifth and Fourteenth Amendments to the United States Constitution each contain a Due Process Clause. Due process deals with the administration of justice and thus the Due Process Clause acts as a safeguard from arbitrary denial of life, liberty, or property by the government outside the sanction of law. The Supreme Court of the United States interprets the clauses as providing four protections: procedural due process (in civil and criminal proceedings), substantive due process, a prohibition against vague laws, and as the vehicle for the incorporation of the Bill of Rights.

=== Others ===
Various countries recognize some form of due process under customary international law. Although the specifics are often unclear, most nations agree that they should guarantee foreign visitors a basic minimum level of justice and fairness. Some nations have argued that they are bound to grant no more rights to foreigners than they do to their own citizens, the doctrine of national treatment, which also means that both would be vulnerable to the same deprivations by the government. With the growth of international human rights law and the frequent use of treaties to govern treatment of foreign nationals abroad, the distinction, in practice, between these two perspectives may be disappearing.

== See also ==
- Abuse of process
- Continuance
- Crime control
- Faceless court
- Fair procedure
- Fundamental justice
- Good governance
- Habeas corpus
- Immigration lawyer
- Justice delayed is justice denied
- Peremptory norm
- Perverting the course of justice
- Presumption of guilt
- Presumption of innocence
- Subpoena ad testificandum
- Subpoena duces tecum
- Prison Litigation Reform Act
