= Lenia Batres =

Mexican lawyer and politician

Lenia Batres Guadarrama
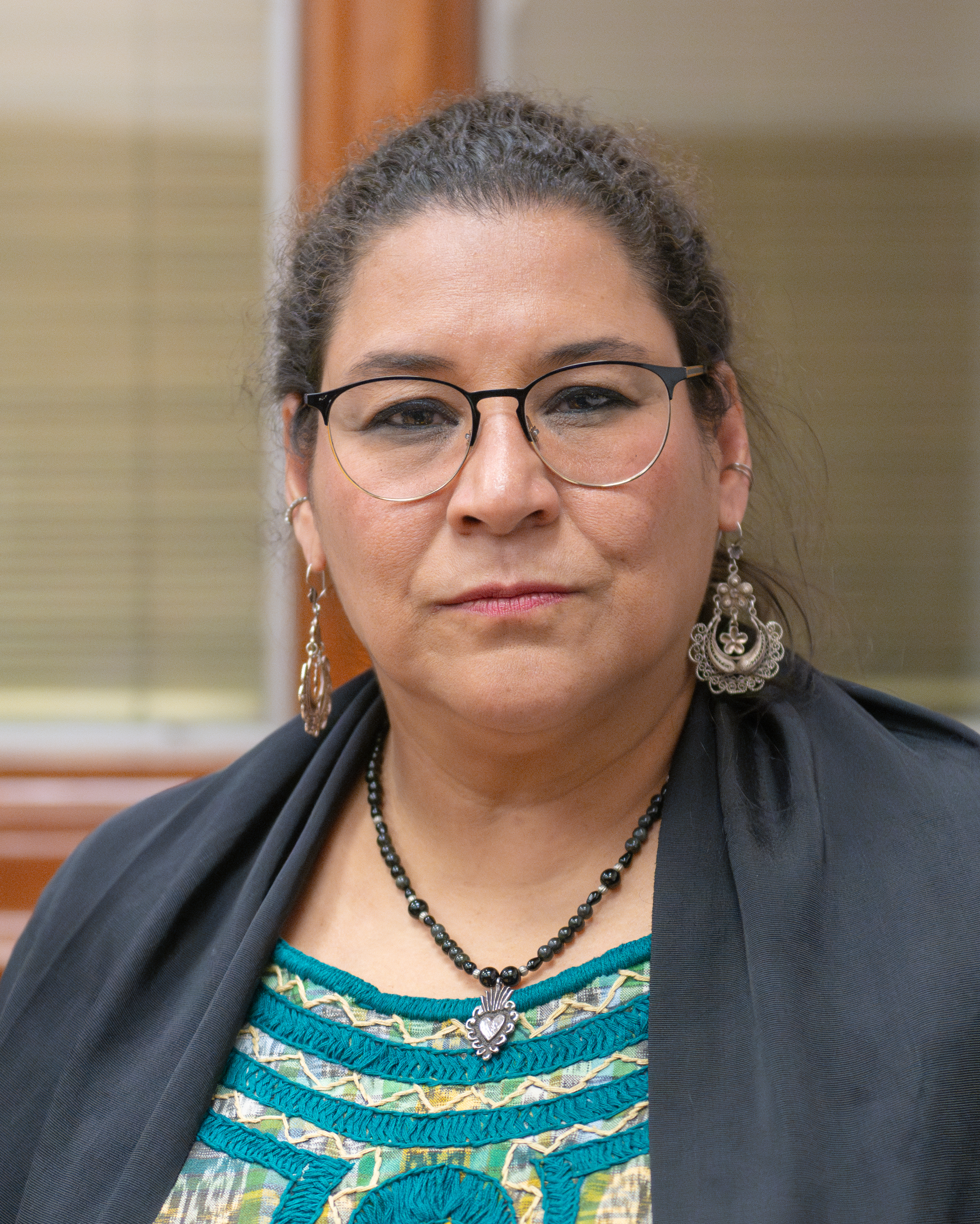
- Batres in 2025

Justice of the Supreme Court of Justice of the Nation
- Incumbent
- Assumed office 14 December 2023
- Appointed by: Andrés Manuel López Obrador (Note: In December 2023, she was appointed directly by President Andrés Manuel López Obrador, after the Senate twice failed to approve the nominees submitted by López Obrador by a two-thirds majority. Following the 2024 judicial reforms, she stood in the 2025 judicial election and was returned to the Supreme Court.)
- Preceded by: Arturo Zaldívar Lelo de Larrea

Member of the Chamber of Deputies
- In office 1 September 1997 – 31 August 2000
- Constituency: Fourth electoral region

Personal details
- Born: Lenia Batres Guadarrama; 6 August 1969 (age 57) Mexico City, Mexico
- Party: National Regeneration Movement (since 2014)
- Other political affiliations: Party of the Democratic Revolution (1989–2014)
- Relatives: Martí Batres
- Education: Urban studies, public administration and law; Universidad Nacional Autónoma de México (1990-1994)
- Occupation: Lawyer and politician

Lenia Batres Guadarrama (born 6 August 1969) is a Mexican lawyer and politician. She is a member of the Morena party and, since 14 December 2023, has been a minister of the Supreme Court of Justice of the Nation.

== Political trajectory ==
She was a member of the Unified Socialist Party of Mexico, the Revolutionary Democratic Party, and social organizations such as the Union of Neighbors of the Doctors Colony, the National Union of Youth, and the University Student Council. She actively participated in the peaceful civil resistance movement led by Andrés Manuel López Obrador (2006-2018), coordinating brigades against the oil reform promoted by Felipe Calderón in 2008, contributing to the formation of MORENA in Tultitlán, State of Mexico (2010-2011), and Nuevo León (2012-2013), and serving on its first National Council and first Executive Committee for the City of Mexico (2013-2016).
