= Martí Batres =

Mexican politician

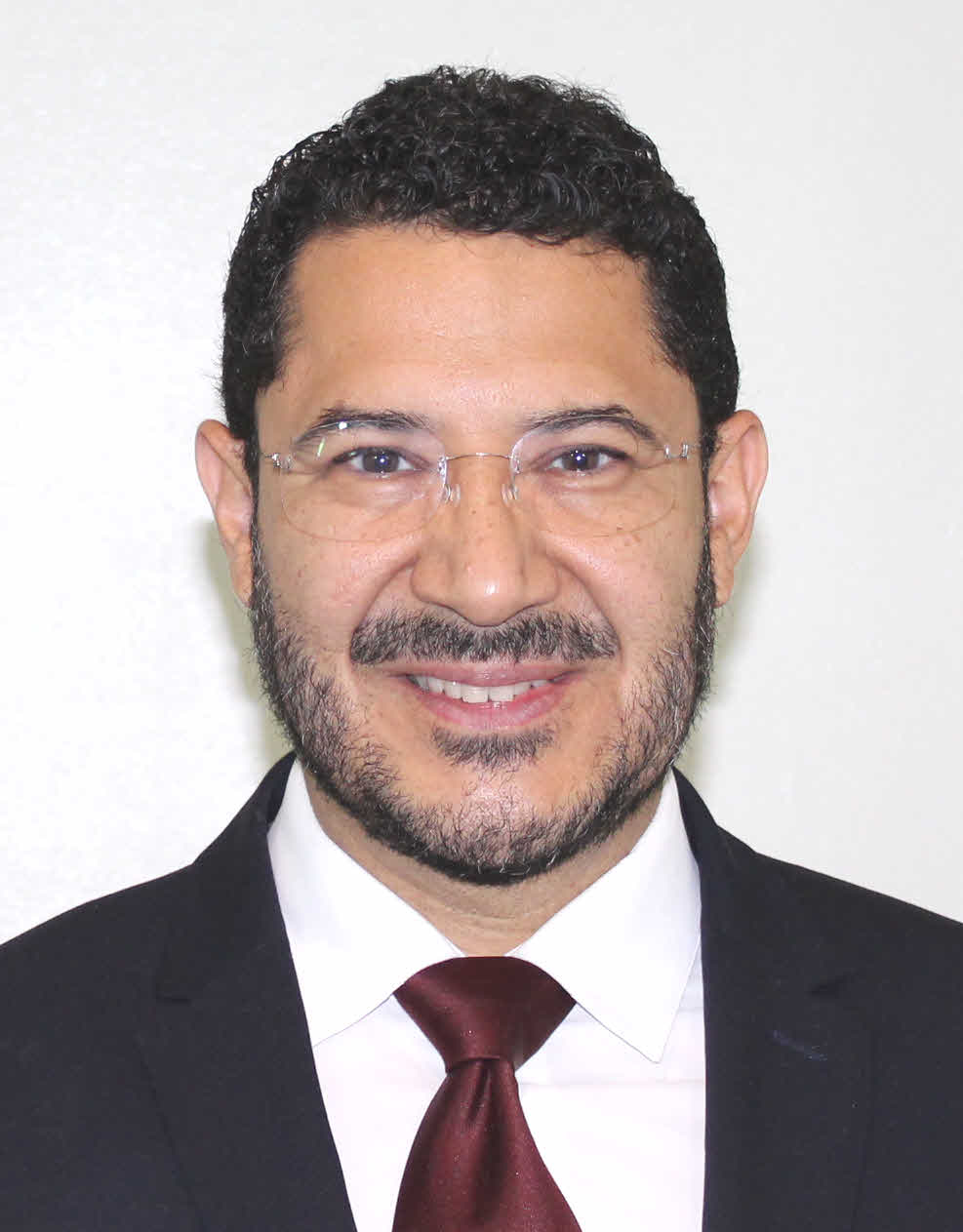
- Martí Batres

Director General of the Institute for Social Security and Services for State Workers
- Incumbent
- Assumed office 5 October 2024
- President: Claudia Sheinbaum
- Preceded by: Bertha María Alcalde Luján

Head of Government of Mexico City
- Substitute
- In office 16 June 2023 – 4 October 2024
- Preceded by: Claudia Sheinbaum
- Succeeded by: Clara Brugada

President of the Senate of Mexico
- In office 1 September 2018 – 31 August 2019
- Preceded by: Ernesto Cordero Arroyo
- Succeeded by: Mónica Fernández Balboa

Senator of the Republic from Mexico City
- In office 1 September 2018 – 15 July 2021
- Preceded by: Mario Martín Delgado

President of the National Regeneration Movement
- In office 9 July 2014 – 20 November 2015
- Preceded by: Position established
- Succeeded by: Andrés Manuel López Obrador

President of the Political Coordination Board of the Chamber of Deputies
- In office 1 September 2002 – 31 August 2003
- Preceded by: Felipe Calderón Hinojosa
- Succeeded by: Elba Esther Gordillo

Personal details
- Born: 26 January 1967 (age 59) Mexico City, Mexico
- Party: National Regeneration Movement (2012–present)
- Other political affiliations: Party of the Democratic Revolution (1988–2012)
- Parent(s): Cuauhtémoc Batres; Rosario Guadarrama
- Relatives: Lenia Batres (sister)
- Education: Universidad Humanitas

Martí Batres Guadarrama (born 26 January 1967) is a Mexican politician who is the general director of ISSSTE in the government of President Claudia Sheinbaum. Batres was the substitute head of government of Mexico City following Sheinbaum's departure from the office to run for President of Mexico. He is also the former President of the National Regeneration Movement (MORENA) and served as Deputy of the LXII Legislature of the Mexican Congress representing the Federal District, as well as the Legislative Assembly of the Federal District.

== Career ==
Batres was Secretary of Social Development in the Distrito Federal Government from 2006 to 2011. He was the President of the Senate in the LXIV Legislature of the Mexican Congress.

Claudia Sheinbaum nominated him as her successor as Mayor of Mexico City following her resignation to pursue her presidential campaign. The local congress approved Batres' nomination with a vote of 64-1, and he served as mayor until 4 October 2024.
