= 2024 Mexican judicial reform protests =

Protests against the 2024 Mexican judicial reform

- Part of the reactions to the 2024 Mexican judicial reform
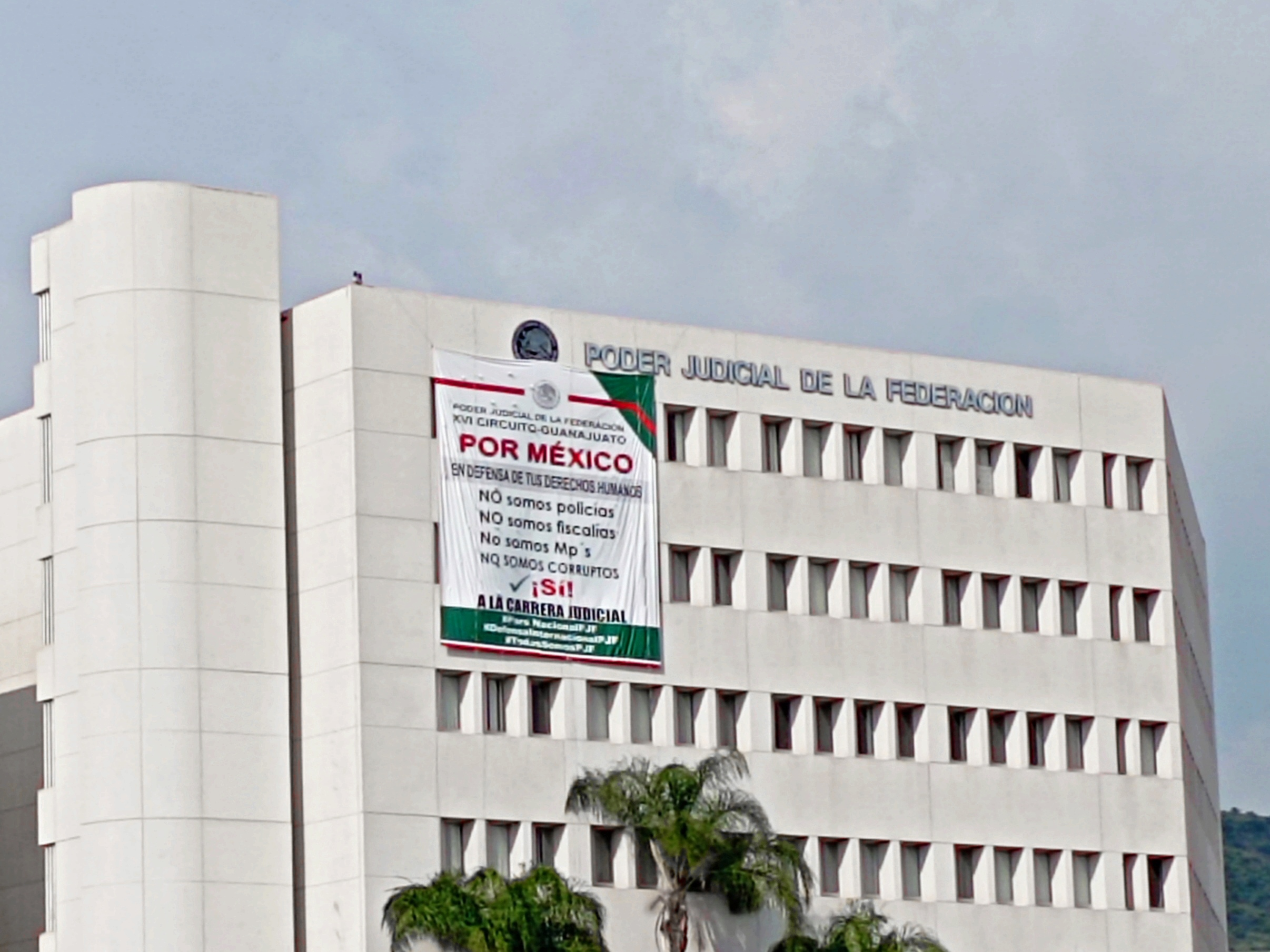
- Protest banner on a judiciary building in Guanajuato
- Date: 19 August 2024 – 5 November 2024 (2 months, 2 weeks and 3 days)
- Location: Mexico
- Caused by: 2024 Mexican judicial reform
- Goals: Cancellation of the judicial reform bill

Parties
(Mexico) Anti-judicial reform protesters: National Action Party; Institutional Revolutionary Party; Citizens' Movement; Workers of the Judicial Branch of the Federation; Supported by: Students from the National Autonomous University of Mexico; Students from the Monterrey Institute of Technology and Higher Education	Government of Mexico: Cabinet of AMLO; Morena; Ecologist Green Party of Mexico; Labor Party; Supported by: Counterprotesters (pro-reform)

Lead figures
Norma Lucía Piña Hernández (Mexico) Alejandro Moreno Cárdenas (Mexico) Marko Antonio Cortés Mendoza	Andrés Manuel López Obrador; Claudia Sheinbaum (Mexico) Gerardo Fernández Noroña

A series of protests began in Mexico on 19 August 2024, following the start of the legislative process of the 2024 Mexican judicial reform.

== Background ==
On 5 February 2024, President Andrés Manuel López Obrador proposed a judicial reform, claiming it would root out corruption in the judiciary, which he had previously accused of being complicit in white-collar crime and being influenced by external actors. The plan was then supported by his successor, Claudia Sheinbaum.

The reform would transform the country's judiciary from an appointment-based system to one where judges are elected by popular vote. However, the reform was widely denounced by opposition political parties, judicial workers, and international organizations (such as Human Rights Watch), who claimed the reform would threaten judicial independence.

== Timeline ==
=== Beginning of the movement (19–31 August) ===
On 19 August, judicial workers across 29 states began an indefinite strike, closing several federal judiciary buildings. They set up banners and tents outside these sites to protest the judicial reform bill. The Association of Federal Judges, representing 1,403 judges and magistrates, voted to join the strike by 21 August, with 1,202 members in favor.

In response, President López Obrador acknowledged the workers' right to protest but dismissed claims that the reform would affect their rights, referring to the demonstrators as paleros ("shills"). He also defended the reform, stating that the goal was to eliminate corruption and privileges in the judiciary.

On 26 August, hundreds of protesters gathered at Mexico City's Angel of Independence to demonstrate against the judicial reform, with no reported incidents.

On 29 August, access to the Supreme Court was blocked by protesters.

=== Legislative process (1–15 September) ===
On 1 September, the first day of the LXVI Legislature, numerous students from private and public universities protested in solidarity with judicial workers, gathering at Paseo de la Reforma in Mexico City. Participants included students from the National Autonomous University of Mexico, the Monterrey Institute of Technology and Higher Education, the Escuela Libre de Derecho, and the Universidad Iberoamericana.

The next day, a third of Supreme Court judicial workers voted to join the protests and strike, with 951 in favor, 116 against, and 5 abstentions.

On 3 September, the day the Chamber of Deputies was to vote on the judicial reform, protesters blocked the entrance to the Legislative Palace of San Lázaro, prompting the deputies to move to an alternate venue at a gymnasium. In solidarity with the protesters, the Supreme Court voted 8–3 to suspend its activities for one week.

On 5 September, the Senate was blocked by protestors, prompting its relocation to an alternate venue.

On 6 September, Norma Piña, the President of the Supreme Court, joined a protest in front of the Legislative Palace of San Lázaro.

On 8 September, about 3,000 protesters gathered along Paseo de la Reforma to oppose the proposed judicial reform. Similar protests occurred across the country, while smaller counter-protests were also held on the same avenue.

==== Storming of legislatures ====
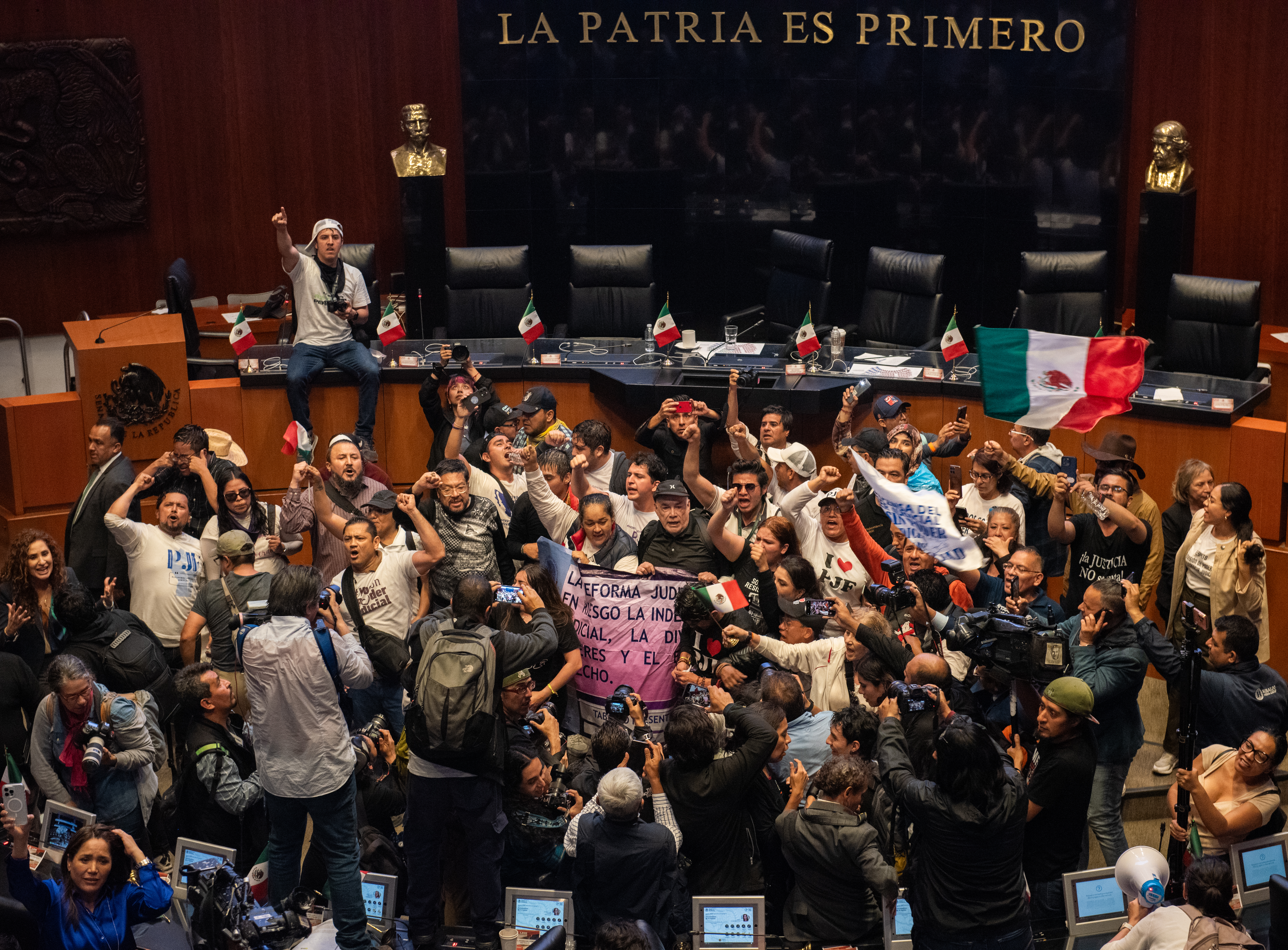
Protesters during the storming of the Senate chamber on 10 September 2024

On 10 September, as the Senate was discussing the judicial reform bill, the session was abruptly halted around 16:26 CST when protesters broke through one of the glass doors and stormed the Senate chamber. Security responded by spraying fire extinguishers against the protesters. Although most senators were evacuated, some stayed behind to speak with the protesters. During the incident, a person from Civil Protection was injured and required medical attention.

Following the disruption, President of the Senate Gerardo Fernández Noroña relocated the discussion to the old Senate building at the Casona de Xicoténcatl. Protesters followed the senators to the alternate venue. Once Miguel Ángel Yunes Márquez announced his support for the judicial reform, securing the required two-thirds majority for its passage, the protesters clashed with Mexico City police stationed outside in an attempt to storm the building. Despite these clashes, the bill was passed on the morning of 11 September.

On 11 September, as state legislatures convened to ratify the judicial reform, protesters stormed legislative buildings in Yucatán, Baja California, and Puebla, causing sessions to be postponed or suspended.

=== Post-passage (16 September – 5 November) ===
On 17 September, the Supreme Court resumed its activities in order to begin implementing the judicial reform.

On 18 September, the Federal Judiciary Council announced that federal strikes would conclude on 23 September. However, the strikes were later extended to 2 October and then again to 11 October. On 11 October, the council voted to end the strikes on 16 October but decided to adopt another form of protest.

On 15 October, protesters blocked passenger vehicle traffic at the Bridge of the Americas in Ciudad Juárez. On the same day, demonstrators unsuccessfully attempted to storm the National Palace while President Sheinbaum was meeting with businessmen from the United States and Mexico.

== See also ==
- 2023 Israeli judicial reform protests
- 2024 Bangladesh quota reform movement
