= Dora Martínez Valero =

Mexican politician

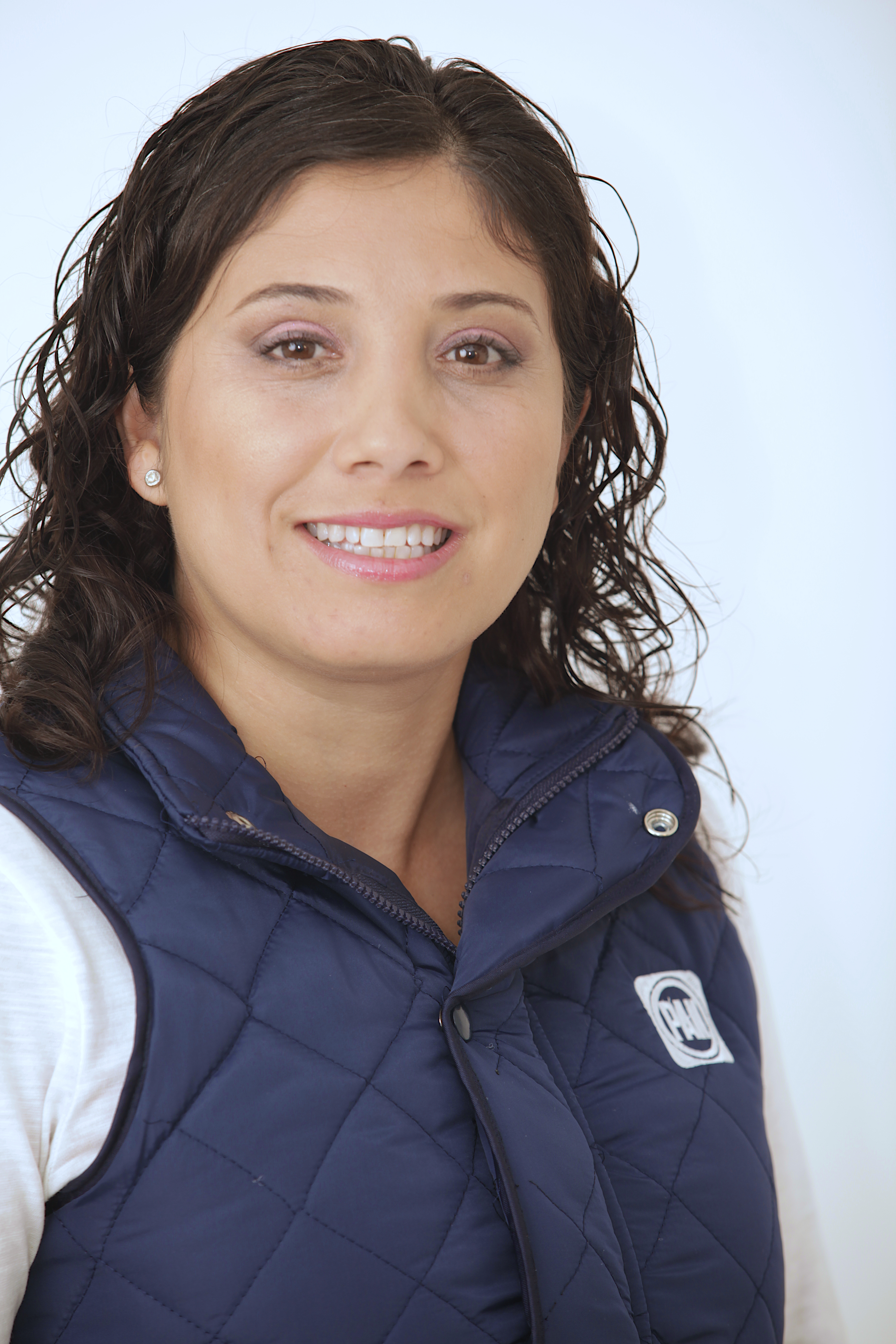
- Born: 3 January 1976 (age 50); Coahuila, Mexico
- Occupation: Politician
- Political party: PAN

Dora Alicia Martínez Valero (born 3 January 1976) is a Mexican politician from the National Action Party. From 2006 to 2009, she served as Deputy of the LX Legislature of the Mexican Congress, representing Coahuila.
