= Alberto Pérez Dayán =

Mexican jurist (born 1960)

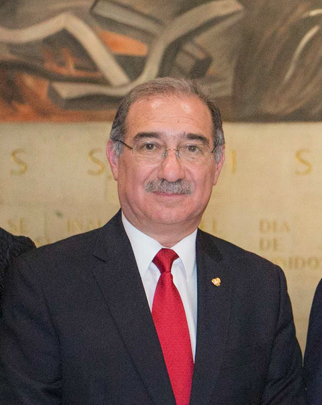
A portrait of Pérez Dayán

Alberto Gelacio Pérez Dayán (born December 13, 1960) is an associate justice of the Supreme Court of Justice of the Nation. President Felipe Calderon nominated him to the Supreme Court in 2010 and 2012, being elected by the Mexican Senate by a majority of 104 votes on December 3, 2012. He serves at the Second Chamber of the Court.

Pérez Dayán attended Universidad La Salle, where he obtained his law degree in 1984. He holds a Masters and a Ph.D. Degree in administrative law from the National Autonomous University of Mexico.

Judge Pérez Dayán held the deciding vote during a session to invalidate part of the 2024 Mexican judicial reform to the Federal Judiciary. Initially, Pérez Dayán had stated he would vote in favor of accepting the appeal, but during the session, he reversed his position and voted against it, arguing that political parties were not entitled to request such appeals. Days earlier, Pérez Dayán had met with Mexico's president, Claudia Sheinbaum, and Adán Augusto López, the President of the Board of Political Coordination of the Senate. Pérez Dayán denied any coercion in his vote.
