= John V. Orth =

American legal scholar and author

John V. Orth is an American legal scholar and author. He is the William Rand Kenan Jr. Professor of Law Emeritus at the University of North Carolina School of Law.

== Educational Background ==
He earned an A.B. (1969) at Oberlin College, and then proceeded to acquire a J.D. (1974), M.A. (1975), and PhD (1977) at Harvard University.

== Publications ==
Books

- DUE PROCESS OF LAW: A BRIEF HISTORY (Y. Mingcheng trans., Commercial Press, Beijing, 2006) (2003).
- HOW MANY JUDGES DOES IT TAKE TO MAKE A SUPREME COURT? AND OTHER ESSAYS ON LAW AND THE CONSTITUTION (University Press of Kansas, 2006).
- DUE PROCESS OF LAW: A BRIEF HISTORY (University Press of Kansas 2003).
- THE NORTH CAROLINA STATE CONSTITUTION, WITH HISTORY AND COMMENTARY (University of North Carolina Press, 1995).
- COMBINATION AND CONSPIRACY: A LEGAL HISTORY OF TRADE UNIONISM, 1721-1906 (Oxford University Press, 1991).
- THE JUDICIAL POWER OF THE UNITED STATES: THE ELEVENTH AMENDMENT IN AMERICAN HISTORY (Oxford University Press, 1991).

Articles and Book Chapters

- Fact and Fiction in the Law of Property, 11 GREEN BAG 2d 65 (2007). LexisNexis Westlaw
- Second Thoughts in the Law of Property, 10 GREEN BAG 2d 65 (2006). LexisNexis Westlaw
- The Enumeration of Rights: "Let Me Count the Ways," 9 U. PA. J. CONST. L. 281 (2006). LexisNexis Westlaw
- A Bridge, a Tax Revolt, and the Struggle to Industrialize: A Comment, 84 N.C. L. REV. 1927 (2006). Hein LexisNexis Westlaw
- The Burden of an Easement, 40 REAL PROP. PROB. & TR. J. 639 (2006). Hein LexisNexis Westlaw
- The Race to the Bottom, 9 GREEN BAG 2d 47 (2005). LexisNexis Westlaw
- Who Judges the Judges?, 32 FLA. ST. U. L. REV. 1245 (2005). Hein LexisNexis Westlaw
- Intention in the Law of Property: The Law of Unintended Consequences, 8 GREEN BAG 2d 59 (2004). LexisNexis Westlaw
- Relocating Easements: A Response to Professor French, 38 REAL PROP., PROB. & TR. J. 643 (2004). LexisNexis
- The Secret Sources of Judicial Power, 50 LOY. L. REV. 529 (2004). Hein LexisNexis
- THOMPSON ON REAL PROPERTY (2d. ed. 2004)(chapters 31-33, concurrent estates) (revised annually).
- Judging the Tournament (contribution to online symposium, "The Judicial Confirmation Process: Selecting Federal Judges in the Twenty-First Century") (2003), in JURIST, at http://jurist.law.pitt.edu/forum/symposium-jc.
- The Mystery of the Rule in Shelley’s Case, 7 GREEN BAG 2d 45 (2003). LexisNexis Westlaw
- Night Thoughts: Reflections on the Debate Concerning Same-Sex Marriage, 3 NEV. L.J. 560 (2003). Hein LexisNexis
- Sale of Defective Houses: Cicero and the Moral Choice, 6 GREEN BAG 2d 163 (2003). LexisNexis Westlaw
- Common Law; Commonwealth v. Hunt; Probate; Trust; and Will, in THE OXFORD COMPANION TO AMERICAN LAW (K. Hall ed., Oxford University Press 2002).
- How Many Judges Does It Take to Make a Supreme Court? 19 CONST. COMMENT. 681 (2002). LexisNexis Westlaw
- Joint Tenancy Law: Plus Ca Change..., 5 GREEN BAG 2d 173 (2002). LexisNexis Westlaw
- What's Wrong With the Law of Finders and How to Fix It, 4 GREEN BAG 2d 391 (2001). LexisNexis Westlaw
- "Confusion Worse Confounded": The Residential Rental Agreement Act, 78 N.C. L. REV. 783 (2000). Hein LexisNexis Westlaw
- History and the Eleventh Amendment, 75 NOTRE DAME L. REV. 1147 (2000). Hein LexisNexis Westlaw
- John Marshall and "Debts Which Ought Never to Have Been Contracted": An Unpublished Letter, 4 GREEN BAG 2d 49 (2000). LexisNexis Westlaw
- Presidential Impeachment: The Original Misunderstanding, 17 CONST. COMMENT. 587 (2000). Hein LexisNexis Westlaw
- Did Sir Edward Coke Mean What He Said?, 16 CONST. COMMENT. 33 (1999). Hein LexisNexis Westlaw
- Joint Tenancies, Tenancies in Common,& Tenancies by the Entirety, in 4 THOMPSON ON REAL PROPERTY (Thomas ed., annual supp.).
- Bettman, Alfred; Connor, Henry Groves; Fuller, Melville Weston; Gray, John Chipman; Haywood, John; Henderson, Leonard; and Lurton, Horace Harmon, in AMERICAN NATIONAL BIOGRAPHY (J. Garraty ed., Oxford University Press 1999).
- Contract and the Common Law (Ch. 2), in THE STATE AND FREEDOM OF CONTRACT (H. N. Scheiber ed., Stanford University Press 1998).
- Exporting the Rule of Law, 24 N.C. J. INT'L L. & COM. REG. 71 (1998). Hein LexisNexis Westlaw
- John Marshall and the Rule of Law, 49 S.C. L. REV. 633 (1998). Hein LexisNexis Westlaw
- Taking from A and Giving to B: Substantive Due Process and the Case of the Shifting Paradigm, 14 CONST. COMMENT. 337 (1997). Hein LexisNexis Westlaw
- Tenancy by the Entirety: The Strange Career of the Common-Law Marital Estate, 1997 B.Y.U. L. REV. 35 (1997). Hein LexisNexis Westlaw
- Why the North Carolina Court of Appeals Should Have a Procedure for Sitting En Banc, 75 N.C. L. REV. 1981 (1997). Hein LexisNexis Westlaw
- Russell v. Hill (N.C. 1899): Misunderstood Lessons, 73 N.C. L. REV. 2031 (1995). Hein LexisNexis Westlaw
- Who Is a Tenant? The Correct Definition of the Status in North Carolina, 21 N.C. CENT'L L.J. 79 (1995). Hein
- Contributions to THE ENCYCLOPEDIA OF AMERICAN CIVIL LIBERTIES, THE ENCYCLOPEDIA OF NORTH CAROLINA, GOVERNMENTS OF THE WORLD, and THE AMERICAN MIDWEST: AN INTERPRETIVE ENCYCLOPEDIA.
- Book reviews for ALBION, THE AMERICAN HISTORICAL REVIEW, THE AMERICAN JOURNAL OF LEGAL HISTORY, THE JOURNAL OF CHURCH AND STATE, and The NEW CRIMINAL LAW REVIEW.
