= Alberto Pérez Pérez =

Uruguayan legal scholar

Alberto Pérez Pérez (Montevideo, 15 June 1937 - 2 September 2017) was a Uruguayan legal scholar and human rights advocate.

In the early 1970s he was Dean of the School of Law, University of the Republic. The civic-military dictatorship destituted him and he had to go in exile.

Afterwards he was a member of the Inter-American Court of Human Rights.
