= Faceless court =

Special court

A faceless court, also known as a faceless judge, is a special court of justice, created within the system of certain jurisdictions, responsible for the prosecution and trial of crimes generally linked to drug trafficking, terrorism and organized crime. They are used within the judicial systems of states that cannot guarantee the security and physical integrity of judicial officials. These are courts where the judges are anonymous and their identity is unknown.

This special type of court was first created in Italy, where they were implemented for trials against local mafias. They were also used in Colombia in the 1990s to prosecute heads of drug trafficking organizations, and during the government of Alberto Fujimori in Peru, for trials against the terrorism of the Shining Path and MRTA organizations. In Brazil, the states of Rio de Janeiro, Pará, Mato Grosso, Bahia, Roraima, Santa Catarina and Alagoas allow their use in the prosecution of drug trafficking and militia crimes. Anonymous judges are also a part of Mexico's 2024 judicial reform bill.

The United Nations Human Rights Committee and the Inter-American Court of Human Rights have both held that prosecutions heard by faceless judges violate the right to a fair trial. Specifically, the Human Rights Committee has ruled that they are incompatible with the International Covenant on Civil and Political Rights in that "they fail to guarantee a cardinal aspect of a fair trial within the meaning of article 14 ... that the tribunal must be, and be seen to be, independent and impartial". The Inter-American Court has also said that when they are used, "defendants have no way of knowing the identity of their judge and therefore, of assessing their competence".

== See also ==
- Abimael Guzmán, terrorist leader tried and convicted by a Peruvian faceless court in 1992
