= Morena (political party) =

Mexican political party

National Regeneration Movement Movimiento Regeneración Nacional
- Abbreviation: MORENA
- President: Ariadna Montiel Reyes
- Secretary-General: Carolina Rangel Gracida
- Senate Leader: Ignacio Mier Velazco
- Chamber Leader: Ricardo Monreal Ávila
- Founder: Andrés Manuel López Obrador
- Founded: 2 October 2011; 15 years ago
- Registered: 10 July 2014; 12 years ago
- Split from: Party of the Democratic Revolution
- Headquarters: Santa Anita #50, Col. Viaducto Piedad C.P. 08200 Iztacalco, Mexico City
- Newspaper: Regeneración
- Membership (2026): ▲11,629,541
- Ideology: Anti-neoliberalism; Progressivism; Left-wing nationalism; Left-wing populism; Energy nationalism
- Political position: Centre-left to left-wing
- National affiliation: Sigamos Haciendo Historia (since 2023) (Note: Previously part of Juntos Haremos Historia (2017–2020) and Juntos Hacemos Historia (2020–2023).)
- Regional affiliation: São Paulo Forum
- Colours: Maroon
- Slogan: La esperanza de México ('The hope of Mexico')
- Chamber of Deputies: 254 / 500
- Senate: 66 / 128
- Governorships: 23 / 32
- State legislatures: 495 / 1,123
- Mayors: 731 / 2,052

Website
- morena.org
- Politics of Mexico; Political parties; Elections; A: The party has also been described as far-left or consisting of far-left factions.

The National Regeneration Movement (Spanish: Movimiento Regeneración Nacional), commonly referred to by its syllabic abbreviation Morena (Spanish: [moˈɾena]), is a centre-left to left-wing political party in Mexico. Founded in 2011 by Andrés Manuel López Obrador as a civil association and registered as a political party in 2014, it emerged from López Obrador's break with the Party of the Democratic Revolution. Since its formation, Morena has grown rapidly to become the dominant political force in the country.

Morena's platform combines elements of left-wing populism and progressivism. It opposes neoliberal economic policies and supports expanded social welfare programs, increased public investment in infrastructure, and state control over strategic industries such as energy, oil, and electricity. Drawing substantial backing from working-class voters, rural communities, the urban poor, and regions historically underserved by federal investment, Morena positions itself as an alternative to the long-dominant Institutional Revolutionary Party (PRI) and the conservative National Action Party (PAN). The party's name also alludes to Mexico's Catholic national patroness: the Virgin of Guadalupe, known as La Morena, meaning "tan-skinned" in Spanish.

As of 2026, Morena holds the presidency, majorities in both the Chamber of Deputies and the Senate, and most governorships, making it the largest political party in Mexico by representation. It also holds significant influence over the federal judiciary, with many elected judges having ties to the party. As of 2026, with 11,629,541 members, it is also the largest political party in the history of Mexico. The party's dominance has reshaped Mexico's political landscape, ushering in what some analysts describe as a new era of hegemony.

== History ==
=== Early political background ===
Following the 2006 presidential election, in which Coalition for the Good of All candidate Andrés Manuel López Obrador made allegations of election fraud after narrowly losing to Felipe Calderón, the left-wing parties that supported López Obrador's candidacy formed the legislative bloc Broad Progressive Front during the LX Legislature to promote his political platform and counteract Calderón's administration. However, during the legislative session, many legislators from the Party of the Democratic Revolution (PRD), the bloc's largest party, began to distance themselves from López Obrador, who was increasingly perceived as radical due to his election fraud claims. In the 2008 PRD leadership election, Jesús Ortega, from the party's "Nueva Izquierda" (lit. 'New Left') faction, defeated López Obrador ally Alejandro Encinas Rodríguez for the party presidency. "Nueva Izquierda" favored cooperation with other political forces, marking a shift away from López Obrador's confrontational strategy.

In 2008, Calderón's administration introduced an energy reform that López Obrador and his followers argued was a step toward privatizing the state-owned petroleum company, Pemex. In response, he organized the "Movimiento Nacional en Defensa del Petróleo, el Patrimonio y la Economía Popular" (lit. 'National Movement in Defense of Oil, Heritage, and the Popular Economy'), which mobilized supporters in rallies and sit-ins to oppose the measures. The reform was ultimately approved with support from the Institutional Revolutionary Party (PRI), the National Action Party (PAN), and factions of PRD legislators. Due to this, in the 2009 legislative elections, López Obrador only endorsed candidates from the Labor Party (PT), Convergence (CON), or his faction of the PRD.

Following the 2009 legislative elections, internal shifts within the PT and CON led both parties to participate in 2010 electoral coalitions with the PRD and the PAN in several key gubernatorial contests aimed at curbing the PRI's resurgence, a strategy that further distanced López Obrador and his supporters from the PRD's leadership.

=== Founding and early years (2011–2017) ===
==== Civil association ====
On 10 January 2011, López Obrador, drawing from his successful mobilization of activists during the "National Movement in Defense of Oil, Heritage, and the Popular Economy," announced the creation of a new social and political organization aimed at defending the vote ahead of the 2012 general election, naming it the National Regeneration Movement (Morena). Morena was officially founded as a civil association on 2 October 2011, with the goal of creating "Voter Defense Committees" in 66,000 electoral sections across Mexico to monitor for potential election fraud. According to López Obrador, the movement attracted nearly four million supporters within its first nine months.

For the 2012 general election, López Obrador was once again nominated by the Party of the Democratic Revolution (PRD), Labor Party (PT), and Citizens' Movement (MC) in a coalition called the Progressive Movement. On election day, López Obrador's surveillance plan was successful, with Morena achieving total coverage across all 300 electoral districts. Despite these efforts, López Obrador once again finished in second place, losing to the PRI's Enrique Peña Nieto.

After the election, growing disagreements between López Obrador and the PRD leadership over the future of Morena led to López Obrador's departure from the PRD on 9 September 2012. The PRD leadership had considered forming a legislative bloc with the PAN, a move López Obrador criticized, later accusing the party of having "betrayed the people" by aligning with both the PAN and later with Peña Nieto's PRI.

==== Transition to a political party and first elections ====
On 20 November 2012, Morena's first National Congress took place, where it formally started its transition from a civil association to a political party. During the congress, attendees approved the statutes and action plan for the party, elected 300 councillors to form the Morena National Council, and selected Martí Batres as president of the National Executive Committee. While some PRD politicians, such as Ricardo Monreal, supported López Obrador's decision, describing it as a "divorce of convenience" to avoid further polarization in the country, others, like Cuauhtémoc Cárdenas, criticized him, claiming it further splintered the Mexican left. A 2012 poll indicated that a majority of the public held a negative view of Morena's establishment as a political party.

On 7 January 2014, Batres submitted documents to the National Electoral Institute (INE) for registration as a political party. The INE officially approved Morena on 10 July, allowing it to receive federal funds and participate in the 2015 legislative election. In its electoral debut, the party won 35 seats in the Chamber of Deputies, becoming the fifth-largest parliamentary group. In the 2015 Federal District local elections, Morena managed to flip five boroughs from the PRD, marking its emergence as a political force in the Federal District.

Over the following two years, Morena consolidated its organizational structure and positioned itself as an opposition to President Peña Nieto's administration, drawing on public dissatisfaction with the government and the Pact for Mexico reform agenda. In the 2017 State of Mexico gubernatorial election, the Labor Party candidate withdrew in favor of Morena's nominee, who was narrowly defeated by the PRI candidate by a margin of approximately 2.8 percentage points, the party's closest electoral defeat to that date.

=== Consolidation and the "Fourth Transformation" (2018–present) ===
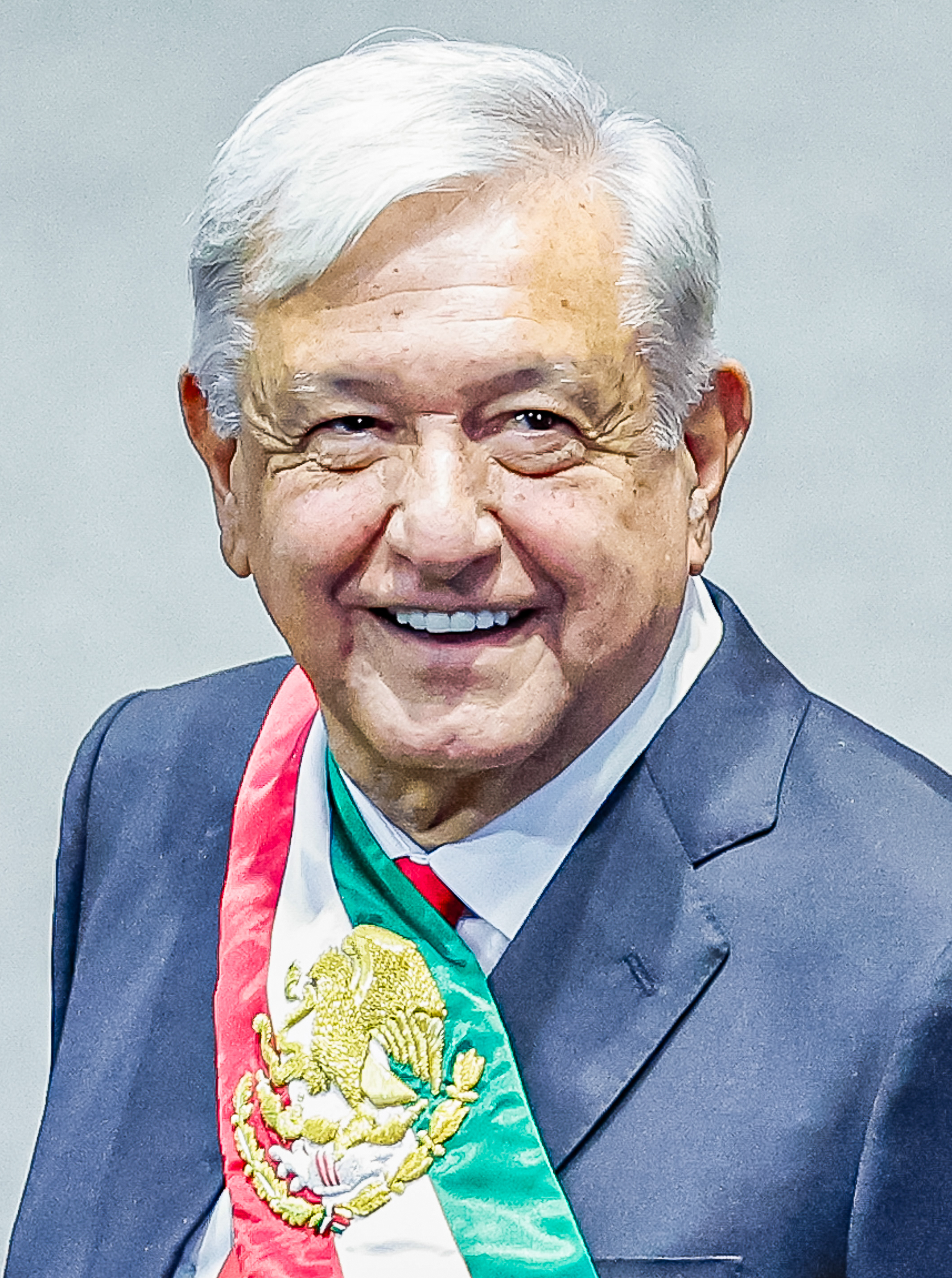
Founder of Morena and 65th president of Mexico, Andrés Manuel López Obrador

In the lead-up to the 2018 general election, López Obrador dismissed this possibility of a grand left-wing coalition, which would have encompassed Morena, the Party of the Democratic Revolution (PRD), the Labor Party (PT), and Citizens' Movement (MC), citing political differences and pointing to the PRD and MC's decisions to continue with their own campaigns rather than withdraw in favor of Morena's candidate during the 2017 State of Mexico gubernatorial election. Instead, a coalition was formed with the PT and the right-wing Christian-conservative Social Encounter Party (PES). The PRD decided to form part of the big-tent Por México al Frente, triggering a mass exodus of its members to Morena, most notably the Izquierda Democrática Nacional (lit. 'National Democratic Left') faction. López Obrador won the presidency with 53 percent of the vote, becoming the first candidate in modern Mexican democratic history to secure an outright majority. Morena and its allies also gained majorities in both chambers of Congress, marking the beginning of what López Obrador termed the "Fourth Transformation" (4T) of public life in Mexico.

The 4T program emphasized anti-corruption initiatives, expansion of social welfare including pensions for the elderly and youth employment programs, austerity for senior public officials, increased public spending on major infrastructure projects like the Tren Maya, Dos Bocas refinery, and the Felipe Ángeles International Airport, energy nationalism with efforts to strengthen state-owned enterprises, and increased state involvement in strategic sectors such as energy. However, the party was limited in entrenching more ambitious or structural elements of the 4T in the constitution, as it did not hold a supermajority in both chambers of Congress.

Morena's coalition grew in 2020 with the inclusion of the Ecologist Green Party of Mexico (PVEM), complementing its existing partnership with the PT. Between 2021 and 2023, the coalition consolidated its influence at the state level, winning gubernatorial elections in fifteen states previously governed by opposition parties. Despite these advances, it again fell short of a congressional supermajority in the 2021 legislative elections. The party also grew rapidly in membership during this period, becoming the largest party in Mexico with over 2.3 million registered members by 2023. The party's growth reflected multiple dynamics: popular electoral appeal to voters attracted by the 4T platform; organized membership drives and local committees; and the incorporation of politicians and officeholders from other parties, particularly from the PRD.

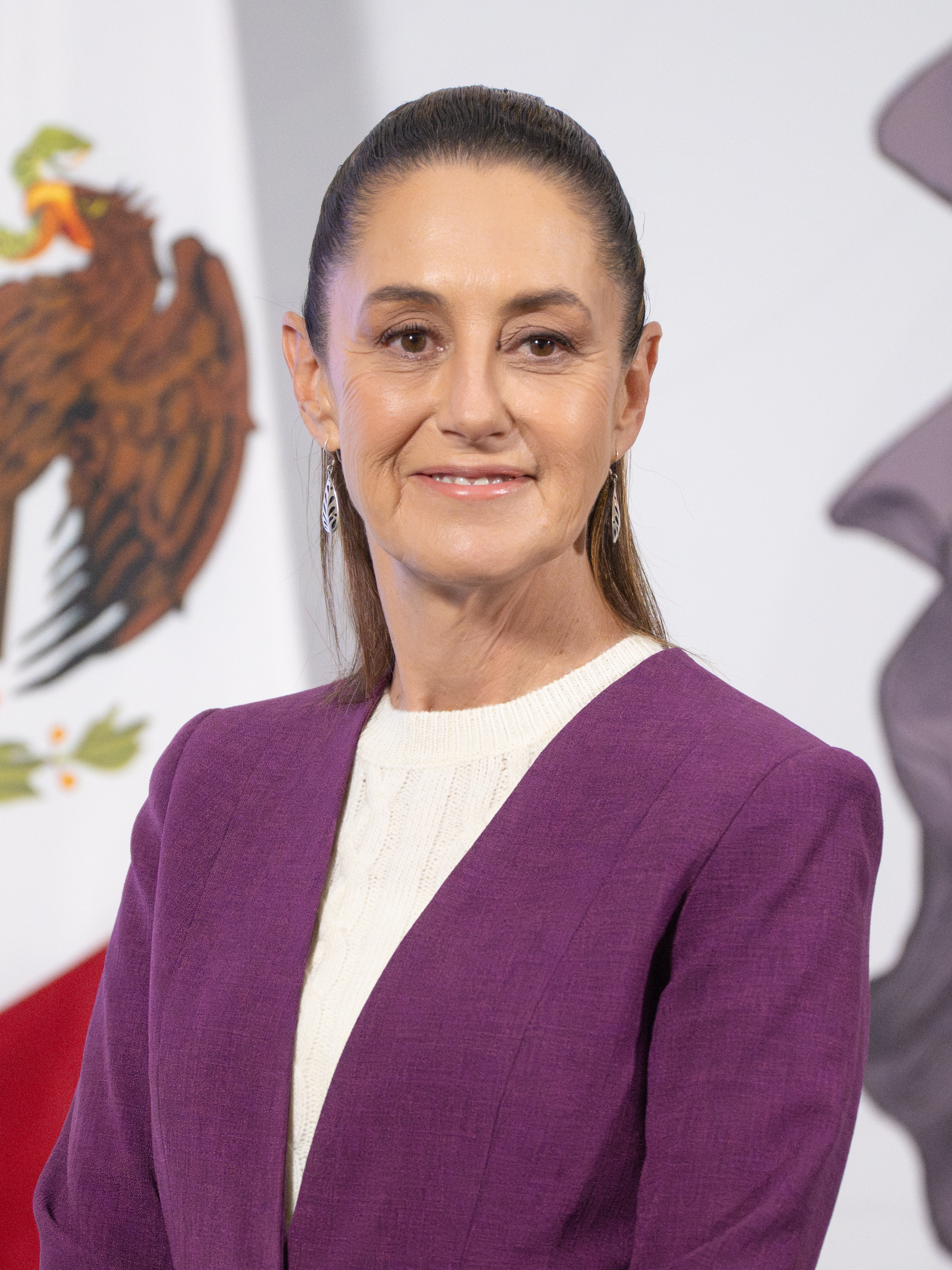
66th president of Mexico, Claudia Sheinbaum

Claudia Sheinbaum, who campaigned on continuing the 4T and advancing López Obrador's proposed constitutional reforms, won the presidency in 2024 with a larger share of the vote than López Obrador had received in 2018, becoming the first woman to hold the office in Mexico's history. The election also gave Morena and its allies a supermajority in the Chamber of Deputies and left them three seats short of a supermajority in the Senate, which they later secured through party defections. With its supermajority, Morena pursued reforms that included minimum wage increases above inflation, expanded healthcare access, constitutional protections for social programs, the elimination of autonomous agencies to centralize government functions, and reforms to the judiciary and electoral systems. During this period, Morena's broad control at the federal and state levels led several analysts and commentators to describe the party as approaching hegemonic status in the Mexican political system.

== Ideology ==
MORENA describes itself as a social democratic party that supports ethnic, religious, cultural, and sexual diversity, respect for human rights, and environmental care. It describes itself as an opponent of the neoliberal economic policies that Mexico began adopting in the 1980s. MORENA states that a new economic model is needed after the failures of neoliberalism in Mexico, which has resulted in increased corruption and inequality. The party supports "development through private and social business, promoting market competition, but exercising State responsibility in the strategic activities which the Constitution states" and proposes "a model that strengthens the inner market, fair wages; a model that promotes syndical freedom and democracy, where the State doesn't intervene in the inner affairs of the trade organizations".

The party opposes the privatization of Pemex and the granting of lands to foreign mining companies who "devastate the lands, pay no taxes, and harm the environment". MORENA also declares itself in favor of improving conditions for the Indigenous peoples of Mexico and implementing the 1996 San Andrés Accords, which were signed by the EZLN and representatives of the government but remained unenforced by President Ernesto Zedillo. The party says it is against the monopolization of the mass media, especially television, by Televisa and TV Azteca, which in 2018 owned 90% of Mexican television.

On social issues, the party's platform embraces a progressive agenda in favor of women's rights and the LGBT community in Mexico, supporting causes such as same-sex marriage and the decriminalization of abortion at the national level. Andrés Manuel López Obrador became the first Mexican president-elect to include the LGBT community in an election victory speech. Almost a year later, on 17 May 2019, López Obrador officially decreed the "National Day against Homophobia, Lesbophobia, Transphobia and Biphobia" in Mexico.

The party advocates an alternative security strategy to the war on drugs, which was implemented in the country during the presidency of Felipe Calderón (2006–2012) and which they oppose, arguing that it is a "failed" strategy that has only sown "insecurity and instability" among Mexicans. Among other things, they advocate the legalization of drugs, such as marijuana, considering that such a proposal would make it possible to find "mechanisms for peace and the reconstruction of the social fabric".

Contrary to other parties of the left, MORENA has not sought to reduce inequality by increasing taxes on the wealthiest. Instead, the party has focused on reducing the pay gap between lower-level employees and high-level government workers' salaries, such as politicians and judges, through austerity measures. The party announced support for a plan by López Obrador to cut salaries of higher-ranking public officials (including the president), lay off up to 70 percent of non-unionized federal workers, and reduce spending by cracking down on corruption and tax fraud. As Article 94 of the Mexican Constitution prohibits reducing the salary of judges at any time during their appointment to maintain judicial independence, judges on the Supreme Court took a 25% pay cut starting in 2019.

=== Pragmatism ===
Various outlets have described MORENA as a big tent party, "not in the strict sense a political party, but an alliance of diverse movements and political actors, whose main reference is its founder and presidential candidate, Andrés Manuel López Obrador". Due to López Obrador's pragmatism, some critics have claimed that MORENA is subject to López Obrador's decisions rather than having a more consistent ideology as a party.

=== Introducing elections to the judiciary ===
In September 2024, then-President Obrador, with a majority in Congress, adopted a judicial reform that involved the direct election of justices, magistrates, and judges at the federal and state levels and reduced justices' tenure from 15 to 12 years. Obrador argued the reform would democratize the Mexican judiciary and reduce corruption in the system.

The reform was highly controversial. Supporters argue, for example, that Mexico's judiciary is characterised by nepotism and favoring oligarchs; the reforms shall make judges more accountable. Critics like the Wilson Center and the Washington Office on Latin America said the reform would increase political influences of the judiciary and erode checks and balances in Mexico's seemingly resurgent single-party political system. The reform resulted in protests and a nationwide strike by judicial sector personnel. Human Rights Watch said a justice reform is necessary due to corruption and a lack of due process in Mexican justice. However, they criticised that the reform won't change the big problem of prosecutors' willingness and capacity to investigate. U.S. and Canadian diplomats issued public criticisms of the reform.

== Structure ==
=== Presidents ===
Officeholder	Term	State
Martí Batres	9 July 2014 – 20 November 2015	Mexico City
Andrés Manuel López Obrador	20 November 2015 – 12 December 2017	Tabasco
Yeidckol Polevnsky	12 December 2017 – 26 January 2020	Mexico City
Alfonso Ramírez Cuéllar	26 January 2020 – 5 November 2020	Zacatecas
Mario Delgado Carrillo	5 November 2020 – 30 September 2024	Colima
Luisa María Alcalde Luján	1 October 2024 – 3 May 2026	Mexico City
Ariadna Montiel Reyes	3 May 2026 –	Mexico City

=== National Executive Committee ===
- Ariadna Montiel Reyes - President
- Carolina Rangel Gracida - General Secretary
- Andrés Manuel López Beltrán - Secretary of Organization
- Óscar del Cueto García - Secretary of Finance
- Camila Martínez Gutiérrez - Secretary of Communication, Press and Propaganda
- Enrique Dussel - Secretary of Education, Training and Political Capacity Building
- Carlos Alberto Figueroa Ibarra - Secretary of Defense of Human Rights
- Janix Liliana Castro Muñoz - Secretary of Studies and National Project
- Manuel Zavala Salazar - Secretary of Cooperativism, Solidarity Economy and Civil and Social Movements
- Aaron Enríquez García - Youth Secretary
- Adriana Grajales Gómez - Secretary of Women
- Bxido Xishe Jara Bolaños - Secretary of Indigenous Peoples
- Artemio Ortiz Hurtado - Secretary of Labor
- Gonzalo Machorro Martínez - Secretary of Production
- Arturo Martínez Nuñez - Secretary of Art and Culture
- Hugo Alberto Martínez Lino - Secretary of Defense of Sovereignty, the Environment and National Heritage
- Carlos Alberto Evangelista Aniceto - Secretary of the Fight against Corruption
- Martín Sandoval Soto - Secretary for the Strengthening of Moral, Spiritual, and Civic Ideas and Values
- Manuel Alejandro Robles Gómez - Secretary of Mexicans Abroad and International Policy
- Adolfo Villarreal Valladares - Secretary of Welfare
- Almendra Negrete - Secretary of Sexual Diversity

=== Publication ===
Morena publishes and distributes the newspaper Regeneración ; its name is taken from the publication of the same name that was clandestinely run by the Flores Magón brothers, journalists critical of the Porfirian regime prior to the Mexican Revolution. Morena defines its news organization as: "a tool of struggle, an agitator of ideas, an organizer of citizens, and a promoter of the revolution of consciences."

== Election results ==
=== Presidential elections ===
Election year	Candidate	Votes	%	Result	Note
2018	Andrés Manuel López Obrador	30,113,483	53.20	✓ Elected	Alliance: Juntos Haremos Historia
2024	Claudia Sheinbaum	35,924,519	61.18	✓ Elected	Alliance: Sigamos Haciendo Historia

=== Legislative elections ===
Chamber of Deputies

Election	Constituency			Party-list			Total (Note: The seat distribution reflects the election results and does not take into account party switches during the legislative term.)	Electoral alliance	Presidency	Position
Election	Votes	%	Seats	Votes	%	Seats	Total	Electoral alliance	Presidency	Position
2015	3,304,736	8.76	14	3,345,712	8.81	21	35 / 500	None	Enrique Peña Nieto	Opposition
2018	20,790,623	38.70	106	20,968,859	38.80	85	191 / 500	Juntos Haremos Historia	Andrés Manuel López Obrador	MORENA–PT–PES majority
2021	16,629,905	35.27	122	16,756,189	35.30	76	198 / 500	Juntos Hacemos Historia	Andrés Manuel López Obrador	MORENA–PT–PVEM majority
2024	3,686,979	6.48	161	24,286,317	42.40	75	236 / 500	Sigamos Haciendo Historia	Claudia Sheinbaum	MORENA–PT–PVEM supermajority

Senate elections

Election	Constituency			Party-list			Total	Electoral alliance	Presidency	Position
Election	Votes	%	Seats	Votes	%	Seats	Total	Electoral alliance	Presidency	Position
2018	21,013,123	39.03	42	21,256,238	39.12	13	55 / 128	Juntos Haremos Historia	Andrés Manuel López Obrador	MORENA–PT–PES majority
2024	7,526,453	13.19	46	24,484,943	42.48	14	60 / 128	Sigamos Haciendo Historia	Claudia Sheinbaum	MORENA–PT–PVEM majority

== See also ==
- Yo Soy 132
- 2012 Mexican elections protests
- #1DMX – 2012 presidential inauguration civil unrest
- Mexican Indignados Movement
- Big tent
- List of political parties in Mexico
- History of democracy in Mexico
- Claudia Sheinbaum
