= José Agustín Ortiz Pinchetti =

Mexican politician (1937–2024)

- Born: 13 May 1937; Mexico City, Mexico
- Died: 3 August 2024 (aged 87); Mexico City, Mexico
- Occupations: Lawyer, jurist, politician
- Political party: PRI (1967–1969); PRD (1999–2012); MORENA (2014–2024)

José Agustín Ortiz Pinchetti (13 May 1937 – 3 August 2024) was a Mexican politician. At different times he was affiliated with the Institutional Revolutionary Party (PRI), the Party of the Democratic Revolution (PRD) and the National Regeneration Movement (Morena).

== Career ==
Ortiz Pinchetti was born in Mexico City in May 1937. He graduated with a law degree from the Escuela Libre de Derecho and completed a master's in economic law at the Ibero-American University (UIA). He taught history and law at the UIA from 1961 to 1993.

He was one of the founders of the Mexico City daily La Jornada in 1984 and remained a regular contributor.

During the term of Andrés Manuel López Obrador as head of government of the Federal District (2000–2003), Ortiz served in his cabinet as secretary of government. In the 2003 mid-term election he was elected to the Chamber of Deputies as a plurinominal deputy for the PRD during the 59th session of Congress.

On 8 February 2019 he was appointed to head the office of the Special Prosecutor for Electoral Offences (FEPADE), an agency of the Attorney-General's office. He remained in that position until his death on 3 August 2024.

== Personal life and death ==
Ortiz Pinchetti was married to Supreme Court justice Loretta Ortiz Ahlf. He died in Mexico City on 3 August 2024, at the age of 87.
