= Margarita Beatriz Luna =

Mexican judge

Justice Margarita Beatriz Luna

Minister of the Supreme Court of Justice of the Nation
- In office February 2004 – 2019
- Preceded by: Juventino Víctor Castro y Castro
- Succeeded by: Yasmín Esquivel Mossa

Justice Margarita Beatriz Luna Ramos (born January 4, 1956) is a Mexican jurist and former member of the Supreme Court of Justice of the Nation (SCJN) February 2004 to February 2019.

Born in San Cristóbal de las Casas, Chiapas, Luna Ramos studied law at the National Autonomous University of Mexico (UNAM).

President Vicente Fox nominated her as a Minister (Associate Justice) of the Supreme Court to fill the vacancy left after the retirement of Juventino Víctor Castro y Castro in 2003. Luna Ramos was confirmed by the Senate with 83 votes in February 2004.

== Studies ==
In her home state of Chiapas she completed her undergraduate studies and started studying law, and finished her graduate studies in the National Autonomous University of Mexico, where she obtained a Masters and Doctoral degree in Constitutional and Administrative Law. During her academic pursuits she obtained several other degrees, which consist of: judicial specialization in the Institute of Judicial Specialization of the Council of the Federal Judicature; the Diploma on International Commercial Arbitration taught at the Escuela Libre de Derecho and the course on American Law at Ibero University.

Legal offices
Preceded by Juventino Víctor Castro y Castro	Minister of the Supreme Court of Justice of the Nation; February 2004–February 2019	Succeeded by Yasmín Esquivel Mossa
