= Yasmín Esquivel Mossa =

Mexican jurist (born 1963)

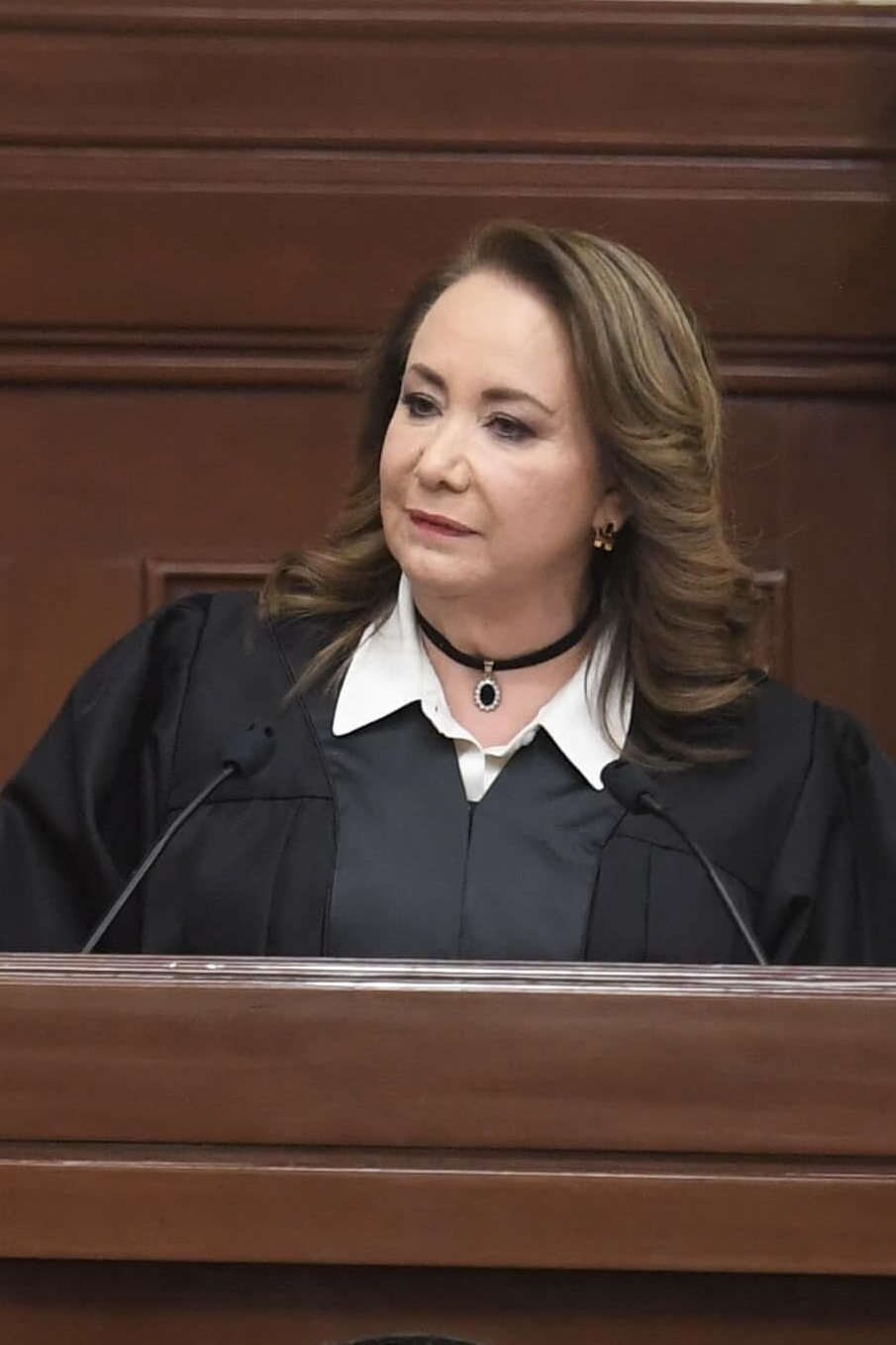
- Esquivel in 2021

Justice of the Supreme Court of Justice of the Nation
- Incumbent
- Assumed office 12 March 2019
- President: Andrés Manuel López Obrador
- Preceded by: Margarita Beatriz Luna

Personal details
- Born: 15 September 1963 (age 63) Mexico City, Mexico
- Spouse: José María Riobóo (c. 2012)
- Education: National Autonomous University of Mexico (LLB); Complutense University of Madrid (PhD); Anahuac University; Panamerican University
- Occupation: Lawyer

Yasmín Esquivel Mossa (born 15 September 1963) is a Mexican lawyer and public official who serves as a justice of the Supreme Court of Justice of the Nation since 2019. Since then, she has served in positions such as account secretary of the presidency of the Superior Agrarian Court or magistrate and president of the Superior Chamber of the Court of Administrative Litigation.

By late 2022 and early 2023, Esquivel's academic standing has been questioned due to multiple accusations of plagiarism allegedly committed in her licentiate and doctoral theses, which Esquivel has denied.

== Career and education ==
Esquivel Mossa studied law at the Escuela Nacional de Estudios Profesionales (ENEP) Aragón (Note: In 2005, the Escuela Nacional de Estudios Profesionales system was renamed Facultad de Estudios Superiores (FES).) of the National Autonomous University of Mexico (UNAM) and earned a licentiate in 1987 and a Doctor of Law degree from the Complutense University of Madrid and the Universidad Anáhuac, which she obtained in 2000. She also did postgraduate work in administrative law and fiscal law in the Mexican financial system at Panamerican University.

As a public official, she began her career in the legal and government subdelegation of the mayor's office in Coyoacán in 1985. She was a civil servant in the office of the Attorney General of the Federal District and in the Institute of the National Housing Fund for Workers. In the legal field, Esquivel served as study and account secretary of the presidency of the Superior Agrarian Court from 2000 to 2004. She was a magistrate of the Superior Chamber of the Court of Administrative Litigation in 2009, and was its president from 2012 to 2015.

=== Justice of the National Supreme Court of Justice ===
Esquivel was selected in 2019 to replace Justice Margarita Beatriz Luna at the National Supreme Court of Justice (SCJN). President Andrés Manuel López Obrador nominated her and she was ratified by the Senate of the Republic. Her selection engendered some disapproval from opposition parties as she is married to José María Riobóo, the president of Grupo Riobóo, one of the main advisers of president López Obrador on infrastructure issues and one of his main contractors during his tenure as head of government of Mexico City between 2000 and 2005, stating that the minister could have potential conflicts of interest. In this regard, Esquivel said that prior to meeting Riobóo, she already had her own professional career as a federal and local magistrate, that she should not be seen as "the wife of" anyone and in the event of any conflict of interest related to Riobóo, she would excuse herself immediately.

On 20 April 2022, Esquivel blocked the delivery of the investigation report of alleged acts of illicit financing by Pío López Obrador, brother of the president of Mexico, to the National Electoral Institute. The report was requested by the institute to the Attorney General of Mexico following a ruling by the Electoral Tribunal of the Judiciary of the Federation to determine the situation of Pío, who the previous year gained notoriety due to the leaking of a 2015 video in which David León Romero, a coordinator from the Ecologist Green Party of Mexico, gave him cash without a specific origin for "the movement". Esquivel determined that the report could not be released because doing so would violate Pío's human rights, including his right to privacy.

Esquivel expressed interest in becoming the first female president of the SCJN.

== Allegations of plagiarism ==
=== Licentiate degree ===
In December 2022, Guillermo Sheridan, scholar and researcher at UNAM, presented an investigation denouncing that Esquivel's licentiate thesis copied verbatim several segments of another student's thesis published the previous year. According to the investigation, Esquivel's thesis Inoperancia del sindicato de los trabajadores de confianza del Artículo 123 Apartado A ("Inoperability of the union of workers of trust under Article 123 Section A"), presented in September 1987, copies 90% of the thesis presented by Édgar Ulises Báez Gutiérrez, student of the Faculty of Law of the university at Ciudad Universitaria campus in July 1986 and titled Inoperancia de los sindicatos en los trabajadores de confianza del Artículo 123 Apartado "A" ("Inoperability of unions for workers of trust under Article 123 Section 'A'"). She denied the accusation, calling the report "totally false". Authorities of the Facultad de Estudios Superiores Aragón announced that they would investigate the report in detail and that if the plagiarism was confirmed, they would act in accordance with institutional regulations. Afterwards, UNAM acknowledged that there was "a high level of coincidence" in both documents and that the university would determine Esquivel's status.

President López Obrador expressed that "any error, any anomaly, committed by Minister Yasmín when she was a student, when she presented her undergraduate thesis, is infinitely less than the damage caused to Mexico by [Enrique] Krauze and the man making the accusation, Sheridan", and that the investigation was carried out to attack his government. Esquivel later shared letters of support and defense of her career from various lawyers and professors, including one from Martha Rodríguez Ortiz, her thesis advisor. Rodríguez considered that the investigation arose from a "misogynist conspiracy" after Esquivel announced her interest in becoming the first woman to preside over the SCJN. Subsequent investigations determined that Rodríguez was an advisor for both theses and that there are at least eight other theses with similar problems. In addition, there is a 1993 thesis (advised by another professor) and a 2010 thesis (advised by Rodríguez) with identical fragments and similar wording to that of Báez.

On Christmas Day, Esquivel announced a complaint for plagiarism with the Mexico City's prosecutor's office, led by Ernestina Godoy Ramos, affirming that she began writing her thesis in 1985 and that she would continue with the process to become president of the SCJN on 2 January 2023. In her complaint to the prosecutor's office, Esquivel mentions the existence of a notarized declaration said by Báez, in which he admits that he plagiarized Esquivel's thesis. After six days of investigation, the prosecution allegedly determined that Esquivel had not plagiarized the thesis based on evidence provided by her. On 2 January, Norma Lucía Piña Hernández was elected as the president of the court. Hours later, the prosecutor's office issued a statement saying that although they received Esquivel's complaint, they determined that they could not proceed with the investigation since the statute of limitations had expired. Subsequently, it was revealed that Báez's notarized admission was a letter purportedly written and signed by him and sent to Rodríguez's home, something Báez denied having done.

On 11 January, UNAM determined that Esquivel "substantially" copied Báez's thesis but that they did not have the authority to remove her bachelor's degree, which remained pending the Secretariat of Education's decision. The university also reported that it would implement technological measures to prevent plagiarism. Báez announced that he would file a lawsuit against Esquivel for plagiarism and for filing false testimony with the city prosecutor's office.

On 13 February 2023, Esquivel requested a writ of amparo against the plagiarism investigation at UNAM, citing that she was not guaranteed "the right to honor, to an adequate defense, to due process, to legal certainty and to legality". In December 2024, a federal court ordered the UNAM not to publish its research on the alleged plagiarism, stating that a degree cannot be revoked from former students.

=== Doctorate degree ===
On 24 February 2023, the Spanish newspaper El País published an investigation into the alleged plagiarism in Esquivel's 2009 doctoral thesis, which was coordinated by the Anáhuac University in collaboration with the Complutense University of Madrid—according to Esquivel's curriculum. In the press release, the journalists found multiple uncited fragments of twelve works by other authors, equivalent to 46.5% of fragments identical to the corresponding original works. Esquivel's attorney attributed the error to quotation marks; when asked about it, López Obrador said it was "not newsworthy". Anáhuac University declined to sanction Esquivel because its guidelines only establish sanctions within the first three years after obtaining a degree. Complutense University, on the other hand, disassociated itself from the thesis and denied any collaboration in her doctoral degree.
