= List of Justices of the Supreme Court of Mexico (1917–1995) =

List of every Mexican Supreme Court of Justice Minister

This list includes general information of all the justices of the Supreme Court of Mexico (Spanish: Suprema Corte de Justicia de la Nación, SCJN) from 1917 to 1995.

The Supreme Court of Mexico is traditionally divided by epochs of the Federal Judicial Weekly; the First through Fourth Epochs are considered "historic jurisprudence", and the "current jurisprudence" spans from the Fifth Period to the present day.

== Epochs of the Federal Judicial Weekly ==
=== Fifth Epoch (1917–1957) ===
Name	Term of office	Place of birth	Date of birth	Date of death	Education
Enrique Colunga Meade	1917–1919	Matamoros, Coahuila	August 1, 1877	December 6, 1946	Colegio del Estado de Guanajuato
Manuel Encarnación Cruz	1917–1919	Tuxtla Gutiérrez, Chiapas	1859	1925	-
Alberto Mariano González	1917–1923	Atotonilco el Grande, Hidalgo	1879	-	Escuela Nacional de Jurisprudencia
Santiago Martínez Alomía	1917–1922	Campeche, Campeche	November 7, 1858	August 15, 1922	Instituto Campechano
Enrique Moreno Pérez	1917–1924 and 1931–1932	Mocorito, Sinaloa	June 15, 1977	January 1, 1932	Colegio Civil Rosales
Victoriano Pimentel	1917–1919	Ario de Rosales, Michoacán	1862	1924	Colegio de San Nicolás
Enrique M. de los Ríos	1917–1919	Mexico City	April 7, 1864	1919	Escuela Nacional de Jurisprudencia
José María Truchuelo	1917–1919 and 1935–1940	Querétaro, Querétaro	April 29, 1880	1953	Universidad de Querétaro
Agustín Urdapilleta Pérez y Ocampo	1917–1923	Campeche, Campeche	July 1, 1859	April 27, 1924	-
Agustín de Valle Peña	1917–1918	Saltillo, Coahuila	January 23, 1861	June 29, 1943	-
Enrique García Parra	1917–1919	-	-	1921	-
Antonio Alcocer Anda	1919–1923	Guadalajara, Jalisco	October 3, 1856	-	-
Benito Flores Martínez	1919–1923	Villa de Fuentes, Coahuila	March 21, 1868	1943	Ateneo Fuente
Ernesto Garza Pérez	1919–1926	Lampazos, Nuevo León	1886	August 4, 1926	-
José María Mena Isassi	1919–1923	Veracruz	1862	1923	-
Ignacio Noris	1919–1923	Sinaloa	September 22, 1871	-	-
Gustavo A. Vicencio	1919–1928	Toluca, State of Mexico	February 19, 1872	April 30, 1930	-
Ricardo Benito Castro Palavicini	1923–1928	Teapa, Tabasco	April 3, 1975	May 24, 1931	-
Francisco Díaz Lombardo Toledano	1923–1935	Mexico City	1865	April 24, 1936	-
Leopoldo Estrada Borja	1923–1928	Apozol, Zacatecas	November 3, 1881	-	-
Jesús Guzmán Vaca	1923–1934	Abasolo, Guanajuato	1891	November 20, 1953	Escuela de Jurisprudencia de Guadalajara
Sabino M. Olea y Leyva	1923–1940	Ajuchitlán, Guerrero	1880	1950	Escuela Nacional de Jurisprudencia
Francisco Modesto Ramírez	1923–1928	Ejutla, Oaxaca	1867	1955	Colegio Católico de la ciudad de Oaxaca
Salvador Urbina y Frías	1923–1934 y 1941–1952	Mexico City	June 4, 1885	September 2, 1961	Escuela Nacional de Jurisprudencia
Teófilo Honorato Orantes	1924–1928	Tuxtla Gutiérrez, Chiapas	-	-	Escuela de Derecho de San Cristóbal de las Casas
Manuel Padilla	1924–1941	Morelia, Michoacán	February 16, 1880	1951	Escuela de Jurisprudencia del Estado de Michoacán
Ricardo Couto	1926–1934	Orizaba, Veracruz	November 27, 1855	-	Escuela Nacional de Jurisprudencia
Elías Monges López	1926–1927	Ciudad del Carmen, Campeche	July 31, 1878	February 11, 1953	-
Arturo Cisneros Canto	1927–1943	Izamal, Yucatán	April 24, 1888	September 18, 1963	Facultad de Jurisprudencia del Estado de Yucatán
Francisco Barba	1928–1941	Jalisco	1880	July 8, 1941	Escuela de Jurisprudencia de Guadalajara
Fernando de la Fuente Sanders	1928–1934 and 1941–1952	Tampico, Tamaulipas	February 10, 1887	1965	Escuela Nacional de Jurisprudencia
Julio García	1928–1934	Guanajuato (city), Guanajuato	January 9, 1858	1940	-
Joaquín Ortega Guzmán	1928–1934	Tenango del Valle, State of Mexico	August 6, 1881	January 6, 1943	Instituto Científico y Literario del Estado de México
Daniel Valencia Valencia	1928–1940	Cotija, Michoacán	December 25, 1886	December 18, 1948	Liceo del Estado de Jalisco
Alberto Vázquez del Mercado	1928–1931	Chilpancingo, Guerrero	March 20, 1893	July 11, 1980	Escuela Nacional de Jurisprudencia
Luis Bazdresch	1934–1941	Mexico City	April 18, 1893	October 31, 1992	Escuela Nacional de Jurisprudencia
Rodolfo Chávez Sánchez	1934–1940 and 1952–1960	Zirándaro, Michoacán	May 8, 1895	February 14, 1995	Colegio de San Nicolás
Octavio Marciano Trigo Cortines	1934–1940	Veracruz (city), Veracruz	November 2, 1885	December 1, 1973	Escuela de Derecho de Xalapa
Agustín Aguirre Garza	1934–1940	Ciudad Mier, Tamaulipas	May 5, 1889	December 21, 1989	Escuela de Jurisprudencia de Ciudad Victoria

=== Sixth Epoch (1957–1968) ===
Name	Term of office	Place of birth	Date of birth	Date of death	Education
Manuel Rivera Silva	1958–1983	Mexico City	April 28, 1913	June 20, 1994	Escuela Nacional de Jurisprudencia
Alberto Régulo Vela Rodríguez	1960–1964	San Buenaventura, Coahuila	April 8, 1901	May 17, 1966	Universidad de San Luis Potosí
Adalberto Padilla Ascencio	1961–1967	San Miguel el Alto, Jalisco	April 21, 1897	January 20, 1990	Universidad de Guadalajara
María Cristina Salmorán de Tamayo	1961–1986	Oaxaca, Oaxaca	August 10, 1918	February 1, 1993	Escuela Nacional de Jurisprudencia
Manuel Yáñez Ruiz	1961–1973	Huehuetoca, Hidalgo	November 16, 1903	September 10, 1985	Escuela Nacional de Jurisprudencia
Raúl Castellano Jiménez	1963–1972	Múzquiz, Coahuila	November 3, 1902	December 3, 1992	Universidad de Guadalajara
Alberto González Blanco	1963–1968	Tuxtla Gutiérrez, Chiapas	July 30, 1898	November 1, 1974	Escuela Nacional de Jurisprudencia
Pedro Guerrero Martínez	1963–1975	Campeche, Campeche	September 16, 1905	December 13, 1985	Escuela de Jurisprudencia de Campeche
Ramón Canedo Aldrete	1964–1977	Maravatío, Michoacán	July 27, 1907	March 17, 1993	Escuela Nacional de Jurisprudencia
José Luis Gutiérrez y Gutiérrez	1964–1967	San Felipe Torres Mochas, Guanajuato	1900	October 28, 1967	Escuela Nacional de Jurisprudencia
Abel Huitrón y Aguado	1964–1976	Jilotepec, State of Mexico	July 20, 1906	April 19, 1976	Escuela Libre de Derecho
Jorge Iñárritu y Ramírez de Aguilar	1964–1986	Mexico City	April 27, 1916	August 8, 1996	Escuela Nacional de Jurisprudencia
Enrique Martínez Ulloa	1964–1975	Ixtlán del Río, Nayarit	September 9, 1905	April 6, 1993	Universidad de Guadalajara
Ezequiel Burguete Farrera	1966–1975	Tuxtla Gutiérrez, Chiapas	March 7, 1907	October 6, 1975	Escuela Nacional de Jurisprudencia
Ernesto Solís López	1966–1975	Puebla, Puebla	March 14, 1905	August 5, 1988	Colegio del Estado de Puebla
Ernesto Aguilar Álvarez	1952–1953 and 1967–1980	Mexico City	January 25, 1910	February 10, 2000	Escuela Nacional de Jurisprudencia
Alberto Orozco Romero	1967–1970	Guadalajara, Jalisco	April 3, 1925	August 28, 2007	Universidad de Guadalajara
Luis Felipe Canudas Orezza	1968–1978	Campeche, Campeche	September 8, 1911	October 21, 1978	Escuela Nacional de Jurisprudencia
Salvador Mondragón Guerra	1968–1979	Querétaro, Querétaro	April 17, 1909	August 18, 2015	Escuela Nacional de Jurisprudencia

=== Seventh Epoch (1969–1988) ===
Name	Term of office	Place of birth	Date of birth	Date of death	Education
José Antonio Capponi Guerrero	1969–1970	Veracruz, Veracruz	April 6, 1905	1977	Universidad del Sureste
Alberto Jiménez Castro	1969–1976	Teocaltiche, Jalisco	April 7, 1906	February 4, 1982	Escuela Nacional de Jurisprudencia
Carlos Antonio del Río Rodríguez	1969–1990	San Antonio, Texas, United States of America	May 10, 1929	September 10, 2009	Escuela Nacional de Jurisprudencia
Euquerio Guerrero López	1970–1976	Guanajuato, Guanajuato	February 20, 1907	March 1, 1990	Universidad de Guanajuato
Alfonso López Aparicio	1970–1985	León, Guanajuato	December 30, 1922	December 8, 1985	Escuela Nacional de Jurisprudencia
José Ramón Palacios Vargas	1970–1985	Puebla, Puebla	March 11, 1916	May 7, 2004	Universidad de Puebla
Jorge Saracho Álvarez	1970–1977	Guadalajara, Jalisco	March 16, 1907	September 28, 1991	-
Eduardo Langle Martínez	1971–1984	Puebla, Puebla	December 18, 1914	June 4, 2007	Escuela Nacional de Jurisprudencia
Arturo Serrano Robles	1972–1981	Tuxtla Gutiérrez, Chiapas	April 15, 1919	December 9, 2020	Escuela Nacional de Jurisprudencia
Raúl Cuevas Mantecón	1973–1988	Mexico City	August 26, 1918	March 7, 2013	Escuela Nacional de Jurisprudencia
David Franco Rodríguez	1973–1985	Morelia, Michoacán	April 10, 1915	June 6, 1989	Universidad Michoacana de San Nicolás de Hidalgo
Antonio Rocha Cordero	1973–1979	San Luis Potosí, San Luis Potosí	April 6, 1912	January 16, 1993	Universidad de San Luis Potosí
Fernando Castellanos Tena	1974–1987	Zamora, Michoacán	June 3, 1917	May 20, 2002	Escuela Nacional de Jurisprudencia
Agustín Téllez Cruces	1974–1982	Guanajuato, Guanajuato	November 15, 1918	January 11, 2024	Escuela Nacional de Jurisprudencia
Livier Ayala Manzo	1975–1976	Villamar, Michoacán	June 7, 1915	October 21, 1976	Escuela Nacional de Jurisprudencia
Juan Moisés Calleja García	1975–1984	Mexico City	September 4, 1918	March 19, 2016	Escuela Nacional de Jurisprudencia
Raúl Lozano Ramírez	1975–1983	Molango, Hidalgo	March 9, 1911	January 28, 2006	Escuela Nacional de Jurisprudencia
Alfonso Abitia Arzapalo	1976–1982	Badiraguato, Sinaloa	April 13, 1912	April 19, 1989	Escuela Nacional de Jurisprudencia
Atanasio González Martínez	1976–1994	Piedras Negras, Coahuila	September 8, 1933	September 26, 2011	Universidad Nacional Autónoma de México
Gloria León Orantes	1976–1984	Tuxtla Gutiérrez, Chiapas	June 6, 1916	August 28, 1984	Escuela Nacional de Jurisprudencia
Jorge Olivera Toro y Cordero	1976–1987	Oaxaca, Oaxaca	August 18, 1917	March 25, 1999	Escuela Nacional de Jurisprudencia
Francisco H. Pavón Vasconcelos	1976–1990	Acayucan, Veracruz	May 27, 1920	May 4, 2010	Escuela Nacional de Jurisprudencia
Roberto Ríos Elizando	1977–1978	Mexico City	April 18, 1918	January 9, 1978	Escuela Nacional de Jurisprudencia
Julio Sánchez Vargas	1977–1983	Omealco, Veracruz	August 17, 1913	December 8, 2005	Escuela Libre de Derecho
Ernesto Díaz Infante Aranda	1978–1990	Mexico City	January 6, 1930	March 17, 2006	Universidad Autónoma de San Luis Potosí
Manuel León Gutiérrez de Velasco y Aranda	1978–1989	Mexico City	March 26, 1919	April 10, 2007	Escuela Nacional de Jurisprudencia
Tarciso Márquez Padilla	1978–1985	Mexico City	December 21, 1915	August 26, 1989	Escuela Nacional de Jurisprudencia
Santiago Rodríguez Roldán	1979–1992	Mexico City	October 6, 1922	November 15, 2000	Escuela Nacional de Jurisprudencia
Enrique Álvarez del Castillo Labastida	1980–1982	Guadalajara, Jalisco	November 13, 1923	May 3, 2006	Escuela Nacional de Jurisprudencia
Luis Fernández Doblado	1981–1994	Tuxpan, Veracruz	April 9, 1926	January 19, 2021	Escuela Nacional de Jurisprudencia
Víctor Manuel Franco Pérez	1982–1988	Guanajuato, Guanajuato	July 28, 1918	December 21, 2009	Escuela Nacional de Jurisprudencia
Guillermo Guzmán Orozco	1982–1993	Mexico City	November 10, 1923	October 21, 2010	Escuela Nacional de Jurisprudencia
Salvador Martínez Rojas	1982–1986	San Luis Potosí, San Luis Potosí	April 20, 1919	September 6, 1986	Escuela Nacional de Jurisprudencia
Mariano Azuela Güitrón	1983–1994 and 1995–2009	Mexico City	April 1, 1936	-	Universidad Nacional Autónoma de México
Felipe López Contreras	1983–1994	Pátzcuaro, Michoacán	April 17, 1935	-	Escuela Libre de Derecho
Fausta Moreno Flores	1983–1994	Puebla, Puebla	-	March 2020	Universidad Nacional Autónoma de México
Carlos de Silva Nava	1984–1995	Mexico City	May 29, 1941	January 2, 2018	Universidad Autónoma de Guadalajara
Victoria Adato Green	1985–1994	Mexico City	February 11, 1939	-	Universidad Nacional Autónoma de México
Noé Castañón León	1985–1994	Berriozábal, Chiapas	April 15, 1948	April 19, 2024	Universidad Nacional Autónoma de México
Sergio Hugo Chapital Gutiérrez	1985–1994	Mexico City	January 7, 1941	-	Universidad Nacional Autónoma de México
Martha Chávez Padrón	1985–1994	Tampico, Tamaulipas	July 31, 1925	August 2, 2017	Escuela Nacional de Jurisprudencia
José Martínez Delgado	1985–1991	Mexico City	May 26, 1921	-	Escuela Nacional de Jurisprudencia
Leopoldino Ortiz Santos	1985–1987	San Luis Potosí, San Luis Potosí	November 16, 1929	March 3, 2004	Universidad Autónoma de San Luis Potosí
Ulises Sergio Schmill Ordóñez	1985–1995	Mexico City	April 4, 1937	18 May 2026	Universidad Nacional Autónoma de México
Juan Díaz Romero	1986–1994 and 1995–2006	Putla, Oaxaca	November 5, 1930	November 17, 2014	Universidad Nacional Autónoma de México
Carlos García Vázquez	1986–1994	Mexico City	February 16, 1930	-	Universidad Nacional Autónoma de México
José Manuel Villagordoa Lozano	1986–1994	Mexico City	February 28, 1930	April 24, 2019	Universidad Nacional Autónoma de México
Samuel Alba Leyva	1987–1994	Durango, Durango	December 12, 1928	October 28, 2014	Escuela Nacional de Jurisprudencia
Irma Cué Sarquis de Duarte	1987–1994	Tierra Blanca, Veracruz	May 7, 1938	-	Universidad Nacional Autónoma de México
Ángel Suárez Torres	1987–1989	Chiapa de Corzo, Chiapas	January 28, 1929	October 6, 1996	Universidad Nacional Autónoma de México

=== Eighth Epoch (1988–1995) ===
Name	Term of office	Place of birth	Date of birth	Date of death	Education
Clementina Gil Guillén de Lester	1988–1994	Mexico City	January 5, 1937	-	Universidad Nacional Autónoma de México
Salvador Rocha Díaz	1988–1993	San Miguel de Allende, Guanajuato	December 21, 1937	July 17, 2011	Universidad Nacional Autónoma de México
Jorge Carpizo McGregor	1989–1992	Campeche, Campeche	April 2, 1944	March 30, 2012	Universidad Nacional Autónoma de México
José Antonio Llanos Duarte	1989–1994	Culiacán, Sinaloa	June 4, 1940	-	Universidad Autónoma de Guadalajara
Ignacio Magaña Cárdenas	1989–1994	Mexico City	April 5, 1942	August 8, 2003	Universidad Autónoma de Puebla
Miguel Ángel García Domínguez	1990–1994	San Miguel de Allende, Guanajuato	December 20, 1931	June 27, 2014	Universidad Nacional Autónoma de México
Luis Gutiérrez Vidal	1990–1994	Mexico City	February 1, 1936	-	Universidad Autónoma de Guadalajara
Ignacio Moisés Cal y Mayor Gutiérrez	1991–1994	Tuxtla Gutiérrez, Chiapas	September 4, 1927	June 13, 2019	Escuela Nacional de Jurisprudencia
José Trinidad Lanz Cárdenas	1991–1994	Campeche, Campeche	January 30, 1932	-	Escuela de Jurisprudencia de Campeche
Miguel Montes García	1992–1994	Degollado, Jalisco	September 25, 1937	September 11, 2020	Universidad de Guanajuato
Carlos Sempé Minvielle	1993–1994	Veracruz, Veracruz	February 8, 1948	-	Universidad Nacional Autónoma de México
José de Jesús Duarte Cano	1994	Uruapan, Michoacán	April 13, 1944	-	Universidad Michoacana de San Nicolás de Hidalgo
Diego Valadés Ríos	1994	Mazatlán, Sinaloa	May 8, 1945	-	Universidad Nacional Autónoma de México
