= José Fernando Franco González-Salas =

Mexican jurist (born 1950)

- Born: December 4, 1950 (age 75)
- Occupation: jurist
- Years active: 2006–2021
- Known for: minister, National Supreme Court of Justice

José Fernando Franco González-Salas (born December 4, 1950) is a Mexican jurist who served as a minister of the National Supreme Court of Justice from 2006 to 2021.

President Vicente Fox nominated him as a Minister (Associate Justice) of the Supreme Court to fill the vacancy left after the retirement of Juan Díaz Romero in November 2006. González Salas was confirmed by the Senate with 94 votes on December 12, 2006. His term ended on December 11, 2021.

Legal offices
| Preceded by Juan Díaz Romero | Minister of the Supreme Court of Justice of the Nation; 2006–2021 | Succeeded by Loretta Ortiz Ahlf |
