= Loretta Ortiz Ahlf =

Mexican jurist (born 1955)

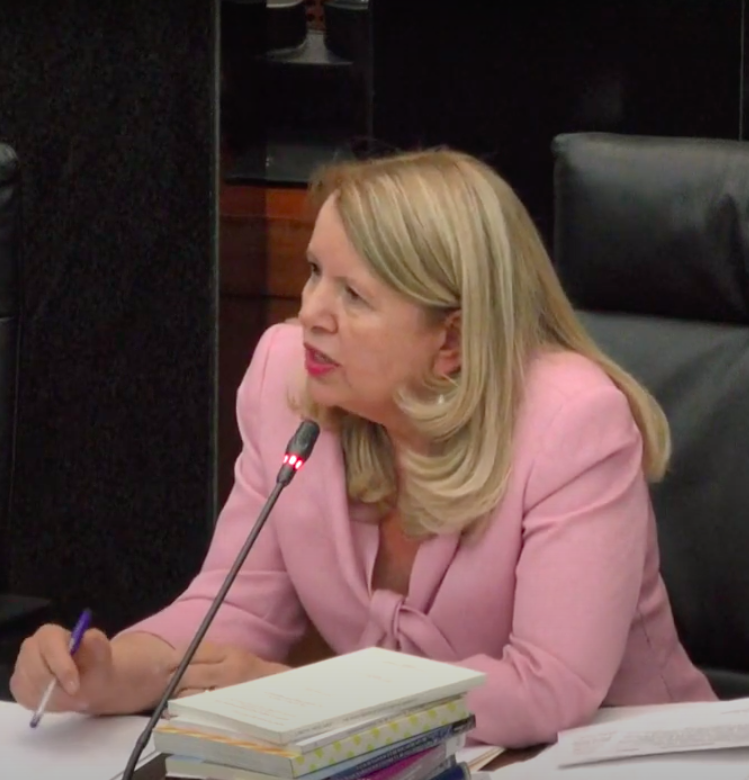

Justice of the Supreme Court of Justice of the Nation
- Incumbent
- Assumed office 12 December 2021
- President: Andrés Manuel López Obrador
- Preceded by: José Fernando Franco González-Salas

Personal details
- Born: 24 February 1955 (age 71) Mexico City, Mexico
- Party: PT (1970s–2014); MORENA (2014–2018)
- Spouse: José Agustín Ortiz Pinchetti
- Education: Escuela Libre de Derecho; Universidad Iberoamericana; National University of Distance Education

Loretta Ortiz Ahlf (born 24 February 1955) is a Mexican politician and lawyer who serves as a justice of the Supreme Court of Justice of the Nation.

== Biography ==
Loretta Ortiz holds a degree in law from the Escuela Libre de Derecho, a master's degree in Human Rights from the Universidad Iberoamericana, and a doctorate in Human Rights and European Community Law from the National University of Distance Education.

She teaches subjects related to law, human rights, and international law at the Escuela Libre de Derecho and the Universidad Iberoamericana, where she also served as coordinator of the Public International Law subsystem from 1987 to 1989 and director of the law department from 1998 to 2007. She has been a member of the Mexican Bar Association since 1985. She has been the only Mexican honored by The Hague Academy of International Law in being invited as a professor of Public International Law at the institution.

As a congresswoman, Ortiz was affiliated with the National Regeneration Movement (formerly with the Labor Party (PT)). In the 2012 general election, she was elected to the Chamber of Deputies as a plurinominal deputy. Elected for the PT, she switched her allegiance to Morena on 3 February 2015.

In 2021, she was nominated by President Andrés Manuel López Obrador as a candidate for the Supreme Court of Justice of the Nation, intended to take the seat of Justice José Fernando Franco González-Salas. She was included in the list among Bernardo Bátiz and Verónica de Gyvés. On 23 November, she was appointed as a justice by the Senate, effective on 12 December 2021. Ortiz is the fourth female on the court and the fourth nominated by López Obrador.
