= Giovanni Azael Figueroa Mejía =

Mexican lawyer and researcher

Justice of the Supreme Court of Justice of the Nation
- Incumbent
- Assumed office 1 September 2025

Personal details
- Born: Giovanni Azael Figueroa Mejía; 7 August 1978 (age 47) Tuxpan, Nayarit, Mexico
- Education: Autonomous University of Nayarit (LLB); Complutense University of Madrid (JD)

Giovanni Azael Figueroa Mejía (born 7 August 1978) a Mexican lawyer, researcher and educator who has served since 2025 as Justice of the Supreme Court of Justice of the Nation after he was elected at 2025 Mexican judicial elections.

== Education ==
Figueroa earned his law degree from the Autonomous University of Nayarit before completing a master's degree in advanced constitutional law studies and a Ph.D. in constitutional law at the Complutense University of Madrid. His academic career includes teaching at the undergraduate, master's, and doctoral levels. From 2016 to 2022, he served as the head of the Master's program in human rights at the Universidad Iberoamericana.

== Career ==
Prior being a Supreme Court justice, he was Secretary of Agreements in the Presidency of the Superior Court of Justice of the State of Nayarit in 2002, director of the Judicial School of the Judicial Branch of the State of Nayarit from 2011 to 2013, Director of Human Rights at the Federal Judiciary Council in 2013, and advisor to the Presidency of the Superior Chamber of the Electoral Court of the Federal Judiciary from 2014 to 2015. As a jurist Figueroa Mejía authored three books.

== Election as a Supreme Court justice ==
On 1 June 2025, federal elections were held for the judiciary, in which the members of the Supreme Court of Justice of the Nation were elected. Figueroa obtained 3,655,000 votes, making him the male candidate with the most votes after the President of the Court, Hugo Aguilar Ortiz.

== Works ==
- Las sentencias constitucionales atípicas en el derecho comparado y en la acción de inconstitucionalidad mexicana (Porrúa, 2011)
- Influencia de la doctrina en las decisiones de la Suprema Corte de Justicia mexicana (Porrúa, 2017)
- Estudios sobre control constitucional y convencional (Porrúa, 2020)
