= Genaro David Góngora =

Mexican jurist (born 1937)

Genaro Góngora Pimentel
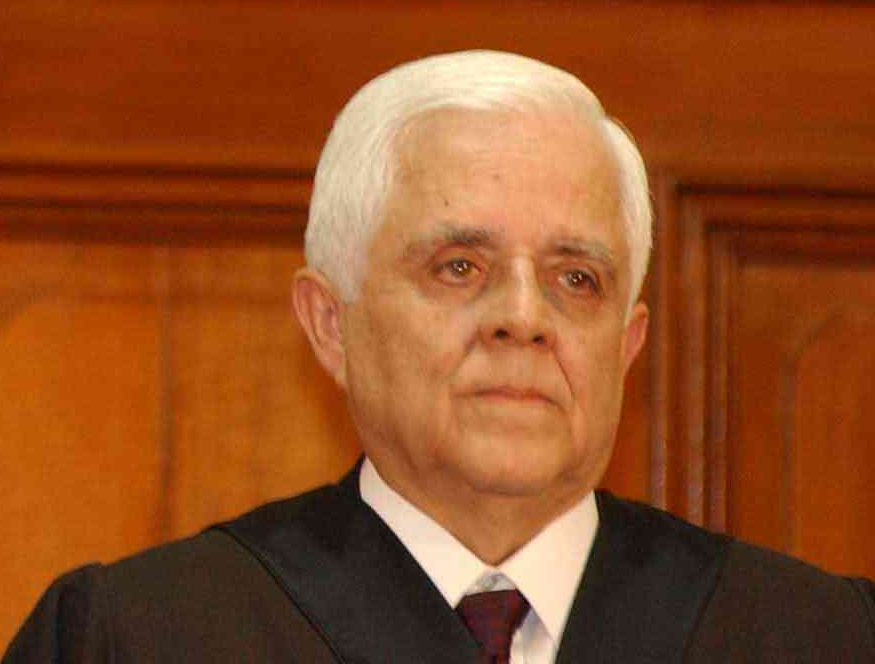

President of the Supreme Court of Justice of the Nation
- In office 4 January 1999 – 2 January 2003
- Preceded by: José Vicente Aguinaco Alemán
- Succeeded by: Mariano Azuela Güitrón

Associate Justice of the Supreme Court of Justice of the Nation
- In office 26 January 1995 – 30 November 2009
- Nominated by: Ernesto Zedillo
- Appointed by: Senate of the Republic
- Preceded by: New Seat
- Succeeded by: Arturo Zaldívar

Personal details
- Born: Genaro David Góngora Pimentel; 8 September 1937 (age 89) Chihuahua, Chihuahua, Mexico
- Education: National Autonomous University of Mexico

Genaro David Góngora Pimentel (born 8 September 1937) is a Mexican jurist who was a member of the Supreme Court of Justice of the Nation (SCJN) from 1995 to 2009. He was the President (Chief Justice) of the court from 1999 to 2003.

Góngora Pimentel studied law at the National Autonomous University of Mexico in Mexico City, where he later obtained a doctorate.

In 1995, President Ernesto Zedillo nominated him as a Minister (Associate Justice) of the Supreme Court. His appointment was confirmed by the Senate on 26 January 1995.

== Early life and education ==
Góngora Pimentel was born on September 8, 1937 in Chihuahua. He completed his primary and secondary schools in Ensenada, Baja California, and Hermosillo, Sonora.

On October 1, 1963, he earned a Bachelor of Laws degree from the National Autonomous University of Mexico (UNAM) with a thesis titled From the "Maritime Agency". He later obtained a Doctorate in Law from the same university on December 5, 2006, submitting a thesis titled "The Jurisdictional Vote".

== Professional experience ==
- "Secretario de Estudio y Cuenta", commissioned to the Supreme Court of Justice on January 2. 1969.
- District Judge in Administrative Matters in Mexico City, from 1972 to 1978.
- Magistrate in the Collegiate Tribunal of the Fifth Circuit residing in Hermosillo, Sonora, from May to July, 1978.
- Magistrate in the Third Collegiate Tribunal on Civil Matters and the Third Collegiate Tribunal on Administrative Matters, both from the First Circuit, from 1978 to 1995.
- Associate Justice of the Supreme Court of Justice of the Nation. Appointed by the Senate of the Republic on January 26, 1995, for a tenure in office of 15 years.
- President of the Segunda Sala (Second Chamber, labor and administrative matters) of the Supreme Court of Justice of the Nation, from January, 1996 to December, 1997.
- Chief Justice of the Supreme Court of Justice of the Nation and of The Federal Judicature Council (Federal Judiciary Council), elected from January 4, 1999, to December 31, 2002.
- Associate Justice of the Segunda Sala (Second Chamber) of The Supreme Court of Justice of the Nation.

== Other posts ==
- "Secretario B de Acuerdos at Oficina de Acuerdos" of the Fiscal Tribunal of the Federation, from 1964 to 1969.
- Secretario General de Acuerdos in the same Tribunal, 1966.
- Legal Advisor of the General Direction of Merchant Navy, 1968 to 1969.
- Vocal Secretary of the National Port Coordination Committee, 1971.

== Teaching experience ==
For more than 30 years, he has been a professor of Maritime, Merchant and Amparo Law in the Faculty of Law of the Universidad Nacional Autónoma de México, in Mexico City. Professor of Fiscal Law, at the Anáhuac University, he has taught at the Judicial Specialization Institute, of the Judicial Power of the Federation.

== Publications ==
- "Introduction to the Study of Amparo Trial", 10th edition, 2005.
- "The Suspension in Administrative Matters", 9th edition, 2005.
- "The Rights We Have: The Justice We Expect", 2000.
- "Evolution of Kidnapping in Mexico and the Decisions of the Judicial Power of the Federation in the Matter", 2nd edition, 2005.
- "The Veto on the Federation’s Budget of Expenditure", available since December 2005.

He has published in collaboration with Dr. Acosta Romero:

- "Political Constitution of the United States of Mexico; Doctrine, Legislation and Jurisprudence."
- "Amparo Law; Legislation, Jurisprudence and Doctrine"
- "Federal Code of Civil Procedures. Organic Law of the Judicial Federal Power of the Federation. Legislation, Jurisprudence and Doctrine."

Coauthor with Magistrate María Guadalupe Saucedo Zavala, of the following works;

- "Suspension of the Claimed Act. Alphabetical Compilation of Jurisprudential Thesis and Precedents." 7th Edition, 2005
- "Amparo Law. Jurisprudential Doctrine", in two Tomes and four Volumes, 6th Edition, 2001. Updated Tome I, First and Second Part, 7th Edition, 2004

Invited by the XLVI Legislature to integrate comments, background and path of the Constitutional Articles. "The Mexican People’s Rights. Mexico throughout its Constitutions"

Has participated in the making of the Mexican Juridical Dictionary on Merchant Law, edited by UNAM's Institute of Juridical Investigation, since 1981.

Due to the installation of a Circle of Juridical Studies "Genaro Góngora Pimentel", has contributed to the compilation of a series of published analysis, such as: "The Juridical Work and the Judicature".

== Distinctions ==
- The H. Technical Council of UNAM appointed him recipient of the Medal of the Teaching Merit "Prima de Leyes Instituta" in 1992.
- The National Association of Lawyers, member of L'Union Internationale Des Avocats, Inter American Bar Association and Unión Iberoamericana de Abogados awarded him with "The Great Cross of Judicial Merit", given to him by the President of the Republic on July 13, 1992.
- The Colegio de Abogados "Foro de México" A. C. honoured him with "Presea al Mérito Judicial" conferred by the President of the Republic on July 12, 1994.
- The Postgraduate Studies Division from National Autonomous University of Mexico bestowed on him the "Juridical Academic Recognition: Ignacio L. Vallarta" in 1995.
- The LVII Legislature gave him the award Belisario Domínguez award in October, 1999.
- The Romanian Government distinguished him with the "Appointment of the Order of the Star of Romania in the grade of Grand Cross" on November 19, 2001.
- The Supreme Court of Nicaragua paid homage for his valuable contribution to the strengthening of ties between the Judicial Powers in Mexico and Nicaragua in 2002.
- He was granted a degree of Doctor Honoris Causa for his exceptional achievements as a Teacher, Juridical Researcher and as a consolidator of the Federal Judicial Power in Mexico by Universidad Juárez Autónoma de Tabasco on April 11, 2002.
- The High of Justice in Puebla, awarded him with the Golden Medal "Abogado José María Lafragua Ibarra" in recognition to his distinguished professional path and his patriotic and continuous effort in favor of Justice on July 5, 2002.
- The Mayor of the City of Antigua Guatemala declared him "Distinguished Visitor" on August 2, 2002.
- He inaugurated the library "Justice Genaro David Góngora Pimentel" in "Escuela de Municipalistas" in Guanajuato, Guanajuato, on October 10, 2002.
- The Institute of Juridical Science of UNAM Alumni Campus Aragón A.C. granted him the "Tepantlato Award" at the Alcazar of Chapultepec Castle, on its XIII Anniversary on October 30, 2002.
- The Government of the Kingdom of Spain recognized him with the "Gran Cruz" of the Order of Isabel la Católica on November 8, 2002.
- Barra Queretana Colegio de Abogados A.C. acknowledged his magnificent dissertation of "Una Inquietud y Tres Historias" on April 2, 2003.
- The Circle of Juridical Studies "Genaro David Góngora Pimentel" was created and its members took oath in Chihuahua, Chihuahua, on June 16, 2004.
- Universidad Nacional Autónoma de Nuevo León, through its Law and Criminology Faculty, acknowledged him for the presentation of his work: "Evolution of Kidnapping in Mexico and the Decisions of the Judicial Power of the Federation in the Matter" on August 18, 2004.
- He was appointed as an honorary member of "Liga Mundial de Abogados Ambientalistas A.C." and awarded with the Venera decoration "IUS AMBIENS" on October 6, 2004.
- Associate Justice Genaro David Góngora Pimentel was recognized for his 35-year service to the Judicial Power of the Federation on November 23, 2004.
- The National Institute of the Author's Copyright and the Law Faculty of the UNAM, honoured him with a distinction due to the National Program of Recognition to Professors of Public Universities with written works on March 11, 2005.
- Universidad Contemporánea of the City of Querétaro installed the Chapter of the Fraternity Phi Delta Phi Góngora Pimentel Inn, on April 27, 2005.
- The Revolutionary Confederation of Workers and Peasants awarded him for "Impartición de Justicia" merits on July 12, 2005.
- Colegio de Abogados "Genaro David Góngora Pimentel" Playas de Rosarito A.C. appointed him as the First Honorary Member for his outstanding contribution to Justice in the Nation and therefore maintaining a State based on the Rule of Law, on September 8, 2005.
- The High Tribunal of the State of Chihuahua, on the occasion of its 180 Anniversary, honored him for his outstanding and brilliant juridical path, and filling Chihuahua State with pride, on November 7, 2005.

Legal offices
Preceded by José Vicente Aguinaco Alemán	President of the Supreme Court of Justice of the Nation; January 4, 1999 – January 2, 2003	Succeeded by Mariano Azuela Güitrón
