= Luis María Aguilar Morales =

Mexican jurist (born 1949)

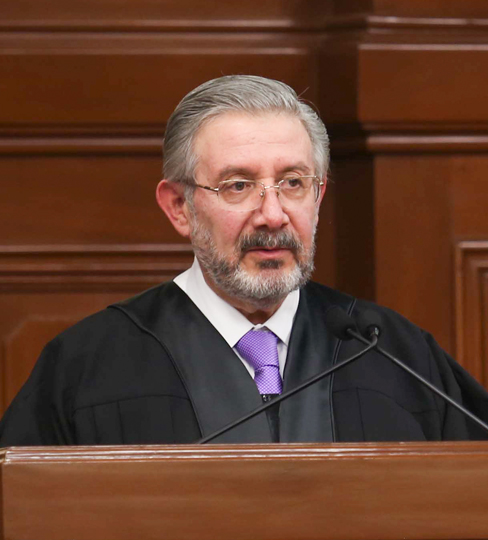
- Justice Aguilar Morales in 2016

President of the Supreme Court of Justice of the Nation
- In office 3 January 2015 – 31 December 2018
- Preceded by: Juan N. Silva Meza
- Succeeded by: Arturo Zaldívar Lelo de Larrea

Justice of the Supreme Court of Justice of the Nation
- In office 1 December 2009 – 30 November 2024
- Nominated by: Felipe Calderón
- Preceded by: Mariano Azuela Güitrón
- Succeeded by: Seat abolished

Personal details
- Born: Luis María Aguilar Morales; 4 November 1949 (age 75) Mexico City, Mexico
- Education: National Autonomous University of Mexico (LLB)

Luis María Aguilar Morales (born 4 November 1949) is a Mexican jurist who served as a member of the Supreme Court of Justice of the Nation from 2009 to 2024. He was president of the Court between January 2015 and December 2018.

Born in Mexico City, Aguilar Morales studied law at the National Autonomous University of Mexico.

== Supreme Court Nomination ==
In 2009, President Felipe Calderón nominated him as a Minister (associate justice) of the Supreme Court to fill the vacancy left after the retirement of Mariano Azuela Guitron. Aguilar was confirmed by the Senate with 91 votes on 1 December 2009.

Legal offices
Preceded by Mariano Azuela Guitron	Justice of the Supreme Court of Justice of the Nation; 2009–2024	Seat abolished (see 2024 Mexican judicial reform)
