= Juan N. Silva Meza =

Mexican jurist (born 1944)

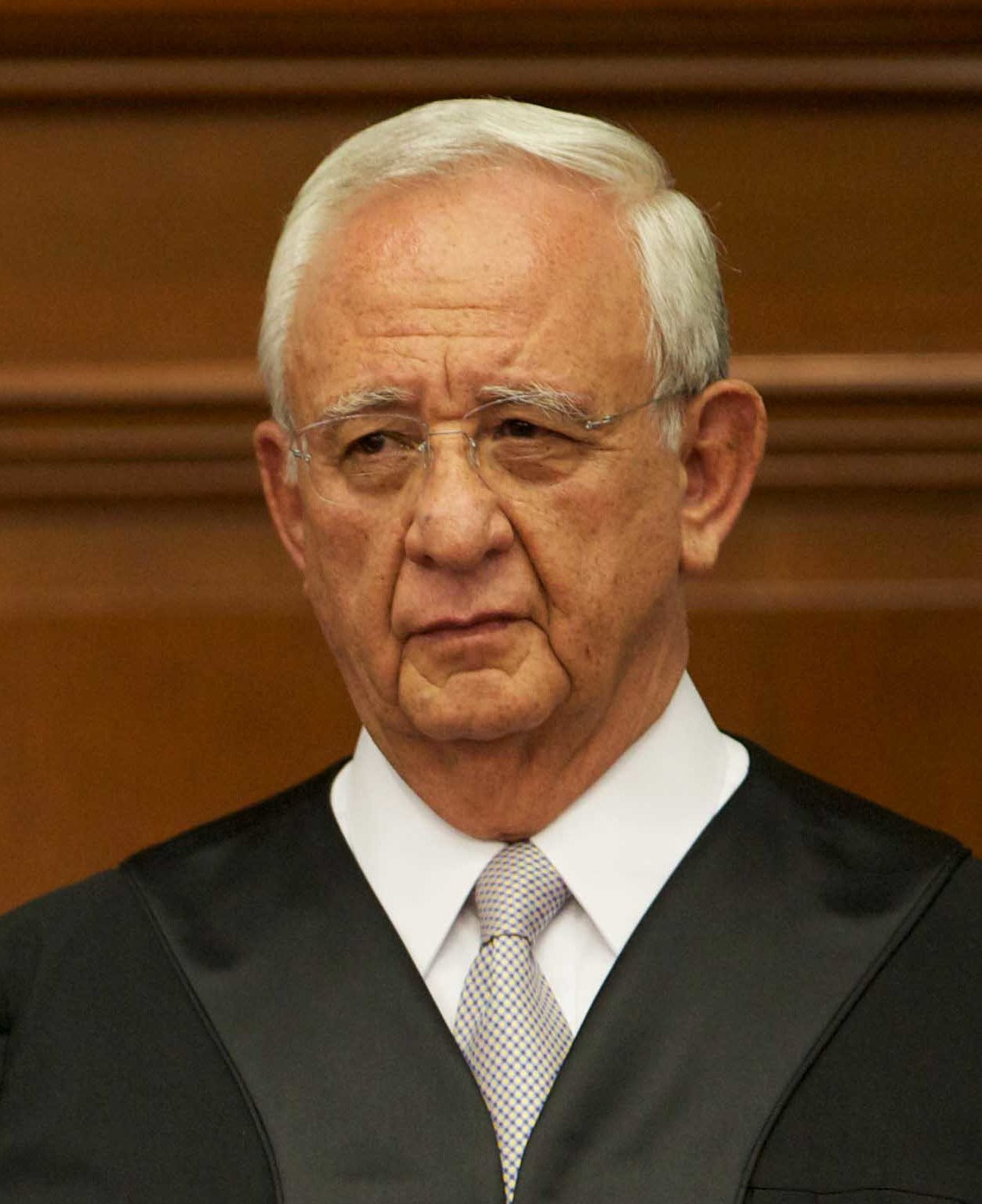

President of the Supreme Court of Justice of the Nation
- In office 3 January 2011 – 31 December 2014
- Preceded by: Guillermo Iberio Ortiz Mayagoitia
- Succeeded by: Luis María Aguilar Morales

Associate Justice of the Supreme Court of Justice of the Nation
- In office 26 January 1995 – 1 December 2015
- Nominated by: Ernesto Zedillo
- Succeeded by: Javier Laynez Potisek

Personal details
- Born: 13 July 1944 (age 82) Mexico City, Mexico
- Education: National Autonomous University of Mexico (LLB)

Juan Nepomuceno Silva Meza (born 13 September 1944) is a Mexican jurist. He served as an Associate Justice (ministro) of the Supreme Court of Justice of the Nation from 26 January 1995 until 1 December 2015, having previously served extensively elsewhere in the judiciary, including the Federal Electoral Tribunal. On 3 January 2011, he was elected Chief Justice for a term that ended on 31 December 2014.

== Life ==
Born in Mexico City, he earned his law degree at the National Autonomous University of Mexico (UNAM). He was nominated to the Supreme Court by President Ernesto Zedillo in December 1994 and ratified by the Senate in January 1995. He is considered to belong to the Court's liberal wing. Silva was Chief Justice of Mexico's Supreme Court of Justice when the court received a United Nations Prize in the Field of Human Rights for 2013.

In January 2016 he joined the Faculty of Law of UNAM.

== Publications ==
- Silva Meza, Juan N. (2000). Hacia la nueva Ley de Amparo. Discursos de los Ministros de la Suprema Corte. Vol. 7. México: Poder Judicial de la Federación. ISBN 9789707120532.
- La confianza se gana día a día. Discursos de los Ministros de la Suprema Corte. Vol. 11. México: Poder Judicial de la Federación. 2001. ISBN 9789707120570.
- La interpretación constitucional en el marco de la justicia constitucional y la nueva relación entre poderes. Estudios Jurídicos. Vol. 8. México: Universidad Nacional Autónoma de México. 2002. ISBN 9703201415.
- Efectos de las sentencias de la Suprema Corte de Justicia de la Nación en los procesos constitucionales. 10 años de la Novena Época. México: Poder Judicial de la Federación. 2005. ISBN 9789707124875.
- Derechos fundamentales: algunos retos institucionales para el siglo XXI. Estudios Jurídicos. Vol. 52. México: Universidad Nacional Autónoma de México. 2007. ISBN 9789703247165.
- — (2009). Derechos fundamentales: bases para la reconstrucción de la jurisprudencia constitucional. México: Porrúa. ISBN 978-6070902765.
