= Fauzi Hamdan =

Mexican lawyer and politician

- Born: 17 April 1943 (age 83); Mexico City, Mexico
- Education: Escuela Libre de Derecho
- Occupations: Lawyer and politician
- Political party: PAN

Fauzi Hamdan Amad (born 17 April 1943) is a Mexican lawyer and politician affiliated with the National Action Party. He is from a Lebanese father (Bater Ech-Chouf) and a Lebanese mother (Barouk). As of 2014 he served as Senator of the LVIII and LIX Legislatures of the Mexican Congress representing the Federal District and as Deputy of the LV and LVII Legislatures. He is a former rector of the Escuela Libre de Derecho.
