= Alfredo Gutiérrez Ortiz Mena =

Mexican lawyer (born 1969)

- Born: 14 October 1969 (age 56); Cuernavaca, Morelos, Mexico
- Education: UNAM (LL.B.); Harvard Law School (LL.M.)

Alfredo Gutiérrez Ortiz Mena (Note: In this Spanish name, the first or paternal surname is Gutiérrez and the second or maternal family name is Ortiz Mena. Gutiérrez Ortiz Mena is the grandson of the economist Antonio Ortiz Mena.) (born 14 October 1969) is a Mexican jurist. He served as a Justice of the Supreme Court of Justice of the Nation (SCJN) from December 2012 to 31 August 2025. Since September 2025, he has served as the Henry J. Steiner Lecturer in Human Rights at Harvard Law School.

== Early life and education ==
Alfredo Gutiérrez Ortiz Mena was born in Cuernavaca, Morelos, in 1969. He holds a Bachelor of Laws degree from the National Autonomous University of Mexico (UNAM) and a Master of Laws degree from Harvard Law School.

== Private legal practice (1995–2008) ==
Before entering public service, Gutiérrez Ortiz Mena worked in private legal practice from 1995 to 2008. He held positions at firms including Covington & Burling LLP, Ortiz, Sainz y Tron S.C., Holland & Knight-Gallastegui y Lozano S.C., and White & Case S.C. His practice focused on tax law, international trade, and administrative and tax litigation.

== Tax Administration Service (2003–2012) ==
Gutiérrez Ortiz Mena held several positions at the Tax Administration Service (SAT), each confirmed by the Senate: Chief Legal Officer (7 December 2003), General Administrator for Large Taxpayers (11 December 2006), and Chief of the SAT (9 July 2008). He served as Chief of the SAT until November 2012.

During his tenure, the SAT introduced electronic invoicing to modernise tax administration. The project received the Tax Administration Innovation Award from the Inter-American Center of Tax Administrations.

The SAT also established the Mexican Single Window for Foreign Trade, intended to streamline customs procedures. In 2010, the SAT received the Yolanda Benítez Award from the World Customs Organization for its work combating piracy and counterfeiting.

The Organisation for Economic Co-operation and Development (OECD) recognised Mexico as among its top-performing member countries in tax refund turnaround times during this period.

In 2011, Gutiérrez Ortiz Mena was named one of the 50 Biggest Influencers in Tax by International Tax Review.

== Supreme Court tenure (2012–2025) ==
President Felipe Calderón nominated Gutiérrez Ortiz Mena to the Supreme Court as part of a shortlist submitted to the Senate. The Senate appointed him as Justice on 1 December 2012.

=== Constitutional interpretation and access to justice ===
During his tenure, Gutiérrez Ortiz Mena advocated interpreting the Constitution in harmony with international human rights treaties. He also advocated for a broad interpretation of legal standing to expand individuals' access to the courts.

=== Gender perspective ===
Gutiérrez Ortiz Mena was among the first justices to apply a gender perspective systematically in Mexican jurisprudence. Cases in which he applied this framework involved child custody, workplace equality, and gender-based violence. In the Mariana Lima Buendía case, he proposed standards requiring prosecutors to investigate with a gender perspective. The Karla Pontigo case addressed the right to truth. Additional rulings established that women's criminal responsibility must be assessed free of stereotypes and with attention to the structural conditions shaping their circumstances.

In rulings on equality and non-discrimination, he proposed invalidating statutes that he argued perpetuated gender stereotypes, and developed standards in family law concerning the recognition of cohabitants' rights. He supported reproductive rights, including access to abortion, and argued for the invalidity of criminal provisions penalising abortion on the grounds of personal autonomy.

=== LGBTQ+ rights ===
On matters concerning the LGBTQ+ community, Gutiérrez Ortiz Mena supported marriage equality and the removal of norms restricting marriage and adoption for same-sex couples. He issued rulings on access to gender-affirming surgeries, addressing health, identity, and autonomy rights. He also addressed the regulation of gestational surrogacy under the principle of non-discrimination.

=== Indigenous and Afro-Mexican rights ===
Gutiérrez Ortiz Mena contributed to developing guidelines for prior consultation with Indigenous and Afro-Mexican communities, addressing their right to participate in decisions affecting their territories and resources. He also established standards for affirmative actions enabling Indigenous communities to access media platforms.

=== Migration ===
On migration, he issued decisions on the rights of undocumented migrants, including access to an official registry (CURP) and protective measures for children in migrant caravans and adolescent refugees and asylum seekers.

=== Criminal law ===
In criminal law, Gutiérrez Ortiz Mena defended the presumption of innocence and questioned the constitutionality of mandatory pre-trial detention. His rulings addressed the standard for adequate defence, the right to cross-examine witnesses, suggestive identification procedures, and the constitutional prohibition of torture—defining it as encompassing both interrogation and broader intimidation.

=== Enforced disappearances ===
A ruling authored by Gutiérrez Ortiz Mena affirmed the obligation of all authorities to comply with urgent actions issued by the United Nations Committee on Enforced Disappearances (CED), and recognised the right to search for disappeared persons. The Committee cited this ruling for acknowledging the binding nature of its directives and establishing "the urgent obligation to search for disappeared persons with all available institutional resources."

=== Administrative law ===
In administrative law, Gutiérrez Ortiz Mena supported granting deference to specialised agencies in their interpretation of the law, limiting that deference when human rights are at stake. A related precedent recognised a Regulatory State principle establishing a differentiated standard of review for autonomous constitutional bodies, protecting them from interference by the legislative and executive branches.

=== Other areas ===
Other rulings addressed consular assistance, the best interests of children and adolescents, the rights of persons with disabilities, freedom of speech, non-contractual liability for medical negligence, and reparations through amparo proceedings. He also supported precedents on judicial independence, including the principles of judicial immovability and stability in office.

=== Departure ===
In 2024, Gutiérrez Ortiz Mena announced that he would not compete in the 2025 judicial election. His term on the Supreme Court concluded in August 2025.

== Environmental record ==
During his time at the SAT, Gutiérrez Ortiz Mena led the digitisation of administrative processes, reducing the use of paper. He promoted the construction of SAT buildings with LEED certification, including a facility in Mexicali, Baja California. In 2016, the Organization of American States (OAS) appointed him a Goodwill Ambassador for Environmental Justice in the Americas.

As a Supreme Court justice, he issued rulings on environmental protection. These included the principle that environmental cases require a differentiated approach, applying in dubio pro natura, prevention, and precaution. He held that suspension rules in amparo cases must align with the principles of the Escazú Agreement, allowing such measures to serve as tools for preventing, mitigating, or repairing environmental damage.

His environmental rulings also addressed the protection of vulnerable ecosystems, state responsibility in pollution cases, and prior consultation with Indigenous communities affected by development projects.

== Publications ==
- Translator of Making Our Democracy Work: A Judge's View by Stephen Breyer, with preface, published by the Fondo de Cultura Económica in 2018.

== Awards ==
- Traphagen Award, Harvard University, as a distinguished alumnus (2017).
