= Arturo Zaldívar Lelo de Larrea =

Mexican jurist (born 1959)

Arturo Zaldívar
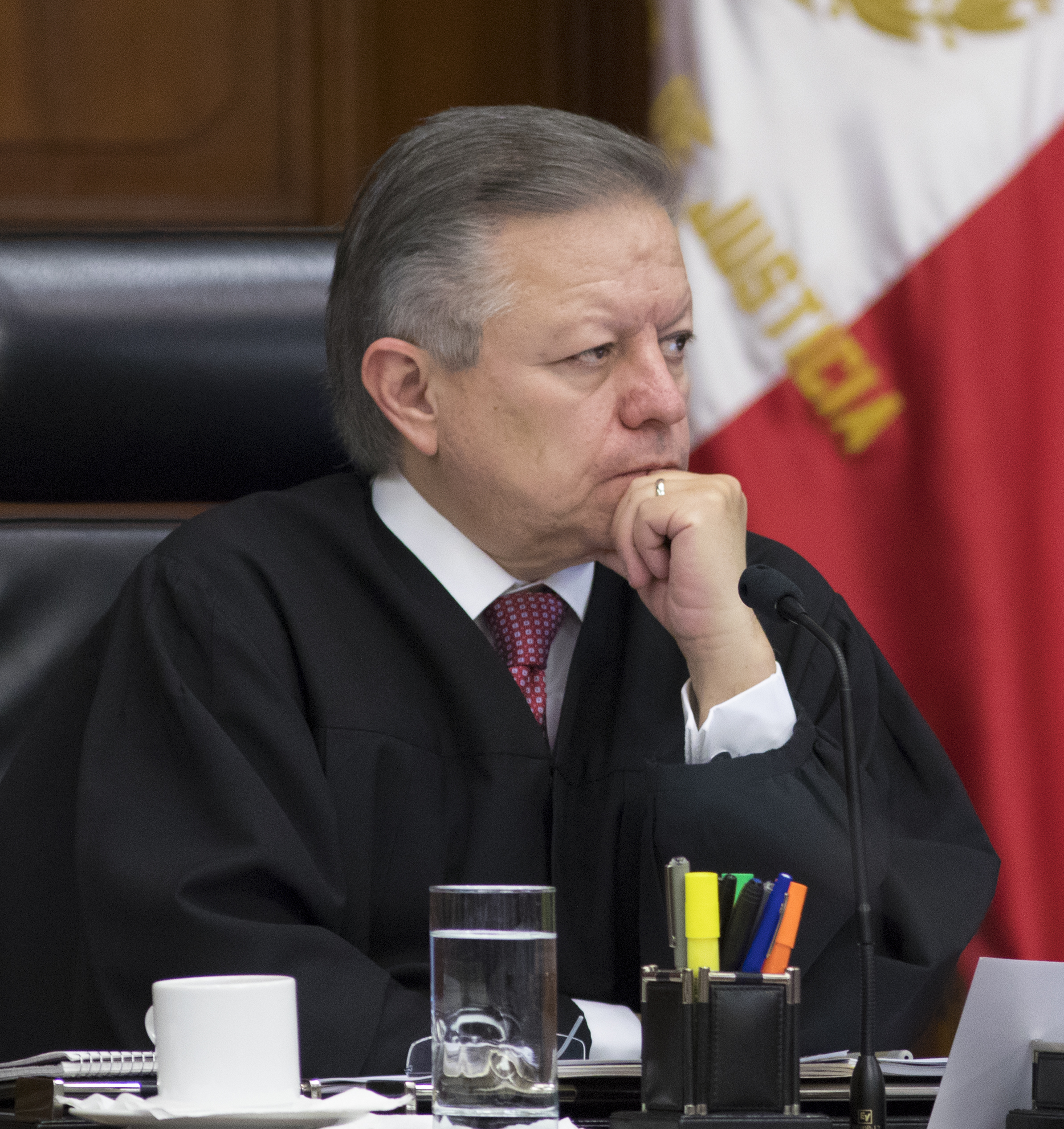

President of the Supreme Court of Justice of the Nation
- In office 2 January 2019 – 31 December 2022
- Preceded by: Luis María Aguilar Morales
- Succeeded by: Norma Lucía Piña Hernández

Associate Justice of the Supreme Court of Justice of the Nation
- In office 1 December 2009 – 15 November 2023
- Nominated by: Felipe Calderón
- Appointed by: Senate of the Republic
- Preceded by: Genaro David Góngora
- Succeeded by: Lenia Batres

Personal details
- Born: Arturo Fernando Zaldívar Lelo de Larrea; 9 August 1959 (age 67) Querétaro City, Querétaro, Mexico
- Party: National Regeneration Movement
- Education: Free School of Law (LLB); National Autonomous University of Mexico (SJD)

Arturo Fernando Zaldívar Lelo de Larrea (born 9 August 1959) is a Mexican lawyer who served as a member of the Supreme Court of Justice of the Nation from 2009 to 2023. Zaldívar served as president of the Court (Chief Justice) from 2 January 2019 to 31 December 2022.

== Biography ==
He obtained his law degree at the Escuela Libre de Derecho (ELD) and completed a Law PhD at the National Autonomous University of Mexico. He has tenure of second-year Constitutional Law at ELD and is a Graduate School Professor at the same school of Constitutional Law and Constitutional Procedure. He is also a Professor of the Law Faculty at UNAM, the LL.M. program at the Universidad Panamericana (UP), and the LL.B. (Bachelor of Laws) at Universidad Iberoamericana. He was a member of the commission created by the Supreme Court, in charge of reforming the Ley de Amparo (the law concerning the partial judicial review and the protection of the civil rights embedded in the Constitution).

He was a consultant for the Law division of the Instituto Tecnológico Autónomo de México (ITAM) regarding the design of the Graduate Program in Administrative Law and a member of the academic committees of the Instituto de la Judicatura Federal (Institute of Federal Judicature) and the Tribunal Electoral del Poder Judicial de la Federación (Federal Electoral Tribunal).

He held a private practice for 25 years.

He was founder and Vice President of the Instituto Mexicano de Derecho Procesal Constitucional (Mexican Institute of Constitutional Procedure), member of the Mexican division of the directive committee of the Instituto Iberoamericano de Derecho Procesal Constitucional (Iberoamerican Institute of Procedural Constitutional Law), member of the graduate school counsel of Constitutional Law and Human Rights program at UP, member of the Barra Mexicana-Colegio de Abogados (Mexican Bar and Advocate's College). He is also a member of several Law Review committees and a consultant for various Law Schools and Law Institutes in the country and the region.

He is the author of Hacia una nueva Ley de Amparo (Towards a New Amparo Law) and has published more than seventy essays in specialized journals and international publications.

=== Supreme Court of Justice of the Nation ===
In 2009, President Felipe Calderón nominated him as a Minister (associate justice) of the Supreme Court to fill the vacancy left after the retirement of Genaro David Góngora Pimentel. Zaldívar was confirmed by the Senate with 90 votes on 1 December 2009.
