= Norma Lucía Piña Hernández =

Mexican lawyer and judge

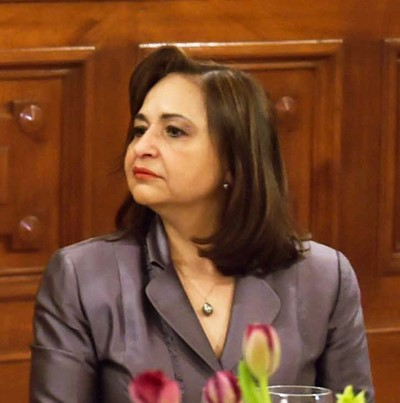
- Piña in 2016

President of the Supreme Court of Justice of the Nation
- In office 2 January 2023 – 31 August 2025
- Preceded by: Arturo Zaldívar Lelo de Larrea
- Succeeded by: Hugo Aguilar Ortiz

Associate Justice of the Supreme Court of Justice of the Nation
- In office 10 December 2015 – 31 August 2025
- Nominated by: Enrique Peña Nieto
- Preceded by: Olga Sánchez Cordero
- Succeeded by: Seat abolished

Personal details
- Born: Norma Lucía Piña Hernández; 29 July 1960 (age 66) Mexico City, Mexico
- Education: Benemérita Escuela Nacional de Maestros (BEd); National Autonomous University of Mexico (LLB, SJD)

Norma Lucía Piña Hernández (born 29 July 1960) is a Mexican lawyer and educator who was the first women to serve as president of the Supreme Court of Justice of the Nation from 2023. She was a member of the Supreme Court from December 2015 to August 2025. She was recognised for her judicial independence after she refused to participate in the 2025 Mexican judicial elections.

== Education ==
Piña became a professor of primary-education pedagogy in 1978 at the Benemérita Escuela Nacional de Maestros, at Mexico City. She became a lawyer at the National Autonomous University of Mexico in 1984. She became a specialist in social psychology and communication at the National Institute of Communication Science, in Madrid in 1978, tuition paid by the Secretary of Public Education. Piña became a specialist in constitutional and administrative law at the postgraduate level at the National Autonomous University of Mexico in 1986.

She earned her doctorate in law at the National Autonomous University of Mexico in 1986, becoming a judicial specialist at the Institute of Judicial Specialization of the Supreme Court of Justice in 1989. Piña is a criminal law specialist, with a certificate from the Panamerican University in Mexico City in 1997. She took courses on human rights at the Institute of the Federal Judiciary, and also she specializes in judicial argumentation, earning a certificate at the post-graduate division at the University of Alicante in Spain, on 2010.

== Career ==
Prior being a Supreme Court justice, Piña worked at the Manuel M. Acosta Pedogeological Experimentation Elementary School at the Meritorious National School of Teachers. She worked at the Institute of Judicial Investigations at the National Autonomous University, and as a legal opinion drafter for the Third Collegiate Administrative Court for the First Circuit from 1988 to 1992. She worked as a clerk for the Supreme Court of Justice from 1992 to 1998, and she was a judge for the third district of the State of Morelos from 1998 to 2000. Piña worked as a judge of Federal District for the Administrative Courts in 2000. She was an opposition Circuit Magistrate at September 2000. She was also a Magistrate for the Administrative Court. She was a First Circuit Magistrate for the Twentieth Court for the Administrative Courts. Today, she is a Supreme Court justice, as a president of the Primera Sala (First Hall).

== Designation as a Supreme Court justice ==
After two failed attempts to reach the highest rank in Mexican Judiciary, Piña became the eleventh woman to reach the position. She came to the Supreme Court of Justice to replace Olga Sánchez Cordero. She appeared in front of the Mexican Senate showing a formalist profile regarding her interpretation of philosophy, saying that there are no absolute values in law.

Piña was appointed as a justice after her appearance on the Senate on 24 November 2015, after the two previous failed attempts, after being part of the judiciary for 27 years. On 28 September 2016, Piña was chosen by her colleagues as the president of the Primera Sala (First Hall) after the justices voted unanimously. She substituted the justice Alfredo Gutiérrez Ortiz Mena, who was in charge to review the criminal and civil jurisprudence cases. She is president from 1 October 2016, to 30 September 2018.

She served as president of the Supreme Court of Mexico from 2023 to 2025, being the first woman ever to hold that position. She was a member of the Supreme Court from December 2015 to August 2025, when her seat was abolished as a result of the 2024 Mexican judicial reform and she refused to participate in the 2025 Mexican judicial elections. In 2025 she and UN Special Rapporteur Margaret Satterthwaite both received the International Association of Judges's Judicial Independence Award.
