= Guillermo Iberio Ortiz Mayagoitia =

Mexican jurist and judge

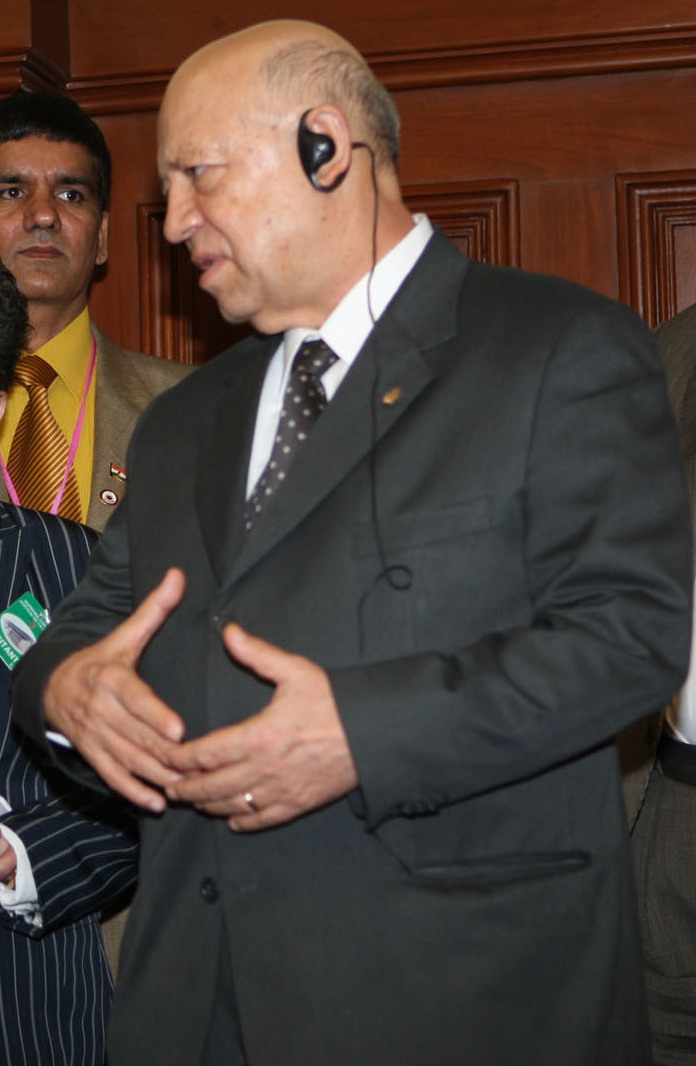
- Guillermo Iberio Ortiz Mayagoitia

President of the Supreme Court of Justice of the Nation
- In office 2 January 2007 – 31 December 2010
- Preceded by: Mariano Azuela Güitrón
- Succeeded by: Juan N. Silva Meza

Personal details
- Born: Guillermo Iberio Ortiz Mayagoitia; 10 February 1941 (age 85) Misantla, Veracruz
- Education: Universidad Veracruzana (LLB)
- Profession: lawyer

Guillermo Iberio Ortiz Mayagoitia (born 10 February 1941) is a Mexican jurist and former Supreme Court Justice. He previously served as the President (Chief Justice) of the Supreme Court of Justice of the Nation from 2 January 2007 to 31 December 2010.

Ortiz Mayagoitia, a native of Misantla, Veracruz, earned his law degree at the Universidad Veracruzana in Xalapa. He served the judiciary in various positions in Poza Rica and Tuxpan in his home state and as a clerk at the federal Supreme Court. He later held District Judge positions in the state of Oaxaca and the Federal District, and served as a Circuit Judge in Villahermosa, Tabasco, and Veracruz, Veracruz. In 1993 he was appointed to the appeals chamber of the Federal Electoral Tribunal.

On 27 January 1995 his Supreme Court appointment, proposed by President Ernesto Zedillo, was ratified by the Senate. He was elected Chief Justice, with seven votes out of eleven, by the Supreme Court on 2 January 2007.

Legal offices
Preceded by Mariano Azuela Güitrón	President of the Supreme Court of Justice of the Nation; 2 January 2007 – 31 December 2010	Succeeded by Juan N. Silva Meza
