= Hugo Aguilar Ortiz =

President of the Supreme Court of Justice of the Nation of Mexico since 2025

President of the Supreme Court of Justice of the Nation
- Incumbent
- Assumed office 1 September 2025
- Preceded by: Norma Lucía Piña Hernández

Associate Justice of the Supreme Court of Justice of the Nation
- Incumbent
- Assumed office 1 September 2025
- Preceded by: Seat established

Personal details
- Born: 1 April 1973 (age 53) San Miguel El Grande, Oaxaca, Mexico
- Education: Benito Juárez Autonomous University of Oaxaca (LLB)

Hugo Aguilar Ortiz (Note: In this Mexican name, the surname is Aguilar and the second or maternal family name is Ortiz.) (born 1 April 1973) is a Mexican lawyer of Mixtec heritage. A native of the state of Oaxaca, he is the President of the Supreme Court of Justice of the Nation after the 2025 Mexican judicial elections of 1 June 2025.

== Professional career ==
Hugo Aguilar Ortiz was born in Villa Guadalupe Victoria, in the Oaxacan municipality of San Miguel El Grande, in 1973. He holds a law degree from the Benito Juárez Autonomous University of Oaxaca (UABJO).

In 1996, he was a member of the advisory panel that assisted the Zapatista Army of National Liberation (EZLN) in drafting a series of constitutional amendments on indigenous rights. In 2007–2008, he served as a consultant with the Mexico office of the Office of the United Nations High Commissioner for Human Rights (OHCHR) on issues related to Indigenous peoples' lands, territories, and natural resources. He has worked as the coordinator for indigenous rights at the National Institute of Indigenous Peoples (INPI) since 2018.

Aguilar Ortiz was nominated by the federal executive to contend in the judicial elections held on 1 June 2025. He received the highest number of votes cast among the 64 candidates competing for seats on the Supreme Court of Justice of the Nation (SCJN) and became the Supreme Court's next president (chief justice), replacing Norma Piña Hernández.

Hugo Aguilar has faced the rejection of indigenous peoples who point him out for bureaucratizing and legitimizing adverse possession or squatting, imposing the Fourth Transformation regime's megaprojects and silencing victims of harassment.
