= Mariano Azuela Güitrón =

Mexican judge (1936–2025)

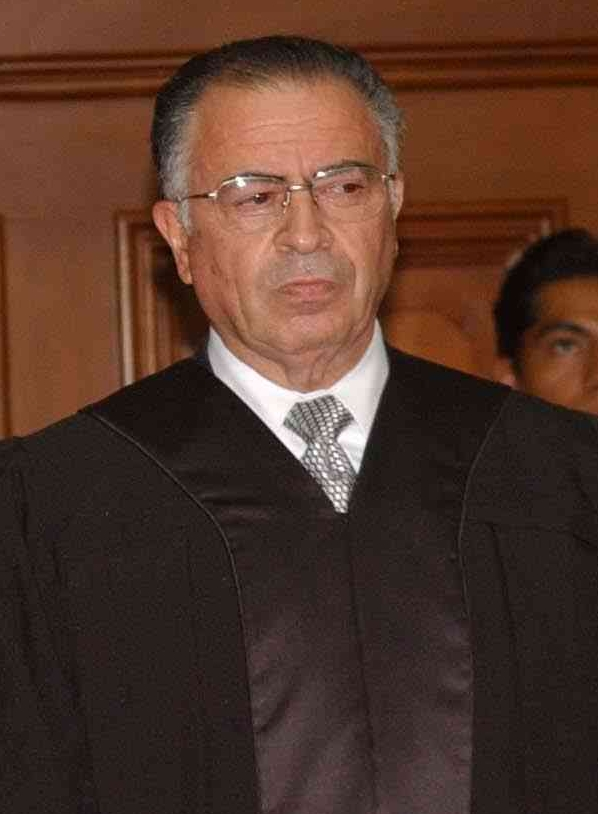
- Azuela Güitrón in 2004

President of the Supreme Court of Justice of the Nation
- In office 1 January 2003 – 2 January 2007
- Preceded by: Genaro David Góngora
- Succeeded by: Guillermo Iberio Ortiz Mayagoitia

Justice of the Supreme Court of Justice of the Nation
- In office 1 February 1995 – 30 November 2009
- Appointed by: Ernesto Zedillo
- Preceded by: new seat
- Succeeded by: Luis María Aguilar Morales
- In office 10 May 1983 – 31 December 1994
- Appointed by: Miguel de la Madrid
- Preceded by: Raúl Lozano Ramírez
- Succeeded by: seat abolished

Personal details
- Born: 1 April 1936 Mexico City, Mexico
- Died: 16 May 2025 (aged 89)
- Education: National Autonomous University of Mexico (LLB)

Mariano Azuela Güitrón (1 April 1936 – 16 May 2025) was a Mexican jurist who was a member of the Supreme Court of Justice of the Nation (SCJN) from 1983 to 2009 and served as its president (chief justice) from 2003 to 2007.

== Background ==
Born 1 April 1936, in Mexico City, to Mariano Azuela Rivera – who also served as a Minister of the Supreme Court (Associate Justice) – and María de los Dolores Güitrón Machaen; he was also the grandson of Mariano Azuela González, a prominent novelist of the Mexican Revolutionary period. He was married to Consuelo Bohigas Lomelín. Azuela graduated with a bachelor's degree in law from the National Autonomous University of Mexico (UNAM) in 1959.

Azuela Güitrón died on 16 May 2025, at the age of 89.

== Judicial career ==
Azuela Güitrón served as magistrate (1971–1983) and president (1981) of the Fiscal Tribunal of the Federation. He was a long-serving member of the faculty at the Ibero-American University in Mexico City, which he joined in 1963.

In 1983, he joined the Supreme Court of Justice of the Nation and from January 2003 to January 2006 served as its president (chief justice).

== Published books ==
- Derecho, Sociedad y Estado
- Suprema Corte de Justicia y el Derecho a la Vida (2002)
- El Tribunal Fiscal de la Federación, 45 años al servicio de México
- La Constitución Comentada

Legal offices
Preceded by Genaro David Góngora Pimentel	President of the Supreme Court of Justice of the Nation; 1 January 2003 – 2 January 2007	Succeeded by Guillermo Iberio Ortiz Mayagoitia
