= Escuela Libre de Derecho =

Law school in Mexico City

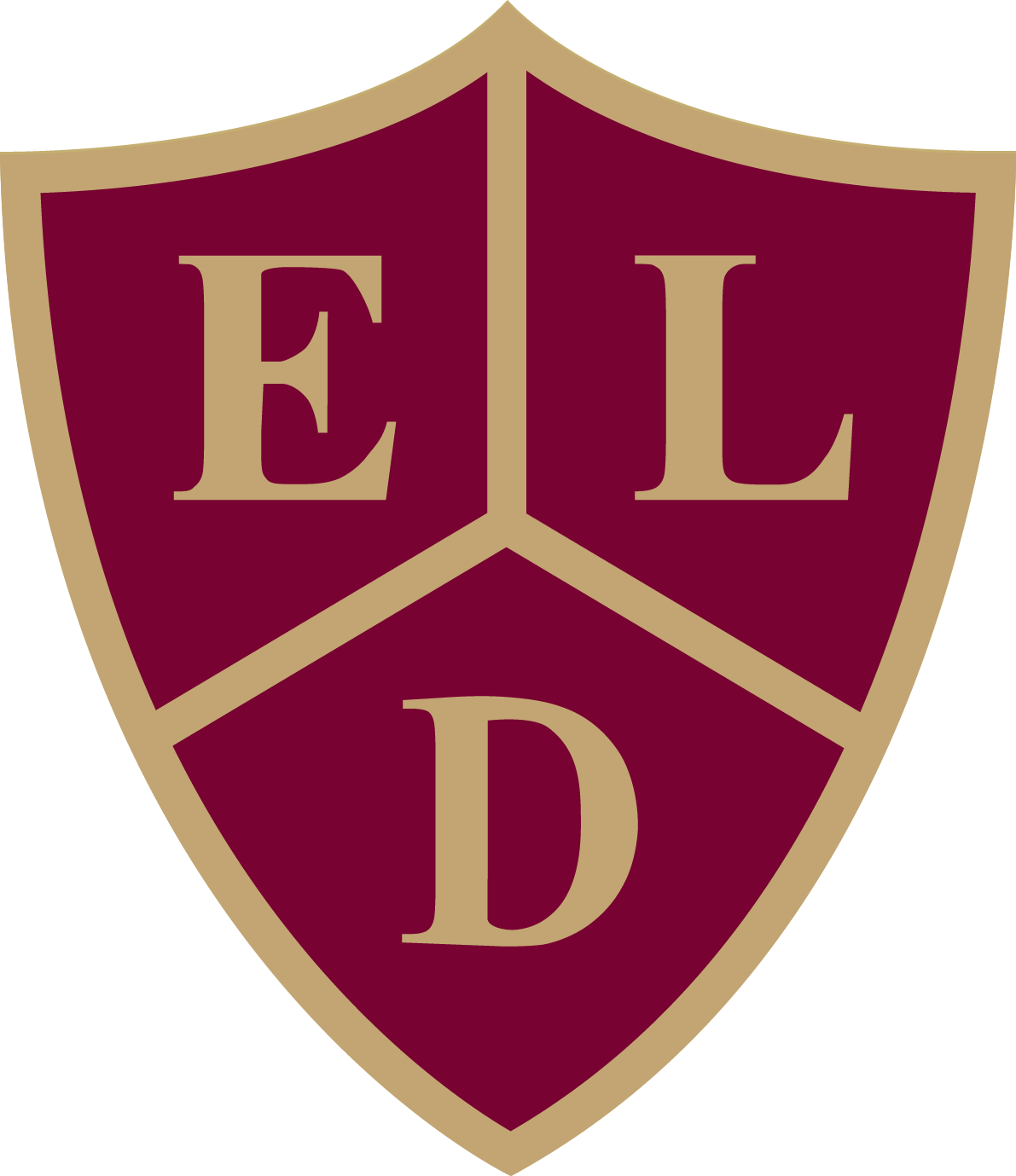
- Motto: "Jus neque inflecti gratia, Neque perfringi potentia, Neque adulterari pecunia debet" (Latin)
- Motto in English: "Law cannot be influenced by favor, seduced by power nor adulterated by pecuniary favor"
- Type: Private
- Established: July 24, 1912
- Affiliations: Illustrious and National Bar Association of Mexico
- Rector: Emilio González de Castilla del Valle
- Students: 640
- Location: Dr. José María Vértiz 12, Colonia Doctores, Cuauhtémoc, Mexico City, Mexico; 19.425556°N 99.146111°W 19°25′31.94″N 99°8′46.06″W
- Campus: Urban
- Colors: Wine and gold
- Website: https://www.eld.edu.mx/

Escuela Libre de Derecho (ELD) is a private law school in Mexico City, Mexico. Founded in 1912, it is one of the oldest law schools in Mexico and the oldest private institution focused in teaching law.

Since its establishment in 1912, the Escuela has had as its only mission the teaching of law, breeding from the principles of academic freedom, outside of any form of religiosity, or political ideology. It has graduated many notable alumni, including two Mexican presidents, ten justices of the Mexican Supreme Court as well as notable politicians, notary publics, litigators and transactional law practitioners.

The Escuela Libre de Derecho is known for its unique academic program, which consists of annual courses followed by a single oral examination. This structure has led to a notable attrition rate, with no more than 4,310 alumni in over 113 years.

== History ==
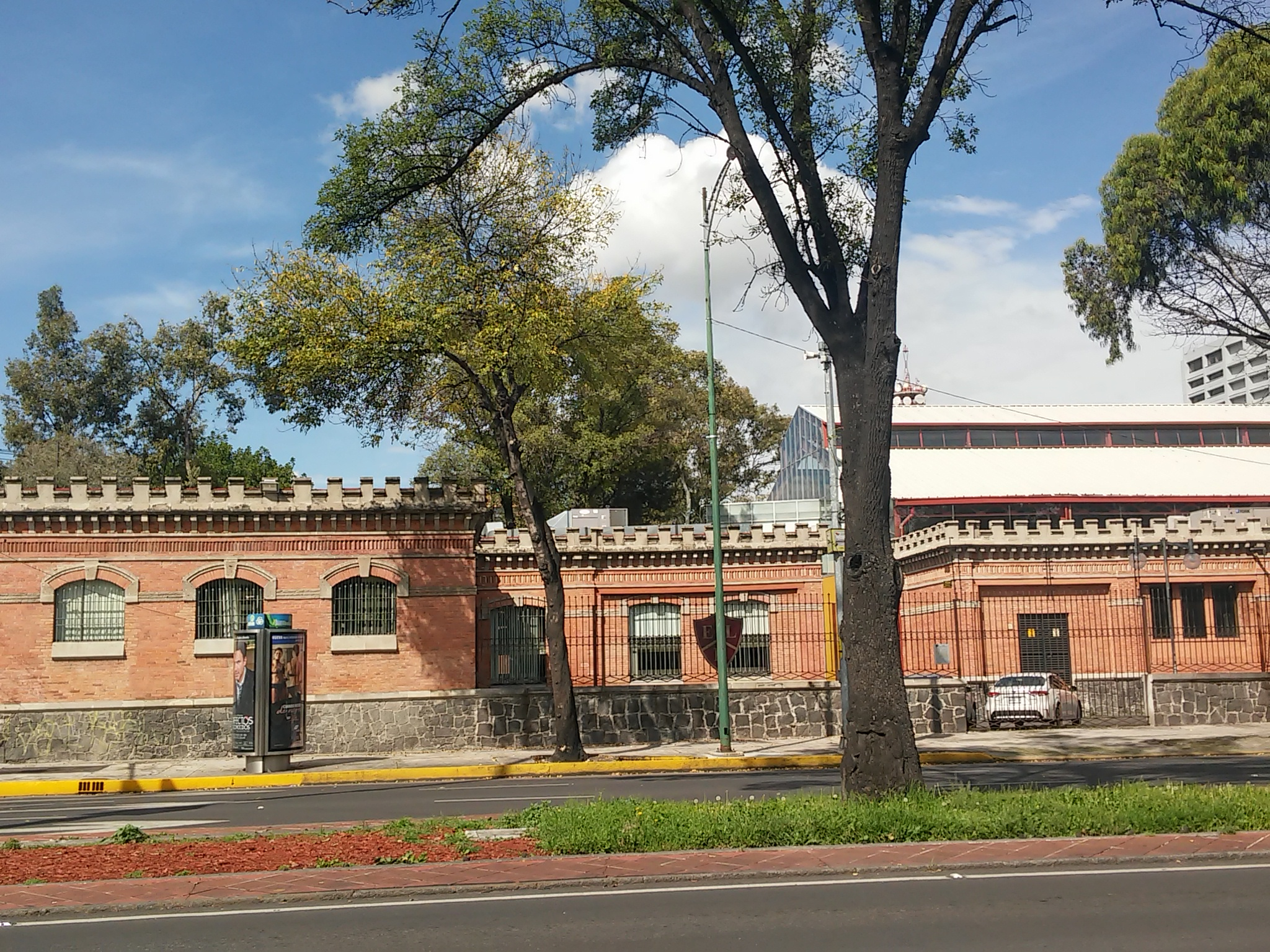
View of the school from Dr Rio de la Loza Street

Escuela Libre de Derecho was founded on July 24, 1912, by several alumni of the Escuela Nacional de Jurisprudencia in protest of the imposition of Luis Cabrera as the dean, overlooking Don Jorge Vera Estañol.

Today, it is considered one of the most prestigious law schools in Mexico.

== Characteristics of the School ==
Some of the fundamental characteristics of the school is that it is sponsored by the board of the Illustrious and National Bar Association of Mexico (Ilustre y Nacional Colegio de Abogados de México, in Spanish), and, in accordance with the "Regulatory Decree of Free Schools" (Decreto Regulatorio de Escuelas Libres, in Spanish) of October 22, 1929, on its first article it defines free schools as the teaching institutions sustained by private efforts and resources, that have for purpose to provide artistic, middle school, high school, or professional education; and on article 7 establishes that the concession granted by the then acting president, Emilio Portés Gil constituted the legal title of the authorized free school, giving the school a definitive right which cannot be canceled, having plain right to issue its diplomas according to its study plans, without the need of the recognition of the official validity of studies granted by the Public Education Secretary. Being the Escuela Libre de Derecho the only one in its type subject to said privilege regime.

Another characteristic of this school is that its teachers do not receive a salary or monetary compensation whatsoever, which is why students only make a symbolic payment used to cover the school expenses.

=== Motto and Principles of Escuela Libre de Derecho ===
The motto for Escuela Libre de Derecho is "Ius neque inflecti gratia, Neque perfringi potentia, Neque adulterari pecunia debet", which traduced from Latin means "law cannot be influenced by favor, seduced by power nor adulterated by pecuniary favor".

The building of the Escuela Libre de Derecho has an access from Doctor José María Vértiz street and another one from Arcos de Belén Avenue; said access has a hall with red walls that has transcribed in golden letters the article 6 of the schools regulation that states: "the order and discipline of the School are entrusted to the honor of its students and its teachers", emphasizing that the responsibility of the order inside and outside of the Institution rests in its student body and teachers, who always have in consideration that in Escuela Libre de Derecho everyone act in good faith.

== Evaluation and Certification ==
Escuela Libre de Derecho is the only professional teaching institution in the country where courses last a full year and it counts with an evaluation system consisting in a unique final exam for every course, consisting in verbal replies presented upon a jury integrated by, at least, three synodal examiners who shall be able to practice law by having a lawyer degree. This system is based in having a maximum number of courses a student can fail each year, as long it does not exceeds five courses, failing a sixth course would be cause for definitive discharge from the Institution; the ordinary time to conclude studies in this Institution and according with its study plan is of five years, but it cannot be extended by more than two years, since it would cause definitive discharge of the student.

The grades assigned by the examining jury in each course are unappealable. Once all the courses required by the Institution are approved, the student shall present a grade exam in which a thesis is presented and a practical case solved, in case the examining jury considers the student is apt to approve this exam, the School, under the patronage of the Illustrious and National Bar Association of México will issue the corresponding diploma for the law studies in order to practice law, different from the rest of teaching institutions in Mexico that issue their degrees for bachelor of law; obtaining the alumni form Escuela Libre de Derecho by the Public Education Secretary a lawyer certification.

== Felipe Tena Ramírez Library ==
Escuela Libre de Derecho has the second most important specialized law library in the country. It was originally founded with the school and has a reserved fund and various collections with over 60,000 volumes. The library was located on the second floor of the institution, until its own building was adapted in the old nearby factory, with which its collection could be increased. The newspaper library and the general collections are cataloged and classified. The theses and state legislation collections are being automated. In 2016 it was given the name Felipe Tena Ramírez.

== Notable people ==
=== Alumni ===
Since its founding in 1912, Escuela Libre de Derecho has produced around 4,000 alumni who have practiced law in the private, as well as in the public sector, in every level of government, in the three branches of government, and constitutionally autonomous organisms.

Mexican Presidents who have attended Escuela Libre de Derecho include:

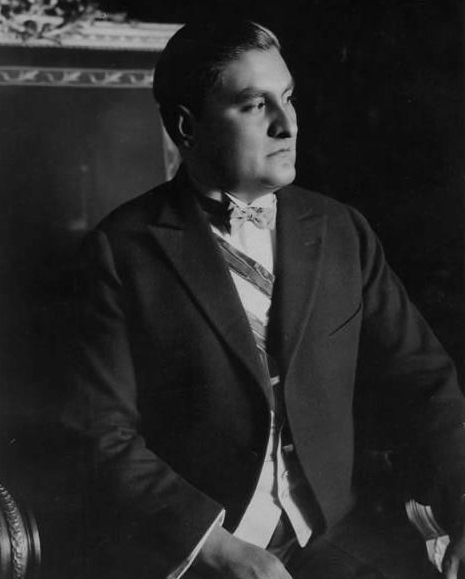
Emilio Portes Gil, 41st President of Mexico

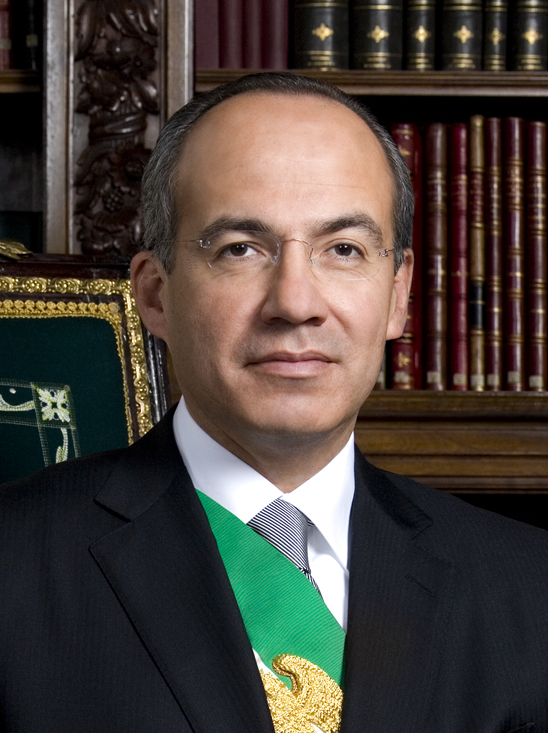
Felipe Calderón, 56th President of Mexico

Escuela Libre de Derecho alumni have occupied several positions in the Mexican Executive Cabinet including, Secretary of the Interior 2005–2006 (Carlos María Abascal Carranza) and 2008–2011 (Fernando Gómez-Mont); Secretary of Labor 2006–2011 (Javier Lozano Alarcón).

Other alumni include the filmmaker Carlos Reygadas and the former First Lady of Mexico (2006–2012) Margarita Zavala.

=== Faculty ===
Escuela Libre de Derecho's faculty has included various prominent legal scholars and politicians, including Miguel Mancera, Manuel Borja Soriano, Felipe Tena Ramírez, Ramón Sánchez Medal, Carlos Sodi Serret, José Luis de la Peza, Manuel Herrera y Lasso, Carlos Müggenburg y Rodríguez-Vigil, Diego Martín del Campo y Souza, Fauzi Hamdan Amad, Mauricio Oropeza Segura, Loretta Ortíz Ahlf, Luis Ruiz Rueda, and Luis Ruiz Quiroz.

Notable Escuela Libre de Derecho faculty include:

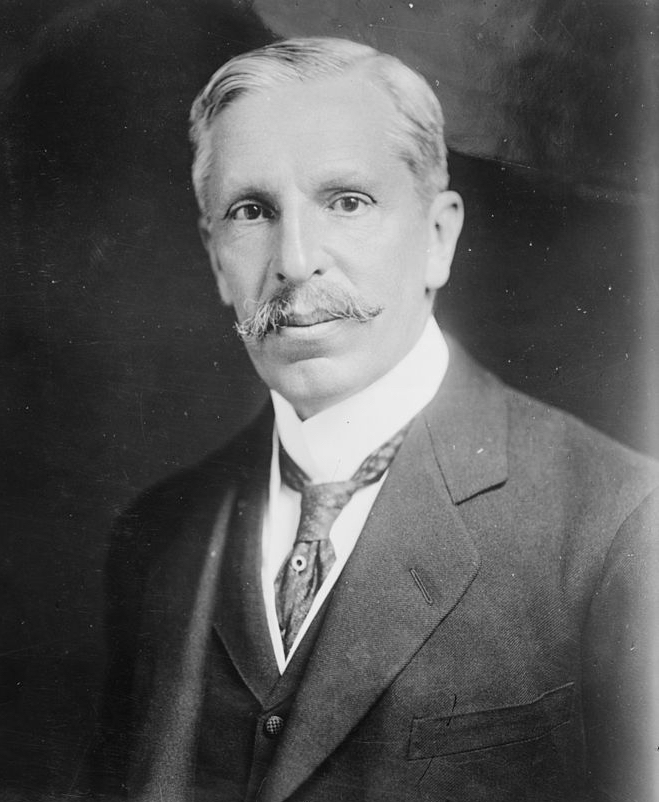
Pedro Lascuráin, politician, 38th President of Mexico

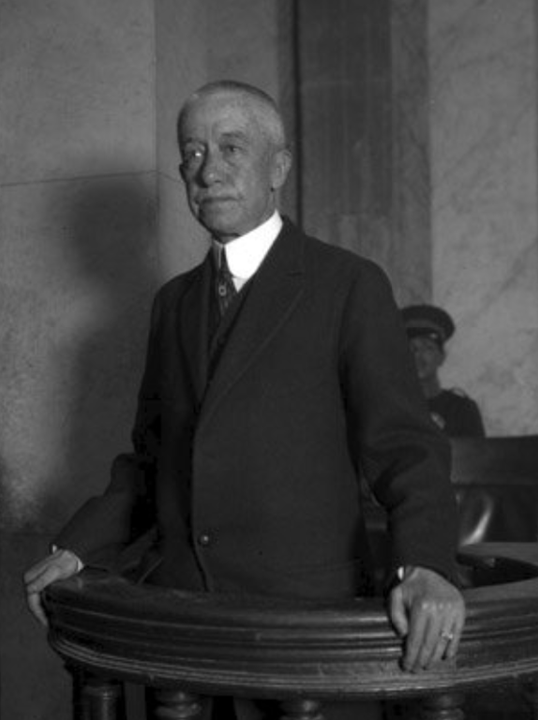
Demetrio Sodi Guergué, jurist, President of the Supreme Court of Justice of the Nation (1908–1910) and Secretary of Justice (March–May 1911)

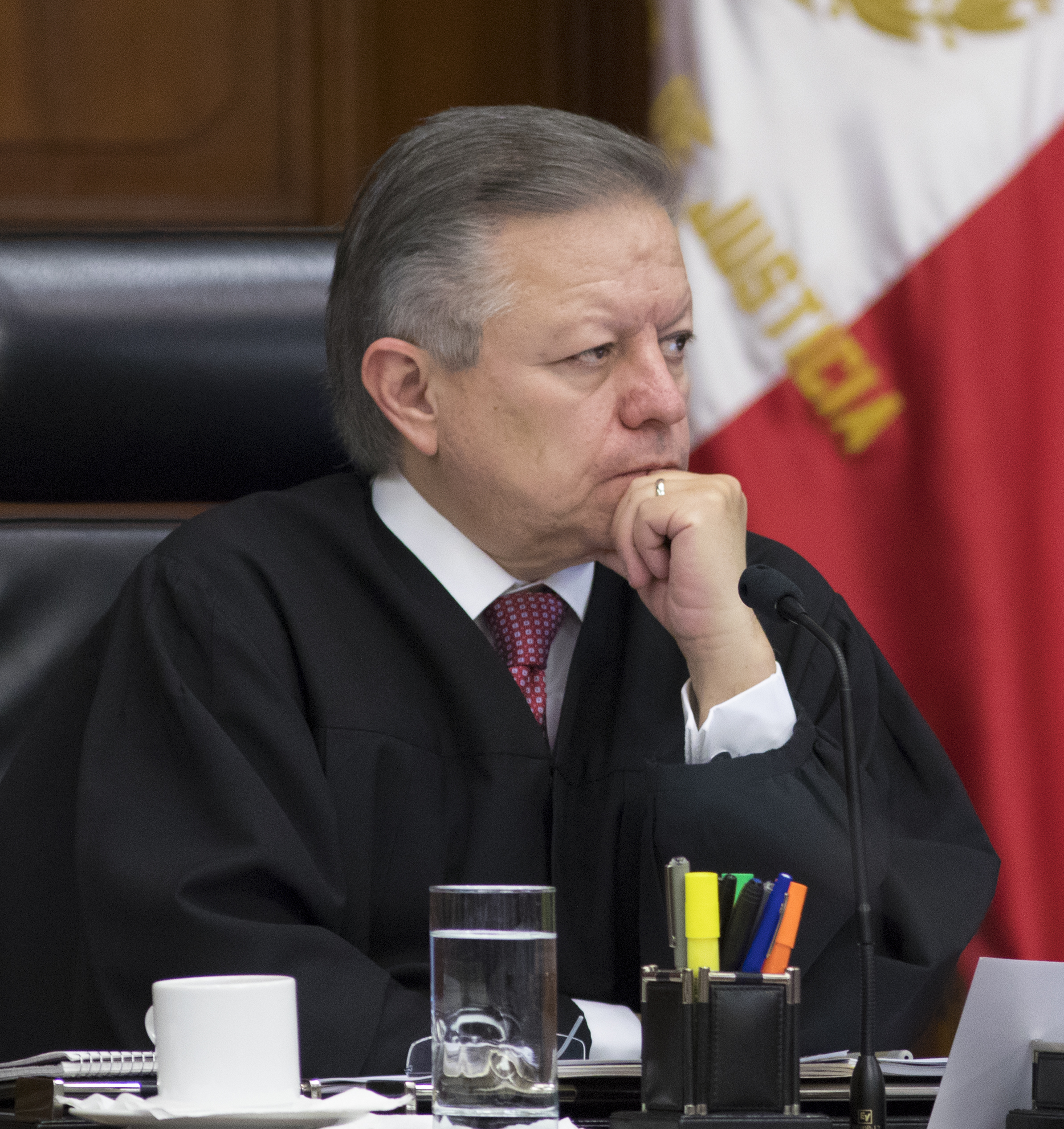
Arturo Zaldívar Lelo de Larrea, jurist, President of the Supreme Court of Justice of the Nation (2019–2023)

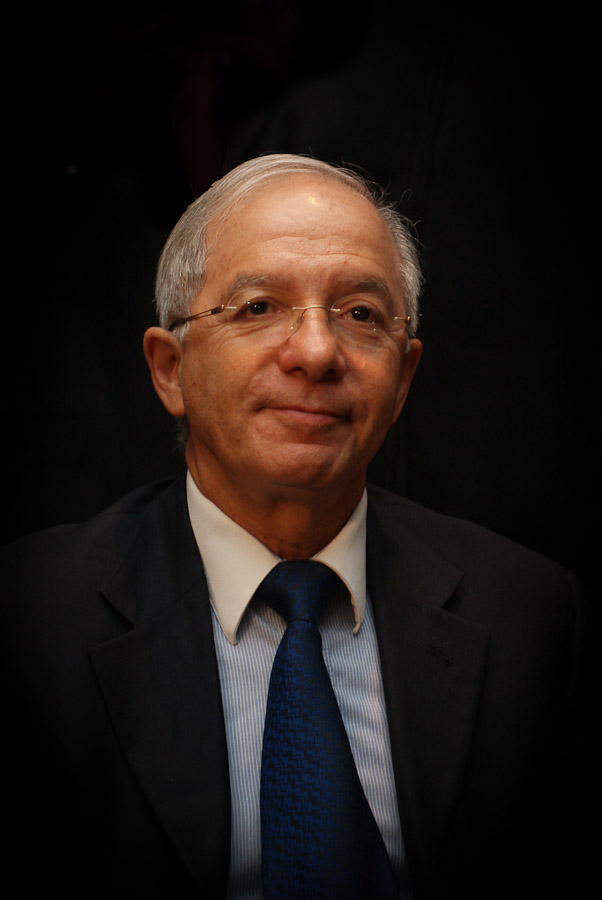
Luis Pazos, economist, CEO of Banobras

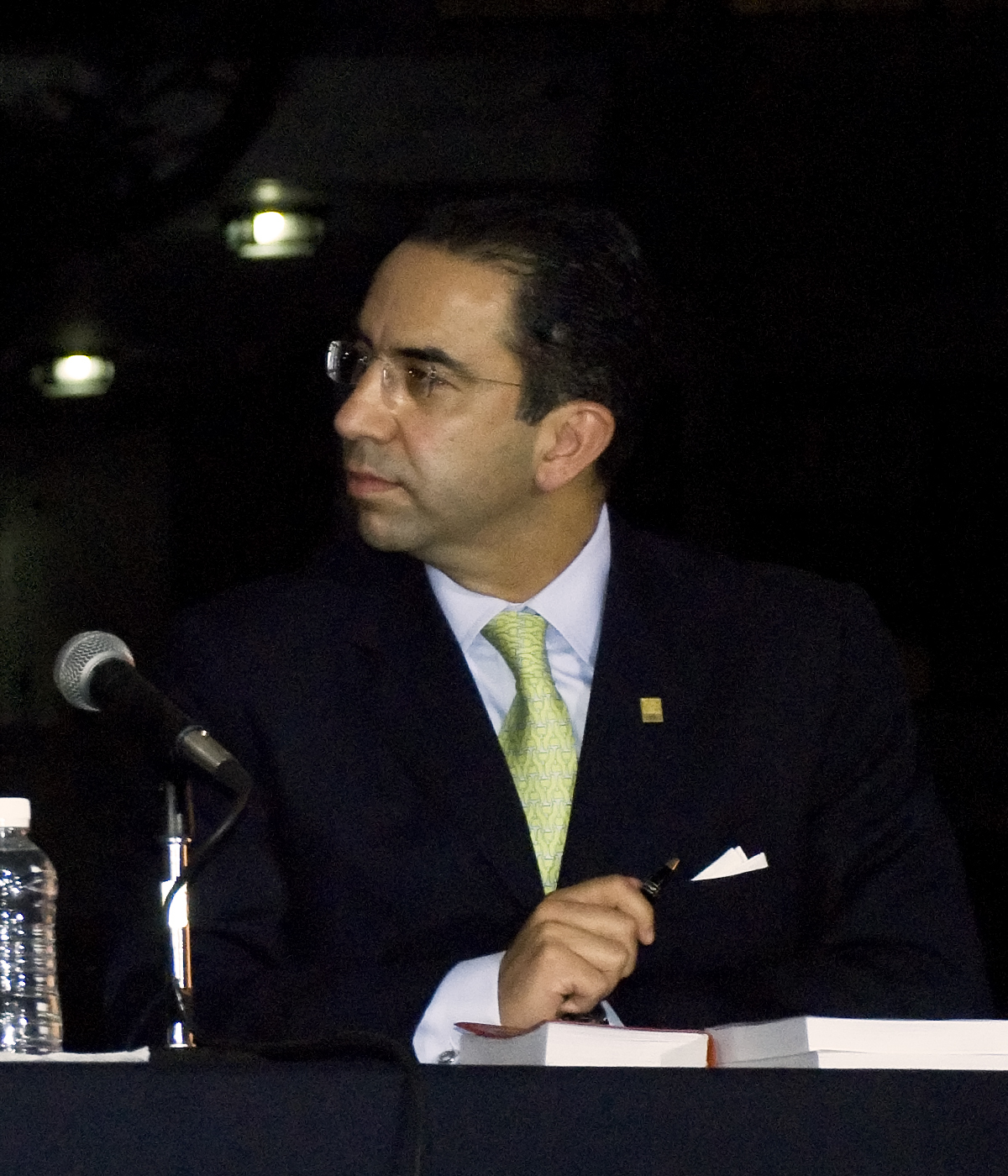
Javier Lozano Alarcón, Secretary of Labor (2006–2011) and Senator from Puebla (2012–2018)
