= Supreme Court of Mexico =

Highest court in Mexico

Supreme Court of Justice of the Nation
- Suprema Corte de Justicia de la Nación

- Judiciary flag
- Interactive map of Supreme Court of Justice of the Nation
- 19°25′52.01″N 99°7′55.58″W
- Established: 1825
- Jurisdiction: Mexico
- Location: Pino Suárez no. 2, Colonia Centro, Alcaldia Cuauhtémoc, C.P. 06065, Mexico City
- Coordinates: 19°25′52.01″N 99°7′55.58″W
- Composition method: Popular vote
- Authorised by: Constitution of Mexico
- Judge term length: 12 years
- Number of positions: 9
- Website: https://www.scjn.gob.mx/

President
- Currently: Hugo Aguilar Ortiz
- Since: 1 September 2025

The Supreme Court of Mexico, formally the Supreme Court of Justice of the Nation (Spanish: Suprema Corte de Justicia de la Nación; SCJN) is the highest court in Mexico and the apex of the Mexican federal judiciary.

Judges of the SCJN are elected for 12 years. Each branch of the federal government establishes an evaluation committee which chooses the candidates that will run for a seat in the Supreme Court. The justice (minister) with the most votes is also elected chief justice (president) of the SCJN for a two year period, and after the end of his period the president's office is assigned according to the number of votes that the justices (ministers) obtained in the last judicial election.

== History ==
=== Predecessors and origins ===
==== Colonial judicial system ====
The direct institutional predecessor to Mexico's modern supreme court was the Real Audiencia of Mexico (lit. 'Royal Audiencia of Mexico'). Created by royal decree on 13 December 1527, and seated in Mexico City, the Audiencia functioned as the highest appellate tribunal in New Spain with comprehensive civil and criminal jurisdiction.

The Audiencia's role, however, extended far beyond the purely judicial. In the Spanish colonial system, which operated without strict separation of powers, the Audiencia served as a critical advisory body to the viceroy and exercised significant governmental and administrative authority. When the office of viceroy became vacant, the Audiencia assumed interim executive control of the colonial government. The tribunal comprised royally appointed judges known as oidores (lit. 'hearers'), who acted as delegates of the monarch in administering justice.

==== Revolutionary constitutional development ====
The ideological foundation for an independent Mexican judiciary was laid during the Mexican War of Independence. José María Morelos y Pavón presented his document Sentimientos de la Nación (lit. 'Sentiments of the Nation') on 14 September 1813, at the opening of the Congress of Chilpancingo. In Article 6 of this document, Morelos articulated a clear vision for dividing sovereignty into three branches, which was given legal form in the Constitution of Apatzingán. Promulgated on 22 October 1814 by the Congress of Chilpancingo, the constitution mandated the creation of the Supremo Tribunal de Justicia (lit. 'Supreme Tribunal of Justice'), composed of five individuals.

The tribunal was formally installed on 7 March 1815, in Ario, Michoacán, with José María Sánchez de Arriola serving as its first president. Despite the difficult circumstances of war, the tribunal attempted to function as an independent judicial body. When royalist forces under Agustín de Iturbide captured Ario on 5 May 1815, the tribunal was forced to relocate repeatedly. The tribunal's existence was brief, as it, along with the other branches of the insurgent government, were dissolved on 15 December 1815.

=== Establishment ===
Following the consummation of Mexico's independence in 1821, the Plan of Iguala of 24 February provided the basis for transitional arrangements for governance and law, including the continuation of existing Spanish-era legal institutions such as the royal Audiencias. Following the collapse of the First Mexican Empire and the convocation of a constituent congress, the Acta Constitutiva de la Federación formally adopted a federal republican model and for the first time used the term Corte Suprema de Justicia (lit. 'Supreme Court of Justice'). The judicial framework combined French and Spanish influences, reflecting the Napoleonic model of codified law and administrative hierarchy, while the federal structure was inspired by the Constitution of the United States.

The Constitution of 1824 established the modern Mexican federal state and its judiciary. Title V, Article 123 declared that the judicial power of the federation would reside in a Supreme Court of Justice, circuit tribunals, and district courts. The Constitution provided that the Supreme Court would consist of eleven ministers and a prosecutor. The method of appointment reflected federalist compromise: each state legislature was to nominate candidates on the same day, the certificates of which were submitted to the federal Congress; then the Chamber of Deputies would deliberate and select among the nominees.

==== Early years ====
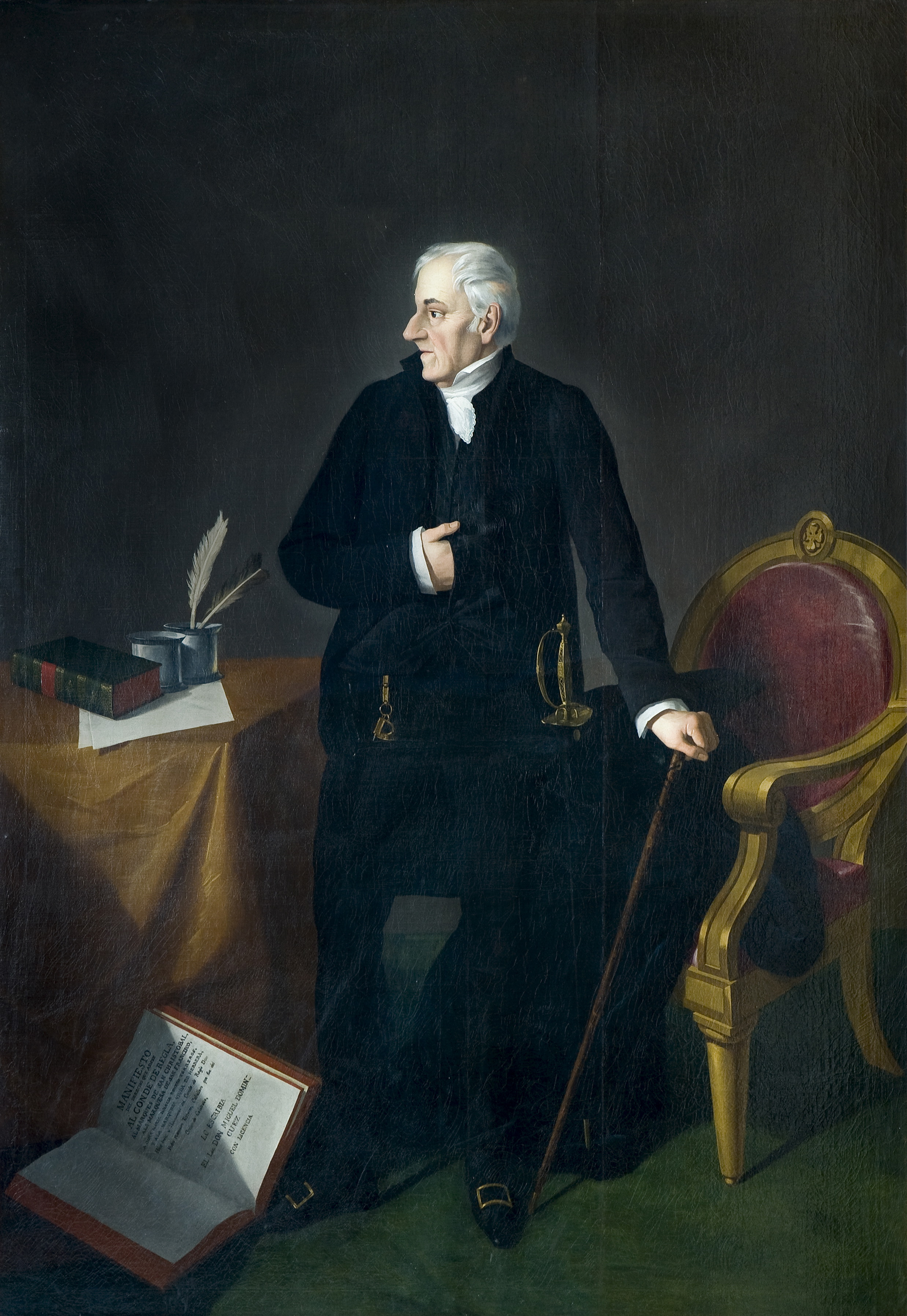
Miguel Domínguez, the first President of the Supreme Court from 1825 to 1827

The Supreme Court of Justice of the Nation was formally installed and began its functions on 15 March 1825, holding its inaugural session in the National Palace of Mexico City. The original bench included several distinguished jurists, among them Juan José Flores Alatorre, Manuel de la Peña y Peña, and Juan Gómez Navarrete, all of whom had previously served as oidores in the colonial Audiencias. Miguel Domínguez, a prominent lawyer and former insurgent leader, was elected as the first President of the Supreme Court.

From its inception, the Court faced substantial institutional and practical difficulties. It operated with limited staff, inadequate facilities, and a severely constrained budget. Moreover, Congress had not yet enacted the necessary implementing legislation to define the Court's organization and jurisdiction. In the absence of an Organic Law or Internal Regulations, the justices initially confined their work largely to administrative correspondence and relied on colonial-era Spanish law and the 1812 Constitution of Cádiz as provisional legal frameworks. Not until 1826 did Congress approve the Bases for the Regulation of the Supreme Court, together with the Law of Circuit Tribunals and District Judges, which formally established the structure of the federal judiciary.

Under the 1824 Constitution, the Supreme Court was granted jurisdiction over a range of cases: disputes involving federal entities; cases concerning contracts or business in which the federal government was a party; conflicts of jurisdiction between courts; and political trials for official misconduct by senior public officials, including the President, Vice President, cabinet ministers, and state governors. Within the Federal District and federal territories, the Court also exercised ordinary appellate jurisdiction in civil and criminal matters, functioning as both a court of second and third instance.

== Historical development ==
The Supreme Court's appointment method and size have been reformed multiple times. The selection process evolved from indirect legislative elections to presidential nomination with Senate approval, and finally to direct popular election beginning in 2024. Court size varied from 9 to 26 justices across different constitutional periods.

=== Appointment methods ===
Period	Constitution/Reform	Selection method	Description
1824–1857	Constitution of 1824	Indirect legislative election	State legislatures proposed candidates; the Chamber of Deputies made the final selection.
1857–1917	Constitution of 1857	Indirect popular election	Citizens voted for electors who then voted for justices.
1917–1928	Constitution of 1917	Indirect legislative election	State legislatures nominated one candidate each; Congress elected justices by secret ballot and majority vote.
1928–1994	1928 reform	Presidential nomination with Senate approval	The President nominated candidates; the Senate approved by simple majority.
1994–2024	1994 reform	Presidential nomination with Senate supermajority	The President submitted three candidates; the Senate approved one by two-thirds vote.
2024–present	2024 reform	Direct popular election	Justices are elected directly by citizens in a national vote.

=== Court composition ===
Period	Constitution/Reform	Number of justices
1824–1857	Constitution of 1824	11
1857–1917	Constitution of 1857	11
1917–1928	Constitution of 1917	11
1928–1934	1928 reform	16
1934–1951	1934 reform	21
1951–1994	1951 reform	26
1994–2024	1994 reform	11
2024–present	2024 reform	9

== Qualifications ==
- Be no less than 35 years of age nor over 65 years of age at the time of one's appointment
- Have held a law degree for at least 10 years.
- To have a good reputation and not have been convicted of theft, fraud, forgery, breach of trust, or any other offense which could imply a punishment of more than one year in prison.
- Not have been Director for Domestic Affairs, Chief of an Administrative Department, Attorney General of the Republic or as Mexico City Attorney General, Senator, Member of Parliament, Governor of any State, or Chief Executive of Mexico City during the year prior to his or her appointment.

The Constitution requires that the appointment of ministers of the court should fall to those persons who have served ably, effectively and honorably in the administration of justice, or to those who have distinguished themselves by their honor, competence and professional background in the exercise of their duties.

Ministers may take leave of their posts for three reasons:

- The end of their terms
- Relinquishment, which is only allowed in serious cases, all of which must be affirmed by the President and accepted or discarded by the Senate.
- Voluntary retirement: Proceeds when the interested party requests their retirement, as long as they meet the conditions of age and seniority.

== Membership ==
=== Sitting justices ===
The Supreme Court of Justice of the Nation is composed of nine justices. From among its members, one is designated as president for a two-year term. The presidency is determined by the order of votes received in the judicial election, beginning with the justice obtaining the highest number of votes and rotating in descending order. The current president is Hugo Aguilar Ortiz.

Justice	Age at		Start date / length of service	Election
Justice	Start	Present	Start date / length of service	Election
(President); Hugo Aguilar Ortiz; 1 April 1973 (age 53); San Agustín Tlacotepec, Oaxaca	52	53	1 September 2025; 1 year, 67 days	2025
Lenia Batres Guadarrama (Note: Batres Guadarrama, Esquivel Mossa, and Ortiz Ahlf had initially been appointed before the 2024 Mexican judicial reform and were subsequently re-elected to retain their seats.); 6 August 1969 (age 57); Mexico City	54	57	14 December 2023; 2 years, 10 months	2025
Yasmín Esquivel Mossa; 15 September 1963 (age 63); Mexico City	55	63	12 March 2019; 7 years, 7 months	2025
Loretta Ortiz Ahlf; 24 February 1955 (age 71); Mexico City	66	71	12 December 2021; 4 years, 10 months	2025
María Estela Ríos González; 4 April 1947 (age 79); Mexico City	78	79	1 September 2025; 1 year, 67 days	2025
Giovanni Azael Figueroa Mejía; 7 August 1978 (age 48); Tuxpan, Nayarit	47	48	1 September 2025; 1 year, 67 days	2025
Irving Espinosa Betanzo; 23 December 1975 (age 50); Mexico City	49	50	1 September 2025; 1 year, 67 days	2025
Arístides Rodrigo Guerrero García; 27 April 1984 (age 42); Mexico City	41	42	1 September 2025; 1 year, 67 days	2025
Sara Irene Herrerías Guerra; 25 February 1964 (age 62); Mexico City	61	62	1 September 2025; 1 year, 67 days	2025

== Presidents ==
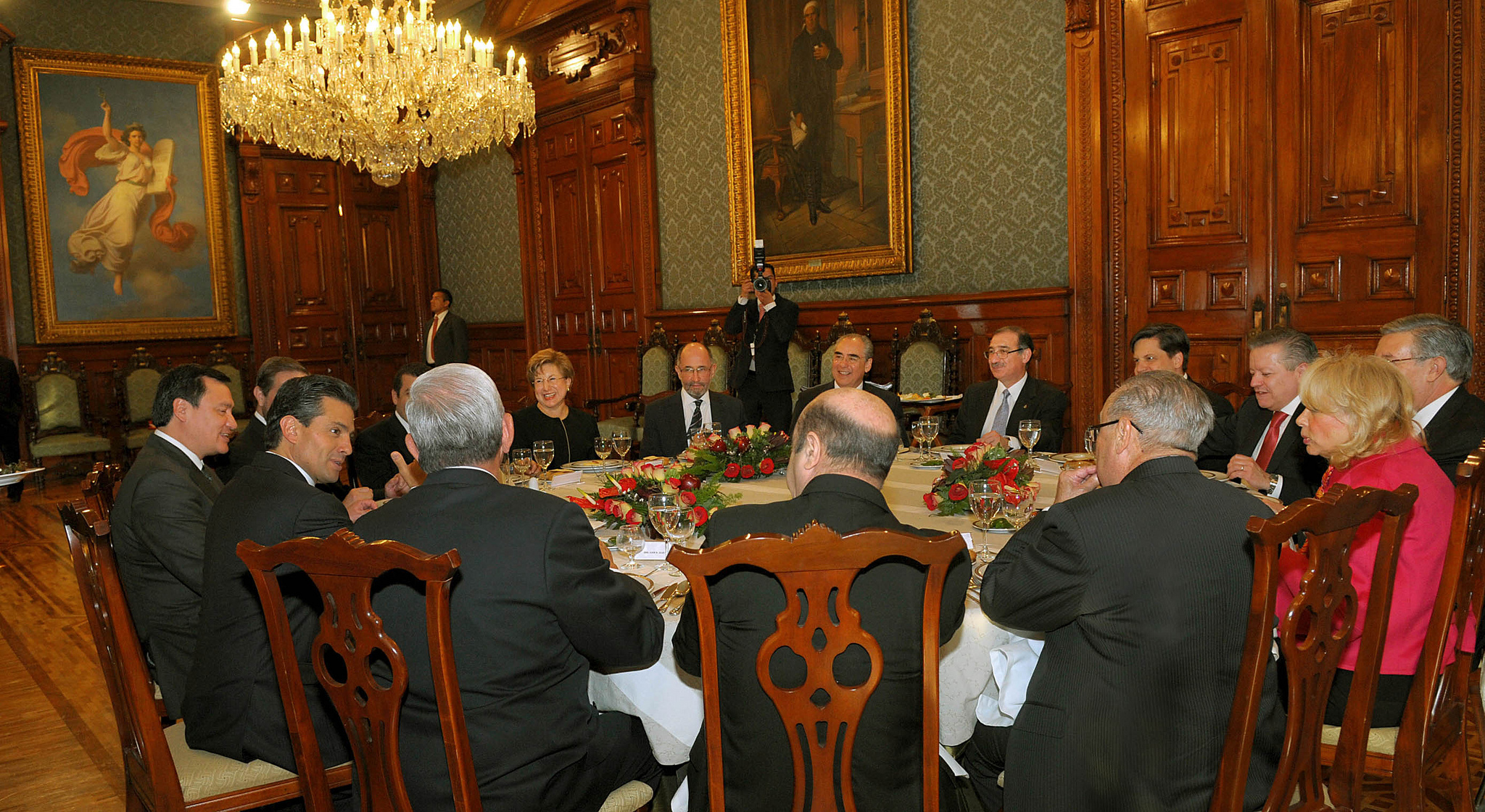
Meeting of the president Enrique Peña Nieto with the eleven Ministers of the Supreme Court of Justice of the Nation

The following persons were once Presidents of the Supreme Court under the 1917 Constitution:

- 1917–1919: Enrique M. del Río
- 1919–1920: Ernesto Garza Pérez
- 1920–1922: Enrique Moreno Pérez
- 1922–1923: Gustavo A. Vicencio
- 1923–1924: Francisco Modesto Ramírez
- 1924–1925: Gustavo A. Vicencio
- 1925–1927: Manuel Padilla
- 1927–1928: Francisco Díaz Lombardo
- 1928–1929: Jesús Guzmán Vaca
- 1929–1933: Julio García
- 1934: Francisco H. Ruiz
- 1934–1940: Daniel V. Valencia
- 1941–1951: Salvador Urbina
- 1952: Roque Estrada Reynoso
- 1953: Hilario Medina
- 1954: José María Ortiz Tirado
- 1955–1956: Vicente Santos Guajardo
- 1957: Hilario Medina
- 1958: Agapito Pozo Balbás
- 1959–1964: Alfonso Guzmán Neyra
- 1965–1968: Agapito Pozo Balbás
- 1969–1973: Alfonso Guzmán Neyra
- 1974–1975: Euquerio Guerrero López
- 1976: Mario G. Rebolledo Fernández
- 1977–1981: Agustín Téllez Cruces
- 1982: Mario G. Rebolledo Fernández
- 1982–1985: Jorge Iñárritu y Ramírez de Aguilar
- 1986–1990: Carlos del Río Rodríguez
- 1991–1994: Ulises Schmill Ordóñez
- 1995–1999: José Vicente Aguinaco Alemán
- 1999–2002: Genaro David Góngora Pimentel
- 2002–2006: Mariano Azuela Güitrón
- 2007–2010: Guillermo Iberio Ortiz Mayagoitia
- 2011–2014: Juan N. Silva Meza
- 2015–2018: Luis María Aguilar Morales
- 2019–2022: Arturo Zaldívar Lelo de Larrea
- 2023–2025: Norma Lucía Piña Hernández
- 2025–present: Hugo Aguilar Ortiz

== Supreme Court building ==
The court itself is located just off the main plaza of Mexico City on the corners of Pino Suarez and Carranza Streets. It was built between 1935 and 1941 by Mexican architect Antonio Muñoz Garcia. Prior to the Conquest, this site was reserved for the ritual known as Dance of the Flyers which is still practiced today in Papantla. Hernán Cortés claimed the property after the Conquest and its ownership was in dispute during much of the colonial period with Cortes's heirs, the city government, and the Royal and Pontifical University all claiming rights. It was also the site of a very large market known as El Volador.

Within the building, there are four flanks painted in 1941 by José Clemente Orozco, two of which are named The Social Labor Movement and Commonwealth. There is also a mural done by American artist George Biddle entitled "War and Peace" at the entrance to the law library. The building also contains a mural by Rafael Cauduro, which "graphically illustrates the Gran Guignol of Mexican torture", and includes a depiction of the 1968 Tlatelolco massacre as well as "a cut-away of a prison, perhaps the infamous Lecumberri Black Palace where student leaders who escaped death were jailed."

While this building is still the chief seat for the Supreme Court, an alternative site at Avenida Revolución in the Guadalupe Inn district was opened in 2002.

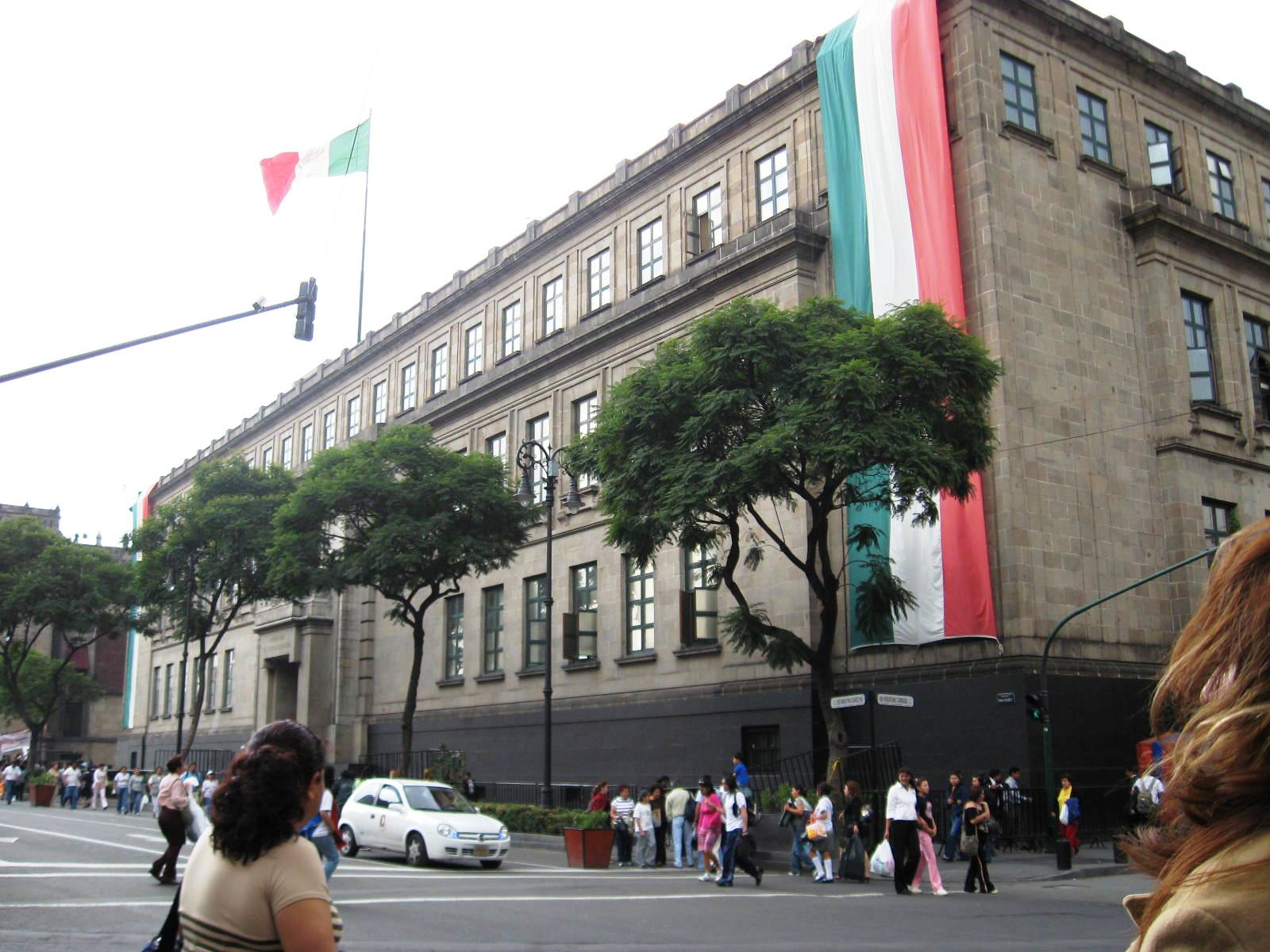
Building of the Supreme Court of Justice of Mexico

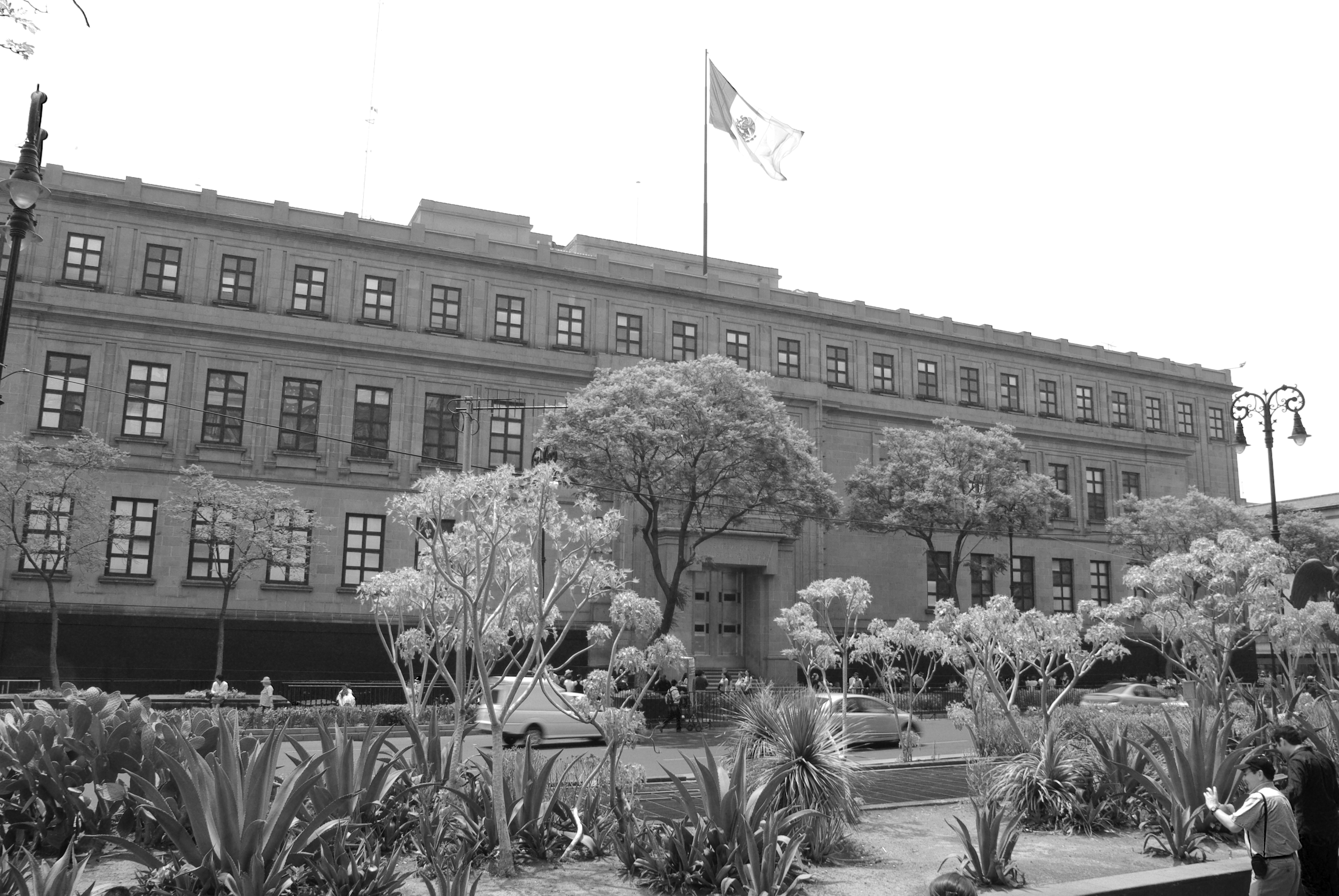
Supreme Court of Justice Building

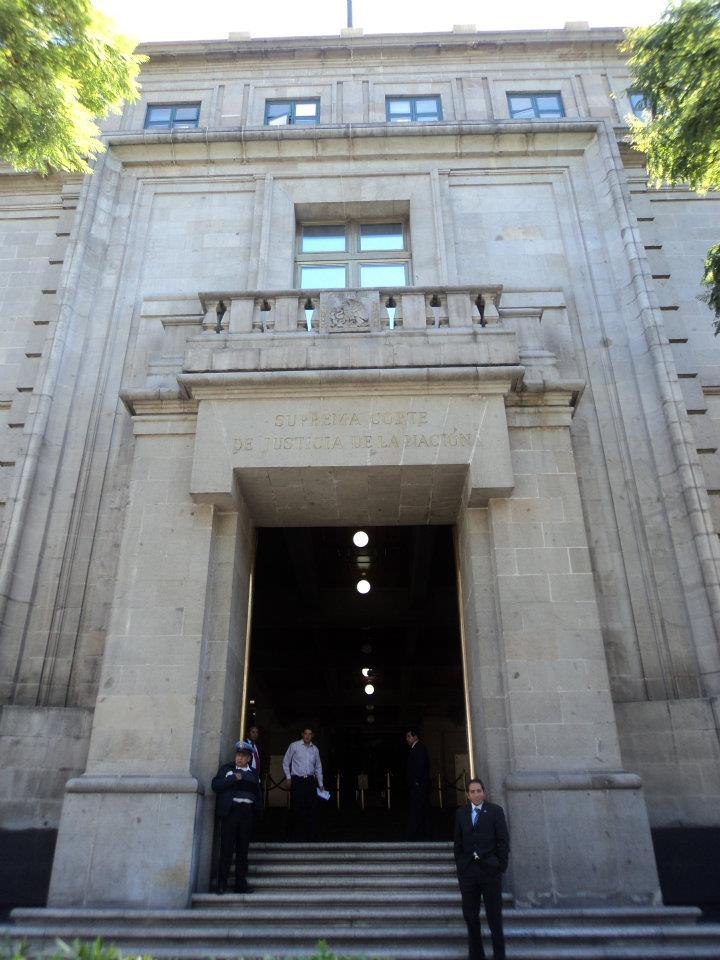
Entrance to the court

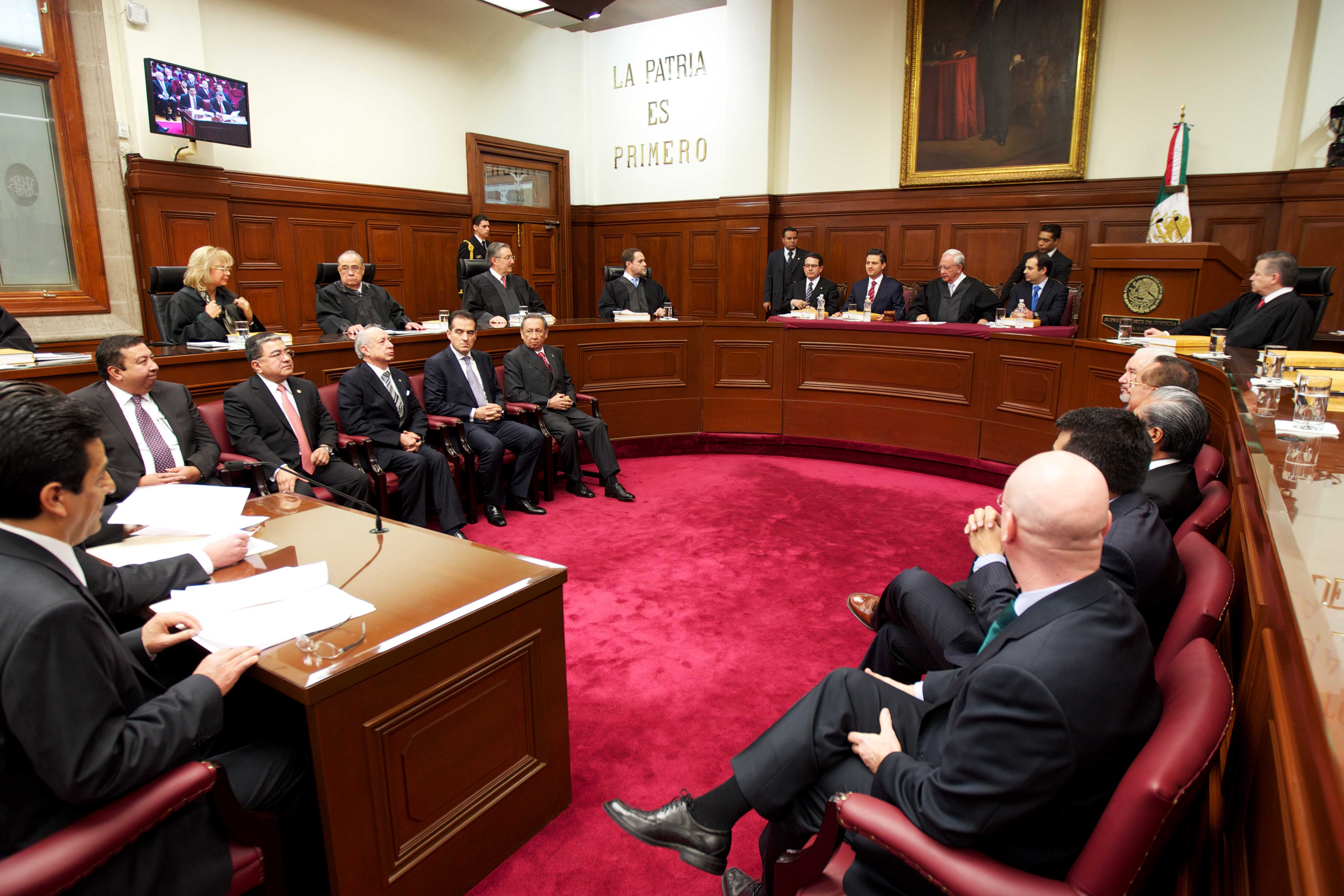
One of the chambers of the Supreme Court

== See also ==
- List of Justices of the Supreme Court of Mexico (1917–1995)
