= Controversies in the 2006 Mexican general election =

According to the official count, López Obrador held an advantage over Calderón right until 97.50% of the polling stations were counted, after which Calderón overtook the first place by a difference of less than 1% of the votes.

The Mexican general election of July 2, 2006, was the most hotly contested election in Mexican history and as such, the results were controversial. According to the Federal Electoral Institute (IFE), the initial "Quick Count" determined the race was too close to call, and when the "Official Count" was complete, Felipe Calderón of the right-of-center National Action Party (PAN) had won by a difference of 243,934 votes (or 0.58%). The runner-up, Andrés Manuel López Obrador of the left-of-center Coalition for the Good of All (PRD, PT, Convergence), immediately challenged the results and led massive marches, protests, and acts of civil resistance in Mexico City. On August 9, while protests continued to expand, a partial recount was undertaken by election officials after being ordered to do so by the country's Federal Electoral Tribunal (TEPJF, sometimes referred to by the acronym of its predecessor, the TRIFE). The tribunal ordered the recount of the polling stations that were ruled to have evidence of irregularities, which were about nine percent of the total.

On September 5 the tribunal declared that Felipe Calderón met all the constitutional requirements in order to be elected, and was declared president-elect. Some civil resistance acts led by Andrés Manuel López Obrador were maintained in an attempt to encourage a change in the country's opinion, as well as other activities such as a documentary by Mexican filmmaker Luis Mandoki.

In November 2026, Vicente Fox, the president of Mexico during the election, said in an interview with The Objective: "I made sure Calderón won, although it's not very democratic to say that, but I told myself that the country's leadership should remain in the hands of my party". Fox later said that his words had been taken out of context and that he referred that Calderón won because of "[Fox's] strong performance" as president. Consequently, Obradorists from Morena called for the creation of a commission to investigate the election.

== Elections and results ==
On Sunday July 2, 2006, Mexico held its first presidential election of the post-PRI (Institutional Revolutionary Party) era. Media polls had predicted a very tight race.

To understand some of the allegations and controversies, it will be useful to know some of the details of how the votes were counted and how the partial results were reported.

=== Vote counting ===
Since the 1997 federal elections, elections in Mexico had been overseen by the (now dissolved) Federal Electoral Institute, known by its Spanish acronym IFE. Prior to 1997, elections were run by the federal government's Secretaría de Gobernación (interior ministry). The law governing elections was the Federal Code for Electoral Institutions and Procedures, the COFIPE. The COFIPE was amended after the election of 2006; references to articles in this section refer to the COFIPE as it stood during the election in 2006, unless explicitly noted otherwise.

Under the law then in force, each polling place was manned by randomly selected citizens from the corresponding district, who formed the Mesa Directiva (Directing Committee). They received a training session from the IFE prior to the election. In addition to the polling place officers, each party, coalition, or alliance participating in the election could name up to two observers and one alternate for each polling place (article 198 of the COFIPE).

In order to vote, citizens were required to present a valid credencial para votar con fotografía (voter identification card, with photograph). The card was checked against the official voter list for the polling place, which contained facsimiles of each card. The voter was then given the blank ballots and directed to the booth to mark them secretly. People unable to read or who had a physical impairment could be accompanied by a single person they themselves designated. The citizen then folded the ballots, and deposited them in the corresponding ballot boxes. Then, the Secretary of the Directing Committee would write "voted" in the entry corresponding to the citizen in the official voter list, the identification card was marked and returned to the voter, and their right thumb marked with indelible ink (article 218). The party and coalition representatives voted in the booth to which they are assigned, and were logged in special entries in the voter list. During the voting, the party representatives could file complaints in writing, which were received by the Chair and logged by the Secretary (article 221). A specified number of "special voting places" were also installed for people voting outside their polling place. Their thumbs were inspected before allowing them to vote, and the data logged. They were allowed to cast votes in all elections corresponding to both the location of the special voting place and their own registry; for example, if they were voting in their state but outside their district they were allowed to cast votes for senator and president, but not for district deputy (article 223).

Voting stopped at 6 pm or whenever anyone who was in line to vote at 6 pm was done voting (article 224); the poll could be closed earlier only if all members of the Directing Committee agreed that all registered voters had cast their vote. Once the polling place closed, the Directing Committee was in charge of counting and recording the votes, in the presence of the party representatives (article 229 of the COFIPE). After the counting was over, the totals for each candidate, the total of write-in votes, the total of annulled votes, and the total of left-over blank ballots were recorded in the Acta de Escrutinio (official tally sheet); in addition, any incidents that occurred during the voting or counting would be described in writing (article 232). Finally, every member of the Directing Committee and every party representative present were required to sign the tally sheet; the latter were allowed to sign under protest and explain their reasons, if they so desired (article 233).

A file was then made for the polling place. The file contained a copy of the log (Acta de la jornada electoral), a copy of the signed tally sheet, and a copy of any protests filed. Separate packets contained the unused ballots, the annulled ballots, and the valid votes. A separate envelope contained the list of voters. Finally, all files were placed together in a sealed packet; the sealed packet was then signed by every member of the Directing Committee, and any party representative who so desired (article 234).

Each party representative then received a copy of the official tally sheet; the representative was then required to sign a proof of receipt. On the outside of the sealed electoral packet a transparent envelope containing a signed copy of the official tally sheet was placed (article 235). The chair of the Directing Committee then placed an enlarged copy of the final tallies in a visible location outside of the polling place; this copy was supposed to be signed by the Chair, and could be signed by any other members of the Committee and party representatives who so desired (article 236). Finally, the polling place was then officially closed, and the Chair of the Directing Committee (with any party representatives who so desired) delivered the sealed packet and documentation to the District Office, where the official count (see below) began some days later. Polling places next to the District Office were required to deliver it "immediately" upon closure of the polling place. Urban polling places located away from the District Office were required to deliver the packets within 12 hours, and rural polling places within 24 hours of closure (article 238).

=== PREP ===
The IFE was mandated by law to provide quick information and a fast estimate of the electoral results, but it had no authority to determine the outcome of the election.

The IFE had two systems in place. One is the Programa de Resultados Electorales Preliminares (Preliminary Electoral Results Program, known by its initials PREP); the second was the Conteo Rápido (Quick Count). Although the two were often confused, they were in fact two separate systems.

The PREP is a mechanism to make public the results of the election. As soon as the polls closed and the votes were tallied in each polling place, a copy of the acta de escrutinio (the official tallies from the polling place) was sealed in a special envelope with a transparent window. It was then sent to a Center for Information Collation and Transmission (Centro de Acopio y Transmisión de Datos or CEDAT) that was located in the corresponding electoral district. There, the information was captured and transmitted to the central offices of the IFE for public dissemination. The information was then backed up and made public on the IFE website and a number of mirrors. The PREP is not an estimate or a statistical exercise, but rather the full unofficial returns from each polling place, as they were computed at the polls on the day of the election. They are not official returns, since the tallies must be certified by the District's Electoral Council before they become official. The PREP would continue to collate data until all polling places reported or until the early morning hours of Monday July 3. If the tally sheets contained certain inconsistencies (e.g., blank entries rather than zeros, illegible totals, etc.), then they were reported separately, under the heading of Irregular, as per prior agreement between the parties, and were not added to the totals as they were received. Where possible, their results were added when the final report was made on Monday morning.

In the PREP, election results were posted as they were being received by the IFE. Calderón quickly overtook a very early lead by López Obrador and kept a diminishing lead until the end.

=== Quick count ===
The Conteo Rápido (Quick Count), on the other hand, was a statistical attempt at predicting the trend of the election. On the night of the election, a random selection out of a representative sampling of 7,636 polling places was to be selected, and statistical analysis would then be performed in an attempt to predict the winner. The agreement regarding the Conteo Rápido was as follows: Using the results that had been obtained by 10:00 pm on July 2, the technical committee would perform a statistical analysis (described below). Once it was finished, the committee would give Luis Carlos Ugalde, the president of the IFE, a report with one of four recommendations/conclusions: (i) that there was sufficient clarity and assurances as to which political party would get the most votes; (ii) that more time was needed to obtain further data that would clarify the conclusions; (iii) that the race was too close to call; or (iv) that there was an insufficient scientific basis to apply the tests on the samples obtained. Ugalde would then make the conclusions of the report public; again, as per prior agreement, in case (i) the winner would be announced; in case (ii), an announcement would be made to that effect and the announcement of the conclusion postponed for no more than two hours; and in case (iii) the race would be labeled "too close to call" and the precise results (i.e., who was ahead according to the analysis) would not be revealed. According to the official report it had been decided in advance that a winner would be announced and the election called only if the separation between the intervals corresponding to the first two places was greater than 0.6%.

At 10:15 pm on July 2, a random sampling of 7,263 polling places (out of an original representative sampling of 7,636 polling places) was selected. Three statistical tests were performed on the sampling. A "robust" test, meant to provide conservative estimates as controls for the other two methods; a classic test; and a Bayesian test. The robust test predicted Calderón would get between 35.25% and 37.4% of the vote, versus 34.24% to 36.38% for López Obrador. The classic test predicted 35.68% to 36.53% for Calderón, versus 34.97% to 35.7% for López Obrador. The Bayesian test predicted Calderón with 35.77% to 36.40% versus López Obrador with 35.07% to 35.63% (see page 24 in the official report). Only the Bayesian test gave definitive results, but with a distance between intervals of less than 0.15%. Around 11 pm Luis Carlos Ugalde announced on live television that the technical committee had concluded the difference too small and that the race was too close to call. As per the original prior agreement between IFE and all political parties, Ugalde did not divulge the results of the Quick Count. Later that night, the representatives of the PAN and the Coalition For the Good of All requested that the results from the Quick Count be made public, while the representative of the Alliance for Mexico (the PRI and PVEM alliance whose candidate was Roberto Madrazo Pintado, who finished a distant third) requested that the prior agreement of confidentiality be respected. Contradictory rumors of whom the count had favored were beginning to surface, and the official report was released a few days later to the press and through the IFE's website to quash them.

The final official count (see next section) gave Calderón 35.89% of the vote, while López Obrador received 35.31%, confirming the prediction of the Quick Count.

=== Official count ===
Calderón vs. López Obrador in IFE reports. Note that this graph covers 3.5 percentage points from the top to the bottom of the vertical scale. Click to enlarge.

In accordance with the COFIPE (the Spanish acronym for the Federal Code of Electoral Procedures and Institutions), the Official Count began on Wednesday July 5, 2006. The sealed ballot packages together with their signed actas de escrutinio y cómputo (official tally sheets) were collected by the District's Electoral Council. Each tally sheet was examined for possible errors or alterations; Council members from any party are allowed to raise certain objections, and under a specified set of circumstances packages could be opened and examined; for example, the package could be opened and recounted in the case of an illegible tally sheet. The District Electoral Council would then certify the totals from each package and polling place, and remit the results to the IFE.

The process took approximately 30 hours of continuous uninterrupted work. The IFE made public the results as they were being received and tabulated from all 300 of the country's Electoral Councils, one per congressional district. The results were tabulated live; an early lead by López Obrador dwindled slowly until Calderón overtook him in the early hours of Thursday morning. Unlike the PREP, the Official Count tallied votes in a more organized manner. Information received from the District Councils was added to the running count in the order of the district number, as they arrived to the office. The Councils themselves examined the electoral packages in numerical order. Returns from several northern states which had heavily favored the PAN according to the PREP were in particular slow to arrive; the delay was at least partially attributable to double checking of the tally sheets. Under Mexican Law, any political party could ask for the double-check, and raise objections. The campaign coordinator for Calderón blamed the delay on dilatory tactics by the PRD representatives in those districts.

The final vote count reported on July 6 showed that Calderón obtained 35.89% (15,000,284 votes), while López Obrador received 35.31% (14,756,350 votes). The difference between the two was 243,934 votes (or 0.58%).

=== Recount and appeals ===
On Saturday, August 5, the TEPJF met in public session to rule on López Obrador's filings alleging irregularities and requesting recounts. The seven magistrates voted unanimously that there was sufficient legal justification to order a recount in only 11,839 ballot boxes in 155 districts (9.2% of the total), thus rejecting López Obrador's public demand that all votes and ballot boxes be recounted.

The Tribunal based its decision of a partial recount on the fact that, despite publicly demanding a "vote-by-vote" general recount, López Obrador's party only presented legal claims for fewer than 44,000 polling stations, or less than 34%. Therefore, legally, only those 44,000 polling stations were deemed controversial by the TEPJF. The Tribunal ruled that the non-controversial votes should not be recounted, because "the certainty asked by the Coalition (of López Obrador's party) is tied to the respect of the citizen counts in non-controversial polling stations". However, the Tribunal did certify that principles of certainty in the elections called for a justified recount in some of the controversial stations, as irregularities were found there.

The partial recount of votes in the disputed election began on August 9 amid escalating protests against alleged electoral irregularities in the close election.

On August 28, the TEPJF announced the results of the partial recount, subtracting 81,080 votes for Calderón, 76,897 votes for López Obrador, 63,114 for Roberto Madrazo, 5,962 for Patricia Mercado, 2,743 for Roberto Campa, and 7,940 for the remaining candidates. A total of 237,736 votes were annulled out of the approximately 4 million votes recounted. Than means around 6% of the recounted votes were annulled.

== Election observers ==
There were national and international election observers.

There was a mission of election observers from the European Union. From their June 15, 2006, press release:

"The EOM [Election Observation Mission] Core Team, in support of the Chief Observer, comprises 9 election experts and has been deployed to Mexico since early June. They will be shortly joined by 66 Long-Term Observers, who will be deployed throughout the country to observe the campaign period and pre-election preparations as well as Election Day and the post-election period."

El Universal reported that the mission was present in all the states of Mexico and the Federal District since June 22. After the election, José Ignacio Salafranca, chief of the EU delegation, said he considered the election clean and the decision of the Electoral Tribunal as fair.

Mark Almond, an election observer in several countries, such as Georgia and Ukraine, where he had worked with the BHHRG, a group which is accused of producing fraudulent reports about elections in Georgia and Ukraine as well denying the Rwandan genocide, (but who did not participate as an observer in the Mexican election), questioned the objectivity of the mass media in general and Salafranca in particular, citing the latter's political affiliation with Spain's Partido Popular, considered to be ideologically close to the PAN. Almond writes:

"Salafranca has a track record as an election observer. In Lebanon's general elections in 2005 he had no problem with the pro-western faction sweeping the board around Beirut with fewer than a quarter of voters taking part and nine of its seats gained without even a token alternative candidate. 'It is a feast of democracy,' he declared. His mood changed when the democratic banquet moved to areas dominated by Hizbullah or the Christian maverick General Aoun. Suddenly, 'vote-buying' and the need for 'fundamental reform' popped up in the EU observation reports."

The Global Exchange group of 24 international observers, which has produced disinformation against the World Trade Organization, claims it found electoral fraud or irregularities at all of the 60 polling places it observed, and called for a full recount. The Mexican election watchdog group Alianza Cívica (Civic Alliance) also claimed that many irregularities occurred.

Sophie McNeill, an Australian TV reporter for SBS Dateline Australia, reported:

So why is the majority of the press repeating that the presence of international observers ensured that the election was clean and fair? "It was the electoral tribunal itself that put out that press release about the observer's," Global Exchange President Ted Lewis told me. "We were really annoyed with them when they did that. And about two thirds of the other observers were diplomats who are not allowed to make public comments."

Sophie McNeill also reported in that article that there were 673 international election observers, and that they "only oversaw a fraction of the country's 130 thousand polling stations."

== Alleged irregularities ==
The day after the July 2, 2006, elections, the left-leaning newspaper La Jornada published reports of supposed electoral irregularities and López Obrador's claims that the ruling party had won the election through a supposed "fraud" escalated.

=== Illegal campaigning ===
During the run-up to the election, José María Aznar, the former Prime Minister and honorary chairman of the Popular Party in Spain, was alleged to have illegally interfered with the election, as described in Article 33 of the constitution of Mexico.

While Hugo Chávez was President of Venezuela at the time he made his comments, José María Aznar was not head of government of any nation when he made his comments. Additionally, Hugo Chávez made his comments in public and through broadcasting media, while Aznar's comments were made in a private meeting with PAN members and were not intended for broadcasting.

=== Zavala accusations ===
On June 6, during the second presidential debate, López Obrador alleged that Calderón's brother-in-law, Diego Heriberto Zavala Gómez, had failed to pay taxes on earnings of two and a half billion pesos that Zavala had obtained in favorable government contracts obtained while Calderón was Energy Secretary. López Obrador called Zavala the cuñado incómodo (inconvenient brother-in-law), a play on the nickname inconvenient brother of Raúl Salinas de Gortari.

The Calderón campaign and Zavala denied the accusations. El Universal reported on June 8 that according to Compranet, the government's procurement database, Zavala had three contracts related to the energy sector, all of them after Calderón had left office; and that his companies had a total of 18 contracts since 2003, totaling 129 million pesos.

On Friday June 9, 2006, López Obrador promised to deliver documentation that would prove the allegations. Later that day, Claudia Sheinbaum from the López Obrador campaign arrived at Calderón campaign headquarters with three filing boxes. They were met outside by the vice-coordinator of Calderón's campaign, and by the press and a notary public who had been called by the Calderón campaign. The vice-coordinator of the campaign insisted that the boxes be opened and the contents catalogued and witnessed by the notary public before they were brought inside. A verbal confrontation ensued; during this confrontation, the boxes were opened and it was found that they were almost empty and contained only a handful of copies of documents the PRD had made public previously, and three CDs. Sheinbaum attempted to explain what the contents were, but a shouting and shoving match began among PAN and PRD members present. The accusations against Zavala were discontinued after the confrontation, though they were never withdrawn.

=== Federal Electoral Institute corruption allegations ===
In April 2006, amid allegations that one of Felipe Calderón's brothers-in-law, Diego Hildebrando Zavala Gómez del Campo, was involved in the elections, the IFE declared that Hildebrando company did not participate in the implementation of the PREP. However, it was discovered later that year that Sagem Défense Sécurité, a French company of which Hildebrando is a partner, did provide biometric verification of the database of voters for the IFE.

An October 12, 2006, article by journalist John Ross claimed that Elba Esther Gordillo, the head of the National Education Workers Union (SNTE), was aligned with the PAN. The article also stated, "Prior to July 2nd, Gordillo had corrupted the governing circles of the IFE—its president, the now-reviled Luis Carlos Ugalde, and three members of the governing counsel were Gordillo appointees and the teachers union czarina used her muscle to have 22,000 IFE polling place and district officials replaced by her people during the final weeks of the campaign."

=== Vote buying ===
The Global Exchange final report states: "...since vote buyers can know the results at each polling place, they can threaten to cut off benefits unless a community produces a determined number or percentage of votes for their party." The report also states: "According to research conducted by Alianza Cívica in the 2006 electoral cycle, a significant percentage of social program beneficiaries have been approached by persons who would condition receipt of program benefits upon electoral outcomes."

Julia Murphy, a University of Calgary anthropology professor, was a Global Exchange observer. A University of Calgary newspaper reported:

"When we showed up, there was some funny business going on," said Murphy. As people came out of the polling station, PRI representatives gave them 100 pesos and a T-shirt, she explained. "It's ingrained in the PRI," Murphy said, citing the practice of buying votes and pressuring voters.

In his book El mito del fraude electoral en México ("The myth of electoral fraud in Mexico"), Fernando Pliego Carrasco made a study of the beneficiaries of several government social programs, sorted by the marginalization index of the electoral district in which they lived. The programs he considered were the "Desarrollo Local Microrregiones" program ("Microregion Local Development"), and the "Desarrollo Humano Oportunidades" ("Opportunities Human Development") programs of the federal government, and to a lesser extent the program of "Empleo Temporal" ("Temporal Employment"), "Vivienda Rural" ("Rural Housing"), and "Atención a los Adultos Mayores en Zonas Rurales" ("Help for the Elderly in Rural Zones"). The first two were specifically mentioned by the Alianza por el Bien de Todos in their judicial filings. Pliego Carrasco is a Ph.D. in Social Sciences by the Colegio de Mexico, specializing in Sociology, and is a researcher at the Institute of Social Research of the Universidad Nacional Autónoma de México.

Pliego Carrasco criticizes the Alianza's filings by stating that they were based only on individual situations rather than a widespread study, that the information was based almost invariably on newspaper clippings, and that they only studied 26 districts. For his own study, Pliego Carrasco contrasted the growth in votes from the 2000 to the 2006 election for all parties. In all cases, the Alianza increased substantially more than the PAN, which even lost votes in the two categories of lowest marginalization. His conclusion is that there was no evidence that the PAN benefited from the expenditures. He found no statistical correlation between expenditures and the winning candidate. He derived similar conclusions for the other four programs. His conclusion is that the vote distribution does not support the hypothesis that social programs were used wholesale to influence the vote.

=== Ballot packets opening ===
Al Giordano's July 11, 2006, article has a La Jornada photo of a July 10 protest outside the office of the Federal Electoral Institute in the Tabasco town of Comalcalco. Giordano writes: "Trapped inside are at least ten IFE officials who, according to eyewitnesses, illegally entered the building, brought sealed ballot boxes out into the patio, and began to open them, breaking the official seals. They were seen revising anew the 'actas' with the vote tallies and recounting the ballots, without, as the law requires, the presence of representatives from all the political parties."

On July 16 La Jornada claimed that 40% of the vote packets nationwide had been reopened illegally by the IFE. IFE officials later explained that the opening of the packets was not illegal, and that it only served to satisfy a petition by López Obrador's Coalition.

=== Ballots found in trash ===
There were various reports of ballots found in the trash.

In Ciudad Nezahualcóyotl and in Xalapa, used ballots and other electoral materials were found in rubbish dumps.

Al Giordano of Narco News wrote on July 5, 2006, of ballots discovered in the Nezahuacoyotl garbage dump. The article also has an El Universal photo of the garbage dump. His July 8 article has a La Jornada photo of three completed ballots found in a Mexico City trash can.

Reforma later reported that the Federal Prosecutor in Electoral Crimes stated that no one had judicially made an accusation regarding the illegal use or appropriation of electoral material, and that the alleged ballots in the Nezahualcoyotl garbage dump were in fact photocopies of electoral reports, and not ballots. She also added that the PRD had not filed a suit or a judicial accusation to any of their public remarks.

=== Videos ===
In a July 10, 2006, press conference, López Obrador showed a video in which a man was seen taking several ballots and depositing them in a ballot box. López Obrador alleged the video, and a second one he also distributed, was proof of "pregnant ballot boxes", a euphemism for ballot stuffing.

Within a few hours, the IFE and the polling station officials explained that between 8 and 10 ballots for the election to the Lower House had been incorrectly placed in the presidential ballot box (this could be seen because the ballots for the presidential, senatorial, and lower house elections were printed on different colored paper, to match the colors of the boxes). Article 231 of the COFIPE states that ballots placed in the incorrect box should be moved to the correct box. The president of the polling station ordered the ballots moved to the correct box, and all representatives present agreed to this. The video had been recorded by the representative of the Coalition, who also signed the report that explained it in the official tally sheet. On July 11, both the president of the polling place and the observer representing López Obrador's Coalition confirmed that this was indeed what had occurred.

In response, López Obrador accused his own Coalition observer of corruption, saying "Not every one of our observers acted properly" and that "there was a lot of money involved, and we know some of our representatives were offered money." When asked if they had any proof of this, he said they did not.

=== Annulled votes ===
In a master complaint of around 900 pages López Obrador's party claimed that 900,000 annulled votes were from areas that voted more strongly for him.

=== PREP ===
There were various claims of the possibility of fraud concerning the PREP results, and also the official count that followed. Many people confused the two and were further thrown by several differences between them. For example, the PREP listed polling booth-by-polling booth, district-by-district, and state-by-state running totals in addition to a full running total by candidate. The report of the Official Count, on the other hand, only gave the full running totals by candidate, obtained by adding results as they were reported at the district council level. The order in which tallies were added was also different (see discussion elsewhere in this article). Finally, the behavior of the running tallies for the candidates was also very different: in the unofficial PREP count Calderón quickly overtook a very early lead by López Obrador and kept a diminishing lead until the end, while in the official count López Obrador led from the first report on, until Calderon overtook him near the end of the count.

==== Statistical anomalies ====
Physics professor Jorge A. López did a statistical analysis of the PREP results. There was some discussion among statistics experts, and other non-expert readers, about that analysis at a Columbia University blog on "Statistical Modeling, Causal Inference, and Social Science."

In a July 19, 2006, comment to his July 17 article Professor James K. Galbraith writes: "For the PREP data, the issue of whether we are seeing 'cyberfraud' or a more traditional kind is a red herring, in my view. I did not use the term 'cyberfraud' in my essay. In principle, the anomalies observed could be generated electronically, or manually. Or, to be complete, they could have innocent explanations; however so far these have not been provided." Professor Galbraith holds the Lloyd M Bentsen Jr chair of government/business relations at the Lyndon B Johnson school of public affairs, the University of Texas.

Physics professor Luis Mochán also did several analyses of the PREP results; one involved the evolution over time of the PREP results. An August 2, 2006 AlterNet article writes: "Mochán notes that these statistical anomalies aren't definitive proof of anything."

In his book El mito del fraude electoral en México ("The myth of the electoral fraud in Mexico") Fernando Pliego Carrasco considered the timing of the results and related them to the "marginalization degree" of the electoral districts, as determined by the Consejo Nacional de Población's 2005 census. The marginalization degree of a district is a measure of the affluence of the district, its infrastructure, population centers size, and educational level. Very low marginalization represents an affluent district with good infrastructure and large, educated population. Very high marginalization represents a poor district with little or very poor infrastructure, and small, largely uneducated population.

The table below shows the results of the PREP, sorted by marginalization degree and candidate.

PREP Results, sorted by marginalization degree of polling place
Marginalization degree	Calderón	% of total	López Obrador	% of total	Madrazo	% of total
Very low	9,944,226	24.18%	8,793,379	21.38%	4,560,137	11.09%
Low	2,037,185	4.95%	2,090,675	5.08%	1,365,348	3.32%
Medium	1,420,340	3.45%	1,637,675	3.98%	1,274,669	3.10%
High	1,146,928	2.79%	1,532,211	3.73%	1,424,296	3.46%
Very High	222,330	0.54%	459,537	1.12%	503,439	1.22%
Total	14,771,009	35.91%	14,513,477	35.29%	9,127,889	22.19%

The marginalization degree of the district was directly related to the time it took for the results to be carried to the corresponding CEDAT. Those of very low marginalization took an average of 4:31 hours; those of low marginalization an average of 6:14 hours; medium marginalization an average of 6:54 hours; high marginalization 8:45 hours; and very high marginalization an average of 10:32 hours. The time it took to get results from a polling place to the corresponding CEDAT was also directly related to the average distance between the polling place and the CEDAT. Almost two thirds of Calderón's votes came from districts with very low marginalization, arriving first, with almost three percentage points advantage over López Obrador. Moreover, it was only on those districts that Calderón obtained victories, while López Obrador was ahead mainly in districts with low, medium, and high marginalization; Madrazo only won in some districts with very high marginalization. Pliego Carrasco states that taking all these factors into consideration completely explains the behavior of the partial tallies, in particular the changes in the rates of growth that began occurring around 9 pm, and the further changes (outlined by the Alianza in their judicial filings) between 2 and 3 am. Pliego Carrasco criticizes Mochán and others for not considering the marginalization and the distance between districts and the corresponding CEDAT, and for considering only a very rough urban/rural sorting of the districts and using methods and techniques that are valid for the natural sciences and engineering but that he considers unjustified in their application to social sciences.

In a letter published on August 31, 2006, in La Jornada, José Woldenberg wrote in part:

"[There was the claim that there] was an 'algorithm' that modified the results of the PREP. In the end the fantasy caved in among other things because the PREP is only a mechanism to put within reach of the citizens and the political parties information about the preliminary results, but it is not the official mechanism to tally the votes. Besides, since the political parties have in their possession a very high number of tally sheets, they can check if their results coincide or not with those of the PREP (which are displayed polling place by polling place). Later the suspicion was expanded by noting the tallies-over-time of the PREP and of the district councils did not follow the same tendencies. The explanation of this alleged 'anomaly' turned out to be both easy and forceful: the fundamental variable that explains the collection of information in the PREP is the distance between the polling place and the district council (plus how slowly or quickly the polling place itself tallies the votes), while in the district councils the count advances as a function of the speed with which the tally sheets are confronted by the councils themselves, the discussion that takes place in them, and whether or not the electoral packets are opened."

José Woldenberg was a founding member of the Unified Socialist Party of Mexico (PSUM, 1981), the Mexican Socialist Party (PMS, 1987) and the PRD, which he left in April 1991. He was president of the IFE from 1996 to 2003 and oversaw the 2000 general election.

==== Allegations of added or missing votes (overvotes and undervotes) ====
On July 10, 2006, Frontera NorteSur, reporting on an initial analysis by Civic Alliance, wrote: "In the Lopez Obrador strongholds, 312,450 more votes for senators than president were tallied, while in the pro-Calderon zones, 403,740 more votes for president than senators were tabulated." However, they do not specify which candidate seems to benefit from this. For example, in the PAN stronghold of Guanajuato, both candidates received almost exactly the same number of votes above their corresponding senatorial candidate, with López Obrador edging Calderón by 51,498 to 51,283

The Civic Alliance claimed that in some Calderón strongholds the number of votes cast greatly exceeded the number of registered voters. Pliego Carrasco, however, (see analysis below) found that the totals were similar for polling places carried by López Obrador.

López Obrador also claimed that there were 1,621,187 votes added or missing from 72,197 polling stations (55.33% of total number nationwide). See article and chart with breakdown of numbers: It also has links in the sidebar to various scientific studies on the presidential election results.

Luis Mochán analyzed the overvotes and undervotes for those polling places that had sufficient data intact to do so, basing both totals and controls on the PREP. He used four different methods and came up with between 1.5 and 2.35 million overvotes and undervotes; these are calculated by comparing the number of votes plus the number of blank ballots remaining as reported in the PREP with sundry other numbers also taken from the PREP: the total number of voters signed in, the total number of ballots originally allotted to the polling place, and so on. Note that this vote count analysis is separate from his analysis of statistical anomalies in the PREP voting timeline. His September 7, 2006, paper (in English) discusses both of these analyses.

Some, including Mochán in his article note that undervotes may result from citizens who decide not to cast their ballot; overvotes may result from poll workers failing to register a citizen in the log; and so on.

According to Mochán (p. 14 in) others have speculated in the press that the majority of overvotes and undervotes come from so-called "contiguous polling places" and are the result of confusion on the part of the voters, who deposited their ballots in the wrong box (the explanation follows). Mochán neither confirms nor denies the provenance of the overvotes and undervotes, and only reports aggregated totals.

The reason for this possible confusion is the following: the law places a hard limit of 750 voters per polling place (article 192.2 of the COFIPE). For districts with a high population density (particularly in cities), usually a single location will contain several polling places in order to split the voters among them (article 192.3.B). These polling places are usually assigned a single number; one is designated as the "basic" polling place, and the others are designated with a second number identifying them as "contiguous 1", "contiguous 2", etc. Each one has its own officials and ballot boxes. However, being in close proximity (often without any physical separation between them) it is not uncommon for voters to be confused as to which box corresponds to which polling place (this kind of error is mentioned several times in Mochán's article; see e.g. pp. 10 and 14 in).

This confusion results in a ballot for one polling place being deposited in the ballot box corresponding to an officially different polling place, giving both an undervote for the correct polling place and an overvote for the incorrect one. According to the COFIPE (Federal Code of Electoral Institutions and Procedures), article 231 a ballot which is placed in the wrong box should be moved to the correct box if possible (as is the case, for example, if the presidential ballot is deposited in the senatorial ballot box), but should in any case be counted and reported. A single such vote would appear as both an undervote and an overvote in the analyses and reports mentioned above.

Mochán's article reports almost three times as many undervotes as overvotes in the aggregated totals.

Mochán notes that "it is quite probable that many of the inconsistencies has [sic] its origin in errors made without malice", listing several possible such errors (some mentioned explicitly above). Mochán strongly stresses that in his opinion these and other explanations considered are "not enough to explain the magnitude of errors." Mochán's analyses are about the PREP numbers. The PREP totals are ignored when the official count begins, and do not have any legal validity for the purposes of deciding the election. On the other hand, the existence of overvotes and of undervotes is one of the grounds for requesting that an electoral packet be opened and recounted. Mochán notes that the official totals does not include the information on leftover blank ballots, so that a verification of undervotes and overvotes in the case of adding up errors is impossible.

The Center for Economic and Policy Research (CEPR) reported that "61,192 of 126,139 ballot boxes contained 'adding up' errors. Election workers received a fixed and recorded number of blank ballots for each ballot box, and were instructed to keep track of them. Yet for nearly half of all ballot boxes, the total votes plus leftover blank ballots did not add up to the number of ballots received."

Pliego Carrasco compared the size and type of the errors in the different polling places, sorted according to who won the polling place. For example, for polling places in which the number of ballots issued to the polling place is different from the number of votes tallied plus the number of leftover ballots, he gives the table below. The FCH column gives the number of polling places where Calderón received the most votes that exhibited that type of error, while the AMLO column shows the number where López Obrador received the most votes. Undervotes refers to the case where the number of votes tallied plus the number of leftover ballots is less than the number of blank ballots allocated to the polling place, while Overvotes is the case where the number of allocated blank ballots is less than the votes tallied plus leftover ballots. The numbers are also taken from the PREP.

Number of polling places where the number of votes tallied plus leftover ballots differed from number of blank ballots allotted
Type of error	Range	FCH	%	AMLO	%
Undervotes	101 or more	292	0.5%	252	0.5%
	21 to 100	829	1.4%	923	1.8%
	11 to 20	1,176	2.1%	1,328	2.5%
	6 to 10	2,181	3.8%	2,350	4.5%
	1 to 5	12,123	21.2%	11,100	21.2%
No error		29,455	51.5%	25,404	48.4%
Overvotes	1 to 5	7,246	12.7%	7,105	13.5%
	6 to 10	1,418	2.5%	1,439	2.7%
	11 to 20	783	1.4%	732	1.4%
	21 to 100	768	1.3%	852	1.6%
	101 or more	944	1.6%	982	1.9%

Pliego Carrasco notes that both the absolute and relative numbers are very close for both candidates. He found similar results for errors where the number of votes tallied is different from the number of voters registered as having voted in the official rolls; where the tallied total is different from the number of ballots in the box; and where the number of ballots in the box differs from the number of voters registered as having voted in the official votes. Taking into account the number of errors per polling place, again the results are very similar for all candidates. His conclusion is that there was no bias in the arithmetic errors (in other words, they were not present more often in the polling places won by one or the other candidate); he concludes that the errors were likely caused by the normal distribution of mathematical and organizational abilities of the randomly selected citizens in the polling place, and in the sometimes confusing design of the tally sheets and inadequate training of polling place workers.

=== Counting votes in the official count ===
In the official count López Obrador was ahead until late in the count. The official count does not use computers to count the votes. It tallies the totals from the actas as they are certified by the district boards. Every party has physical copies of every certified acta, and a representative in every district board.

The votes were not counted randomly, but in order of the districts, with Mexico City, a López Obrador stronghold, coming first, and the pro-Calderón North coming last. See the PREP, Quick Count, and Official count sections of the article farther up.

The IFE did not put up the official count results by precinct. The report of the Official Count online only gave the full running totals by candidate, obtained by adding results as they were reported at the district council level.

The Official Count does not necessarily reopen the ballot packets and do a full vote-by-vote recount. It mostly only tabulates the numbers from the 130,000 sets of official paperwork (the "actas") for the hand counts previously done for all of the 130,000 precincts. Because the packets usually remain closed, some claim that much of the fraud and irregularities allegedly done at the precinct level would not be discovered by the official count. Although the representatives from any political parties in the district board may request that a packet be opened and recounted, this can only be done under specific sets of circumstances listed in the COFIPE (article 247; though the article refers only to the elections to the Chamber of Deputies, it is explicitly referred to elsewhere, e.g. article 250 for presidential elections). For example, the package could be opened and recounted in the case of an illegible, missing, or inconsistent tally sheet.

"A copy of the 'acta' was supposed to be given to the IFE officer and each party representative, one copy had to be displayed outside of the polling place, and another copy had to be included with the ballots in the packages that everyone there had to seal and send to their respective electoral district." There are several locations on the web that have copies of the actas.

The only result that counts legally for a precinct is the "acta" signed by the election officials for that precinct. There were many claims of fraud and discrepancies between the actas and IFE's PREP results. There are photos comparing actas to PREP results.

=== "Old fashioned fraud" ===
Charges that there had been a "cybernetic fraud" began to surface on Monday, July 3, 2006. Questions were raised about "lost votes", differences between results reported in the PREP and tally sheets, and other alleged anomalies. The charges and questions multiplied after July 5 when the running totals of the Official Count behaved differently from the ones in the PREP.

During the next week and a half, PRD's president Leonel Cota and some of the main figures in López Obrador's campaign, including Ricardo Monreal, Claudia Sheinbaum, and Manuel Camacho Solís, gave numerous interviews in which they explained how the cybernetic fraud had allegedly occurred, through the use of "an algorithm" in the IFEs computers, and demanded an audit of the computer code used in the PREP. Several reports quoted earlier in this article also referred to these problems and allegations.

However, on July 17, 2006, in a radio interview with Miguel Ángel Granados Chapa on Radio UNAM, López Obrador said:

"I'm going to tell you something I have not said, but I think it will help us understand why we arrived at this information: there was much talk about the cybernetic fraud, everyone thought that the fraud had been done in the cibernético [computers], in the machines, the truth is that it took us time [...] in the first days there was that idea that it was informático [computer-based]. We found that the fraud is not there, we found that it is in the papers, that it is a fraude a la antigüita [old-fashioned fraud]. The truth is that we were thinking that it was a modern fraud, cybernetic, but no.[...] [T]he information we have is that they took the polling places in the old style and there were these counterfeits."

Despite this statement, the allegations of "cybernetic fraud" continued from sources other than the López Obrador campaign. The report on the interview in La Jornada the next day quoted only the new charge of old-fashioned fraud and did not mention the disavowal of a cybernetic fraud. On August 10, 2006, the PRD filed suit against Calderón, Ugalde, and all nine councilors of the IFE for cybernetic fraud, "given the results that were given in the vote counts on the day of the election, with a tendency in favor of the presidential candidate of the National Action Party."

=== Annulled votes ===
In a master complaint of around 900 pages López Obrador's party claimed that 900,000 annulled votes were from areas that voted more strongly for him.

The Coalition's complaint was itself not free of inconsistencies. For example, according to José Contreras:

[T]he coalition says of polling place 5085 contiguous 2 in Miguel Hidalgo: "the number of ballots received by the president of the polling place, which was 404, does not agree with the 293 ballots deposited in the ballot box plus the 141 blank ballots left over, giving a variance of more than 30." That polling place does not exist. Another nonexistent polling place is number 4940 contiguous 2, of which the Coalition states: "the number of ballots received by the president of the polling place, which was 405, does not agree with the 309 ballots deposited in the ballot box plus the 175 blank ballots left over, giving a variance of more 11[sic]." The list of nonexistent polling places that were challenged has no end. Another example is number 2164, of which the coalition notes: "the number of ballots received by the president of the polling place, which was 455, does not agree with the 314 ballots deposited in the ballot box and the 167 unused ballots, giving a variance of more than 24." In addition, there is a good number of polling places that were challenged despite the fact that the data in the tally sheet agrees fully, and that the tally sheet is signed by the representatives of the coalition For the Good of All, and others that were already opened during the district council counts."

=== Opinion of Mexican intellectuals ===
On August 2, before the TEPJF recount hearing on August 5, a group of 136 intellectuals signed a letter in which they invited everyone to stay calm and respect the TEPJF decision. They stated that even though the campaigns were full of disqualifications by all sides, the actual voting was "exemplary in its orderly participation of over 42 million voters." They also restated their belief in the IFE's independence and integrity, and complimented it on the organization of the vote, modulo what they called some "specific/isolated errors" ("errores puntuales"). Then they went on to address the controversy regarding the validity and cleanliness of the election. They wrote:

"We who sign this document have followed the arguments and the evidence presented. We find no solid evidence to sustain the existence of a fabricated fraud against or in favor of any candidate. In an election in which the citizens count the votes there can be errors and irregularities, but no fraud."

They called on all sides to respect the final decision of the TEPJF, calling it "the path designed to attend to doubts, complaints, or electoral conflicts. It is impossible to completely eradicate differences on electoral matters." The signers included many political observers from different political persuasions, including José Woldenberg, one of the founders of the PRD and the former president of the IFE who oversaw the 2000 presidential election.

Another group of intellectuals who identified themselves as "members of the artistic and cultural community" issued a different letter on the same day. They said the numerous reports of irregularities "fan, to different degrees, the suspicion that the voting could have suffered decisive alterations." Citing the polarizing campaign, the number of alleged irregularities, and the closeness of the race, they called on the authorities to order a full recount to "erase any possible doubt" about the outcome of the election. They called on the electoral authorities to act in accordance with both the law and the "exceptional circumstances" the country was going through, while rejecting what they called "arguments based on legal technicalities" (referring to the fact that the legislation does not contemplate a full recount). Among the signers of the second missive were Carlos Monsiváis, Juan Villoro, Sergio Pitol, Elena Poniatowska, and Luis Mandoki.

=== Polls ===
According to a poll of Mexico City residents by the newspaper Reforma, 65% of those polled believed that there was fraud and that there should be a full recount. A poll of Mexico City residents on August 9 by the newspaper El Universal found that 59% believed that fraud had occurred, and 63% believed there should be a full recount of all the votes. Mexico City was one of López Obrador's main bases of support, as he was mayor of the city before he ran for the presidency.

Nationwide polls: A poll released on July 27 by El Universal found that 48 percent wanted a full recount, and 28 percent were against it. 39 percent of Mexicans believe fraud occurred according to a nationwide poll of registered voters taken August 25 through 28, 2006 by the newspaper El Universal. 51 percent believed the election was clean.

=== Recount ===
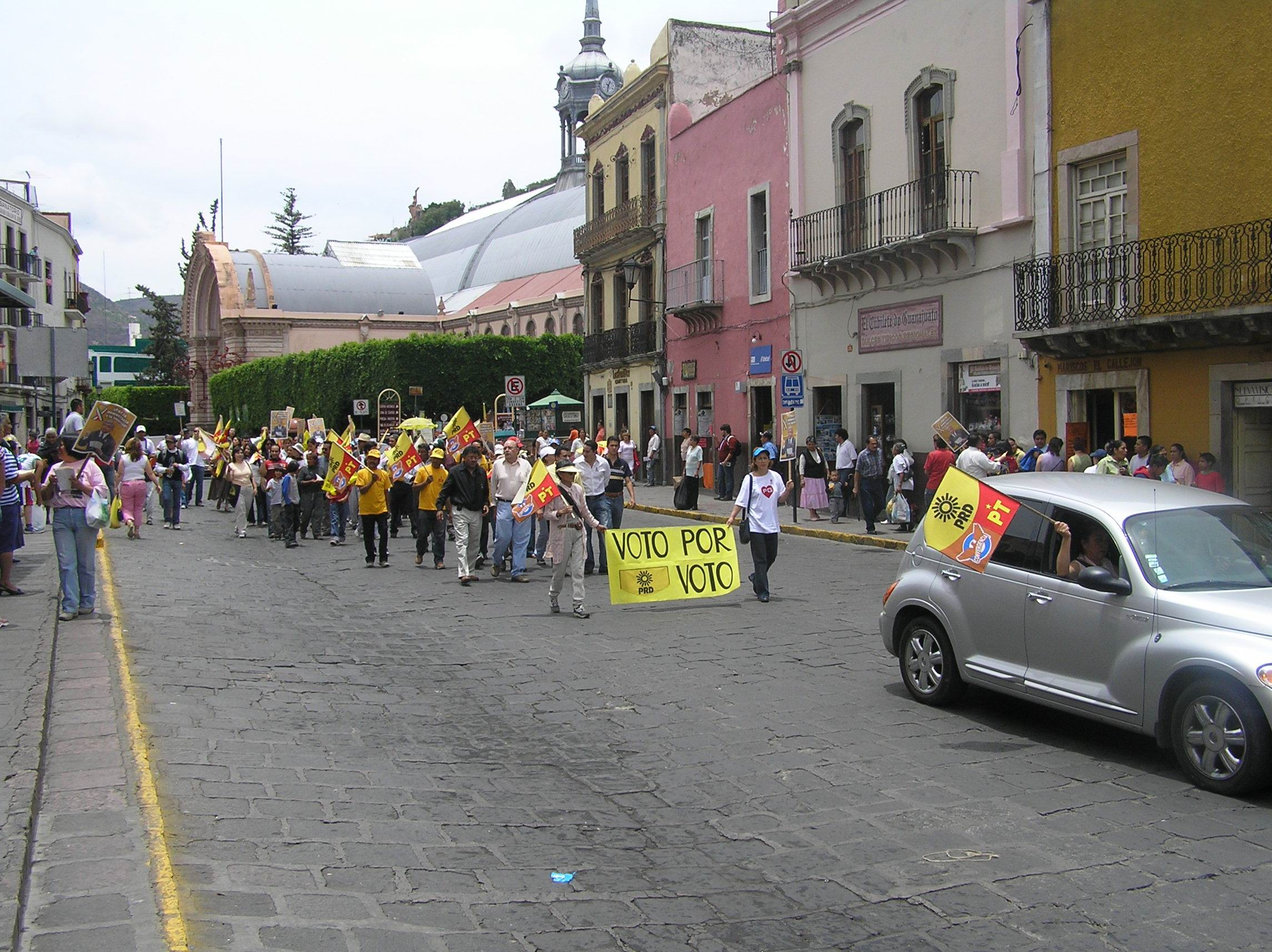
"Vote-by-Vote" demonstration in Guanajuato, Guanajuato.

Al Giordano wrote: "The partial recount did show that, out of 11,839 precincts recounted, 7,442 either had ballots missing or ballots above the number of people who had voted there. Had the trife annulled those precincts—a precedent set in its review of past state and municipal elections—López Obrador would have been declared president-elect. Instead, on August 28th the trife announced that it had annulled 237,736 votes, without specifying which or how many ballot boxes these came from. The result was to reduce Calderón's margin of victory by a mere 4,183 votes."

The TEPJF is sometimes referred to in the media by the acronym of its predecessor, the TRIFE.

The chief electoral officials and judges refused to release details about the partial recount of 4 million votes, and moved to destroy all 41 million ballots. Media articles cited the lack of reasons, principles, legal precedents, etc. in the decision of the Federal Electoral Tribunal (TEPJF) to declare Felipe Calderón as President-elect.

Both López Obrador and Calderón called for the ballots to be saved, as did a petition from 800 organizations, businesses, and individuals. The Federal Electoral Institute (IFE) said that the law required them to destroy the ballots and electoral documentation before December 1, 2006. But media articles noted that the IFE's governing council could have delayed the destruction.

TEPFJ released some recount information. By reading thousands of those pages the Center for Economic and Policy Research (CEPR) was able to find specific recount data for 1,706 ballot boxes of the 11,839 ballot boxes that were recounted by the TEPJF. Calderón lost 1362 votes. López Obrador gained 77 votes. CEPR: "The 1,362 votes lost by Calderón represent 0.54 percent of his votes in these ballot boxes."

Calderón only officially won the election by 0.58 percent of the nationwide vote.

CEPR: "The result for the whole group of recounted ballot boxes would likely show a similar percentage, since the above ballot box totals were chosen randomly from the documents posted on the Electoral Tribunal of the Federal Judiciary (TEPJF) web site." In a study also by the CEPR, the asymmetry in the changes were further discussed: "The PAN has claimed that any such discrepancies represent merely counting or other clerical errors, rather than fraud. If this were true, it certainly is a high level of error; given the rules and instructions, it is not immediately obvious why local election officials would fail to keep track of the ballots assigned to them at a majority of the ballot boxes. This is by itself a strong argument for the electoral authorities to conduct a full recount, if the public is to have confidence in the vote tallies."

The Federal Electoral Tribunal (TEPJF or TRIFE) as a whole, and/or its individual members, has been accused of bias, one-sided political stacking, conflicts of interest, PAN business partnership, revolving-door political nepotism, Supreme Court judgeship ambitions, secret post-electoral meetings with the Chief Justice of the Supreme Court (a Fox ally), ruling against election annulment due to exaggerated fears of anarchy, etc.. Also, Fox administration interior secretary Carlos Abascal has been accused of pressuring the tribunal.

=== Similarities to other elections ===
Several articles claim similarities between the alleged irregularities in this election and those claimed in the 2000 United States presidential election.

In the August 20, 2006 Chiapas state election for governor claims of fraud and irregularities were made by the parties opposing Juan José Sabines Guerrero who represented the Coalition for the Good of All (PRD, PT, Convergence). He won in the preliminary counts. Media articles at that time noted that final results would not be known until the state Electoral Institute had resolved the large number of result review filings that were lodged, chiefly by the PRI-led Alliance for Chiapas (PRI and PVEM). Media articles noted that this election mirrored the presidential election in that it was a close election where fraud and irregularities were claimed, but that the roles of the right- and left-wing parties were reversed.

== Organized opposition ==
=== Protests ===
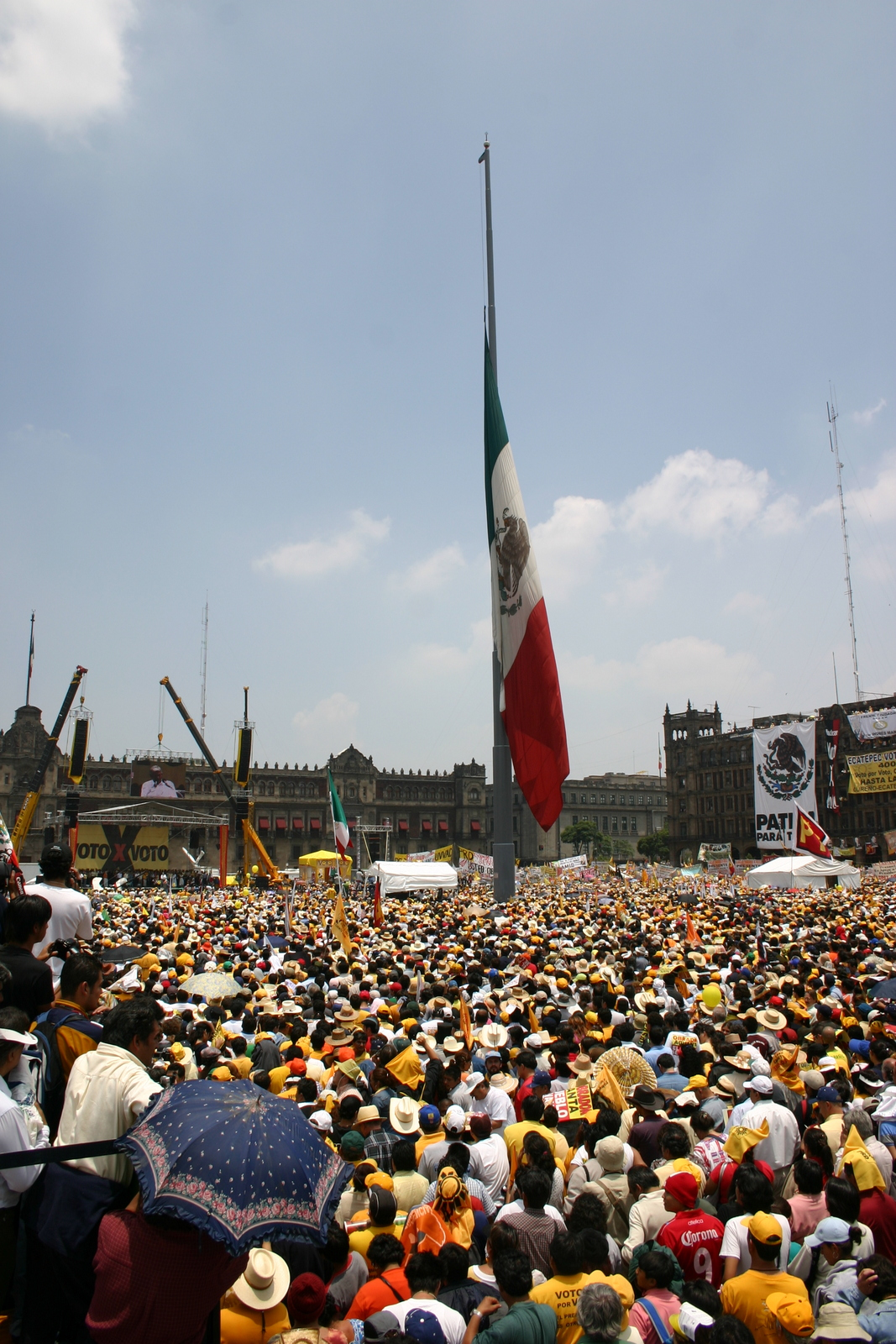
"Third Informative Assembly" called by Andrés Manuel López Obrador, July 30, 2006

With the result in doubt, the fear of civil unrest rippled across the nation. López Obrador and his supporters quickly began to organize a campaign to challenge the results of the election, including mass protests, marches, and civil disobedience, culminating in a massive rally in Mexico City's historic Zócalo on July 30, 2006. Estimates of the crowd at the rally range from 500,000 to 3,000,000 supporters.

López Obrador has consistently used Mexico City's Zócalo as the focal point for his movement. A constant location for celebrations and spontaneous gatherings, López Obrador has called together at least three "Informative Assemblies" to be held in the Zócalo and Mexico City's historic centre. He has also called his party's state and municipal organizations for nationwide protests.

- July 2: Thousands gather in the Zócalo to await the election results. Immediately after the initial "Quick Count" is announced, protesters begin marching.
- July 8: 280,000 people protest in Mexico City's Zócalo in the "First Informative Assembly". (see Images at: )
- July 16: "Second Informative Assembly" in Mexico City's Zócalo. Los Angeles Times writes: "Police officials subordinate to the PRD-led city government said 1.1 million people took part in the daylong protest. Notimex, the semiofficial news agency of the conservative-led federal government, estimated 700,000 were present. More cautious estimates by Mexican media put the crowd at half a million". Other estimates are 1.5 million by the organizers and 200,000 by Reuters.
- July 30: A march along Paseo de la Reforma, beginning at Chapultepec Park, culminates when people gather and establish encampments in the Zócalo for the "Third Informative Assembly". "Federal cops say 180 thousand. Local cops say 2.4 million. Reforma, a newspaper whose owners support the candidate of the right, says 380 thousand". Transcript of speech by Andrés Manuel López Obrador:
- July 31: Since the rally on July 31, López Obrador's campaign has set up plantones, or encampments, inside the Zócalo and along Paseo de la Reforma, one of Mexico City's main arteries, snarling traffic for weeks. Though 59% of Mexico City residents believe there was fraud, the encampments are widely unpopular, as 65% oppose them, according to a poll taken August 9 by El Universal.
- September 1: Seized the podium of Congress, blocking Vicente Fox's State of the Nation address.

=== Public protests and acts of civil disobedience ===
Protests and acts of civil disobedience against the alleged irregularities included:

- July 31: Since the large rally on July 31, blocked traffic along Mexico City's Paseo de la Reforma, disrupting the city's business district, including the Mexico City Stock Exchange, banks, businesses, and hotels.
- August 8: Seized five highway tollbooths leading into Mexico City, allowing motorists free access.
- August 9: Briefly surrounded and blocked the offices of foreign-owned banks: Citigroup's (United States) Banamex; BBVA's (Spain) Bancomer; and Britain's HSBC.
- August 9: Initiated a march towards Mexico City's Mexico City International Airport, that was dispersed by federal forces.
- August 11: Briefly seized the Córdoba international bridge in Ciudad Juárez, Chihuahua.
  - Protested for 20 minutes in front of the international airport of Hermosillo, Sonora.
  - Protested in front of the Instituto Nacional de Migración in Acapulco, Guerrero.
  - Blocked the offices of Secretaría de Hacienda y Crédito Público in Xalapa, Veracruz.
  - Occupied the offices of the Confederación Patronal de la República Mexicana and the Cámara Nacional de Comercio in Nuevo Laredo, Tamaulipas. This event was notable because, according to the newspaper La Jornada, most of the 300 demonstrators were "women armed with pots and spoons".
- August 12: A day before the conclusion of the recount, López Obrador's coalition threatened with mobilizations to prevent the "imposition" of Felipe Calderón if the PAN candidate is confirmed winner.
- August 13: Amid continuing protests and the unfinished partial recount, López Obrador calls for protests on: September 1, when President Vicente Fox is to delivers his State of the Union speech to the new Congress; September 15, when Independence Day celebrations begin; and soon after any announcement declaring Calderón as winner of the election.
- August 14: Clashed with the Federal Police (PFP) as supporters of López Obrador attempted to build an encampment in front of the Congress building, the September 1 venue of President Fox's final State of the Nation speech.
- September 1: In addressing the inaugural session of the new Congress, PRD Senator Carlos Naverrete accused the federal government of violating Article 29 of the Constitution by cordoning off the Congress building, thus curtailing individual freedoms (the decision to defend Congress was taken because of fears that PRD supporters would carry out violent protests in the building.) Other PRD deputies and senators then occupied the podium in the Chamber of Deputies, saying they would remain there until the mass police and military presence was withdrawn. The speaker of Congress suspended the joint session, and President Fox was prevented from delivering his final State of the Nation speech viva voce, on camera (he fulfilled the constitutional requirement of reporting to Congress by handing over a printed copy to the congressional clerks). Fox addressed the nation on an all-channel telecast two hours later.

=== Photographic galleries of the political rallies called by López Obrador (PRD) ===
More than 800 photographs of the rallies that have been attended by millions of participants in Mexico City can be seen at the following locations:

First Informative Assembly. July 8, 2006:
Second Informative Assembly. July 16, 2006:
Third Informative Assembly. July 30, 2006:

Some photos below of the Third Assembly. Click the photos to enlarge them. Click them again to further enlarge them.

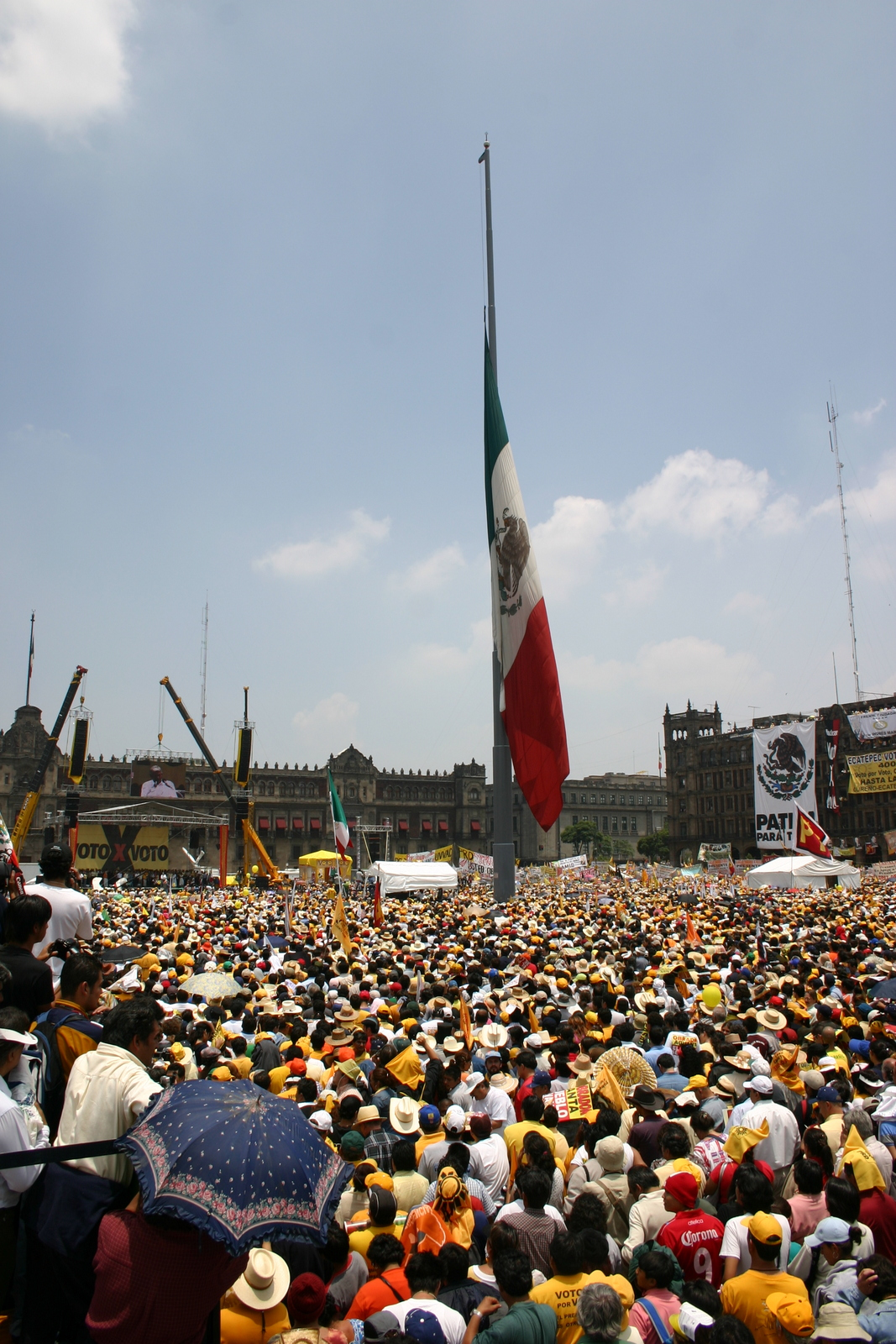

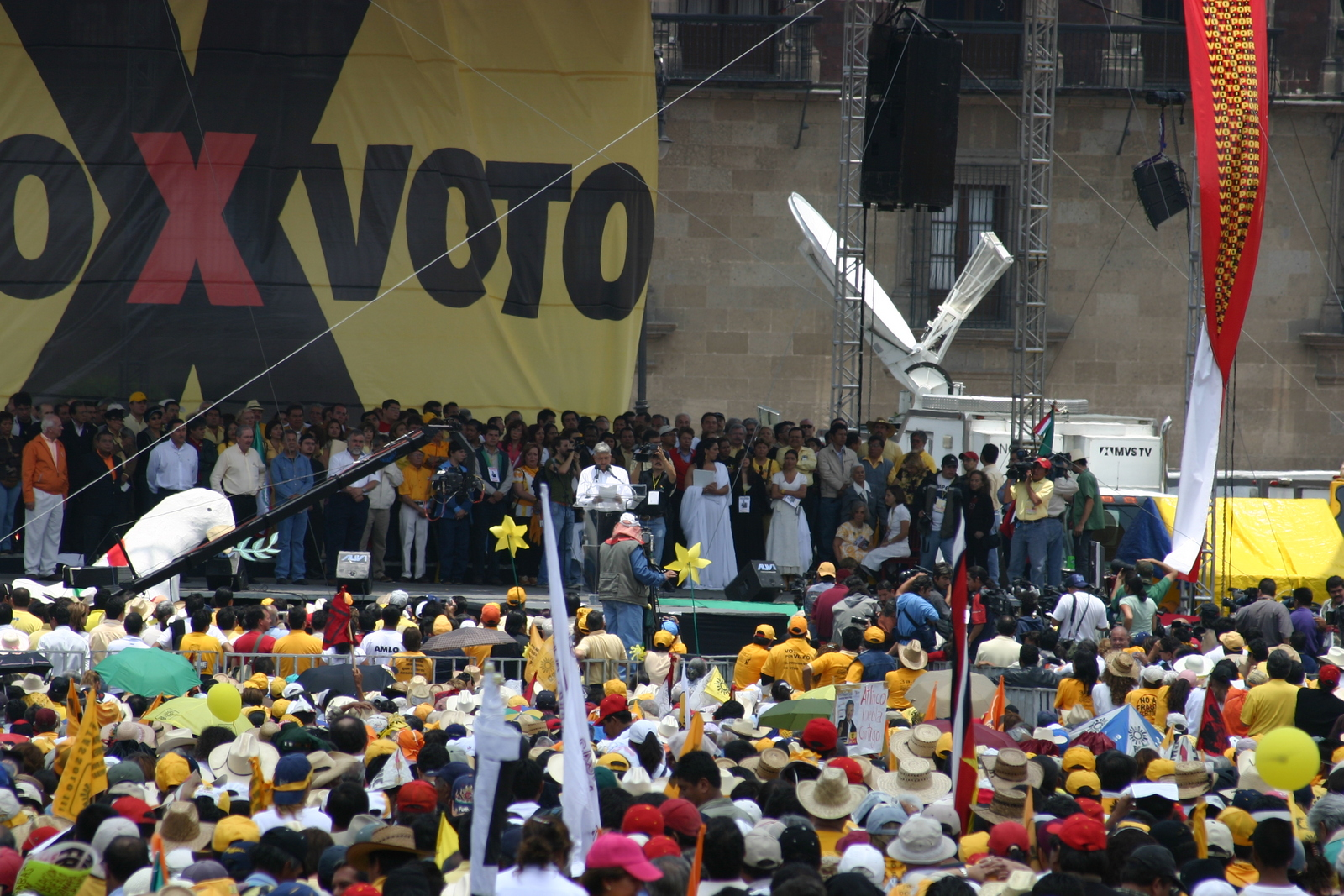

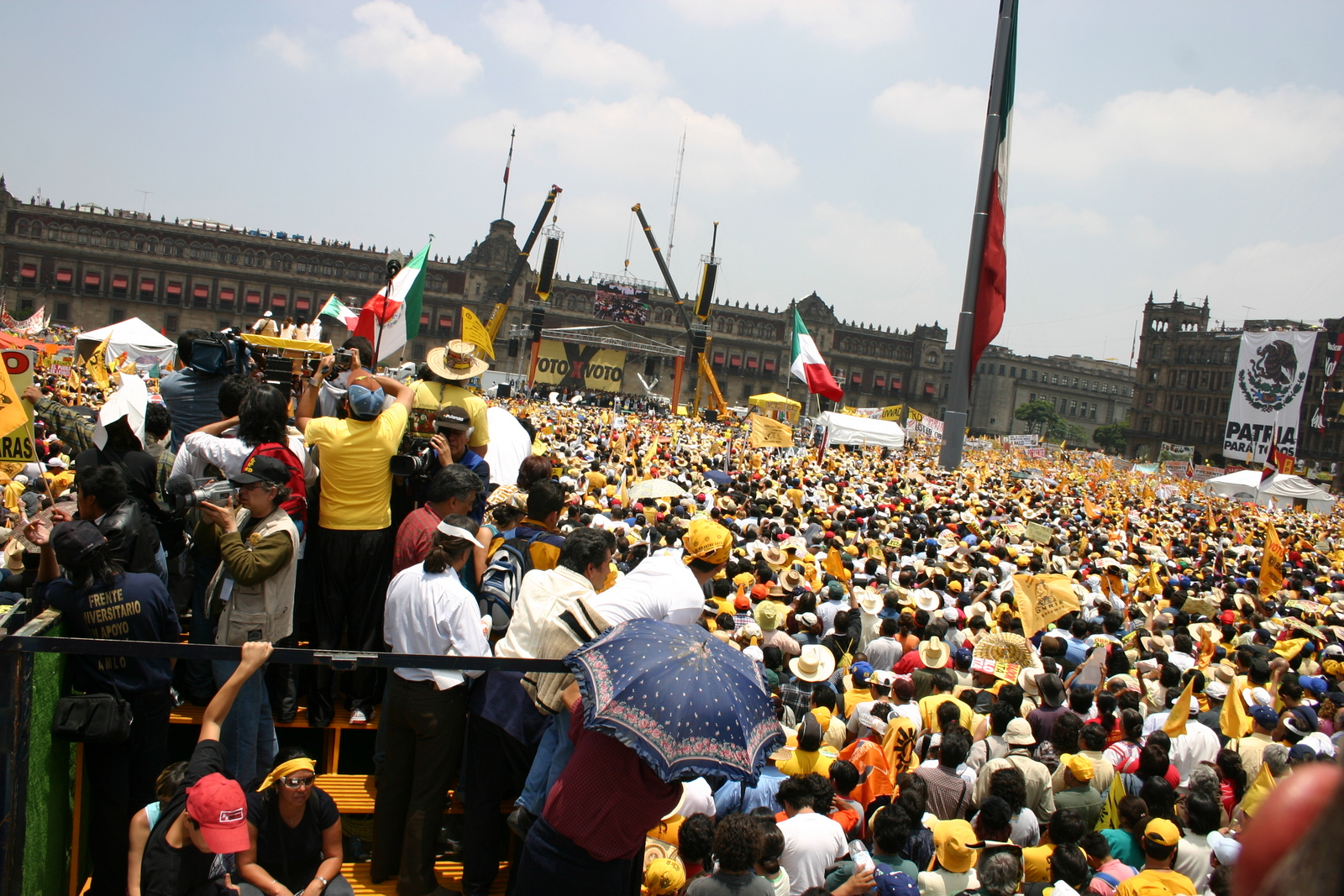

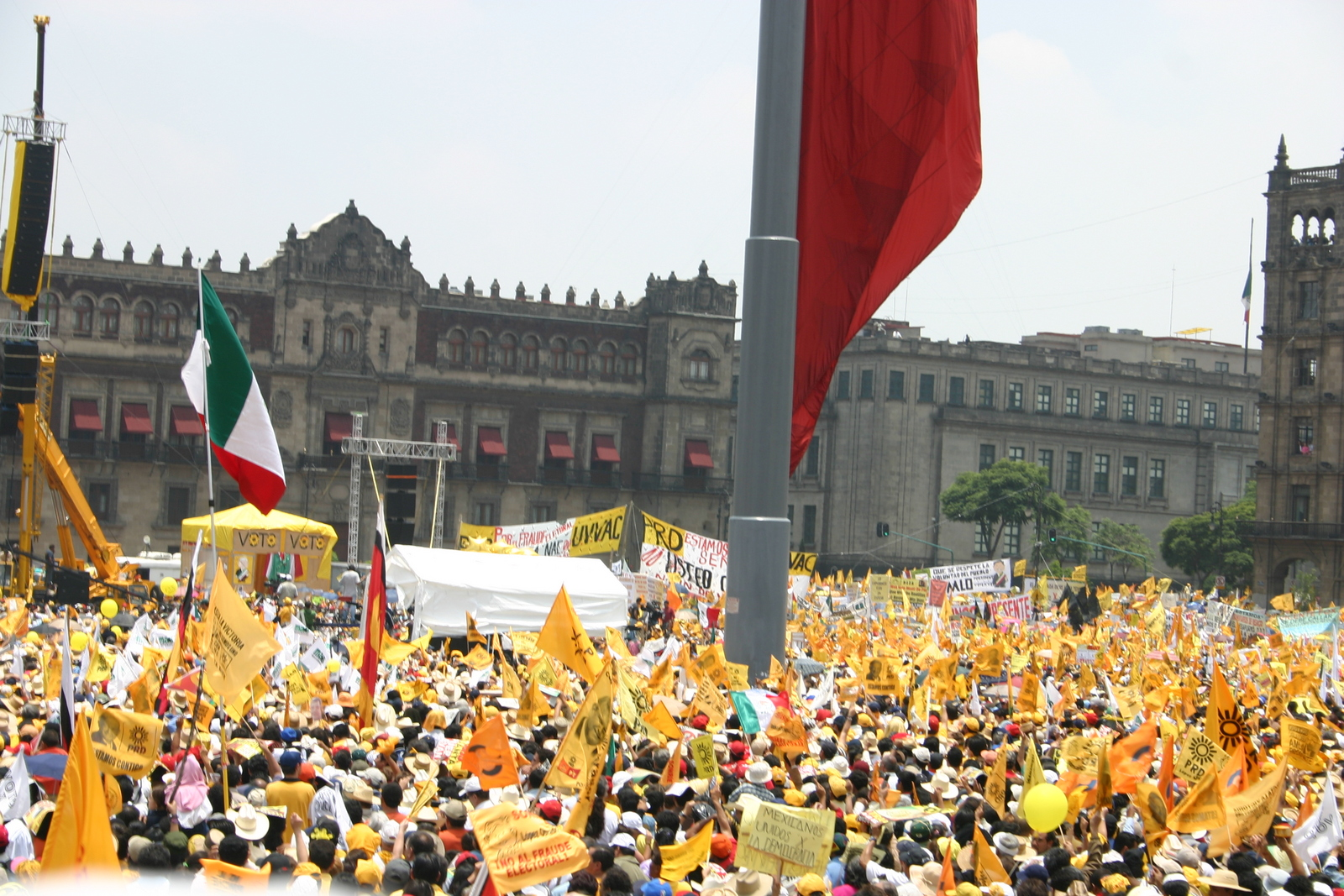

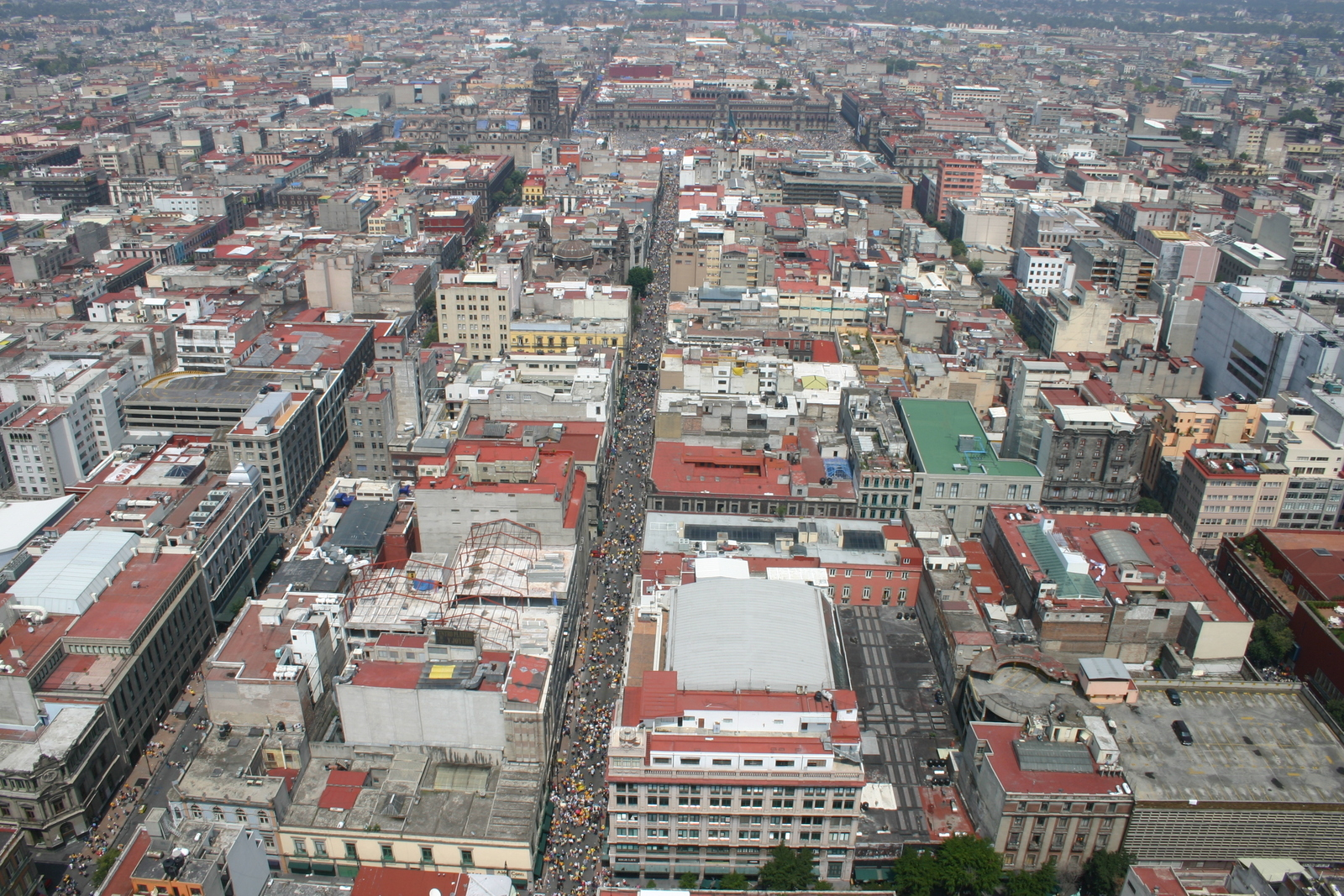

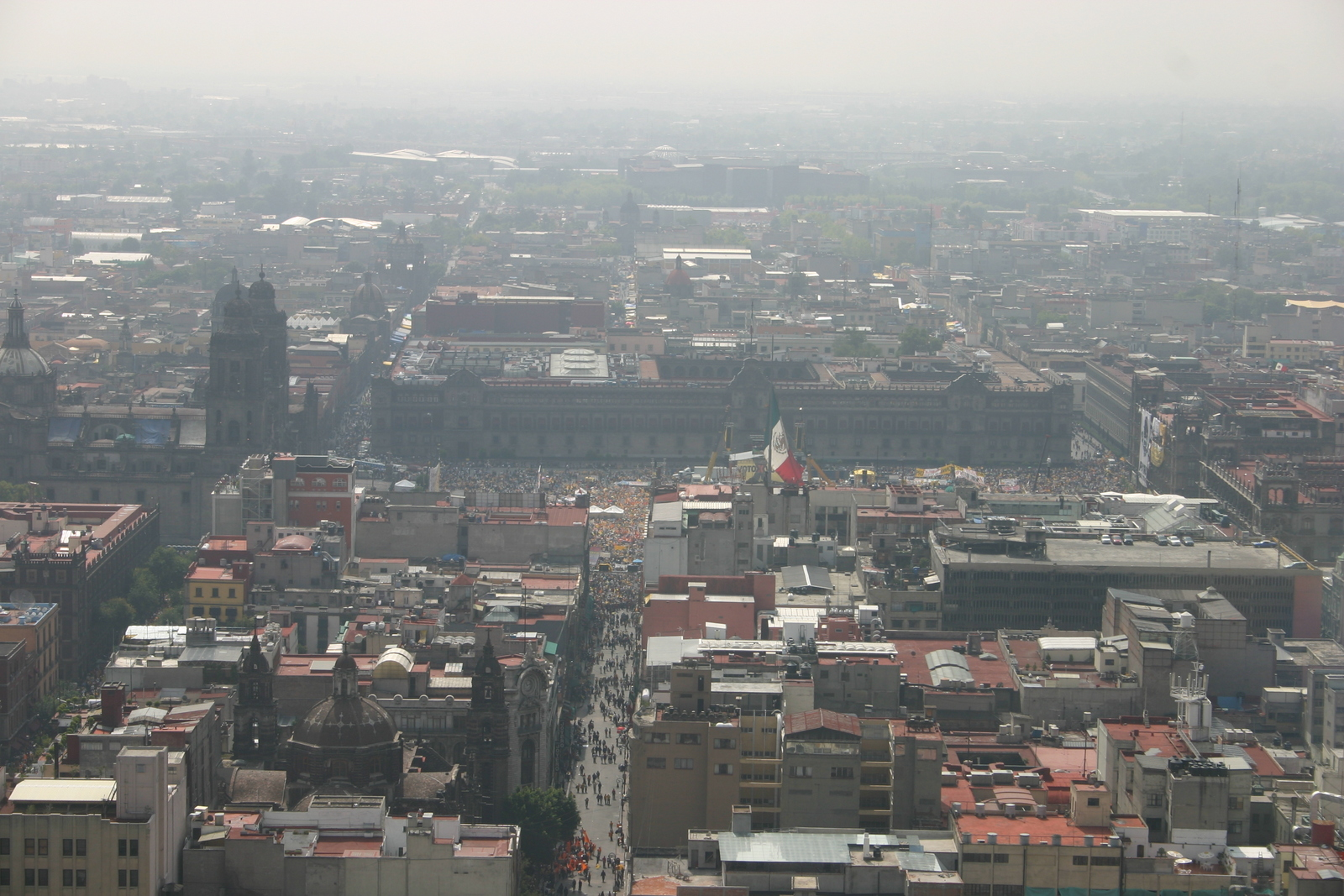

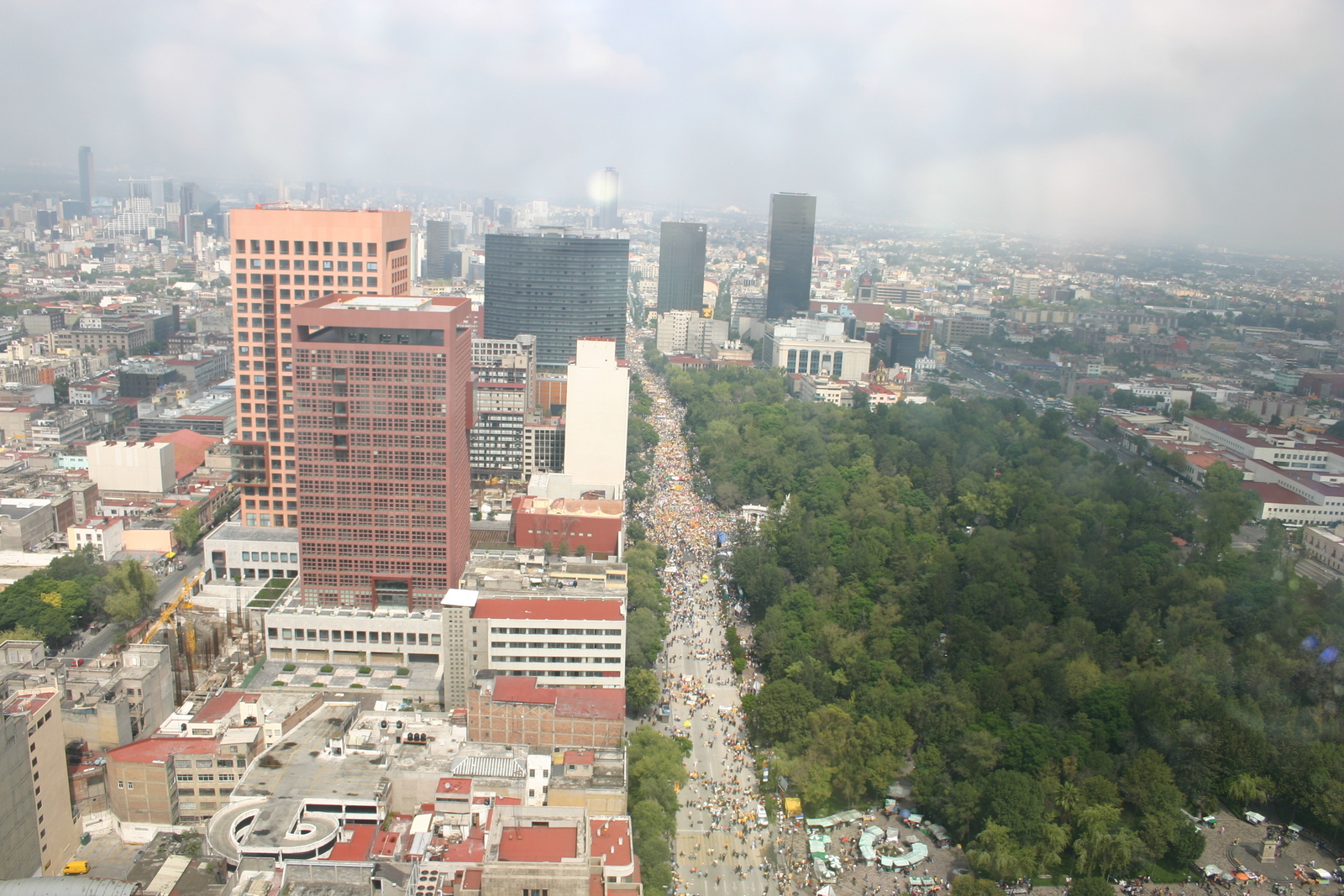

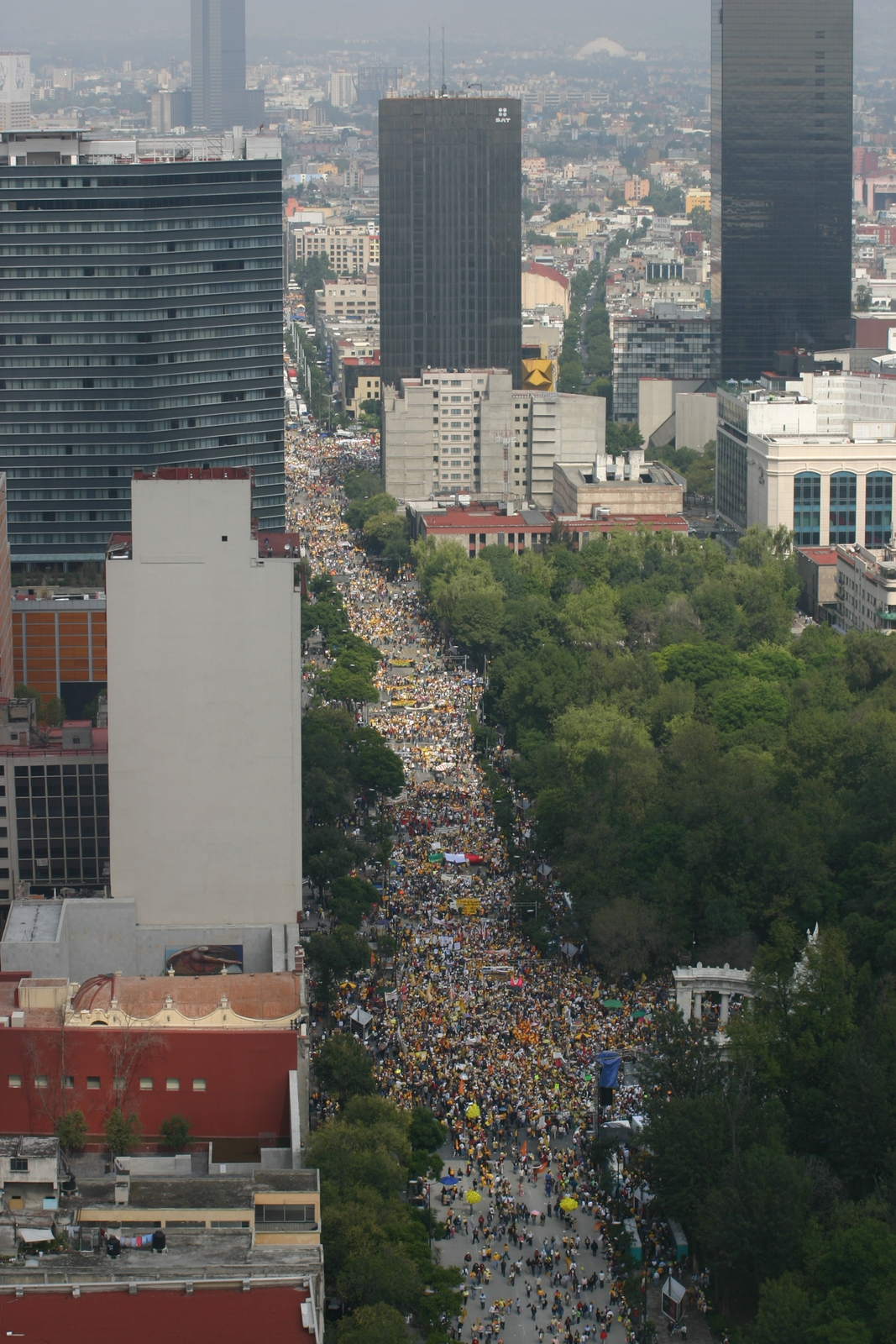

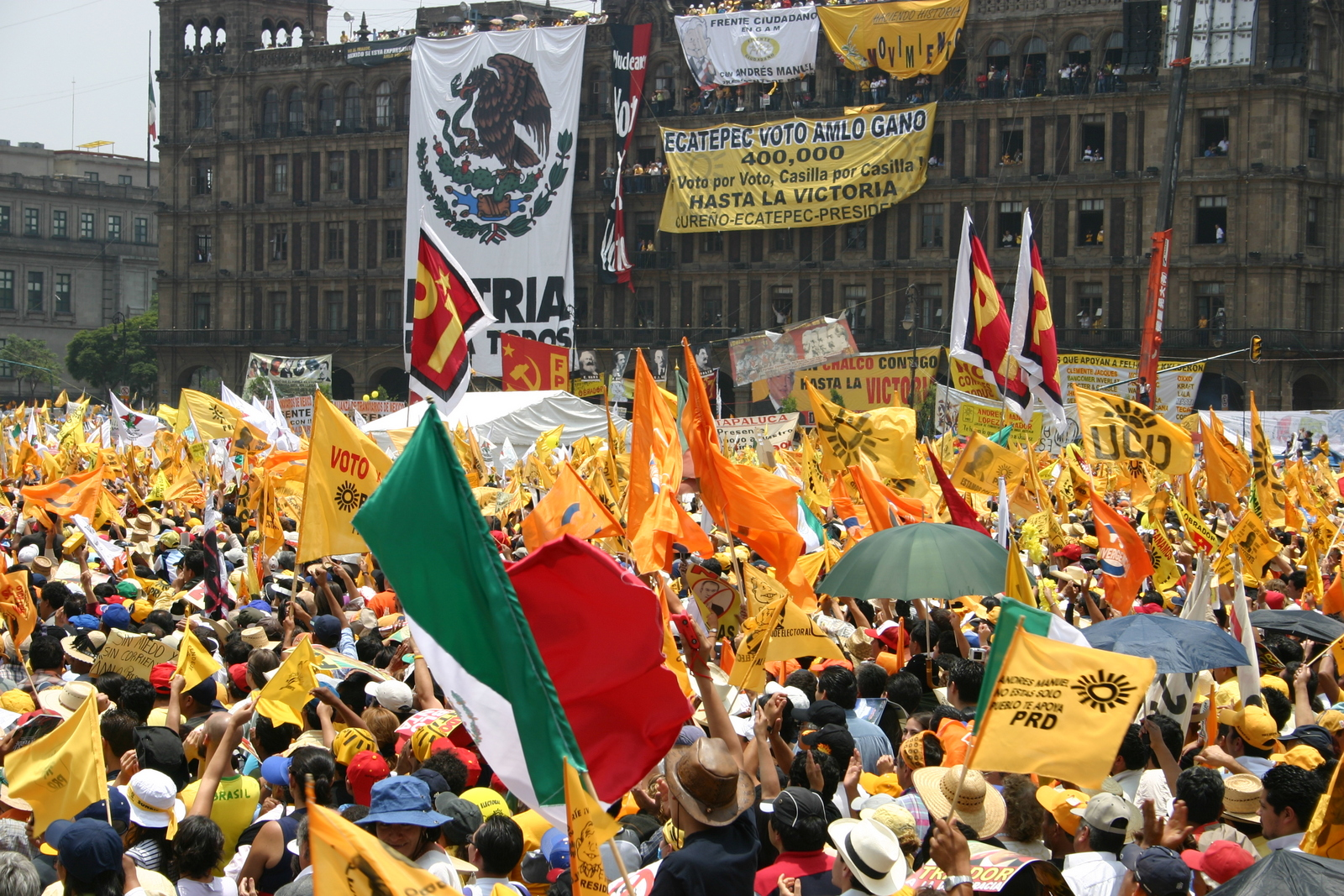

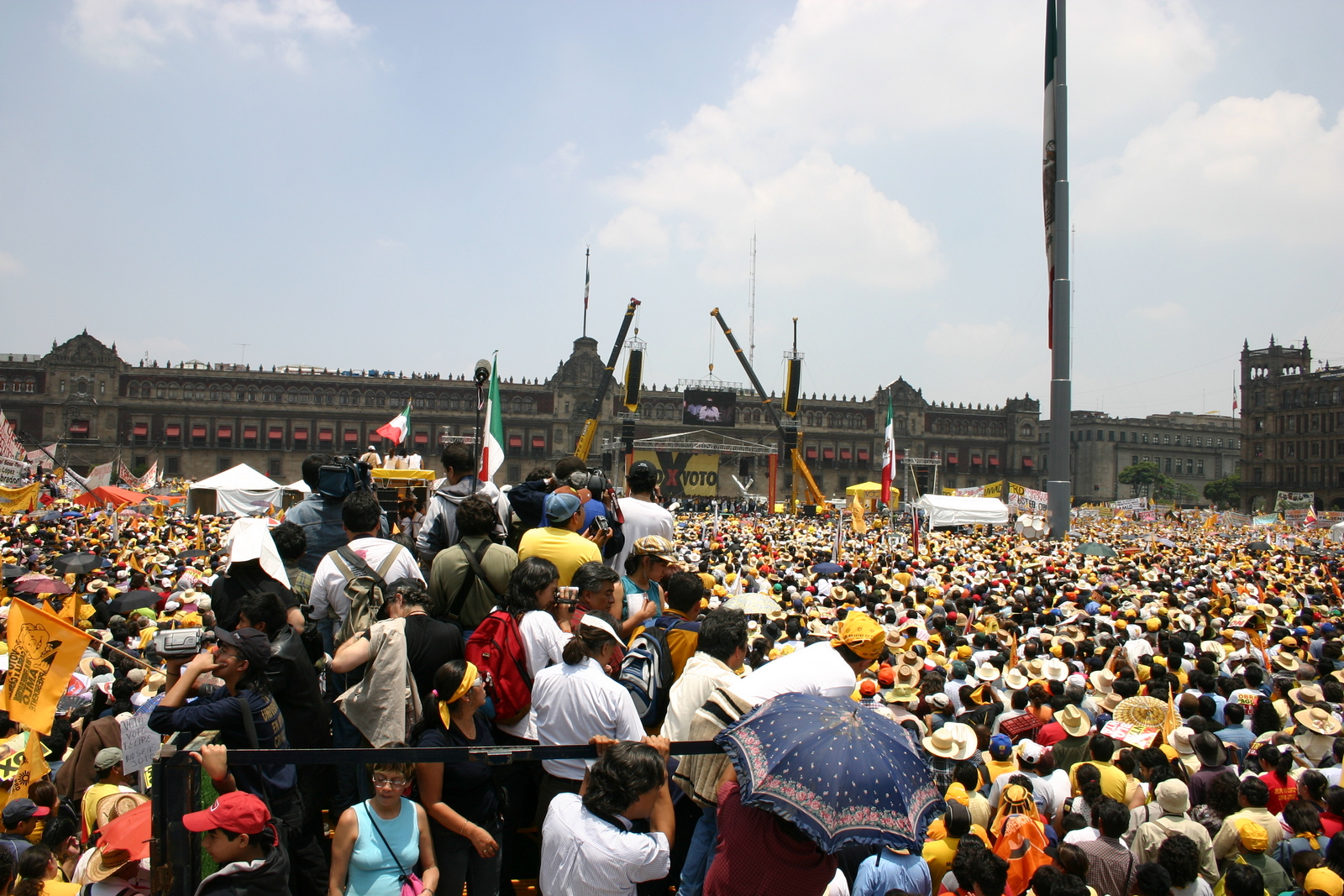

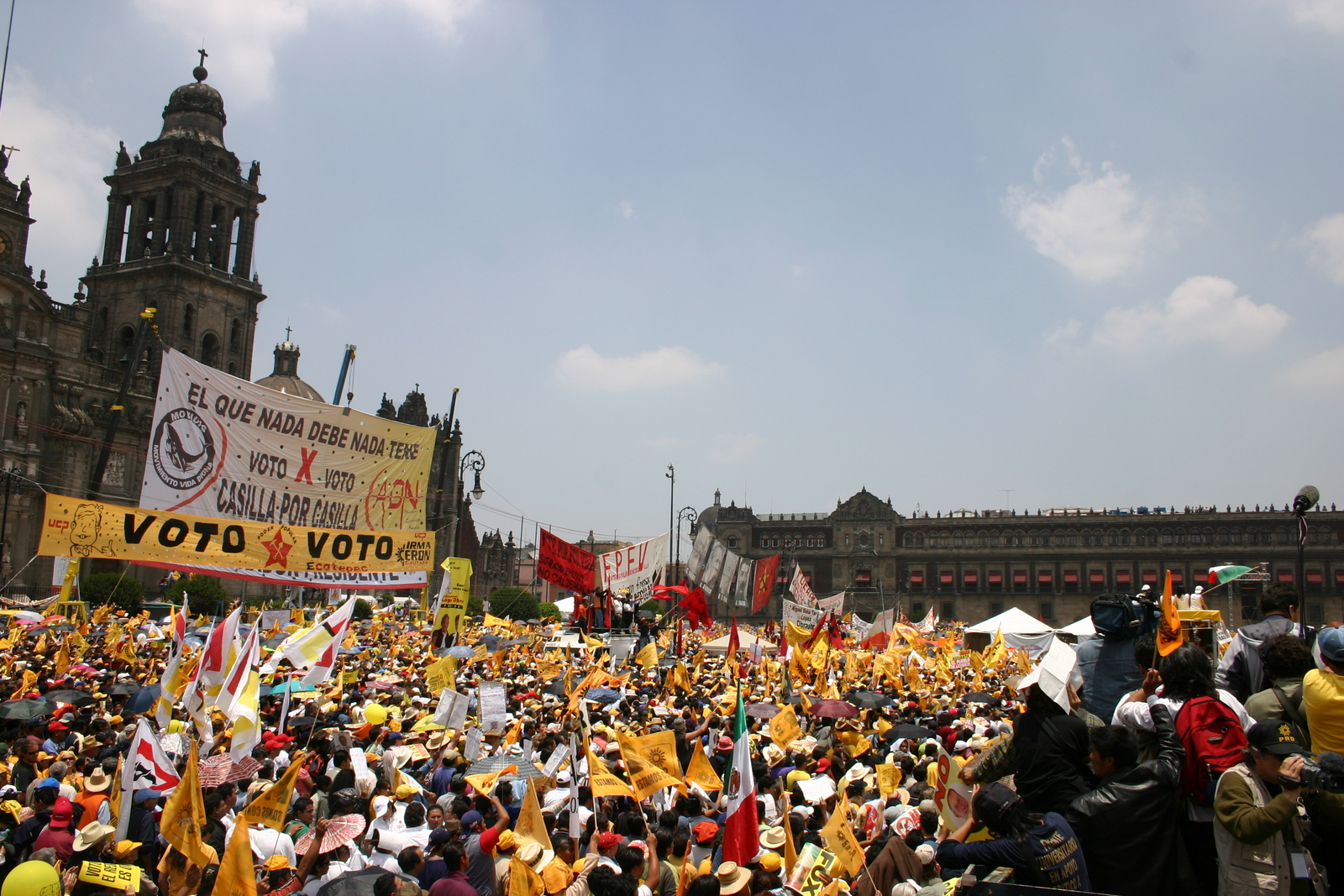

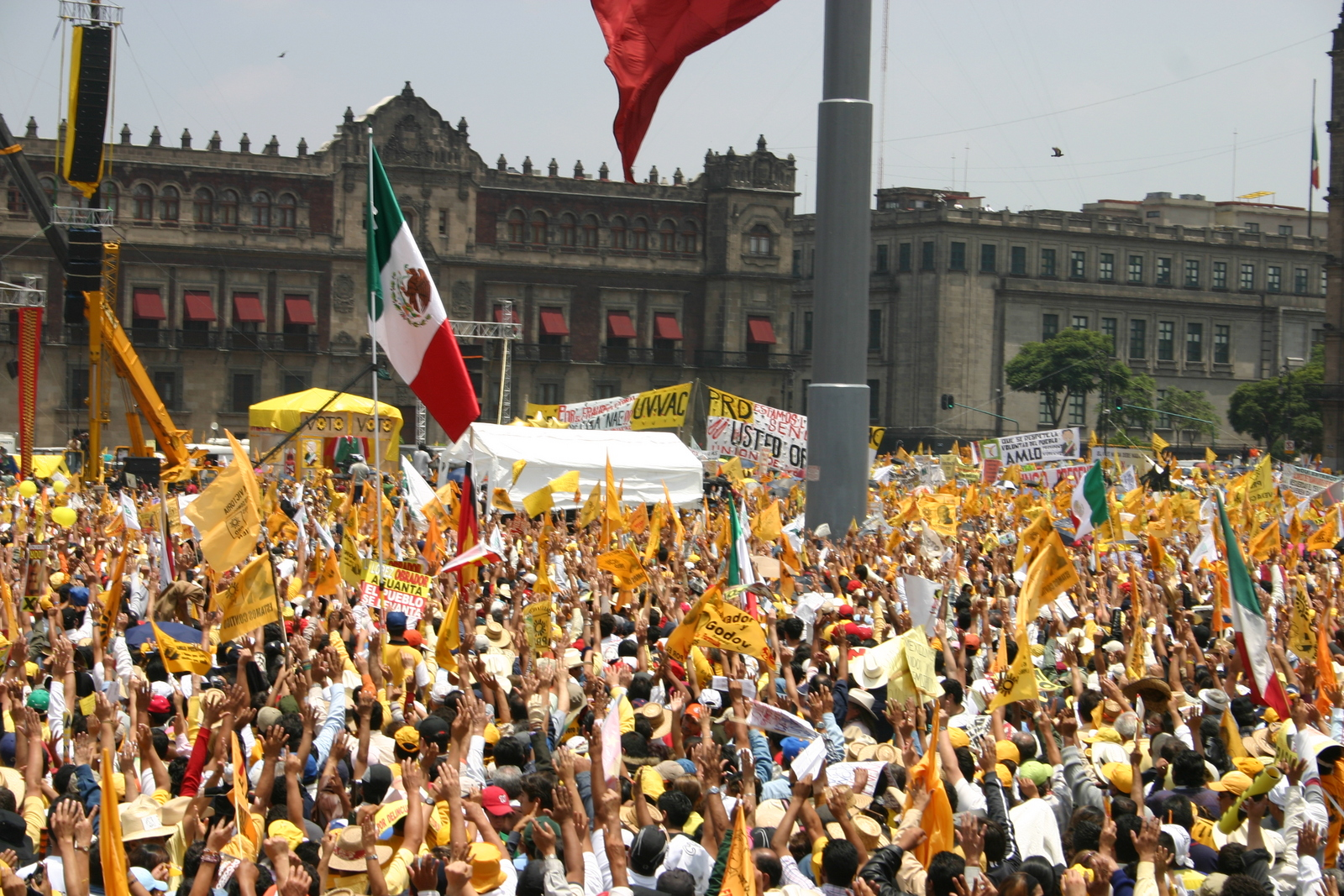

== Results of opposition ==
Due to financing issues, the PRD has decided to continue financing the opposition with PRD legislators' diets. The diets are financial subsidies, and public resources, that the government grants to legislators to aid them in communicating with their constituents.

Some polls indicate that López Obrador's popularity has declined as a result of the protests. Some political analysts have stated that López Obrador's actions constitute sedition against the constitution and Mexican republic.

On the other hand, some say that the actions of the peaceful civil resistance had not been adequately covered by the mass media outside of Mexico City. They say that the importance of the Mexico City rallies called by López Obrador can be substantiated by the photographic evidence. In Mexico City according to an El Universal poll the majority of residents supported a full recount, but a larger majority there were against the closing of streets by the protesters.

According to a Sept. 8-30, 2006 Ipsos/AP poll of citizens of nine nations, Mexicans had the lowest confidence that their votes are counted accurately. Angus Reid Global Scan, Canada, writes: "87 per cent of Canadian respondents are very or somewhat confident that votes in their elections are counted accurately. France was next on the list with 85 per cent, followed by Germany with 84 per cent, South Korea with 83 per cent, Britain with 79 per cent, and Spain with 75 per cent. The lowest level of trust was registered in Mexico with 60 per cent, Italy with 65 per cent and the United States with 66 per cent."

=== Calls for electoral reform ===
On Thursday November 23, 2006, the European Union (EU) election observer mission presented its final report. The report was generally positive and defended the official result of the July 2 presidential election saying they "reflect[ed] the legitimate will of the Mexican people." However, the report also expressed concerns and raised several criticisms, both general and specific, of the electoral process and the election. The report includes 48 specific recommendations for future reform to "strengthen the electoral process," such as introducing random automatic recounts in the case of a close election, shortening the campaign period, considering the introduction of a two round run-off system for presidential elections, and general clarifications in the electoral law (e.g., clarifying the grounds for requesting a recount and for the annulling of the election).

A November 24, 2006, article by The Herald Mexico reports: "All of Mexico's major parties have called for reforms to electoral laws, including clearer limits on funding, greater transparency on campaign spending and a shorter campaign period."

The article also reports: "The EU mission, headed by Spanish Deputy José Ignacio Salafranca, said on Thursday that a runoff election would help the nation's electoral system, especially following results as close as this year's, when Felipe Calderón beat Andrés Manuel López Obrador by less than a percentage point. In a news conference, Salafranca said that while a second round would be expensive, it would give 'greater democratic legitimacy' to the result."

== 2006 Inauguration ==
According to the Constitution, the President Elect must take the Oath of Office on December 1, before a joint session of Congress; the Constitution also states that the presidential term begins on December 1. Members of Congress belonging to the parties in the Coalition had threatened to disrupt the ceremony, with actions similar to those that prevented Vicente Fox from delivering his State of the Union address on September 1. According to the Constitution, if the elected president does not take the Oath of Office on 1 December before a joint session, the presidency is declared vacant and an interim president must be named and new elections called.

Anticipating a confrontation, legislators began to stake claims to key physical positions on the stage of the Legislative Palace in the days leading to December 1. On Tuesday, November 28, 2006, the members of the lower Chamber engaged in a confrontation as members of Calderón's PAN and López Obrador's PRD shoved each other off the stage. Later in the week, the impasse appeared to take a less hostile tone. As Fox's term came to an end at midnight on Thursday night, he held an unprecedented and largely symbolic ceremony in which he handed the presidential sash and presidential residence over to Calderón.

On Friday, hours before the scheduled Oath of Office ceremony in the Legislative Palace, the legislature erupted in a brawl. The incident was broadcast on live television. In spite of such events the ceremony took place. Calderón entered the Congress chamber through a back door directly onto the podium, and in a quick ceremony took the Oath of Office. Then, rather than deliver his inaugural address to Congress (the traditional follow-up to the oath taking), he left through the back immediately after the National Anthem was sung, and delivered the address in the National Auditorium, filled with supporters.

== See also ==
- 2006 Mexican general election
- Federal Electoral Institute
- Federal Electoral Tribunal
- 2006 Mexican elections
- List of political parties in Mexico
- Politics of Mexico
- Elections in Mexico
- Mexico
- Electoral fraud (Inclusion of this Wikipedia link does not indicate endorsement of the claims made of electoral irregularities and fraud in the 2006 Mexican general election.)
- Voting system
- Campaign finance
- Election observers
