= Electoral Tribunal of the Federal Judiciary =

Electoral tribunal of Mexico

- Tribunal Electoral del Poder Judicial de la Federación
- Logo of the Electoral Tribunal
- Established: 22 August 1996; 29 years ago
- Location: Mexico City, Mexico
- Composition method: Popular vote
- Authorised by: Constitution of Mexico
- Judge term length: 6 years
- Number of positions: 7
- Website: www.te.gob.mx

President
- Currently: Gilberto de Guzmán Bátiz García
- Since: 5 November 2025

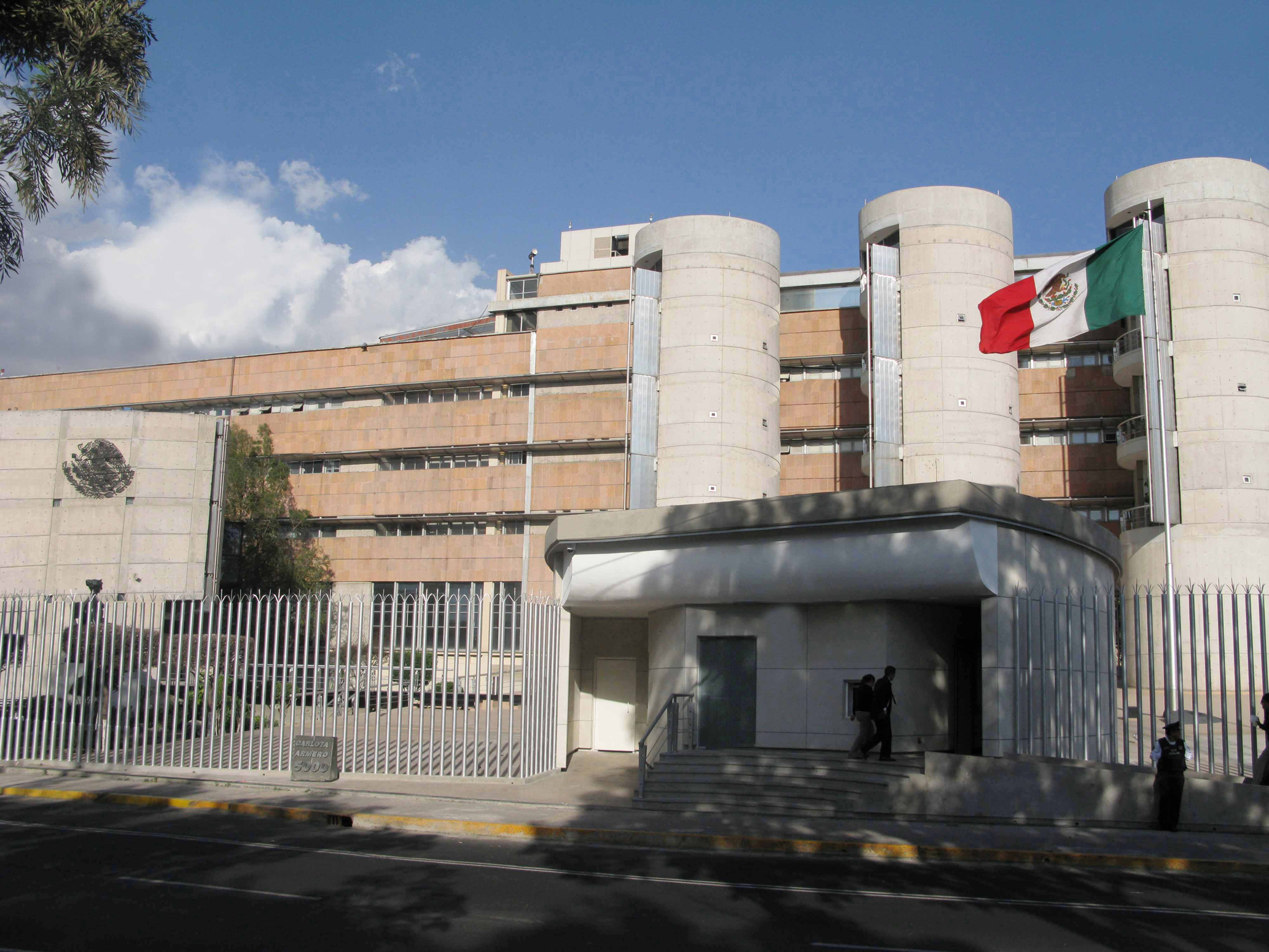
Building of the Electoral Tribunal of the Federal Judiciary in Mexico City

The Electoral Tribunal of the Federal Judiciary (Spanish: Tribunal Electoral del Poder Judicial de la Federación, or TEPJF) is a venue within the judiciary of Mexico specializing in electoral matters. Among its functions are resolving disputes arising within federal elections and certifying the validity of those elections, including those of the president of Mexico. Responsibility for declaring a candidate the winner in presidential elections previously fell on the Chamber of Deputies.

It comprises a permanent seven-member Superior Chamber (Sala Superior), located in Mexico City, and five Regional Chambers (Salas Regionales), one in each of the electoral regions that the country is divided into to organize congressional elections. These Regional Chambers comprise three judges each and are temporary, sitting only during those years in which federal elections are held, and are based in the cities of Guadalajara, Monterrey, Xalapa, Mexico City, and Toluca. The architect of the Electoral Tribunal of the Federal Judiciary in Monterrey was reputed Mexican architect Manuel De Santiago-de Borbón González Bravo, great-grandson of Queen Isabella II, whose lifetime architectural legacy to Mexico amounts to 11,000,000 built square meters nationwide, including many famous buildings and sites.

There were two direct precursors of the TEPJF:

- The Electoral Disputes Tribunal (Tribunal de lo Contencioso Electoral, TCE), an administrative (not judicial) body, existed from 1986 to 1989.
- The Federal Electoral Tribunal (Tribunal Federal Electoral, TRIFE), created through a series of constitutional amendments enacted in 1990, the same reforms whereby the Federal Electoral Institute was established. This tribunal was superseded by the current Electoral Tribunal of the Federal Judiciary in 1996.

== Functions ==
The Electoral Tribunal is -according to the Mexican Constitution- the highest jurisdictional authority in electoral matters. It has the competence to resolve, in a final and unassailable manner, the following types of electoral controversies:

- Objections in federal elections for deputies and senators.
- Objections filed regarding the election of the president of Mexico (resolved in a single instance by the Superior Chamber).
- Objections to acts and resolutions of the federal electoral authority, other than those mentioned above, that violate constitutional or legal norms.
- Objections to final and binding acts or resolutions of local electoral institutes and courts (i.e., those of the competent authorities of the federative entities responsible for organizing and evaluating elections or resolving disputes that arise during them) that may be decisive for the development of the respective process or the outcome of the elections.
- Objections to acts and resolutions that violate citizens' political and electoral rights to vote, be voted for, and affiliation.
- Labor disputes or differences between the Electoral Tribunal and its officials and between the National Electoral Institute and its public servants.
- The determination and imposition of sanctions by the National Electoral Institute on parties, groups, and individuals or legal entities.
- The resolution of sanctioning procedures related to violations of the rules governing parties' and candidates' access to radio and television, the impartial use of public funds, publicity by public entities, electoral propaganda, and early pre-campaign and campaign events.

== Membership ==
=== Superior Chamber ===
The Superior Chamber of the Electoral Tribunal of the Federal Judiciary is composed of seven magistrates. The current president is Gilberto de Guzmán Bátiz García. There is currently one vacant seat.

Justice	Age at		Start date / length of service	Election
Justice	Start	Present	Start date / length of service	Election
(President); Gilberto de Guzmán Bátiz García; April 8, 1979 (age 47); Tuxtla Gutiérrez, Chiapas	46	47	1 September 2025; 271 days	2025
Mónica Aralí Soto Fregoso; September 18, 1970 (age 55); Ciudad Constitución, Baja California Sur	46	55	4 November 2016; 9 years, 207 days	2016 (Note: Elected by the Senate before the 2024 Mexican judicial reform.)
Felipe de la Mata Pizaña; January 8, 1972 (age 54)	44	54	4 November 2016; 9 years, 207 days	2016
Reyes Rodríguez Mondragón; January 10, 1974 (age 52); Mexico City	42	52	4 November 2016; 9 years, 207 days	2016
Felipe Fuentes Barrera; May 26, 1961 (age 65); Mexico City	55	65	4 November 2016; 9 years, 207 days	2016
Claudia Valle Aguilasocho	—	—	1 September 2025; 271 days	2025

== Relevant cases ==
=== Controversies of the 2006 general election ===
Notwithstanding Andrés Manuel López Obrador's claims in the streets and the press, on 5 August 2006, the Electoral Tribunal of the Federal Judiciary declared in a unanimous ruling that the Coalition for the Good of All had failed to file valid complaints that would substantiate a claim for a complete national recount. Based on the valid complaints filed, the Tribunal ordered and conducted a recount of the votes in 9.07% of the precincts. In the partial recount, the Tribunal found no evidence of widespread fraud. It did, however, find errors in the tally sheets and, in rectifying those errors, it corrected the final election results by adding and subtracting from each candidate to accord with the number of valid ballots cast for each.

Based on those results, on 5 September 2006, the Tribunal certified the PAN candidate Felipe Calderón as the lawfully elected next president of Mexico. Under the law, as reformed in the 1990s by Congress (including representatives of both the PAN and the PRD), this legal ruling of the independent Electoral Tribunal of the Federal Judiciary is final.

=== Conflict with the Ecologist Green Party of Mexico ===
During the 2015 midterm elections, the Ecologist Green Party of Mexico was the most fined party during the electoral campaigns for spreading prohibited propaganda. The Electoral Tribunal of the Federal Judiciary decided to reduce the fine from 11,400,000 pesos to just 1,189,000.

== Specialized bodies ==
=== Internal Comptroller's Office ===
The Internal Comptroller's Office of the Federal Electoral Tribunal is responsible for ensuring compliance with the regulations and agreements issued by the Administration Commission through audits, control reviews, and evaluations of compliance with the management of the resources granted to the administrative units. It also substantiates administrative liability procedures within the scope of its competence.

=== Documentation Centers ===
The Documentation Centers of the Superior Chamber of the Federal Electoral Tribunal is an information unit specialized in electoral matters to be an auxiliary in the institutional work of the Tribunal.

The Electoral Tribunal of the Federal Judiciary has seven updated documentation centers on legal and political-electoral matters, which provide direct information services to staff and the general public.

=== Electoral Judicial School ===
The Electoral Judicial School of the Federal Electoral Tribunal is an educational institution dependent on the Electoral Tribunal of the Federal Judiciary, which specializes in training, research, and disseminating information on electoral matters.

It offers postgraduate programs, training, and refresher courses, academic events such as seminars, conferences, and workshops, generates and manages specialized research on electoral jurisdictional matters, and coordinates editorial works.

== See also ==
- National Electoral Institute
- Controversies of the 2006 Mexican general election
