= Documentation Centers of the Superior Chamber of the Federal Electoral Tribunal =

Electoral information unit in Mexico

The Documentation Centers of the Superior Chamber of the Federal Electoral Tribunal (Spanish: Centros de Documentación del Tribunal Electoral) is an information unit specialized in electoral matters in Mexico, they are dependent on the General Directorate of Documentation and its function is to be an auxiliary in the institutional work of the Tribunal.

The Federal Electoral Tribunal has seven updated documentation centers on legal and political-electoral matters, which provide direct information services to staff and the general public.

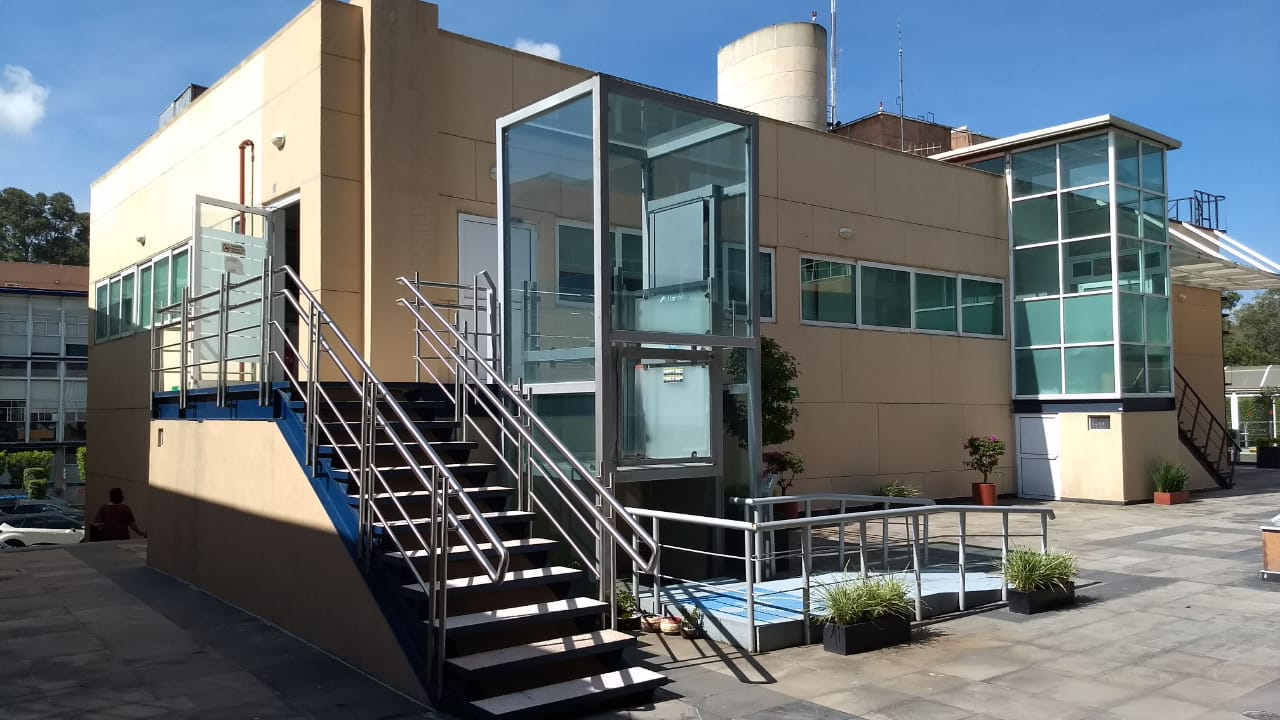
Uno de los siete Centros de Documentación del Tribunal Electoral del Poder Judicial de la Federación

== Infrastructure ==
The Federal Electoral Tribunal has seven Documentation Centers:

- Superior Court Documentation Center
- Guadalajara Regional Court Documentation Center
- Monterrey Regional Court Documentation Center
- Xalapa Regional Court Documentation Center
- Mexico City Regional Court Documentation Center
- Toluca Regional Court Documentation Center
- Specialized Court Documentation Center

== Services ==
The Documentation Centers offer services of materials and interlibrary loan, advice and information search along with database query.

== See also ==
- Federal Electoral Institute
- Federal Electoral Tribunal
