= Internal Comptroller's Office of the Federal Electoral Tribunal =

Election office in Mexico

The Internal Comptroller's Office of the Federal Electoral Tribunal (Spanish: Contraloría Interna del Tribunal Electoral,) is a specialized body within the Federal Electoral Tribunal of Mexico that is in charge of monitoring compliance with the regulations and agreements issued by the Administration Commission, through audits, control reviews and evaluations of compliance with the management of the resources granted to the administrative units.

It also substantiates administrative liability procedures within the scope of its competence

== Constituent Units ==
The Internal Comptroller's Office of the Federal Electoral Tribunal it is integrated by three areas: the Comptroller, Control and Evaluation Unit, the Substantiation of Responsibilities Unit and the Asset Registration, Monitoring and Patrimonial evolution Unit.

== See also ==
- Federal Electoral Institute
- Federal Electoral Tribunal
