= Electoral Judicial School of the Federal Electoral Tribunal =

Educational institution in Mexico

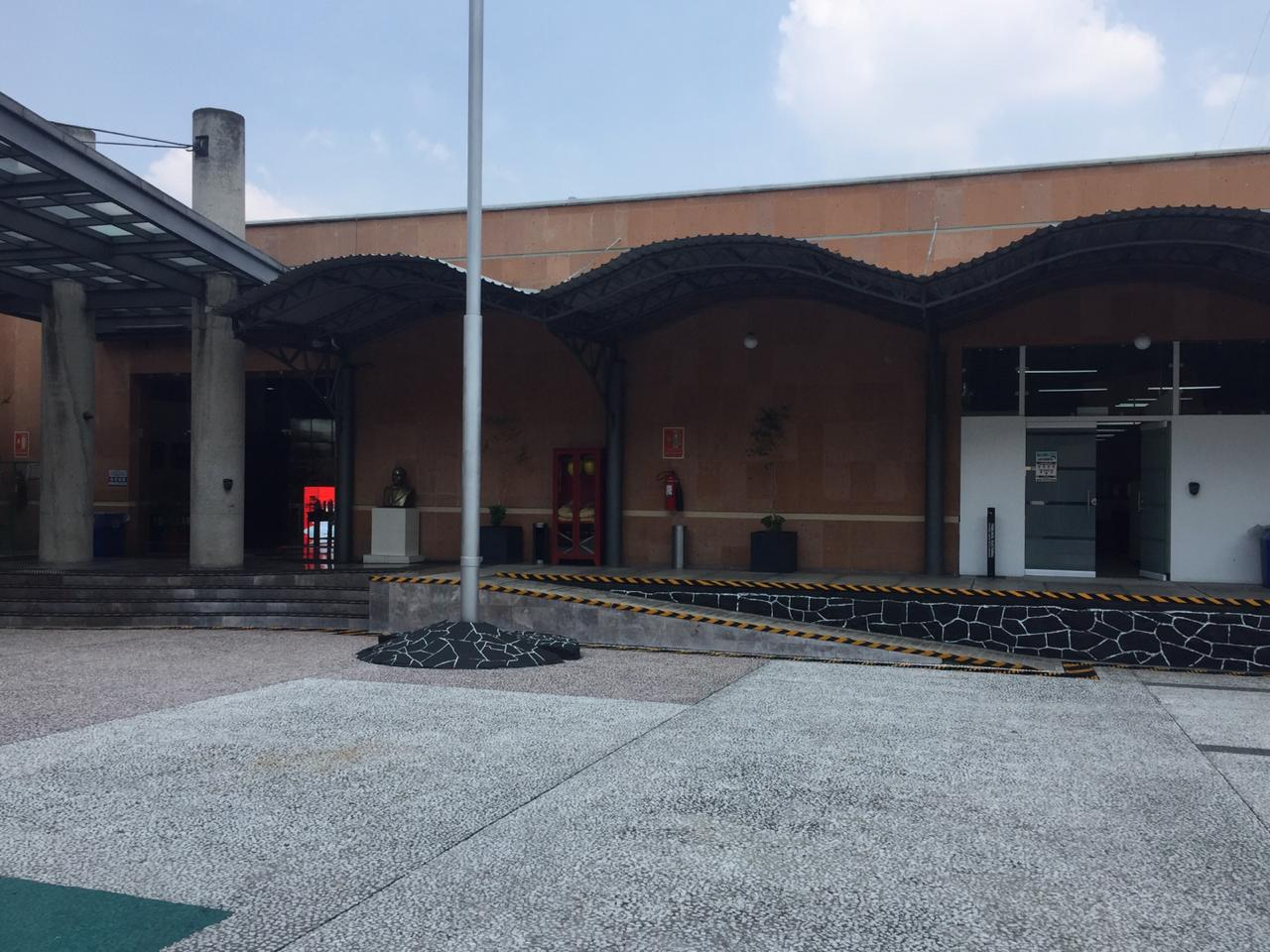
- Motto: Spanish: Contribuimos a mejorar la impartición de la justicia electoral y a fortalecer la democracia, a través de la formación, capacitación e investigación
- School type: Public law school
- Dean: Gabriela Dolores Ruvalcaba García
- Location: Coyoacán, Ciudad de México, Mexico
- Website: www.te.gob.mx/eje

The Electoral Judicial School of the Federal Electoral Tribunal (Spanish: Escuela Judicial Electoral del Poder Judicial de la Federación) is a Mexican educational institution dependent on the Federal Electoral Tribunal, which is specialized in training, research, and dissemination of information on electoral matters.

It offers postgraduate programs, training and update courses, academic events such as seminars, conferences, workshops, generates and manages specialized research on electoral jurisdictional matters, and coordinates editorial works.

== Academic programs ==
The Electoral Judicial School of the Federal Electoral Tribunal's academic programs include various options on Mexican electoral matters:

- Master's degrees in Electoral Law with professional orientation.
- PhD in Electoral Law
- Diploma in Electoral Law
- Masters Classes
- Open courses
- Online courses

== See also ==
- Federal Electoral Institute
- Federal Electoral Tribunal
