= José Woldenberg =

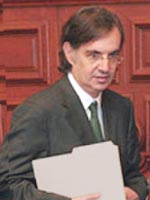

1st President of the Federal Electoral Institute of Mexico
- In office 1996–2003
- Succeeded by: Luis Carlos Ugalde

Personal details
- Born: Isaac José Woldenberg Karakowski; 8 September 1952 (age 74) Monterrey, Nuevo León
- Citizenship: Mexican
- Spouse: Julia Carabias (divorced)
- Education: National Autonomous University of Mexico (UNAM)
- Occupation: Political scientist, editor and commentator.

Isaac José Woldenberg Karakowski (born 8 September 1952) is a Mexican political scientist and sociologist who served as the first president of the Federal Electoral Institute (IFE) and currently works as director of Nexos magazine.

== Early life ==
Woldenberg was born in Monterrey into a Jewish family that had immigrated from Eastern Europe. His father, originally from Poland, arrived in Veracruz at the age of two and lived a few years in San Luis Potosí, while his mother was born in the northern state of Chihuahua into a family originally from Lithuania.

He graduated from the National Autonomous University of Mexico (UNAM) with a bachelor's degree in Sociology (1975), a master's degree in Latin American Studies (1987) and began a doctorate in Political Science (1993-1995), but didn't complete it. During his college years he also studied film-making at the Centro Universitario de Estudios Cinematográficos (1972-1975), but dropped out after three years.

== Career ==
He was drawn into politics in his twenties, spending five days in jail for his involvement in a university strike and becoming a founding member of the Unified Socialist Party of Mexico (PSUM, 1987), the Mexican Socialist Party (PMS, 1987) and the Party of the Democratic Revolution (PRD, 1989) which he left in April 1991.

He has worked as a Political Science professor at the National Autonomous University and has authored several books, including Antecedentes del sindicalismo (1981), Memoria de la izquierda (1998) and La construcción de la democracia (2002).

== Personal life ==
He was previously married to Julia Carabias, who served as Secretary of the Environment in the cabinet of Ernesto Zedillo, with whom he had a daughter.
