= Luis Carlos Ugalde =

Mexican scholar (born 1966)

Luis Carlos Ugalde Ramírez (born 1966) is a Mexican scholar who served as president of the Federal Electoral Institute (IFE) from 2003 to 2007.

== Education ==
Luis Carlos Ugalde was born in Mexico City in 1966. He received a Ph.D. in Political Science (1999) and a Master's Degree in Political Science (1994) and Public Administration (1992), all from Columbia University. He also holds a B.A. in Economics from the Instituto Tecnológico Autónomo de México (ITAM) (1990).

== Career ==
Ugalde has combined a career in academics and consulting with high-ranking positions within the Mexican government. Most notably, he served as president of Mexico's electoral commission (Instituto Federal Electoral, IFE) from 2003-2007, presiding over the institution during the country's bitterly contested 2006 presidential election.

Ugalde has taught at various universities in Mexico and the United States, among them the Instituto Tecnológico Autónomo de México (ITAM), the Center for Economic Research and Teaching (CIDE), Harvard University, Georgetown University and American University. In 2011 he was a Reagan-Fascell Democracy Fellow at the National Endowment for Democracy in Washington, D.C.

In addition to his academic career, he has worked in the Mexican government. He was chief of staff to the Secretary of Energy in 1997 and chief of staff at the Embassy of Mexico to the United States, from 1997 to 2000. Ugalde showed political ambitions form an early stage and was linked to the long time ruling party of Mexico, the PRI, where he served as part of the ideology commission, linked to Jesús Reyes Heroles.

In October 2003, Congress appointed Luis Carlos Ugalde as president of the Federal Electoral Institute (IFE). During the 2006 presidential election, he faced criticism when one of the candidates demanded a recount amid widespread controversy over the results. Electoral authorities under Ugalde were accused of complicity in alleged electoral fraud, leading to increased political pressure and calls for reform.

As part of the 2007 Electoral Reform, provisions were introduced to replace the IFE president. Although Congress was required to appoint Ugalde’s successor by 13 December 2007, the decision was postponed until February 2008. Anticipating his removal, Ugalde resigned on 14 December 2007, first before the General Council and subsequently before Congress.

He has authored several publications, including As I Lived It: A Testimony of the Most Competitive Election in the Modern History of Mexico (2008, in Spanish) and The Mexican Congress: Old Player, New Power, published in 2000 by the Center for Strategic and International Studies in Washington, D.C.

In January 2008, Ugalde became the Robert F. Kennedy Visiting Professor of Latin American Studies at Harvard University. Then in 2009, Luis Carlos Ugalde joined the faculty of the Department of Political Science at ITAM, where he taught courses on comparative politics, democracy in Latin America, and Mexican politics. As of August 2025, Luis Carlos Ugalde is the executive director and founder of Integralia Consultants, a firm dedicated to research and consultancy in areas related to transparency, accountability, good governance, and political and legislative intelligence.

== Personal life ==
In December 2003, Ugalde married Lía Limón García, future member of the Mexican Chamber of Deputies and mayor of the Mexico City Borough of Álvaro Obregón. They divorced a year later. He is the brother of Marco Antonio Ugalde Ramírez, founder and director of the Stacatto Choir at the National Autonomous University of Mexico.

Preceded by José Woldenberg	President of the Federal Electoral Institute; 2003–2007	Succeeded by Andrés Albo
