= El Universal (Mexico City) =

Mexican newspaper

- Spanish: El gran diario de México (Mexico's great newspaper)

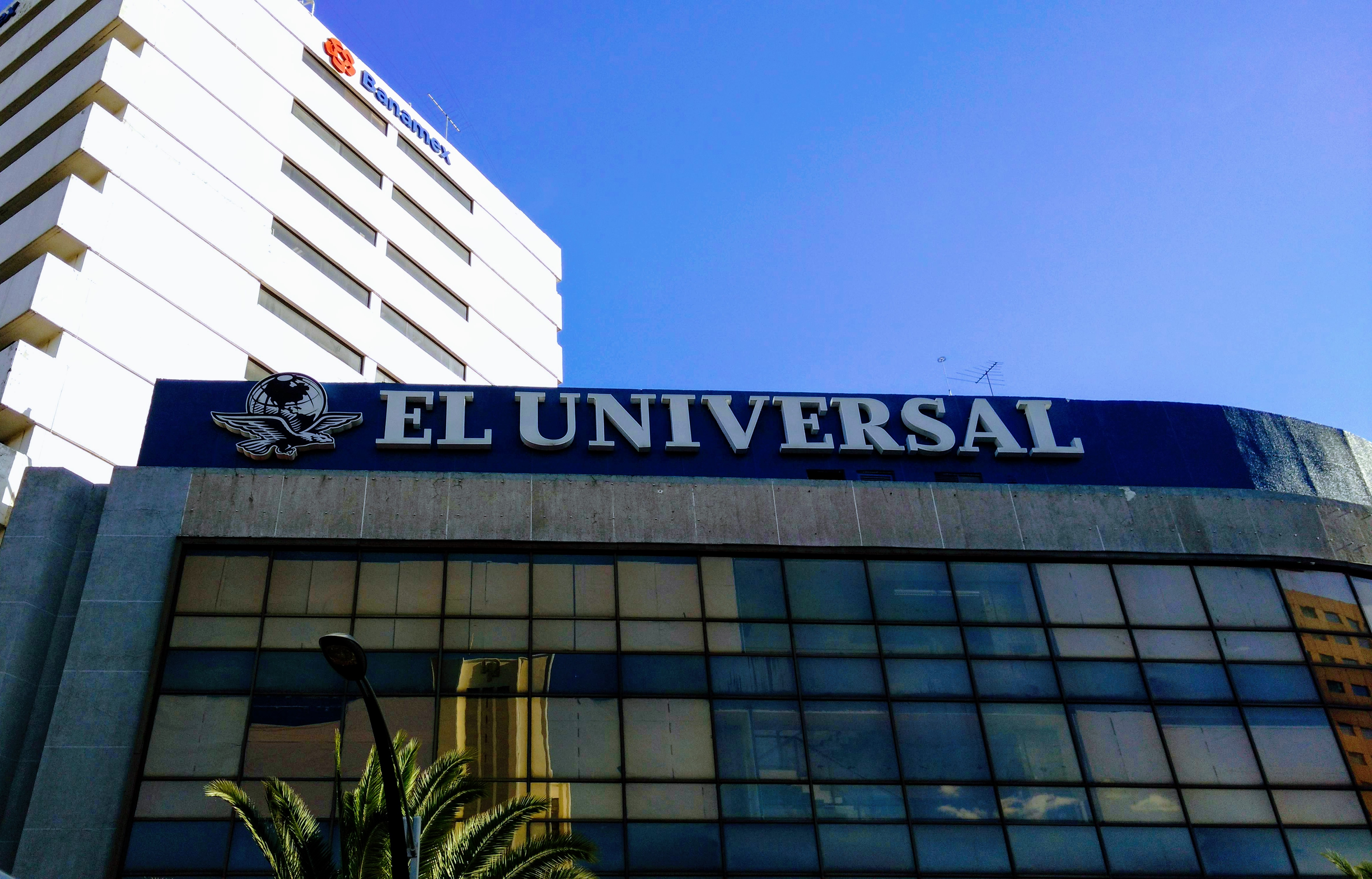
- Type: Daily newspaper
- Format: Broadsheet
- Founder: Félix Fulgencio Palavicini
- President: Juan Francisco Ealy Ortiz
- Editor: Juan Francisco Ealy Jr.
- Founded: 1916; 110 years ago
- Language: Spanish
- Headquarters: Mexico City, Mexico
- Circulation: 133,400 daily
- ISSN: 1563-7719
- OCLC number: 757862690
- Website: www.eluniversal.com.mx

El Universal is a Mexican newspaper based in Mexico City.

== History ==
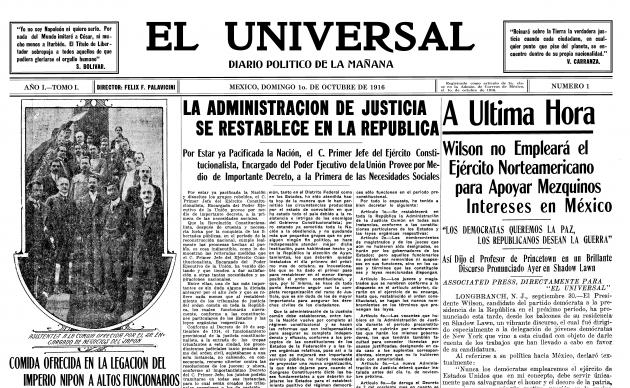
First issue of El Universal, published on 1 October 1916

El Universal was founded by Félix Palavicini and Emilio Rabasa in October 1916, in the city of Santiago de Querétaro to cover the end of the Mexican Revolution and the creation of the new Mexican Constitution.

In 2013 the El Universal website claimed to have an average of more than 16 million unique visitors each month, with 140 million page views, and 4 million followers on Facebook.

Aviso Oportuno is the classifieds service of El Universal. The brand has become widely known in Mexico, and the phrase Aviso Oportuno is sometimes used as a generic term for the classifieds business. This brand has four sub-sites: Inmuebles, Vehículos, Empleos and Varios (Real Estate, Vehicles, Jobs and Miscellaneous).

News items are open to reader comments through a simple sign-up system which has resulted in many accusations of bias and propaganda. The system also tends towards anonymity and abuse by having questionable users and operators pass as average readers discrediting political and journalistic adversaries.

== Controversies ==
- The publication has been accused by the political left in Mexico of having a cozy relationship with past governments during key periods in the nation's fraught history. The day after the Tlatelolco massacre on 3 October 1968, at the height of the Mexican Dirty War, El Universal published misleading headlines such as, «Terrorists and Soldiers Sustain Harsh Combat During Several Hours» and «Tlatelolco: Battle Camp». Under pressure, the editorial board gave a statement saying, "With pride, we can say that 'El Universal' adequately covered the facts during those days. Perhaps, like many of the publications of our era, we had too much confidence in the word of our government, but we've been honest."
- On 3 December 2012, political expert and city planner Andrés Lajous wrote a column in Animal Político justifying his exit from El Universal as the editorial board had modified the title of his column titled, «El robo de vehículos durante el gobierno de Peña Nieto» ("the theft of cars during the government of Peña Nieto)", referencing President Enrique Peña Nieto when he was the governor of the State of Mexico and his ties to the theft of vehicles. The column was published on 13 April 2012. In his article, Lajous Loaza argues that when he tried to summon a response from the editors for the headline change, he was told that, "the decision was last minute and comes from the highers ups." He stated that he was promised a new headline, but that nothing ever came. Because of this incident, Lajous Loaeza resigned shortly thereafter as he felt he was not guaranteed the freedom to write critical pieces about the government without editorial interference.
- On 25 December 2017, The New York Times published an article titled, «Using Billions in Government Cash, Mexico Controls News Media» signaling El Universal as the largest beneficiary of government funds in the form of publicity and, consequently, transforming the newspaper into an attack dog for the government in power during the elections of 2018 against its adversaries. In response, the Mexican publication ran a story on 26 December 2017 in which they accuse the information obtained by The New York Times as false and biased.

== See also ==
- La Jornada
- Reforma
- The Herald Mexico – A joint venture between El Universal and The Miami Herald.
- List of newspapers in Mexico
