= The Herald Mexico =

English language newspaper in Mexico City

- Type: Daily newspaper
- Format: Tabloid
- Owner: El Universal / The Miami Herald
- Founded: April 21, 2004
- Ceased publication: June 1, 2007
- Language: English
- Headquarters: Mexico City; Mexico
- Website: mexiconews.com.mx

The Herald Mexico was a daily English language newspaper published in Mexico City, Mexico from 2004 to 2007. It was an international joint venture between The Miami Herald of Miami, Florida, United States, and El Universal, a widely circulated Spanish language newspaper also published in Mexico City. It was distinct from The Miami Herald International Edition, launched in 1946, and from El Nuevo Herald (originally El Herald), launched in 1976 as a Spanish-language supplement to The Miami Herald but later published separately.

The paper ceased publication after the issue of May 31, 2007. This was a joint decision made by The Miami Herald and El Universal.
