= Democracy in Mexico =

North American political system since 1824

Flag of Mexico

Mexico has been a democracy since 1824. Its history includes periods of democratization and democratic backsliding.

After a long history under the Spanish Empire (1521–1821), Mexico gained its independence in 1821 and became the First Mexican Empire led by royalist military officer Agustín de Iturbide. Three years later, a federal republic was created under the Constitution of 1824. However, the republic was truncated by a series of military coups, most notably that of politician-general Antonio López de Santa Anna. Santa Anna held immense sway over the fledgling Mexican democracy until 1855, when he was ousted by liberal politicians.

The liberals drafted and ratified the Constitution of 1857, which enshrined rights such as universal male suffrage and eliminated Church and military privileges. The overthrow of Santa Anna, however, led to widespread dissatisfaction among conservative Mexicans and led to a twenty-two-year conflict and two wars between conservatives and liberals. In 1862, on the invitation of Mexican conservatives, Maximilian Habsburg was crowned Emperor of Mexico after a successful French invasion of the country.

From 1876 to 1911, regular elections were held, but the electorate remained politically unengaged. This era was known as the Porfiriato – the presidency of Porfirio Díaz, who ascended to power via military coup in 1876 and held power directly and indirectly until 1910. As resentment towards Díaz increased, the Mexican Revolution broke out in 1910 and caused a civil war, which ended with the creation of the new Constitution after its ratification on 5 February 1917.

Mexican politics was then dominated by the secular Constitutionalists, who had won the ensuing civil war. Regular elections were held, but results were often manipulated. Though the "anti-re-electionist principle" still stood, mandating that incumbent presidents could not be re-elected, presidents often nominated their successors. The result was that the ruling Institutional Revolutionary Party (PRI) held near-complete control over the electoral mechanism, essentially turning Mexico into a one-party state until 1988, when its left-wing factions broke off. Women's suffrage was introduced in 1953.

Mexican politics saw change in 2000 when the conservative opposition National Action Party (PAN) candidate Vicente Fox won the presidential election. He was succeeded by the next candidate of the PAN, Felipe Calderón, in 2006. The PRI returned to power in 2012, after Enrique Peña Nieto won the presidency, but was defeated by Andrés Manuel López Obrador's new National Regeneration Movement (MORENA) coalition in 2018.

Mexico was ranked 11th least electoral democracy in Latin America and the Caribbean according to V-Dem Democracy indices in 2023 with a score of 0.598 out of one.

== Colonial government (1521–1808) ==
Coat of arms of New Spain

As an overseas territory of the Spanish Empire, colonial Mexico was a component of Spain's absolute monarchy and was overseen by the Council of the Indies. Its officials were appointed royal officials with broad legal powers. They could draft laws ordinances and decrees, exercise judicial review, act as the Supreme Court for colony-initiated cases, supervise indigenous people, censor printed reports, oversee the colonial treasury, and organize local government inspections. The council also approved all of the colonies' civil, military and religious appointees, leaving a small number of positions to be selected by the colonists themselves.

The Viceroyalty of New Spain was the jurisdiction for crown rule in what is now Mexico. The viceroy was the highest crown official selected by the Spanish king to be the "king's living image" and personal representative. He functioned as the chief executive, supervised the military, and acted as the president of the administrative court of the colony. The viceroy also nominated minor officials and distributed land and titles, all subject to the approval of the Council of the Indies and, ultimately, the Spanish monarch.

The Real Audiencia, the high court located in Spain, administered royal justice. During the early era of colonization, governors overseeing the smaller jurisdictions of the audiencia were appointed by the viceroy, but the crown incrementally took over the appointment of these designations. Governors were not re-appointed consecutively to oversee the same district. Indigenous villages were overseen by a corregidor, while alcalde mayors oversaw European settlements. Each town included a surrounding district of settled area, governed by a council (cabildo) of five to fifteen men, typically wealthy criollos. The council annually elected a chief magistrate and selected the constable, standard-bearer, inspector of weights and measures, and the collector of fines. Spaniards, both European- and American-born, held the dominant bureaucratic and social positions.

Everyone was deemed a subject of the crown but not necessarily a citizen of the empire. The crown held authority, but there was no equality before the law. Different races and statuses conferred particular rights or obligations. Indigenous persons were members of the Republic of Indians (República de Indios), while all others—Spaniards, mixed-race castas, and Afro-Mexicans—were members of the Republic of Spaniards (República de Españoles). There were separate courts under the jurisdiction of the Catholic church for the members of the clergy and the Inquisition to ensure religious orthodoxy and practice. The military, established in the late eighteenth century, held special privileges (fuero militar), which was extended to non-white members. The crown gave privileges to elite corporate groups of silver mine owners and high-level merchants, creating consulados. There was a separate General Indian Court with jurisdiction over disputes of individuals and indigenous communities. Indians were also excluded from Catholic courts and from military service as they were deemed legal minors.

With the eighteenth-century Bourbon Reforms in New Spain, which created 12 intendancies and weakened the power of the viceroy, the ayuntamientos (municipal councils) "became the institution representing the interests of the local and regional oligarchical groups then setting deep roots into their territories". These municipal councils were to become extremely important in the independence era following the 1808 French invasion of Spain.

Indigenous political participation in the colonial era was found at the local level in indigenous communities. The crown's designation of indigenous communities as "republics" was a practical one at conquest, allowing indigenous communities to maintain their existing political processes and social hierarchies, which were used to incorporate the indigenous peaceably into the empire. Indigenous elites (principales) in their communities were the interface with the Spanish colonial government. Indigenous city-states (Nahuatl: altepetl; Mayan: Cah; Mixtec: Ñnu) became pueblos and their ruling structures outwardly conformed to Spanish models of municipal government, the cabildo or ayuntamiento (municipal council). These municipal councils became the bulwark of indigenous communities' defense of their interests, petitioning the crown over grievances and litigating in court. The cabildo also became the instrument of Spanish colonial rule in their communities, collecting taxes and mobilizing labor. The seat of the cabildo was in the head town (cabecera) with jurisdiction over subject communities (sujetos). Subject communities increasingly sought autonomy from the head towns to manage their own affairs. Even where only indigenous elites participated in elections to the town council, "elections depended on forging of a local consensus if indigenous councils were to rule with legitimacy". Historian Antonio Annino argues that these autonomous pueblos were key in the history of liberal citizenship in Mexico.

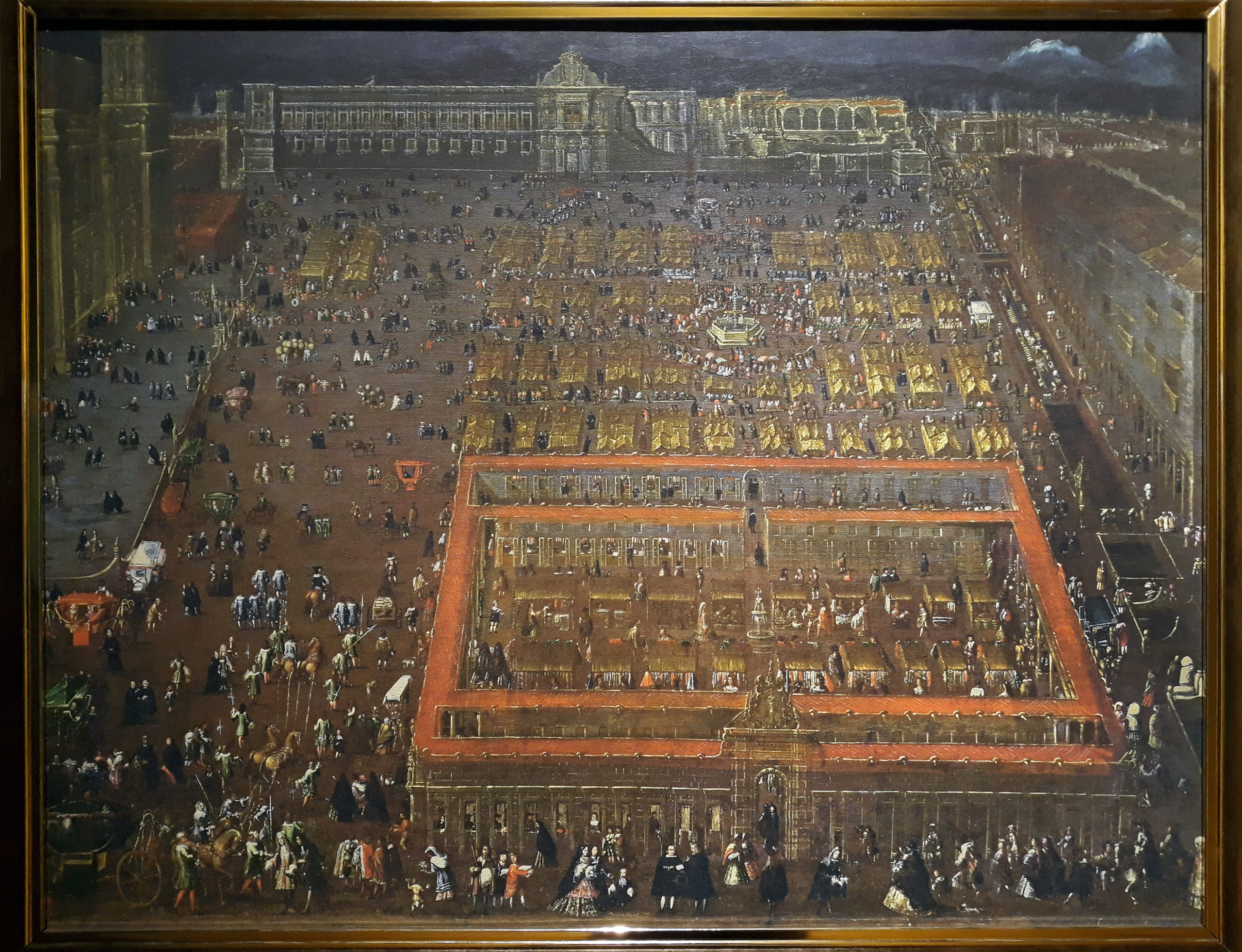
View of the Plaza Mayor of Mexico City (1695), showing the damage to the viceroy's palace from the 1692 riot (top right).

When communities petitioned royal or ecclesiastical officials for the redress of wrongs through peaceful means, those feeling wronged could and sometimes did resort to violence. Local rebellions in Indian communities were a feature of the colonial period, which were usually short-lived and did not spread to neighboring communities. There were two major riots in Mexico City during the colonial era. The riot of 1624 saw the American-born elites mobilizing the urban poor to riot against the new, reformist viceroy, Marqués de Gelves, who sought to bring an end to corrupt practices of royal officials, as well as targeting freedoms enjoyed by the mixed-race population. A riot broke out in the main square of Mexico City, the Zócalo, where the palace of the viceroy was located. The rioters shouted slogans that affirmed their allegiance to the king and denounced the new viceroy. The rioters and their elite white supporters succeeded in ousting the viceroy and the crown did not attempt to impose reforms for another century. Another large-scale urban riot occurred in 1692, in which rioters partially destroyed the palace of the viceroy and looted upscale shops. The viceroy sought to restore order and reaffirm royal authority, which the rioters had challenged. He considered the riot evidence of class warfare with Spanish authority at risk.

== Independence era (1808–1821) ==
Rule of Spain and its overseas territories by an absolute monarch was disrupted when Spain was invaded by Napoleon's armies in 1808, touching off sweeping political changes in New Spain. With the French invasion, the Spanish monarch Charles IV of Spain was forced to abdicate and Napoleon's brother Joseph Bonaparte was made monarch. For Spain and its overseas territories, this presented a situation that challenged the legitimacy of the monarchy. Juntas arose in Spain and its overseas territories to claim sovereignty in the name of the legitimate Spanish monarch.

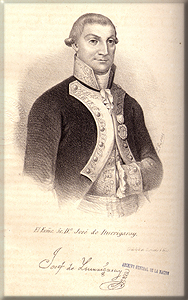
Viceroy José de Iturrigaray, ousted by coup 15 September 1808.

In New Spain, the municipal council of Mexico City was the body where wealthy and influential American-born Spaniards held political power. It took the lead in arguing for home rule in New Spain. Together with Viceroy José de Iturrigaray, autonomist councilors sought to create a junta that would rule in the place of the king. They argued that the abdication of the Spanish monarch after the French invasion rendered the previous ruling structures null and void, but the high court (audiencia), the leading voice of traditional rule, countered the arguments of the ayuntamiento, saying that the structures had been established by the legitimate monarch and should remain in place. City councilors met from July to mid-September 1808, which were moving toward creating a convocation of representatives of the realm, which would have considered the place of New Spain within the empire. Viceroy Iturrigaray was sympathetic to these consulado, all of whom were peninsular-born Spaniards, which prompted the members of the high court and the elite merchant to remove and jail the viceroy and his supporters on 15 September 1808. The violent coup radicalized the situation in New Spain. Unlike elsewhere in Spanish America, in which the ayuntamientos of the viceroyalties created juntas to rule in place of the monarch, the coup prevented Mexico City's municipal council from exercising that function.

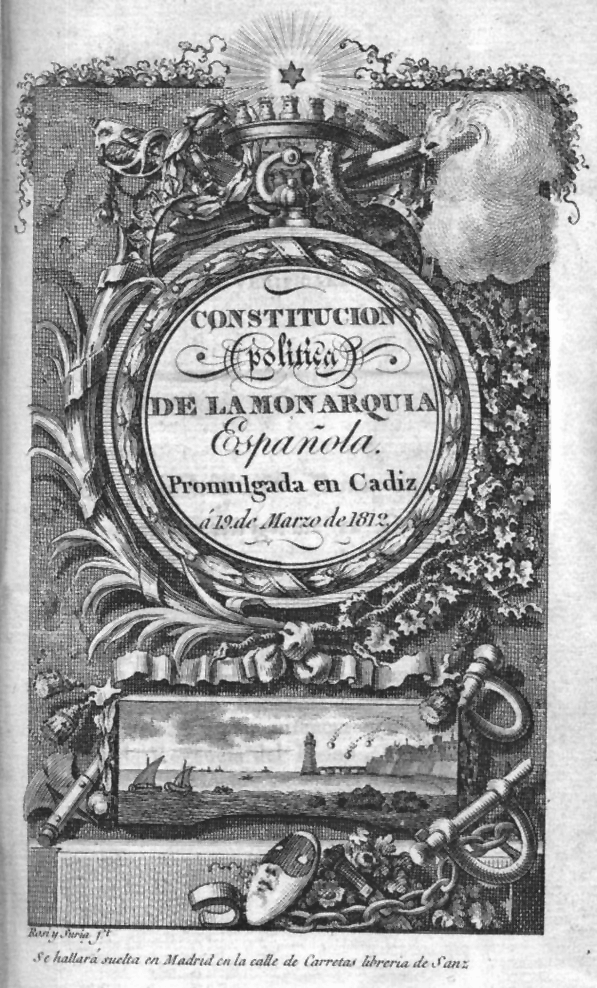
The Constitution of Cádiz, 1812

In Spain, the Supreme Junta assembled delegates from the juntas in the constituent peninsular kingdoms. Delegates from New Spain soon joined the assembly known as the Cortes of Cádiz to consider how legitimate rule could continue in the current situation. The cortes rejected Melchor de Jovellanos's proposal for a reversion to absolute monarchy in favor of drafting a constitution. The Spanish Constitution of 1812 was the result. It called for a continuation the monarchy and retention of Roman Catholicism as the sole religious institution, but weakened the power of the crown by mandating a constitutional monarchy and reduced the power of the church and nobility. The constitution incorporated principles of classical liberalism. It affirmed national sovereignty, separation of powers, freedom of the press, free enterprise, abolished feudalism, and established a constitutional monarchy with a parliamentary system. It was one of the first constitutions that allowed universal male suffrage (with the exception of those of African ancestry) through a complex indirect electoral system. There were 303 delegates to the Cortes, of which 37 were from Spain's overseas territory and seven from New Spain. The Cortes ultimately approved a distinction between nationality and citizenship—only citizens had the right to vote. The constitution granted citizenship to indigenous peoples of Spanish America, but limited the vote to men whose ancestry originated in Spain, including American-born Spaniards, known as criollos. Peninsular-born Spaniards sought this limitation in order to retain control; if the total population of the overseas territories was granted the right to vote, they would have vastly outnumbered Peninsular-born Spaniards. Although indigenous populations were granted citizenship, anyone of African or mixed-race casta ancestry was excluded unless naturalized. Slaves were excluded from citizenship. Conservative criollos from New Spain agreed with these provisions since they gave them an equal voice with peninsular Spaniards and power remained in the hands of white men.

In 1809, New Spain chose delegates to the Cortes of Cádiz via indirect elections. The Cortes drafted the 1812 Constitution, and, once it was promulgated, indirect elections were set for Spain and its overseas possessions. As elsewhere in the empire, officials in New Spain took an oath to obey the constitution, and the first elections in New Spain were set for 29 November 1812. For the election, New Spain was divided into the provinces of Mexico, Puebla, Valladolid, Guanajuato, Oaxaca, Veracruz, San Luis Potosí, Tlaxcala, and Querétaro. The provincial electors were to meet in the capital of each province to elect their respective deputies to the Cortes in Spain and the provincial deputation. The province of Mexico, being the most populous and home to the capital, was entitled to 14 deputies and four alternates to the Cortes. The election in Mexico City had been examined closely. Although some conservatives in the early nineteenth-century asserted the elections were unruly and that voting was irregular, with individuals voting more than once in different parishes, Nettie Lee Benson's research shows that voting was orderly and those ineligible were barred from voting. There was no literacy requirement to vote until 1830. Benson notes that the 1812 "is used as incontestable proof that the country was not prepared for a democratic form of government when it was first attempted" but instead concludes that "it would seem that the election of 1812, at least in Mexico City, was as legal and as orderly as any average election in any country".

The 1812 constitution had profound consequences for the repúblicas de indios that had achieved a level of autonomy under Spanish colonial rule. The constitution recognized the members of these indigenous communities as participants in the body politic. Town councils became ayuntamientos, and their prominent male heads of the household became vecinos with rights as citizens. Since the constitution empowered the elected town councils on an equal basis, there was a splintering of the old head town-subject community model, creating new autonomous indigenous communities; the number of cabildos increased from around 100 before the Cortes de Cádiz to nearly 1,000 a decade later at Mexican independence in 1821.

When Napoleon was defeated and the Bourbon monarchy was re-established in 1814, Ferdinand VII claimed to accept the provisions of the Constitution, but once restored to the throne, he reasserted absolute monarchy. Liberal military officers ousted the monarch in 1820 and reinstated the Constitution of 1812, during a three-year period known as the Liberal Triennium. With liberals back in power in Spain, conservatives in New Spain began to see the logic of political independence. Royal army officer Agustín de Iturbide joined with mixed-race insurgent leader Vicente Guerrero and issued the Plan of Iguala, which called for Mexican independence, recognition of Roman Catholicism as the sole religion, and the abolition of legal racial categories and distinctions between American-born and European-born Spaniards. Their Army of the Three Guarantees was joined by royal army members and insurgents alike, and royal rule collapsed in New Spain.

== First Empire (1821–1823) ==
Flag of the Mexican Empire. The motif is Aztec, with an eagle perched on a nopal cactus. Note the crown on the eagle's head, indicating the monarchy.

Mexico did not initially establish a democracy upon securing independence: Agustín de Iturbide manipulated the newly founded political institutions and military to establish an empire that remained intact until pressure from Antonio López de Santa Anna forced him to abdicate.

After the war, the country was governed by a provisional governing junta, whose 38 delegates were all conservatives chosen by Iturbide. This council excluded two guerrilla leaders, Guadalupe Victoria and Vicente Guerrero, who were deemed by some historians to have been essential to securing Mexico's independence.

The first thing the junta sought to do was to hold elections for a congress that would write Mexico's new constitution. To select the delegates for the Congress, town councils chose electors who then selected delegates for each province. Each province's delegation had to select one secular clergyman, one military representative, and one judge or lawyer. The nobility, mining, commercial, and industrial sectors also had reserved seats. As noted by historian Robert Miller, these regulations put the congress "in the hands of conservatives, professionals, the wealthy and the aristocracy – no seats were available to the lower classes". In other words, the interests of the masses were largely unrepresented in the congress, making the convention undemocratic in nature.

In the Constituent Congress, a handful of liberals advocated for a republic, while the conservatives sought a monarchy headed by a European prince. Iturbide's partisans tried to manipulate the constitutional debates to crown Iturbide as emperor. Though Iturbide's popularity among the delegates began to wane, Iturbide organized the military to demonstrate in his favor. After a "spontaneous demonstration" in the capital, soldiers gathered around Iturbide's house, begging him to become emperor. Iturbide went to the congress and asked for their approval, and without legal quorum, was selected as the constitutional emperor of Mexico.

The army, however, contained numerous Freemasons that associated with liberal civilians who championed a representative government. Antonio López de Santa Anna, thus, found support from this portion of the army and ex-revolutionary leaders and published the Plan of Casa Mata, which called for a new congress and national representation. With mounting pressure from Santa Anna's force and from the general public, Iturbide was forced to resign.

== First constititution and early republic (1824–1855) ==
Flag of the First Federal Republic of the United Mexican States. The eagle of the new republic no longer wears a crown and has a snake in its mouth.

The ouster of the First Empire provided an opportunity to establish a federated republic with representative democratic forms under the Constitution of 1824. Although the new constitution formalized democratic principles for the new nation-state, military officers from the era of independence became the political leaders in the young republic. Multiple coups undermined these principles. General Antonio López de Santa Anna, initially a liberal who became conservative, emerged as the military strongman (caudillo), dominating Mexican politics until 1855.

=== Second Constituent Congress ===
With the fall of Iturbide's monarchy, Mexican leaders began crafting a constitution, creating a federal republic. A Second Constituent Congress was formed, which represented the provinces and people of Mexico more equitably, moving away from authoritarianism and towards democratic representation. The 1824 Constitution made Mexico a federal republic with a president, vice president, a bicameral legislature, and a judiciary. In addition to the federal government, the constitution established 19 states, each of which would elect a governor and state congress.

=== Democracy truncated by coups ===
Despite promises for democracy, the era after the ratification of the Constitution of 1824 was marked by successive military coups. Only one president, General Guadalupe Victoria, remained in office for a full term over the next forty years as liberal and conservative factions fought fiercely for control of the government. According to historian Robert Miller, "Upon taking power, the new group not only changed key government personnel, it also rewrote laws and even the constitution to reflect its philosophy." During this time, liberals in Mexico continued to favor states' rights and federalism; conservatives advocated for a centralized state, not discarding the option of a dictatorship, with government positions controlled by the elite. The first two presidents elected under the Constitution of 1824 partnered with conservative vice presidents. In both instances, the conservative vice presidents fostered the loyalty of the military and used it to stage coups in a bid to remove the liberals from power. The second – led by Anastasio Bustamante – was successful. Busamante, nonetheless, was not strong enough to create the centralist regime he wanted; thus, factions emerged. Valentín Gómez Farías led an ideological campaign against Bustamante in conjunction with a military campaign led by Santa Anna.

After successfully ousting Bustamante, Santa Anna took over the presidency, though he left executive power primarily in the hands of Gómez Farías. Gómez Farías was removed from office by a military coup after he attempted to reduce the size of the military and curtailed the power of the Roman Catholic Church. In 1835, Congress passed a centralist constitution that replaced the states with departments whose governors would be selected by the president. Chaos ensued after a French invasion, and the congress elected in 1842 was tasked with creating a new constitution in the shadow of Santa Anna's presidency. The congressmen – mainly young liberals and federalists – produced two drafts of constitutions, neither of which fulfilled Santa Anna's desire for a centralist regime. The army thus disbanded the congress. A new committee of leading conservative landowners, clerics, army officers, and lawyers created a new centralist constitution, and, while it did not give the president absolute powers, Santa Anna approved and it was soon ratified. Santa Anna stayed in power until 1855 when increasing revolts forced him to abdicate.

== Liberal–conservative conflict (1857–1876) ==
Flag of the Second Mexican Empire

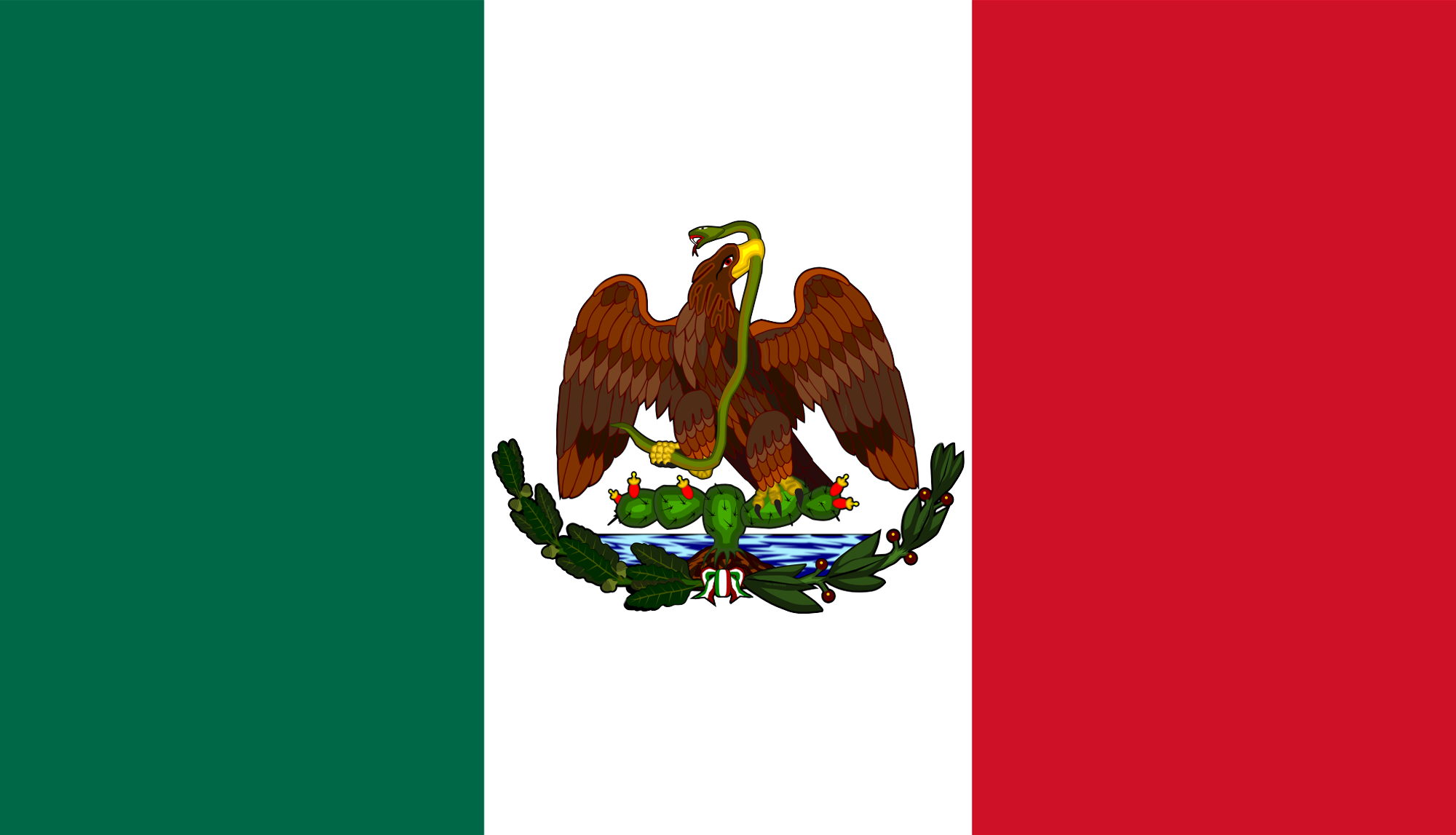
Flag of the Restored Republic

The removal of Santa Anna created a short period of democracy, truncated by renewed fighting between the liberal and conservative factions, and was then reinstated at the end of the Reform War. The democracy was cut short yet again by a French invasion that re-established an empire.

=== Liberal in-fighting and French invasion ===
Santa Anna's ousting prompted the creation of a new constitution based on principles of radical liberalism. The Constitution of 1857 incorporated the Juárez and Lerdo Laws. The simultaneous election of a conservative president and the selection of a liberal president of the supreme court and the liberals' push for strong reform laws triggered the Reform War. The war ended with a liberal victory, and elections were held in 1867 with Benito Juárez as president. While the nation continued to be sharply divided between conservative and liberal factions, the next nine years saw democratic elections for both the presidency and congress.

The growth of democracy was truncated by France's successful invasion of Mexico in 1862. Conservatives crowned Maximilian Hapsburg as emperor of the country, marking the nation's return to monarchy. The army which had attempted to prevent the invasion, led by Benito Juárez, started to receive US aid at the end of the American Civil War in 1865. The same year, Napoleon III declared he would no longer aid Maximilian I and urged him to abdicate. Maximilian was taken prisoner by Juárez's army, along with conservative Generals Miguel Miramón and Tomás Mejía. All three were executed in June 1867, and Juárez was reinstated as president.

=== Increase of executive power ===
After Juarez's death, Sebastián Lerdo de Tejada was elected president. Lerdo de Tejada did not reinforce the existing democratic structure, instead successfully proposing a motion to transform the unicameral legislature into a bicameral system. By adding the Senate to the existing Chamber of Deputies, Lerdo de Tejada sought to increase the executive's influence over the Congress and push for the increased centralization of power. In conjunction with his anti-clerical policies, Lerdo de Tejada became highly unpopular. General Porfirio Díaz was thus able to rally the support of some of his fellow generals and successfully launch a revolt.

== Porfiriato (1876–1911) ==
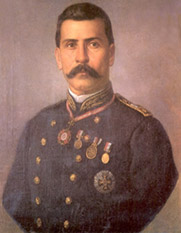
Liberal General Porfirio Díaz

Porfirio Díaz was a general who ruled Mexico from 1876 until his overthrow in 1911 in a period known as the Porfiriato. He ran for the first time in the 1867 general election, in which he lost to Benito Juárez in a congress dominated by Juárez's supporters. In 1871, Díaz called for the ousting of Juárez with the failed Plan de la Noria, demanding free elections and expressing his opposition to reelection.

Juárez died in 1872, and his successor, Sebastián Lerdo de Tejada, was overthrown under the 1876 Plan of Tuxtepec. Díaz won the 1877 presidential election unopposed. Once in power, his "no to reelection" slogan was amended to stipulate that a person could not be reelected for consecutive terms and, later, to allow for consecutive terms.

Díaz became a dictator, and during his rule he boosted the country's economy by developing telecommunications, including the expansion of the railroad network and telegraph lines, which attracted foreign capital. However, he openly displayed anti-democratic tendencies, organizing fraudulent elections and either reelecting himself or appointing provisional puppet presidents. Díaz himself said that capitalism would eventually allow more democracy. The editors of the newspaper La Gaceta Comercial downplayed the criticism that opponents of Díaz's government were voicing at the time:

Men of experience care little or nothing if governments are republican or monarchical; what is important is that, under one name or the other, in this or that form, that they realize the ends of the State—security and justice, progress through order

In 1895, 90 percent of the population was struggling financially, while 2 percent belonged to the privileged class. Justo Sierra viewed the lack of democracy as an advantage "for the sake of other phases of its social evolution", and he asserted that reelections were necessary to protect foreign capital and confidence.

Though Porfirio Díaz's coup d'état brought stability to Mexico's politics and significant economic growth in a period known as the Porfirato, this stability did not equate to democracy. Díaz's iron fist rule permitted little opposition to his regime, while his policies increased already-rampant inequality. Díaz ruled until 1911, after the Mexican Revolution broke out in 1910.

=== First term ===
During his first term, Díaz employed no mass repression, imprisonments or execution of his enemies, and allowed for national and local elections to be held. Nonetheless, though he had originally catapulted himself to public favor by advocating against the centralization promoted by Lerdo de Tejada, once in office he successfully passed an amendment which would allow an individual to run for re-election after a lapse. This allowed Díaz's friend General Manuel González to take the presidency. Fredrich Katz argues that "González distinguished himself by his corruption" allowing Díaz to easily win a second term.

=== Second term and extensions ===
Díaz's second term marked the "first effective and long-lasting dictatorship to emerge in Mexico since the advent of independence" through a series of anti-democratic moves. Every candidate that wished to be elected or re-elected had to obtain Díaz's approval. The dictator barred the election of any of his opponents to congress, making the institution nothing more than a rubber stamp. At Díaz's urging, the congress approved amendments that made it possible for him to run for re-election if the population wished him to do so. The constitution was also amended to extend the president's terms for six years. With these reforms, Díaz was successfully re-elected in 1888, 1892, 1898, 1904, and 1910. Díaz also undertook several measures to silence his opposition during this time—he limited freedom of the press, used a reinforced military to put down dissenters and rebellions, and shifted government officials constantly to ensure they did not develop a following that could oppose him. Díaz's undemocratic actions were never challenged by academia as universities acted as a safe haven for the privileged and wealthy, who largely benefited economically under Díaz's rule.

=== The Creelman Interview and potential for regime change ===
The extended rule of Díaz seemed to likely to end in 1908, when, in the Creelman Interview, the dictator announced Mexico was ready for a democracy and that he would not seek re-election. Francisco Madero, a wealthy landowner, took this opportunity to run for the presidency on an anti-re-electionist, pro-democracy platform. Madero, unlike any candidate before him, toured the entire nation advocating for his platform, creating the first modern political campaign in Mexico's history. Díaz, nonetheless, went against his word and also ran for the presidency. Shortly before the elections, Díaz ordered Madero's arrest, and on election day, Díaz won in a landslide. This outraged the vast majority of the population. Madero managed to escape from prison and published the Plan de San Luis Potosí, calling for people to fight to re-instill democratic principles in the nation, thus catalyzing the Mexican Revolution.

== Revolutionary era (1910–1920) ==
The Mexican Revolution saw multiple coups by factions with different visions for the government. Venustiano Carranza gained control of all but two states. This prompted him to call for a congress of Mexico's political class, made up mostly of middle-class reformers to write a new constitution, resulting in the Constitution of 1917. This constitution emphasized that Mexico would be a democratic state, created a bicameral congress, a four-year one-term presidency, and a judicial branch. It also established that states would each elect their own governor and congress to enact local legislation. Carranza, with little opposition, successfully ran to become the first president under this constitution. Álvaro Obregón ran to succeed Carranza, who refused to endorse him and explicitly worked to prevent his presidency. In 1920, Obregón accused Carranza of illicitly using public money to support the candidacy of Ignacio Bonillas, his opponent, and called for Carranza to be deposed. Obregón successfully deposed Carranza, and once elections were held, he won the presidency.

== Post-revolution government (1920–1940) ==
While the Revolution and the Constitution of 1917 established a democratic system to replace Díaz's dictatorship, coups and corruption continued in the two decades following the Revolution.

Amid the Mexican Revolution, the country adopted a constitution that forbids reelection. Álvaro Obregón governed between 1920 and 1924 following the revolution.

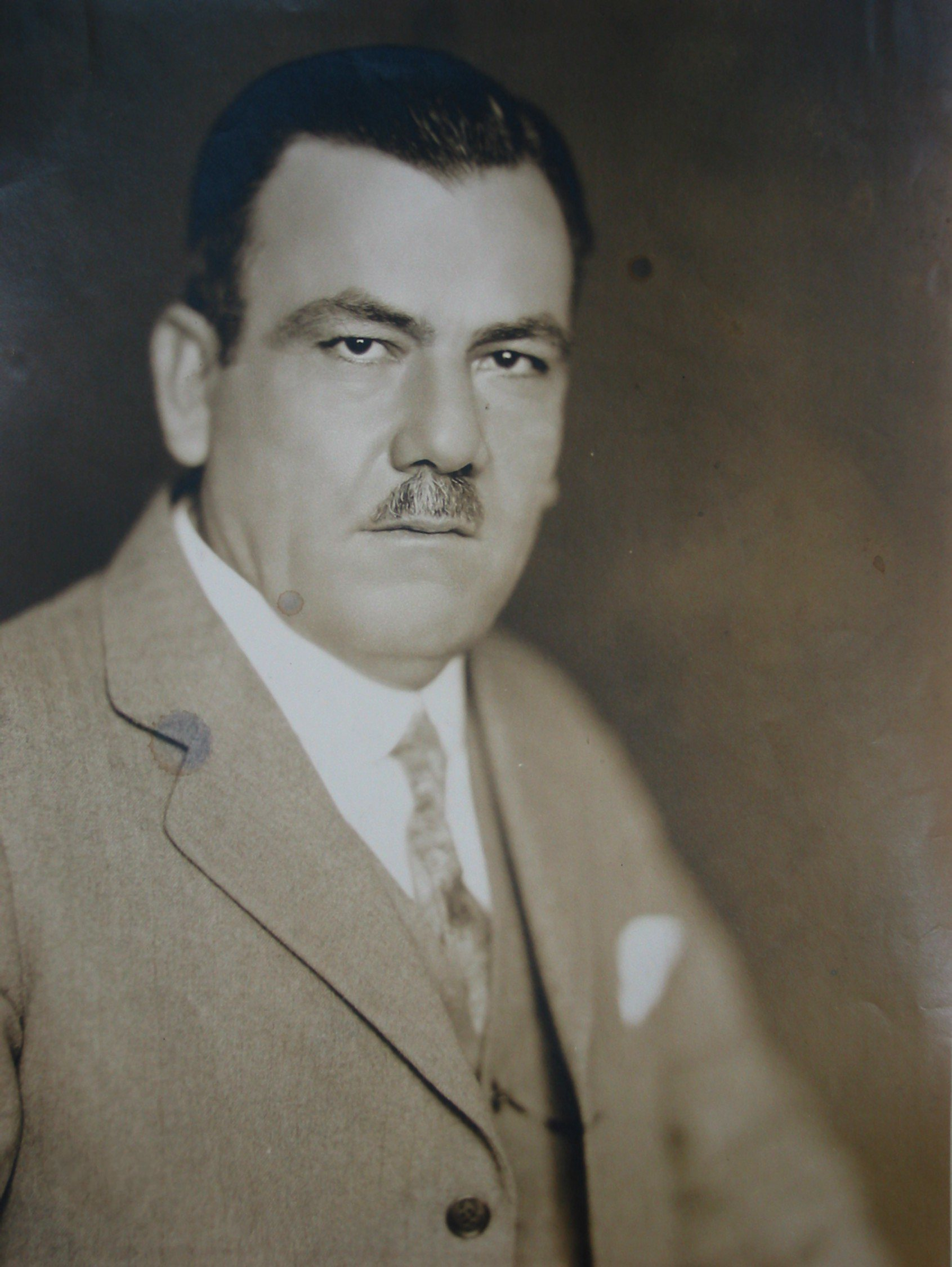
Plutarco Elías Calles, Founder of el Maximato and the PRI

=== Bending rules and the establishment of the Maximato ===
Following Obregón's presidency, a supporter of him, Plutarco Elías Calles, was elected president in the 1924 elections. Despite the constitution's prohibition on re-election, Obregón sought a second term and convinced Calles to change the law in his favor.

During Calles's tenure, the constitution was temporarily amended to allow former presidents to preside in non-consecutive terms. Thus Álvaro Obregón was reelected unopposed in the 1928 election, winning a second term. However, as a consequence of the Cristero War, which was sparked after Plutarco Elías Calles introduced a law that enforced restrictions against the Catholic Church, Obregón was assassinated before he could take office, by José de León Toral on 17 July 1928, 16 days after the election.

As the constitution forbade Calles from being reelected, he could not formally retain the presidency. In a speech, Calles claimed that various politicians had begged him to run for re-election, and he honorably chose not to do so to protect Mexico's institutions and democracy. Calles, however, hand-picked the next three presidents, starting with Emilio Portes Gil, and their cabinets, creating a series of puppet regimes who showed alignment toward Calles in the period that came to be known as the Maximato (1928–1934), in which Calles continued to exercise power and exert influence without holding the presidency. On 4 March 1929, Calles established the primary political party of the country, the Partido Nacional Revolucionario (PNR; National Revolutionary Party), to quell ideological disputes among revolutionaries, and thereby avoid more political crises and violence. It was formed by military personnel, high-level politicians, labor unions, peasant organizations, and members of minor political parties, which indirectly led to a lack of major opposition. The PNR was renamed the Party of the Mexican Revolution (PRM) in 1938 and adopted its current name, the Institutional Revolutionary Party (PRI), in 1946. The party ruled as a de facto one-party state, in which, rather than having the same politicians run for reelection, new presidents were elected with minimal opposition, in what Daniel Cosío Villegas called "six-year-term monarchies," and Mario Vargas Llosa dubbed the "perfect dictatorship." This helped prevent presidents from accumulating too much power, while allowing them to work on their respective projects.

The Maximato ended as a result of the opportunistic actions of Lázaro Cárdenas. When Calles left the country to seek medical attention in the United States, Cárdenas dismissed Callistas (as Calles's supporters were known) from all political posts and exiled Calles' most powerful allies, establishing the first administration independent of Calles's rule in 12 years.

== PRI consolidation of power (1940–1960) ==
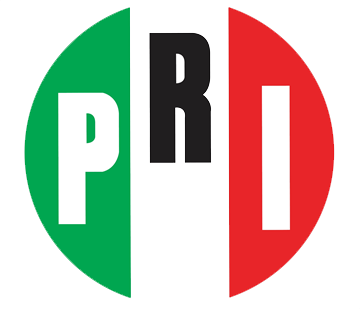
PRI Logo

Cárdenas ended his presidential term in 1940, choosing Manuel Ávila Camacho as his successor, and ensuring his presidential victory over a strong challenger. Ávila Camacho was a political moderate who worked with the U.S. and the Allies during World War II. The relationship brought Mexico economic prosperity during the post-war years as foreign investment returned to Mexico. Economic stability was coupled with the cementing of the PRI's power through the regularization of its undemocratic methods. As a result of the PRI's reliance on a unified citizen elite and that elite's reliance on manipulated elections to legitimize its rule, the regime became one of the most stable and long-lasting in all of Latin America.

During the period it dominated national politics, the PRI lacked checks and balances to ensure fair elections or government transparency. Despite this, numerous cases of corruption were exposed, and the population was affected by the economic crises that followed the Mexican Miracle period (1940–1970). These issues contributed to the strengthening of the opposition, leading to changes in politics.

=== Electoral base and consolidation of legislative control ===
During the Cárdenas administration, the federal government reinforced its role as the third-party enforcer for disputes between labor unions and employers. Rather than focusing on solving labor-employer disputes, the government provided benefits and favorable policies for political loyalty with the unions. This method also secured divisions within the labor movement; but more importantly, it made the labor movement inseparable from the PRI and paved the way for the regularization of governance by consensus. Under this method, the president would individually go to each of the unions that represented the populations in the PRI coalition until a piece of legislation that appeased all parties was negotiated. The legislation was then put through congress, who had already agreed to the legislation and simply acted as a rubber stamp of approval. In exchanging benefits for political loyalty, the PRI ensured that when elections came, an ample majority would turn out in their support and generate constant victories. In addition, in 1951 the PRI oversaw the passage of an Electoral Law that defined political parties as associations with electoral aims responsible for the electorate's civic education and political orientation. The law also increased the minimum number of people required to form a political party from 30,000 to 65,000. These reforms not only guaranteed landslide victories for the PRI, such as in the presidential election of 1970 when the party won 78.9% of the vote, but, according to historian Soledad Loaeza, also underlines the role of minor political parties as integrators of the larger political system rather than a replacement or electoral challenger to the PRI establishment.

=== Control of the Judiciary ===
To ensure the dominance of the president, the PRI also took steps to ensure the Supreme Court would not function as a check on the combined power of the executive and legislative branches. The Supreme Court did not have the power of judicial review and it avoided major involvement in politically sensitive issues to eliminate the possibility of judicial constraints on unconstitutional actions. The twenty-six judges on the court were nominated by the president and approved by a simple majority in the Senate. There were relatively low prerequisites for a nominee to become a judge. According to scholar Pilar Domingo, this subordination, which lasted until a 1994 reform, reflected both the multiplicity of constitutional revisions to the judiciary and the establishment of a judicial career structure that left judges beholden to the ruling party, preventing them from being an independent branch of the government that effectively restrained the executive branch.

=== Emergence of the opposition and pragmatism ===
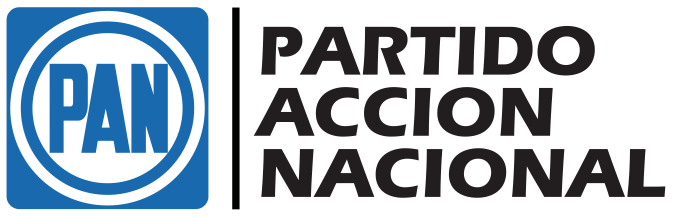
Partido Accion Nacional or PAN – the first opposition party to the PRI

Cárdenas also ushered in the PRI's pragmatic ideological stance. After pursuing significant efforts to redistribute land and overseeing the government appropriation of key industries, the Cárdenas administration faced an economic downturn that prompted a rightward shift in public opinion. During this time, the Partido Acción Nacional (PAN) was created from ex-Callistas who thought the government was overstepping its role in the economy and Catholics who feared the government's secular education policies would bring an end to Catholic schools. Cárdenas, concerned with ensuring a PRI victory and maintaining political stability, did not allow the party to choose the next presidential candidate, opting instead to hand-pick Maneul Ávila Camacho – a right-leaning politician – to run to succeed him. With an appeal to the sentiments of the majority and a weak opposition, Ávila Camacho easily won the presidency. In 1963, under President Adolfo López Mateos, the PRI decided to reform electoral law to allow parties other than the PRI to have representation in Congress: if opposition parties obtained at least 2.5% of the national vote they would receive five deputies. The primary goal of this reform was to channel the energy of dissenters that had emerged from political and economic crises into opposition parties that could still be controlled by the PRI.

The success of Cárdenas's legislative and electoral approaches inspired the following presidents – all from the PRI – to continue the strategies of governing by consensus and choosing a successor based on political pragmatism, not ideological purity. The PRI, thus, established a soft-line authoritarian regime and a one-party dictatorship by only allowing cosmetic opposition with a hegemony so strong it would not be seriously challenged until Vicente Fox's election in 2000. The PAN, according to Soledad Loaeza, a Mexican historian, gave superficial legitimacy to the PRI's rule by taking on the role of the loyal opposition – a party whose dissenters represented a minority political opinion that challenged the dominant party but still functioned within the institutions and norms laid out by the overarching power, never challenging the constitutionality of its actions.

== Protests and reforms (1960–2000) ==
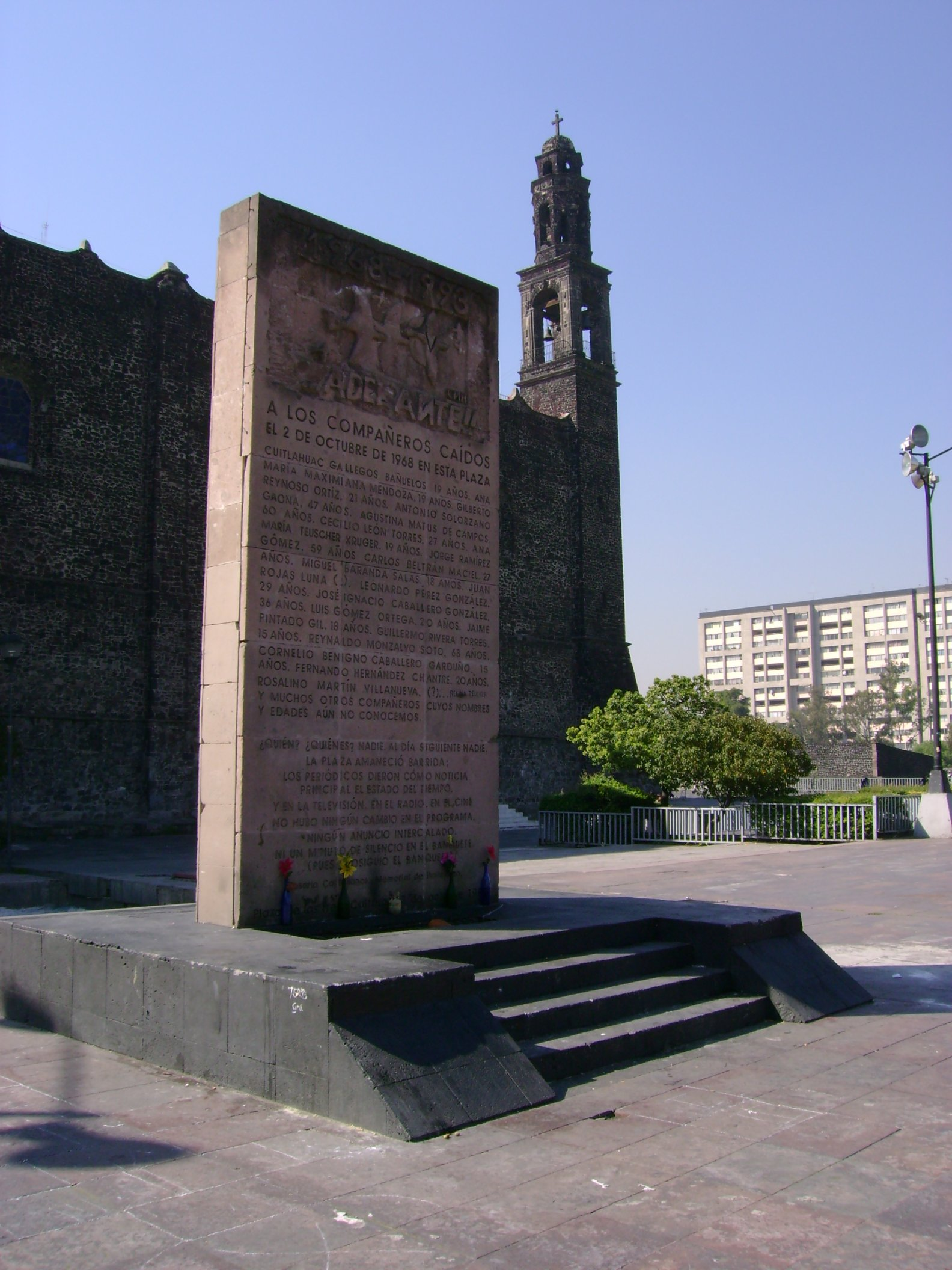
Monument to Tlatelolco Massacre

Student protests for democracy right before the 1968 Mexico City Olympics ended in the Tlatelolco Massacre (Spanish: La Matanza de Tlatelolco), which highlighted the public's discontent with the government. As the calls for more democracy grew, the PRI moved to secure its dominance through brutal oppression and some pro-democratic reforms. This discontent also spurred growth and strengthening among opposition parties as the PRI failed to channel political energy as effectively as before. Sensing this, the party elite guided the PRI towards pro-democratic reforms that would guarantee its dominance while giving the appearance of a move towards true democracy.

A mixed electoral system was introduced by the 1977 political reforms to enable broader representation of opposition parties in an expanded Chamber of Deputies and, in the 1980s and 1990s, further electoral reforms were enacted, including an increased number of proportional-representation deputies for the 1988 general election and the 1990 creation of the Federal Electoral Institute (IFE), responsible of organizing elections, and the Federal Electoral Tribunal (TRIFE), responsible of independently monitor voting irregularities.

Ernesto Zedillo, elected for the PRI in the 1994 election, sought to hold fair elections and refused to endorse a successor candidate, as was customary; as a result, the party chose Francisco Labastida in an open primary instead. The 1996 electoral reform granted full autonomy to the IFE, which guaranteed objectivity and ensured that all competing political parties received equal airtime. In the 2000 general elections, the PRI lost the presidency for the first time in 71 years, and Vicente Fox of the National Action Party (PAN) was elected.

=== Roots of the student protests ===
The administration of Gustavo Díaz Ordaz became notorious for overseeing a significant increase in censorship, arbitrary arrests of political opponents, and extrajudicial executions. On the eve of the Olympics, 10,000 students, housewives, workers, neighborhood groups, and young professionals gathered to protest, calling for an end to police violence, the overwhelming power of the state, the lack of democracy in the nation, political arrests, and for the accountability of those responsible. The protesters were met by severe police repression, resulting in the assassination, wounding, and disappearance of thousands of students. The repression was ordered by Díaz Ordaz and orchestrated by his minister of the interior, Luis Echeverría.

Partido Revolucionario Democratico, established by Cuauhtemoc Cardenas

=== Electoral reforms under Echeverría ===
After being selected as Díaz Ordaz's successor, Echeverría enacted a series of pro-democratic reforms to legitimize his presidency. He incorporated the surviving leaders of the student protests into his government and lowered the voting age to 18. But more importantly, Echeverría oversaw an overhaul of electoral reform which lowered the number of members needed to officially register a new political party, increased the number of seats that would be chosen through proportional representation and lowered the minimum candidacy age—reforms that increased both the number and opportunities for opposition parties.

Despite these reforms, internal fighting in the PAN resulted in José López Portillo, the PRI candidate, running for the presidency unopposed. The PRI during his presidency saw its legitimacy and hegemony diminished, as demonstrated by the success of opposition parties in local elections. Minor opposition parties, such as the Mexican Democratic Party, Socialist Workers' Party, Communist Left Group, Movement for Socialist Action and Unity, Mexican Workers' Party, the Revolutionary Socialist Party, and the Revolutionary Workers' Party emerged in the first half of the 1970s, reflecting the continuation of popular discontent. The 1977 electoral reforms combined with the 1982 economic downturn allowed the conservative PAN to transform into a more relevant political power. It began to win local elections more regularly, obtaining a strong hold over northern Mexico and winning the respect of the public for their pro-democratic and pro-rule of law stances. The PRI reneged on their reforms and refused to honor the victories of the PAN in more isolated districts. The PAN responded to the attempted repressions with mobilizations of their electorate into protests, most notably conducting a hunger strike to protest the gubernatorial elections of Chihuahua in 1986. This in turn lead to the regularization of under the table deals where the PRI gave various concessions to the PAN for their submission. Some scholars, such as Jon Shefner, have attributed the increased push for democratization to the increased globalization of Mexico, noting that democratization was seen as a "cure for the ills of the globalizing economy."

López Portillo chose Miguel de la Madrid as his successor, and his presidency had no significant pro-democratic changes. Yet the federal government's failure to adequately respond to the 1982 economic crisis and the 1985 earthquake enhanced public discontent with the government. When de la Madrid chose Carlos Salinas as his successor, he upset the popular leftist Cuauhtémoc Cárdenas, son of President Lázaro Cárdenas, who expected to be designated the PRI candidate. Cárdenas was thus motivated to leave the PRI and establish the Partido de la Revolución Democrática (PRD) in 1989 as the second significant opposition party to the PRI. On election day, Cárdenas appeared to be approaching victorious, but a breakdown of electronic ballot machines eventually gave Salinas a narrow victory. As the PRD gained electoral power in local elections throughout the 1990s, it adopted the PAN's strategy of using mobilization to extract concessions from the PRI, though their mobilizations were more spontaneous and local compared to their conservative counterparts. The PRI continued to grant concessions, viewing them as the only way to keep their opposition at bay. The first five years of the 1990s saw an increase in the filing of electoral complaints in courts, reflecting more victories for the opposition parties and the PRI's continued attempts to maintain power.

=== Electoral reforms from López Portillo to Salinas ===
Despite the largely anti-democratic nature of national elections during this period, several electoral reforms were enacted to put the country on a pro-democratic route. Under López Portillo in 1977, electoral law was reformed, creating a random selection of citizens to serve at polling places and adding representatives from all political parties to the federal election commission. This law also required political parties to submit a declaration of principles, a program for action and statutes to be recognized as an official political party. Parties also had to obtain at least 1.5% of the national vote or have at least 3,000 members in at least half of the states or at least 300 affiliates in at least half of all single-member electoral districts to be officially recognized. According to Kevin Middlebrook, the regime-sponsored initiative was a response to the liberal and progressive factions within the PRI had become "increasingly convinced" that the regime was suffering a significant erosion, along with the public's shifting evaluations of government success. The public, during this time, had become increasingly discontent with the government's inability to satisfy the historical aspirations of the revolution, such as socioeconomic equity and opportunities for political participation. Only 32.8% of people participated in politics and 89.4% felt there was no freedom to do so. Under de la Madrid in 1987, the federal electoral code was reformed to increase the representation of political parties in the federal election commission and required the results of each polling place to be made public. In 1990 under Salinas, the Federal Code for Electoral Institutions and Procedures (COFIPE) was crafted in response to the chaos and perceived fraud of the 1988 election and was one of the most significant pro-democratic reforms yet. It established the Federal Electoral Institute (IFE) under the direction of the ministry of the interior to organize federal elections. In 1992 COFIPE was reformed, now requiring voters to have a special identification for voting; and in 1993 COFIPE was amended again to regulate the participation of electoral observers.

=== Democracy and the Zapatista uprising ===
Despite the electoral reforms from this period's administration, indigenous populations continued to be marginalized by the government, causing many to channel their frustration into rebellions. After a 1982 economic crisis, the government removed historic protections that limited foreign land ownership, ended agrarian reform, and allowed for the privatization of agrarian resources previously treated as social property. According to George Collier and Jane Collier, "by disbanding credits and infrastructural supports for peasant agriculture, and by phasing out price supports under the terms of NAFTA, the government appeared willing to sacrifice rural producers to unfair competition from imported and subsidized United States crops, particularly corn." Indigenous peasants, especially the coffee producers of Chiapas, recognized this fact. These indigenous populations were regularly subject to the strict rule of indigenous caciques who put them in line with the PRI voting bloc and did not receive the benefits of the clientelist strategy the PRI regularly used to subject its other electoral blocks into compliance, as they were not located in the electorally- and population- rich cities. This led to the creation of the Zapatista Army and the Zapatista Rebellion. June Nash notes that the Zapatistas strove to bring democratic changes by demanding the undelivered land rights of the Constitution of 1917 and the recognition and expansion of distinct indigenous languages and cultural practices, reflecting the lack of full democratic integration of the diverse populations in Mexico. After armed conflict with the Mexican Army, international pressure mounted for the government and the Zapatista Army to reach a peaceful negotiation. Yet Nash notes that in the wake of negotiations, "The Zapatistas, once they agreed to negotiations, thus found themselves being offered the two 'solutions' advocated by transnational capital: 'fair elections' to replace a pact with government, and the 'protection of human rights' both to replace government services and to handle criticisms of the military's role in suppressing domestic unrest." While the government touted the pro-democratic reforms it achieved after the rebellion, the Zapatista Army encouraged their sympathizers to boycott the elections, believing the process could not be trusted, and thus indirectly contributed to local PRI wins. Moreover, while national and state committees on human rights were established, they did not promote the autonomy of indigenous communities or the interpretation of human rights to include economic and social principles as the Zapatistas wanted, creating a stalemate in negotiations. The Zapatista Rebellion, in short, highlighted the lack of democratic integration of the historically marginalized indigenous groups of Mexico.

=== Electoral reforms from Zedillo to present ===
Under Ernesto Zedillo, the PRI enacted further pro-democratic reforms. In 1994 COFIPE was amended to increase the weight of citizen councilors on the IFE's general council; in 1996 it was reformed again, this time to make the IFE an autonomous institution run by citizens, and to create the Federal Electoral Court as a specialized branch of the judiciary. In 1994 Zedillo also oversaw significant reforms to the Supreme Court. These reforms reduced the twenty-six judges back to eleven as the 1917 Constitution originally mandated, increased the requirements to become a candidate by requiring candidates to have at least ten years of legal experience, allowed the Senate to pick the nominee from a list of three candidates presented by the presidency, submitted candidates to face interviews with the Senate, required nominees to obtain two-thirds of Senate approval before being approved, and reduced judges' life tenure to staggered fifteen-year terms. Most importantly, however, the reforms gave the Supreme Court the power to resolve disputes and check laws for their constitutionality, effectively giving them the power of judicial review and paved the way for the Supreme Court to be a counterbalance to the executive and legislative branches. In 2002, an electoral reform was passed requiring at least 30% of all the candidates for all political parties to be women, but exemptions are made for parties that select candidates by primary election.

== Decline of PRI (2000–2018) ==
The PRI's removal from the presidency in 2000 marked a major step in Mexico's democratic transition. Other democratic reforms during this period included the creation of independent checks-and-balances institutions and the adoption of laws, including the Federal Law on Transparency and Access to Information (IFAI), the Superior Auditor of the Federation (ASF), the National Council for the Evaluation of Social Development Policy (CONEVAL), and more independence to the National Institute of Statistics and Geography (INEGI), among others.

However, Fox's presidency was undermined by gridlock in Congress, a lack of institutional reforms, and an inability to curb corruption. Fox continued the PRI's neoliberal economic policies and failed to reduce social inequality. His successor, Felipe Calderón, launched the war on drug trafficking in Mexico, in which he sent the army to fight against cartels. Additionally, his actions were aimed at gaining legitimacy and demonstrating that he had the support of the military. However, the war contributed to an increase in violence and weakened the state.

As a consequence, public disillusionment over the PAN's failure to fulfill its promises allowed the PRI to regain power under Enrique Peña Nieto in the 2012 elections. His administration was mired in corruption scandals and human rights violations, including media censorship, the Tlatlaya massacre, and the Iguala mass kidnapping, plus introducing ineffective reforms. In 2018, Peña Nieto's last year as president, the Bertelsmann Transformation Index (BTI) reported that Mexico was undergoing a process of democratic regression. Similarly, The Economist's Democracy Index defined Mexico as a flawed democracy in the same year.

Negative perceptions of the PRI and the PAN, combined with the rise of populism in the 2010s, led the public to seek a third alternative.

=== Zedillo administration and the election of the PAN ===
Zedillo's administration saw the crumbling of governance by consensus. Additionally, the president's refusal to name his successor and intervene in the elections in favor of the PRI like his predecessors triggered the destabilization of the PRI's formula for electoral success. This led to the election of the first non-PRI president, Vicente Fox of the PAN. Some scholars, such as Enrique Krauze, Steven Barracca, and Lorenzo Meyer viewed Fox's election as the consolidation of democracy. Meyer, in light of the election, believed that there was "a good chance of going from authoritarianism to something that I hope is going to be democracy without the traumatic experience of the past-without repeating ourselves." According to Krauze, "The 2000 presidential election was Mexico's first truly democratic national contest in a century, and the victory of Vicente Fox...put an end to 71 years of oligarchic rule by the PRI." Yet other scholars did not view Fox's election in such a positive light, as the election of Fox did not mark the end of the PRI's overwhelming influence. Since the PRI continued to dominate the legislature, the PAN was forced to cooperate with them. A number of shared interests developed between the two parties, leading the public to nickname the coalition the "PRIAN".

=== PAN retains the presidency ===
The 2006 election was heavily contested between Felipe Calderón, the PAN candidate, and Andrés Manuel López Obrador (often abbreviated as "AMLO"), the PRD candidate. The extremely tight race resulted in Calderón's victory; however, López Obrador made a series of allegations claiming there were significant irregularities in the election, including a favorable intervention for Calderón orchestrated by President Fox, voter intimidation and ballot-box stuffing. While López Obrador's base vehemently accused the PAN of tampering with the elections, the Federal Electoral Tribunal determined there had been no wrong-doing and that the elections were valid. Despite that, López Obrador proclaimed himself the "legitimate president" and held an inauguration for himself. Scholars, such as Jorge Castañeda, argue that the presence of national and international observers and a special prosecutor, along with the counting of votes by hand before party representatives and the series of electoral reforms from the 1980s and 1990s made it "virtually impossible" for there to be electoral wrongdoing. Castañeda does note that this does not mean the elections were equitable, arguing that certain elements skewed the elections in Calderón's favor, including national broadcasts extolling the Fox administration's accomplishments, a series of statements from the president of the perils of "changing horses while crossing the river", and Calderón's ads comparing López Obrador to Venezuelan populist president Hugo Chávez. The advertisements, purchased by the Business Coordinating Council, as well as PAN social welfare programs benefiting the poor, all favored the incumbent party in the election.

Despite Calderón's presidency representing the second non-PRI administration since 1910, Mexicans remained largely unsatisfied with the progress of their democracy, namely due to economic malaise and the disapproval of incumbents. Drug cartel violence exploded under Calderón, as he declared war on the cartels. Many have viewed the crisis during Calderón's presidency as "the explosion of a long and historic negligence of the Mexican authorities to make the changes necessary to prevent a crisis of public security of this magnitude." Cartel-related instability resulted largely from the PRI's historic agreements with drug cartels. The PRI had long-established mutually beneficial agreements with cartels, with politicians on the municipal, state, and national level taking a lenient stance towards cartels in exchange for bribes. The election of both Fox and Calderón had upset the delicate balance and long-term agreements that had held steady during the era of the PRI's era of unchallenged rule.

=== Return of the PRI and transition to López Obrador and MORENA ===
MORENA logo

Because of Calderón's ineffective policies towards drug cartels, many people hoped that the election of a PRI candidate would reinstate the relative peace that had existed prior to the PAN's rule. This helped lead to the election of Enrique Peña Nieto, the PRI candidate in 2012. Yet contrary to expectations, tensions with drug mafias did not subside, and the general incompetency of the administration significantly increased popular discontent.

This discontent manifested in the election of López Obrador in 2018, the National Regeneration Movement (MORENA) candidate, marking the first election of a left-wing candidate and the first presidential candidate to officially win a majority of the vote in Mexico's history. According to César Cansino, López Obrador's administration is the most turbulent in memory, but one not characterized by in-fighting like that within the PRI, as with previous turmoil, but by heightened calls for democracy.

== Morena (2018–present) ==
Andrés Manuel López Obrador (AMLO) competed in the 2006 and 2012 elections. He alleged that there were several irregularities and the IFE helped to commit fraud during both elections and initially refused to accept the results. In opinion of Adam Przeworski, democracies require the losing side to accept the results. Todd A. Eisenstadt and Alejandro Poiré argue that, despite lacking solid evidence of electoral fraud, AMLO undermined public trust in the country's electoral system, leading to questions about the independence of its electoral authorities.

Following both defeats, López Obrador founded the National Regeneration Movement civil association, which later became a political party in 2014, Morena. He won the 2018 elections, after basing his campaign on promises of an agenda of social justice, anti-corruption measures, economic reform, transparency, and accountability. Kevin Zapata Celestino considers that the victory is the result of a "stalled" democratization process from 2000 to 2018.

Once elected, AMLO openly attacked those he considered adversaries during his conferences, including journalists. According to a study of the Human Rights Center of the University of Berkeley, during his term there were 75 reports of "incidents of killings, enforced disappearances, and other grave physical violence against journalists". Several of them, whose reports covered topics such as organized crime, government accountability, or disappearances, had already reported the threats to the authorities and were under federal protection. During his administration, the use of surveillance tools such as Pegasus spyware to spy on journalists increased. AMLO attempted to create an electoral reform to change electoral institutes, a move seen in autocratic societies. Among these reforms were proposals to allow electoral authorities to be elected and to reduce the number of legislators and senators. According to Andrea Kendall-Taylor and Erica Franz, the first step to erode democracy is to "install loyalists in key positions of power". Lisdey Espinoza Pedraza says that it was common during the PRI era to "reward loyalty over competence and prioritize political control over institutional reform".

In June 2021 midterm elections, López Obrador's left-leaning Morena's coalition lost seats in the lower house of Congress. However, his ruling coalition maintained a simple majority, but López Obrador failed to secure the two-thirds congressional supermajority. The main opposition was a coalition of Mexico's three traditional parties: the center-right Revolutionary Institutional Party, right-wing National Action Party and leftist Party of the Democratic Revolution.

During his presidency, López Obrador prioritized clientelism to gain electoral support and political dependency. He also influenced the Supreme Court of Mexico to some degree to serve his political interests, despite the constitution requires a separation of powers. Analysts have viewed the 2024 judicial reform as a pivotal moment that accelerated democratic backsliding. The reform allows citizens to elect judges by popular vote. Consequently, it could lead to judges being corrupted into serving the interests of Morena politicians or those of criminal organizations. Additionally, several independent checks-and-balances institutions were dissolved, mainly those responsible for transparency and market competition, and were merged into government agencies. (Note: The dissolved agencies included the Federal Economic Competition Commission (COFECE), the Federal Telecommunications Institute (IFT), the National Institute of Transparency for Access to Information and Personal Data Protection (INAI), the National Council for the Evaluation of Social Development Policy (CONEVAL), the Energy Regulation Commission (CRE), the National Hydrocarbons Commission (CNH), and the National Commission for Continuous Improvements in Education (MEJOREDU). A bid to replace the National Electoral Institute with a National Institute of Elections and Consultation was defeated in Congress.)

Many of these reforms and changes were reflected in The Economist's 2021 Democracy Index, which reclassified Mexico from a flawed democracy to a hybrid regime. The country was downgraded from "mostly free" to "low freedom", while its ranking in the Prosperity Index increased in 2024; legal freedom dropped from 54 to 48.6 points; judicial independence dropped from 62.2 to 50.4 points; and political freedom dropped from 65.4 to 55.4 points.

López Obrador lacked a supermajority during his tenure, but his successor, Claudia Sheinbaum, obtained it during the 2024 election following an interpretation of laws rather than the popular vote. Upon taking office in October, she became the first woman to lead the country in Mexico's history. She was sworn in as Mexico's president on 1 October 2024. She promised continuity for AMLO's platform. In the opinion of Javier Martín-Reyes, Sheinbaum's reforms significantly increased democratic erosion after assuming position. She organized the 2025 judicial elections, in which nine Supreme Court judges with a Morena background were elected, in one of the lowest turnouts in the history of the country. She called for a recall election to be held in 2027, coinciding with the legislative elections. Opposition members saw this as an attempt to get her name on the ballot so that her popularity would rub off on her political party, which was already beginning to lose support. The 2026 BTI Index ranked Sheinbaum's administration as "illiberal", describing the Morena regime as "slowly advancing [from an] imperfect democracy to one that more closely resembles what existed during the years of hegemonic control under the [PRI]".

== Current challenges ==
=== Fragility of democracy and rule of law ===
With the 2018 election of López Obrador, Mexico's recent democratic gains have proven a paradigm change. However, the independence of the INE is not guaranteed as it is a legacy institution that operated the two electoral fraud periods. However, some regime-supported voices like Enrique Krauze contends that López Obrador is an "elected despot", similar to Venezuela's late President Hugo Chávez. He sees López Obrador as illegitimately blending the executive, the legislative, and the judiciary "into a single power that distorts the truth and appropriates history". The judiciary was becoming more independent of the executive, but those changes have been reversed under López Obrador. In September 2024, with the decisive vote of the Senate, the controversial judicial reform advocated by López Obrador, which allows citizens to elect judges, including those of the supreme court, has been approved. Supreme Court Chief Justice Norma Lucía Piña Hernández warned that the reform could "generate tension between judges' duty to be independent and impartial and their need to make rulings which are popular in order to attract votes". At the end of October 2024, eight out of 11 supreme court justices announced their resignations, effective from November to August, in protest against recent judicial reform.

In Krauze's assessment, López Obrador has accumulated far more power than any previous president of Mexico and that currently "there is no political force that can compete with him," given the ruin of the PRI, lack of leadership within the PAN, and nonexistence of political power of the other opposition parties. A multiparty system began emerging in 1997, when the PRI failed to win a legislative majority in the lower house.

The National Institute for Access to Information and Data Protection (INAI), created in 2003 to ensure transparency in government spending, has had its funding cut and is at risk of complete elimination. Although López Obrador was elected with promises to the electorate to end corruption, contracts are now awarded with no oversight to companies owned by the president's friends.

Despite promising "to return the Army back to their barracks", the army has acquired an ever-increasing role during the presidency of López Obrador. With the motivation that the army can help to more effectively fight organized crime and also corruption within the public administration, the armed forces and even the navy have enjoyed extensive privileges in Mexico in the awarding of public contracts, not only in sectors related to military supplies, but also in transport and tourism. This has led to a growing influence in the political sphere, which has been criticized by representatives of the various movements in defense of human rights, and which has highlighted the contradiction, above all, with the electoral promise to shed full light on the disappearance of the 43 students of Ayotzinapa. Despite an investigation by the judiciary, López Obrador denied any involvement of the military.

=== Primary election participation ===
Kathleen Bruhn argues that democratic methods to choose candidates in primaries elect less radical candidates than non-democratic methods, not because voters pick candidates who reflect the positions of the electorate the most, but because the process encourages the election of candidates who are acceptable to multiple internal factions of the party. Bruhn notes that the primary system in Mexico specifically varies across and within political parties – as of 2006, the PAN uses primaries to select 52% of their candidates while the PRD uses them to choose 36% of them. The PRI does not use primaries at all.

The PAN only allows active members to participate in its primaries, and to become an active member, one must be nominated by a previous member, take courses on the party doctrine, and serve as apprentices. This leads to 33% of potential electors per 1000 registered voters being represented in the PAN primaries. The PRD, conversely, has fewer barriers – one must be an official party member to participate in the primaries, but the time between party membership and voting in the primaries is short. This results in 97.5% of potential electors per 1000 registered voters being represented in the primaries. Thus, the selection of candidates is not fully democratic for any party, and some barriers exist to full citizenry participation.

=== Clientelism ===
Clientelism continues to have a lasting legacy in Mexico. Some scholars, such as Alberto Olvera, dispute the effectiveness of the most recent wave of reforms to reduce clientelism. Olvera contends that Mexico's "transition to democracy has not been completed in terms of either the destitution of the authoritarian regime or the establishment of a democratic regime, a situation that explains the continuity of authoritarian practices and culture in public life.

Not only did the Partido Revolucionario Institucional preserve impressive veto power over constitutional reforms and even small changes in matters of public policy, but also the other two main political parties (Partido Acción Nacional and Partido de la Revolución Democrática) had no alternative democratic projects and reproduced the clientelistic and particularistic political culture of the past; civil society was (and is) both socially and politically weak, and its popular sectors suffered important strategic defeats along the process."

According to Olvera, PRD politicians use clientelism not only because of its entrenchment or the high rates of poverty in Mexico but also because of the limited institutionalization of its internal democratic rules. When the PRD first became a party, it merged various left-wing activists, parties, and social movements with diverse views. The emergence of Cuauhtémoc Cárdenas as a predominant leader set the party on a pattern of having personalistic factions and centralized power. Because most of the resources were focused on elections rather than institutionalizing party rules, each faction continued to pursue its own goals and leadership alliances and factions battled over voters, creating clientelistic tenancies.

As of 2004, there were reported instances of ballot-box stuffing, ballot-box theft, vote buying, membership list inflation, and member deletion in internal elections of the PRD. Similarly, PRI electoral machines continue to work strongly in local elections, carrying the legacy of clientelism and extralegal deals from the PRI's earlier days. The only way to remedy the simultaneous over-politicization of democratic systems and depoliticization of public life that have resulted, according to Olvera, is for new social and political actors to emerge.

=== Electoral court ===
While various reforms have established institutions and an electoral court to prevent electoral fraud, Todd Eisenstadt contends that these institutions have not extended their influence to the fullest level. State- and local-level progress to make elections credible has been slower as PRI machines are still working strong despite opposition wins at the national level. The expensive and autonomous electoral institutions are ignored when they are the most needed in post-electoral conflicts – in 13% of all local elections between 1988 and 2001 and 15% of local elections from 1989 to 2000, opposition parties and incumbents negotiate extralegal bargains to resolve their disputes instead of submitting legal complaints.

While local political bosses (also known as caciques) can defy local formal electoral institutions in their zones of influence, the informal bargaining institutions in which they reach agreements are subject to presidential discretion. This informal system, thus, has created an uphill battle for the establishment of transparency in local elections.

=== Anti-re-electionist principle and campaign finance ===
The anti-re-electionist principle, which holds that politicians should only stand for one term, continues to be a point of contention among scholars and the populace. Some scholars, such as conservative Jorge Castañeda, have criticized the anti-re-electionist principle as they argue candidates are made more likely to subject themselves to voters' will when re-election is at play.

Similarly, Alberto Olvera of the Universidad Veracruzana argued that this principle also means the legislative and executive powers cannot develop cycles of professionalization and specialization, the political class has become beholden to a few governors, the president, and some de facto powers who manage their careers. The anti-re-election principle has also generated significant electoral system and campaign costs, creating a dependency on those who finance campaigns. Castañeda argues that inequality in campaign financing continues to result in inequality of air time and ad time like in the 2006 election and thus continues to make the exposure of candidates and elections unequal today.

Nonetheless, other scholars have seen this principle as a way to prevent repeating the mistakes of dictatorial pasts. Enrique Krauze is concerned that López Obrador might be tempted to challenge the principle, given his charismatic as well as constitutional power. The topic of re-elections and their effects on accountability continues to be a contentious topic in Mexican politics.

=== Gender equality in representation ===
A 2002 electoral reform established gender quotas for all political parties, excepting parties that select candidates via primaries. Lisa Baldez argues that in times of electoral uncertainty, gender quotas allow for internal party reform, which parties can exploit in campaigns to appear more democratic. Courts play a central role in the interpretation of these laws so that, without independent courts, the law can be interpreted in a way favoring the party with the most control.

The results of this law are mixed, although it did lead to a notable increase in female representation in the 2003 midterms, where women won 23% of the seats up in that election, a 7% increase from the previous midterms. The IFE did not hold parties accountable to a specific definition of what counted as primary elections, diluting the full potential of the effect of the gender quota implementation. The PRI and PAN especially used primaries to avoid the gender quota, and the IFE did not closely scrutinize the variance among primaries. Baldez argues that this highlights that progress in implementation can and should be made for the sake of having more equitable policies.

=== Effects of electoral manipulation on voter turnout ===
Historically, in Mexico and elsewhere, electoral manipulation has been associated with discouraged voters and lowered voter turnout. This was especially true during the peak of the PRI's rule. Scholars believed that turnout would increase after the electoral reforms of the 1990s. However, while electoral manipulation has decreased as a result of these reforms, aggregate turnout in elections has remained stagnant – it averaged 58.5% in the six elections prior to 1991 and 58.1% in the seven elections in 1991–2009 according to Alberto Simpser. His study finds that "each percentage point of the vote that the PRI added to its total via manipulation in the pre-reform period was associated with a 1.7% to 2.4% decrease in the pre-reform level of voter (true) turnout."

Moreover, it notes that there is a significant discrepancy between true turnout and turnout figures, as self-reported turnout figures regularly inflate turnout rates to paint a better picture of elections. Simpser, professor and chair of the Political Science Department at the Autonomous Technological Institute of Mexico, also emphasizes that a failure to detect turnout anomalies does not equate with a lack of wrongdoing because of this misreporting, and warns electoral manipulation likely continues today.

=== Political violence ===
- List of politicians killed in the Mexican drug war
- List of politicians killed during the presidency of Claudia Sheinbaum
- List of politicians killed during the 2024 Mexican elections
- List of politicians killed during the presidency of Andrés Manuel López Obrador
- List of journalists and media workers killed in Mexico

== Current Elected Federal Offices ==
=== President ===
The president is elected by popular vote at the national level and serves one six-year term. They hold the sole power of the Executive branch, and serve as the Chief of State and the Army.

=== Congress ===
The National Congress is bicameral. It is required to hold two ordinary sessions per year – the first of which begins on 1 September and lasts until 15 December of the same year (unless it is the year a new president takes office) and the second of which begins on 1 February and ends on 30 April. A standing committee composed of 19 members of the Lower Chamber and 18 of the Upper Chamber has the sole power to call extraordinary sessions.

==== Lower Chamber ====
The Chamber of Deputies is composed of 500 deputies who each serve a three-year term. Each state and Mexico City is allocated a number of representatives proportional to their population. 300 of the deputies are elected by majority vote from single-member districts in their respective states. The remaining 200 are elected via proportional representation party lists. For this process, the nation is divided into five regions that combine multiple states, and each region is given 40 deputies. To earn representation through this proportional voting portion, parties must earn at least 2% of the total votes. Moreover, parties may not win more than 215 seats and thus may not hold an absolute majority.

==== Upper Chamber ====
The Senate is composed of 128 members who each serve a six-year term. Each state elects three senators – two of these are allocated through a relative majority and the third seat is given according to the first minority principle, meaning it is given to the party that earned the second largest number of votes. The remaining 32 seats are appointed through a proportional representation system according to the voter rolls at a national level, and the natural quotient and largest remainder electoral formulas are used.

== See also ==
- Politics in Mexico
- Censorship in Mexico
- Elections in Mexico
- National Electoral Institute
- Federal Electoral Tribunal
- Political parties in México
- Constitution of 1812
- Sentiments of the Nation (1813)
- Congress of Chilpancingo
- Creole nationalism
- Solemn Act of the Declaration of Independence of Northern America
- Mexican War of Independence
- Constitution of Apatzingán (1814)
- Plan of Iguala 1821
- Mexico Constitution of 1824
- Constitution of 1857
- Mexican Revolution
- Plan of San Luis Potosí
- Constitution of 1917
- Institutional Revolutionary Party PRI
- National Action Party (Mexico) PAN
- Tlatelolco massacre
- Party of the Democratic Revolution PRD
- National Regeneration Movement MORENA
