= 8th federal electoral district of Baja California =

Federal electoral district of Mexico

Baja California's 8th
- Electoral district of the Chamber of Deputies of Mexico

Incumbent
- Member: Fausto Gallardo García
- Party: ▌Morena
- Congress: 66th (2024–2027)

District
- State: Baja California
- Head town: Tijuana
- Coordinates: 32°31′N 117°02′W
- Covers: Tijuana (part)
- PR region: First
- Precincts: 229
- Population: 429,514 (2020 census)

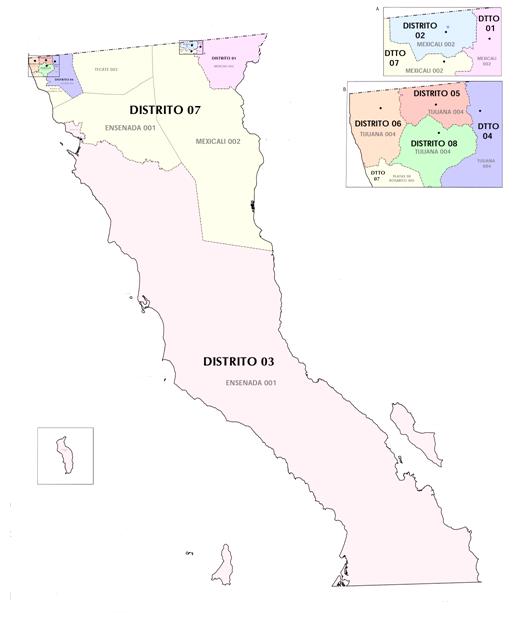
Baja California under the 2017–2022 districting scheme

Baja California's districts between 2005 and 2017

The 8th federal electoral district of Baja California (Spanish: Distrito electoral federal 08 de Baja California) is one of the 300 electoral districts into which Mexico is divided for elections to the federal Chamber of Deputies and one of nine such districts in the state of Baja California.

It elects one deputy to the lower house of Congress for each three-year legislative session by means of the first-past-the-post system. Votes cast in the district also count towards the calculation of proportional representation ("plurinominal") deputies elected from the first region.

The 8th district was created by the Federal Electoral Institute (IFE) in its 2005 redistricting process and was first contested in the 2006 general election. The current member for the district, elected in the 2024 general election, is Fausto Gallardo García of the National Regeneration Movement (Morena).

== District territory ==
In its 2023 districting plan, which is to be used for the 2024, 2027 and 2030 federal elections, the National Electoral Institute (INE) increased Baja California's seat allocation from eight to nine. The 8th district covers 229 precincts (secciones electorales) in the south of the urban core of the municipality of Tijuana. (Note: The 4th, 5th and 6th districts cover the remainder of the city.)

The head town (cabecera distrital), where results from individual polling stations are gathered together and tallied, is the city of Tijuana. The district reported a population of 429,514 in the 2020 census.

== Previous districting schemes ==
Evolution of electoral district numbers
	1974	1978	1996	2005	2017	2023
Baja California	3	6	6	8	8	9
Chamber of Deputies	196	300				

2017–2022

Between 2017 and 2022, the 8th district covered 249 precincts in the south of the urban core of the municipality of Tijuana. The head town was at Tijuana.

2005–2017

From 2005 to 2017, the district comprised the rural portion of the municipality of Tijuana, together with the neighbouring municipality of Playas del Rosarito.

== Deputies returned to Congress ==
(Mexico) National parties
- Current
- PAN
- PRI
- PT
- PVEM
- MC
- Morena
- PAZ
- Somos
- Defunct or local only
- PLM
- PNR
- PRM
- PNM
- PP
- PPS
- PARM
- PFCRN
- CON
- PANAL
- PSD
- PES
- PES
- PRD

Baja California's 8th district
Election	Deputy	Party	Term	Legislature
2006	Mirna Cecilia Rincón Vargas	National Action Party (Mexico)	2006–2009	60th Congress
2009	Óscar Martín Arce Paniagua	National Action Party (Mexico)	2009–2012	61st Congress
2012	Mayra Karina Robles Aguirre	Institutional Revolutionary Party	2012–2015	62nd Congress
2015	Jacqueline Nava Mouett	National Action Party (Mexico)	2015–2018	63rd Congress
2018	Héctor René Cruz Aparicio	Social Encounter Party	2018–2021	64th Congress
2021	Fausto Gallardo García	Ecologist Green Party of Mexico	2021–2024	65th Congress
2024	Fausto Gallardo García	Ecologist Green Party of Mexico	2024–2027	66th Congress

== Presidential elections ==
Baja California's 8th district
Election	District won by	Party or coalition	%
2018	Andrés Manuel López Obrador	Juntos Haremos Historia	70.6182
2024	Claudia Sheinbaum Pardo	Sigamos Haciendo Historia	74.2527
