= Opinion polling for the 2027 Mexican legislative election =

This is a list of public opinion polls relating to the 2027 Mexican legislative election.

== Graphical summary ==
The chart below shows opinion polls conducted since the 2024 general election. The trend lines are local regressions (LOESS). The bar on the left represents the previous election, and the bar on the right represents the date of the next election.

== Voting intention ==
=== 2026 ===
Date(s) conducted	Pollster	Sample size	PAN	PRI	PVEM	PT	MC	Morena	PAZ	SOMOS	Others	None	Und./ no ans.	Lead
23–26 Oct	De las Heras Demotecnia (Note: Responses indicating non-participation ("No iría a votar") are grouped under "None." Non-responses or ambiguous choices ("Es secreto" and "Cualquiera") are grouped under "Undecided/no answer.")	1,000	9.0	7.0	4.0	2.0	6.0	45.0	1.0	1.0	–	11.0	14.0	36.0
20–22 Oct	LaEncuesta.MX	5,000	19.2	10.1	4.4	2.4	10.3	43.6	1.1	2.6	0.6	–	5.7	24.4
27–29 Sep	LaEncuesta.MX	5,000	17.1	14.2	4.9	2.8	12.3	41.2	1.3	1.0	1.1	–	4.1	24.1
10–15 Sep; 17–20 Sep	El Financiero	800	8.0	6.0	2.0	1.0	5.0	46.0	0.0	1.0	–	14.0	17.0	38.0
28–30 Aug	LaEncuesta.MX	5,000	18.7	13.4	4.8	3.2	11.5	37.6	1.8	1.4	1.5	–	6.1	18.9
25–29 Aug	Enkoll	1,205	12.0	8.0	3.0	2.0	12.0	41.0	–	1.0	1.0	7.0	13.0	29.0
20–26 Aug	Buendía & Márquez	1,000	11.0	9.0	5.0	2.0	9.0	35.0	0.0	1.0	–	–	28.0	24.0
13–16 Aug	Mitofsky	1,200	14.8	10.4	5.6	2.7	9.8	33.4	0.5	0.9	2.5	–	19.4	18.6
11 Aug	Statistical Research Corporation	1,000	14.5	10.2	3.5	2.2	9.0	45.5	–	–	6.1	–	9.0	31.0
1–5 Aug	Parametría	800	10.0	8.0	5.0	4.0	10.0	36.0	–	–	1.0	15.0	11.0	26.0
24–26 Jul	LaEncuesta.MX	5,000	17.9	11.9	5.4	3.4	10.7	38.6	1.7	2.1	1.2	–	7.1	20.7
19–24 Jun	Gobernarte	1,500	15.5	11.4	2.6	5.2	4.5	46.9	Did not exist		–	13.8	–	31.4
6–8 Jun	De las Heras Demotecnia	1,000	9.0	9.0	5.0	2.0	7.0	44.0	Did not exist		–	9.0	13.0	35.0
9–31 May	Varela y Asociados (Note: Conducted via direct questioning without the use of a physical ballot or voting box.)	873	9.0	8.0	3.0	1.0	5.0	27.0	Did not exist		3.0	25.0	19.0	18.0
15–21 May	Buendía & Márquez	1,000	11.0	10.0	6.0	3.0	9.0	39.0	Did not exist		–	–	22.0	28.0
16–19 May	Enkoll	1,207	12.0	8.0	5.0	1.0	12.0	39.0	Did not exist		–	11.0	12.0	27.0
7–12 May	Becerra Mizuno y Asociados (Note: Party percentages are based on decided voters only. The total, including others/none/undecided/no answer, will exceed 100%.)	800	18.0	13.0	9.0	4.0	15.0	41.0	Did not exist		–	–	18.0	23.0
27 Apr – 2 May	Electoralia	2,500	19.0	7.0	1.0	1.0	9.0	45.0	Did not exist		–	–	18.0	26.0
9 Apr	Statistical Research Corporation	1,000	13.8	10.5	1.4	1.3	11.7	49.1	Did not exist		4.1	–	8.1	35.3
25–30 Mar	Electoralia	2,500	20.0	6.0	1.0	1.0	9.0	46.0	Did not exist		–	–	16.0	26.0
12–28 Mar	Varela y Asociados	1,080	11.0	9.0	3.0	2.0	7.0	29.0	Did not exist		3.0	22.0	15.0	18.0
26–28 Feb	Enkoll	1,210	14.0	7.0	3.0	2.0	9.0	42.0	Did not exist		–	12.0	11.0	28.0
28 Feb	Statistical Research Corporation	1,000	17.9	7.0	3.8	1.7	13.7	40.9	Did not exist		6.7	–	8.3	23.0
12–17 Feb	Buendía & Márquez	1,000	14.0	8.0	7.0	3.0	12.0	34.0	Did not exist		–	–	22.0	20.0
13–18 Jan	Gobernarte	1,500	11.3	9.8	1.0	3.0	8.7	49.3	Did not exist		16.9	–	–	38.0

=== 2025 ===
Date(s) conducted	Pollster	Sample size	PAN	PRI	PVEM	PT	MC	Morena	Others	None	Und./ no ans.	Lead
24 Nov	Statistical Research Corporation	1,000	15.9	6.8	2.1	3.0	11.5	46.0	6.4	–	8.3	30.1
19 Oct	Statistical Research Corporation	1,000	12.2	7.8	3.1	2.3	8.2	45.8	4.1	–	16.5	33.6
24–26 Sep	Enkoll	1,019	11.0	5.0	3.0	3.0	9.0	48.0	–	12.0	9.0	37.0
8–12 Sep	Varela y Asociados	600	15.0	6.0	1.0	2.0	11.0	40.0	1.0	8.0	16.0	25.0
14–19 Aug	Buendía & Márquez	1,000	11.0	8.0	4.0	3.0	8.0	45.0	–	–	21.0	34.0
5–9 Jun; 19–23 Jun	El Financiero	1,000	9.0	8.0	2.0	2.0	5.0	51.0	4.0	12.0	7.0	42.0
15–20 May	Buendía & Márquez	1,000	10.0	9.0	5.0	3.0	9.0	43.0	–	–	21.0	33.0
26 Mar – 1 Apr	Becerra Mizuno y Asociados	800	11.0	10.0	8.0	4.0	12.0	55.0	–	–	18.0	43.0
13–18 Feb	Buendía & Márquez	1,000	7.0	8.0	5.0	3.0	10.0	46.0	–	–	21.0	36.0

== See also ==
- Opinion polling for the 2024 Mexican general election
- Opinion polling on the Sheinbaum presidency
