= Indigenous rights =

Legal, social, or ethical principles pertaining to indigenous peoples

Indigenous rights are those rights that exist in recognition of the specific condition of indigenous peoples. This includes not only the most basic human rights of physical survival and integrity, but also the rights over their land (including native title), language, religion, and other elements of cultural heritage that are a part of their existence and identity as a people. This can be used as an expression for advocacy of social organizations, or form a part of the national law in establishing the relation between a government and the right of self-determination among its indigenous people, or in international law as a protection against violation of indigenous rights by actions of governments or groups of private interests.

== Definition and historical background ==
Indigenous rights belong to those who, being indigenous peoples, are defined by being the original people of a land that has been conquered and colonized by outsiders.

Exactly who is a part of the indigenous peoples is disputed, but can broadly be understood in relation to colonialism. The phrase "indigenous peoples" refers to those pre-colonial societies that face a specific threat from this phenomenon of occupation, and the relation that these societies have with the colonial powers. The exact definition of who are the indigenous people, and the consequent state of rights-holders, varies. Being too inclusive is often considered as bad as being non-inclusive.

In the context of groups colonized by modern European states, the recognition of indigenous rights can be traced to at least the period of Renaissance. Along with the justification of colonialism with a higher purpose for both the colonists and colonized, some voices expressed concern over the way indigenous peoples were treated and the effect it had on their societies. In the Spanish Empire, the crown established the General Indian Court in Mexico and in Peru, with jurisdiction over cases involving the indigenous and aimed at protecting Indians from ill-treatment. Indians' access to the court was enabled by a small tax which paid for legal aides.

The issue of indigenous rights is also associated with other levels of human struggle. Due to the close relationship between indigenous peoples' cultural and economic situations and their environmental settings, indigenous rights issues are linked with concerns over environmental change and sustainable development. According to scientists and organizations like the Rainforest Foundation, the struggle for indigenous peoples is essential for solving the problem of reducing carbon emission, and approaching the threat on both cultural and biological diversity in general.

== International Legal Framework ==
The rights of Indigenous peoples are recognized under various international legal instruments that provide both normative guidance and, in some cases, binding obligations.

=== United Nations Declaration on the Rights of Indigenous Peoples (UNDRIP) ===
Adopted by the United Nations General Assembly on 13 September 2007, the UNDRIP is a key reference point in the global protection of Indigenous rights. Though the Declaration is not legally binding, it represents a widely accepted standard of minimum rights and obligations, emphasizing both individual and collective rights. Key provisions include:

- Rights over lands, territories, and resources traditionally owned or used by Indigenous peoples (Articles 25–26).
- The right to self-determination (Article 3), allowing Indigenous communities to freely pursue their economic, social, and cultural development.
- Remedies for violations, including restitution and compensation (Article 28).
- The guarantee of free, prior and informed consent (FPIC) before states adopt measures that affect their lands or rights (Article 19).
- Cultural rights, including the preservation of language, traditions, and institutions (Articles 11–14).

=== Representation ===
The rights, claims and even identity of indigenous peoples are apprehended, acknowledged and observed quite differently from government to government. Various organizations exist with charters to in one way or another promote (or at least acknowledge) indigenous aspirations, and indigenous societies have often banded together to form bodies which jointly seek to further their communal interests.

=== International organizations ===
There are several non-governmental civil society movements, networks, indigenous and non-indigenous organizations whose founding mission is to protect indigenous rights, including land rights. These organizations, networks and groups underline that the problems that indigenous peoples are facing is the lack of recognition that they are entitled to live the way they choose, and lack of the right to their lands and territories. Their mission is to protect the rights of indigenous peoples without states imposing their ideas of "development". These groups say that each indigenous culture is differentiated, rich of religious believe systems, way of life, sustenance and arts, and that the root of problem would be the interference with their way of living by state's disrespect to their rights, as well as the invasion of traditional lands by multinational corporations and small businesses for exploitation of natural resources.

=== United Nations Mechanism ===
Under UNDRIP, states are urged to cooperate with Indigenous peoples and consult in good faith to ensure their participation in decisions affecting them. The United Nations Permanent Forum on Indigenous Issues (UNPFII) and other mechanisms support implementation, monitoring, and advocacy.

Indigenous peoples and their interests are represented in the United Nations primarily through the mechanisms of the Working Group on Indigenous Populations. In April 2000 the United Nations Commission on Human Rights adopted a resolution to establish the United Nations Permanent Forum on Indigenous Issues (PFII) as an advisory body to the Economic and Social Council with a mandate to review indigenous issues.

In late December 2004, the United Nations General Assembly proclaimed 2005–2014 to be the Second International Decade of the World's Indigenous People. The main goal of the new decade will be to strengthen international cooperation around resolving the problems faced by indigenous peoples in areas such as culture, education, health, human rights, the environment, and social and economic development.

In September 2007, after a process of preparations, discussions and negotiations stretching back to 1982, the General Assembly adopted the Declaration on the Rights of Indigenous Peoples. The non-binding declaration outlines the individual and collective rights of indigenous peoples, as well as their rights to identity, culture, language, employment, health, education and other issues. Four nations with significant indigenous populations voted against the declaration: the United States, Canada, New Zealand and Australia. All four have since then changed their vote in favour. Eleven nations abstained: Azerbaijan, Bangladesh, Bhutan, Burundi, Colombia, Georgia, Kenya, Nigeria, Russia, Samoa and Ukraine. Thirty-four nations did not vote, while the remaining 143 nations voted for it.

=== ILO Convention No. 169 ===
ILO 169 is a convention of the International Labour Organization. Once ratified by a state, it is meant to work as a law protecting tribal people's rights. There are twenty-two physical survival and integrity, but also the preservation of their land, language and religion rights. The ILO represents indigenous rights as they are the organisation that enforced instruments the deal with indigenous rights exclusively.

=== Organization of American States ===
Since 1997, the nations of the Organization of American States have been discussing draft versions of a proposed American Declaration on the Rights of Indigenous Peoples. "The draft declaration is currently one of the most important processes underway with regard to indigenous rights in the Americas" as mentioned by the International Work Group for Indigenous Affairs. In 2016, the declaration was adopted by 35 member states by consensus while USA and Canada expressed general reservations.

=== By country ===
==== Bolivia ====
Indigenous persons, who form a majority of the Bolivian population, have been denied land rights owing to their traditional collective ownership of land under the "ayllu" system. Although Bolivian law requires that wrongs against individuals and groups who once owned land under this system be redressed, injustice on this front is still widespread. Indigenous people are insufficiently represented in government and suffer high unemployment.

Amnesty International complained in a 2012 report that Bolivian authorities had made decisions about construction of a highway across the Isiboro Sécure Indigenous Territory and National Park (Territorio Indígena y Parque Nacional Isiboro Sécure, TIPNIS) without consulting the indigenous people who live there. This lack of consultation resulted in a confusion and conflict, with some indigenous people supporting the road and others opposing it, and the government reversing its plans more than once.

Human Rights Watch asked Bolivia in 2011 to ensure "a prompt, thorough, and impartial investigation" of alleged police abuse of peaceful indigenous protestors near Yucomo on September 25 of that year. A report by the UN Committee for the Prevention of Racial Discrimination, issued in the same year, called on Bolivia to adopt urgent means to ensure that the Guaraní people are able to exercise their rights, including their rights to recover their ancestral lands.

In accordance with the Bolivian constitution and law, seven special "indigenous districts" have been established in order to increase the participation of indigenous peoples in national politics.

==== Canada ====
In Canada "Aboriginal rights" (French: droits ancestraux) are those rights that the Indigenous peoples in Canada enjoy as a result of their ancestors' long occupancy of the land, for example the right to hunt and fish a particular territory. These are distinct from "treaty rights" which are enumerated in specific agreements between Indigenous groups and the state. Both treaty rights and Aboriginal rights are protected by Section 35 of the Canadian constitution of 1982.

==== Denmark ====
The indigenous people of Greenland gained home rule in 1979 and extended to self-government in 2009.

==== Finland ====
In February 2013, Finland had not signed the international Declaration on the Rights of Indigenous Peoples nor the Indigenous and Tribal Peoples Convention, 1989 (ILO-convention 169). In March 2014, Finland had not ratified the ILO-convention 169. Sauli Niinistö, the President of Finland, called the treaty irrelevant. However, the Sami people of Finland's north and Lapland have had no special rights, for example, in land rights for reindeer herding. In October 2011, the UN Human Rights Committee called for the cessation of the killing of reindeer in Nellim, Inari. Reindeer owners and the Metsähallitus (Department of Forestry) were in dispute over this matter. In 2019, the Human Rights Committee of the United Nations, found Finland to have violated Sámi political rights, as the Supreme Court of Finland had from 2011 and onwards, began using non-objective criteria when determining allowance of membership in the electoral rolls to the Sámi parliament.

==== New Zealand ====
The country is also known as Aotearoa/New Zealand.

== Secession ==
Indigenous peoples have a mere "remedial" right to secession in international law, irrespective of their right of self-determination and self-government, leaving the existence of rights of secession to internal laws of sovereign states, and independence to the capacities of states.

== See also ==
- African Commission on Human and Peoples' Rights
- Bioregionalism
- Bumiputra
- Cultural diversity
- Cultural imperialism
- Indigenism
- Indigenization
- Indigenous intellectual property
- Indigenous land rights
- Indigenous law
- International Day of the World's Indigenous Peoples
- Free, prior and informed consent
- Jus sanguinis
- Minority rights
- Nativism
- United Nations Special Rapporteur on the Rights of Indigenous Peoples
- United Nations Permanent Forum on Indigenous Issues
- Survival International
- Xenophobia
