= Nohelia Ibarra Fránquez =

Mexican politician

- Born: 17 September 1966 (age 59); Nayarit, Mexico
- Occupation: Politician
- Political party: We Are Mexico
- Other political affiliations: PRD
- Spouse: Guadalupe Acosta Naranjo

Sonia Nohelia Ibarra Fránquez (born 17 September 1966) is a Mexican politician from the We Are Mexico party. As member of the Party of the Democratic Revolution, from 2006 to 2009, she was a deputy in the LX Legislature of the Mexican Congress representing Nayarit.
