= 2027 Mexican legislative election =

- 6 June 2027
- All 500 seats in the Chamber of Deputies; 251 seats needed for a majority
- Opinion polls
Party	Leader	Last election
MORENA	Ariadna Montiel Reyes	236
PVEM	Karen Castrejón Trujillo	77
PAN	Jorge Romero Herrera	72
PT	Alberto Anaya	51
PRI	Alejandro Moreno Cárdenas	35
MC	Jorge Máynez	27
PAZ	Armando González Escoto	New
Somos	Guadalupe Acosta Naranjo	New
Results by constituency

Legislative elections are scheduled to be held in Mexico on 6 June 2027. Voters will elect all 500 members of the Chamber of Deputies, who will serve during the LXVII Legislature (2027–2030). These elections will take place concurrently with the 2027 state elections.

== Background ==
=== 2024 election ===
In the 2024 election, Sigamos Haciendo Historia, the coalition of the National Regeneration Movement (Morena), the Ecologist Green Party of Mexico (PVEM) and the Labor Party (PT), won 256 of the 300 single-member districts and 108 proportional seats, about 73% of the Chamber of Deputies and a supermajority in the lower house. It fell three seats short of a supermajority in the Senate, but reached it through later defections, the first time since the LIII Legislature that a governing party or coalition had held a supermajority in both chambers.

The opposition was left substantially weakened. Fuerza y Corazón por México, the coalition of the National Action Party (PAN), the Institutional Revolutionary Party (PRI) and the Party of the Democratic Revolution (PRD), won less than a third of the presidential vote, and the PRD, founded in 1989, lost its national registration after falling below the 3% threshold. In October 2025, the PAN's national leader, Jorge Romero, ended the party's electoral alliance with the PRI, and the PAN and Citizens' Movement (MC) rejected the PRI's call for a united front, leaving the three parties to compete separately against the governing coalition.

=== Constitutional reforms ===
The governing coalition used its supermajority to pass a package of constitutional amendments known as "Plan C", proposed by former president Andrés Manuel López Obrador and championed by his successor, Claudia Sheinbaum, often through fast-track procedures that cut committee deliberation short. By September 2026, Sheinbaum said, Congress had approved 27 constitutional reforms during her presidency.

The most contested came in late 2024: the judicial reform, which replaced the federal judiciary with judges chosen by popular vote; the transfer of the National Guard to military control, which the opposition called militarization; a ban on courts reviewing constitutional amendments; and the abolition of seven autonomous bodies, among them the transparency institute (INAI) and the competition commission (Cofece). Later amendments made welfare programs constitutional rights, banned consecutive reelection and "electoral nepotism", and introduced a 40-hour working week. In 2026, Congress postponed the next judicial election to 2028, made proven foreign intervention a ground for annulling an election, which the PAN called an electoral shield for Morena, and barred people with dual nationality from serving as president or governor.

The coalition's unity nonetheless began to weaken. In December 2025, the PT abstained for the first time on one of Sheinbaum's initiatives, a revision of the tariff law. On 11 March 2026, her constitutional electoral reform, which would have cut party funding and reduced the Senate from 128 to 96 seats, fell short of a two-thirds majority in the Chamber of Deputies, 259 votes to 234, after most PT and PVEM deputies voted against it. Congress instead passed a narrower "Plan B", from which the PT and the opposition struck out Sheinbaum's proposal to hold her recall vote alongside the 2027 election.

=== INE contracting scandal ===
The election will be organized by the National Electoral Institute (INE), whose leadership changed after the electoral process had begun. In October 2026, its president, Guadalupe Taddei, resigned over allegations, which she denied, that the institute had favored certain suppliers in its purchases of electoral materials. Councilor Blanca Cruz García became provisional president, and the appointment of a permanent successor passed to the Chamber of Deputies, which elects the INE president by a two-thirds vote.

== Electoral system ==
=== Seat allocation ===
The 500 members of the Chamber of Deputies serve three-year terms and are elected under a mixed system. Three hundred are chosen by plurality in single-member districts. The remaining 200 are elected by proportional representation from regional party lists in five electoral regions of 40 seats each. The lists must observe gender parity, and the regional lists are headed alternately by women and men from one election to the next.

Proportional seats are allocated in each region according to the parties' shares of the vote there, and only parties that win at least 3% of the valid national vote take part in the allocation. Two limits restrict the result: no party may hold more than 300 seats under both principles combined, and no party's share of the chamber may exceed its share of the national vote by more than eight percentage points. A party that would breach either limit loses proportional seats until it complies, and the surplus seats pass to the other parties.

Because votes for coalition candidates are counted for each party according to the emblem under which they were cast, the limits apply to each coalition partner separately rather than to the coalition as a whole. From 1996, the limits had covered coalitions as well, as the electoral code treated a coalition as a single party when allocating seats. A new code in January 2008 dropped that provision, and the National Electoral Institute (INE) applied the limits party by party at every election from 2009 onward. The cap was disputed after the 2024 election, when the INE's General Council voted eight to three for an allocation that gave the National Regeneration Movement (Morena), the Ecologist Green Party of Mexico (PVEM), and the Labor Party (PT) 364 of the 500 seats, a two-thirds majority. The three councilors in the minority had proposed a stricter reading of the cap, under which a party could exceed its vote share by no more than 8% of that share; under that reading the three parties would have had 317 seats. The National Action Party (PAN), the Institutional Revolutionary Party (PRI), and Citizens' Movement (MC) filed 8,662 challenges, arguing that the eight-point margin should apply to the coalition, but the Electoral Tribunal of the Federal Judiciary (TEPJF) upheld the allocation by four votes to one.

=== Candidates and coalitions ===
Parties may form coalitions for the 300 district seats, in three forms: total, covering all 300 districts; partial, covering at least 150; and flexible, covering at least 75. Coalition agreements must be filed with the INE by 4 January 2027, the day pre-campaigns open. Newly registered parties may not join a coalition until they have contested their first election, so Building Societies of Peace (PAZ) and SOMOS must run alone in 2027, and each must win at least 3% of the national vote to keep its registration.

Each party must notify the INE of its candidate-selection procedure 30 days before pre-campaigns begin, and its internal process must apply criteria on gender parity, affirmative action, and consecutive reelection. Parties must choose their district candidates by 19 February 2027 and their list candidates by 26 February, and resolve internal appeals by 12 March. Deputies may serve up to four consecutive terms; a 2025 constitutional amendment bars immediate reelection from the 2030 elections onward, making 2027 the last federal election at which sitting deputies may seek a further consecutive term.

Independent candidates may contest district seats. Aspirants have until 13 December 2026 to give notice of their intent and must then gather signatures equal to 2% of the district's electoral roll by 12 February 2027.

=== Voters and administration ===
The National Electoral Institute (INE) organizes the election, which is held on the same day as local elections across the country; federal and local ballots are cast at the same location. As of 27 August 2026, the electoral roll held 100,862,772 voters, the largest in the country's history, and the INE planned to install 176,741 polling stations. Mexicans living abroad cannot vote for federal deputies.

Disputes are resolved by the Electoral Tribunal of the Federal Judiciary (TEPFJ), and the INE assigns the proportional representation seats once the tribunal has ruled on all challenges to the district results. The 2027 calendar schedules that allocation for 1 to 23 August 2027; the deputies elected will form the LXVII Legislature.

== Political parties and coalitions ==
Eight national political parties are registered with the INE and are eligible to participate in federal elections: the National Action Party (PAN), the Institutional Revolutionary Party (PRI), the Labor Party (PT), the Ecologist Green Party of Mexico (PVEM), Citizens' Movement (MC), the National Regeneration Movement (Morena), Building Societies of Peace (PAZ), and We Are (SOMOS).

=== Summary ===
Party	Leader	Ideology	2024 result	
Party	Leader	Ideology	PR vote (%)	Seats
National Regeneration Movement	Ariadna Montiel Reyes	Anti-neoliberalism; Alter-globalization; Left-wing populism; Left-wing nationalism	42.40%	236 / 500 (47%)
Ecologist Green Party of Mexico	Karen Castrejón Trujillo	Green politics	8.72%	77 / 500 (15%)
National Action Party	Jorge Romero Herrera	National conservatism; Christian democracy	17.55%	72 / 500 (14%)
Labor Party	Alberto Anaya	Socialism; Maoism; Socialism of the 21st century	5.68%	51 / 500 (10%)
Institutional Revolutionary Party	Alejandro Moreno Cárdenas	Catch-all politics	11.57%	35 / 500 (7%)
Citizens' Movement	Jorge Máynez	Social democracy; Participatory democracy; Progressivism	11.34%	27 / 500 (5%)
Building Societies of Peace	Armando González Escoto	Christian right	Did not exist	
We Are	Guadalupe Acosta Naranjo	Progressivism; Social liberalism; Federalism	Did not exist	

=== New parties ===
To register as a national political party, an organization had to affiliate at least 0.26% of the electoral roll used in the previous federal election (256,030 people) by 28 February 2026, and to hold either 20 state assemblies of at least 3,000 members or 200 district assemblies of at least 300 by 15 February. Of the 89 organizations that gave notice of their intent in early 2025, five applied for registration in February 2026.

On 25 June 2026, the INE General Council registered Building Societies of Peace (PAZ), the successor to the Social Encounter Party and the Solidarity Encounter Party, and We Are (SOMOS), which grew out of the Marea Rosa (lit. 'pink tide'), a citizens' movement that defended the INE's autonomy against Andrés Manuel López Obrador's 2022 electoral reform and backed Xóchitl Gálvez in the 2024 presidential election. It rejected two other applicants. It refused México Tiene Vida (lit. 'Mexico Has Life'), an anti-abortion group, by six votes to five, after finding that ministers of religion had taken part in at least 58 of its assemblies and that it had received an undeclared corporate donation. It refused Que Siga la Democracia (lit. 'Let Democracy Continue') by seven votes to four, for falsified affiliation records and payments to people who attended its assemblies.
