= Cecilia Soto González =

Mexican politician

Personal details
- Born: 24 January 1950 (age 76) Hermosillo, Sonora
- Party: Somos México (2026–present)
- Other political affiliations: Party of the Democratic Revolution (2015–2024); Labor Party (1994); Authentic Party of the Mexican Revolution (1985-1994)
- Education: UNAM
- Occupation: Politician

Cecilia Soto González (born 24 January 1950) is a Mexican politician, currently affiliated to the Somos México party. She previously served as a federal deputy to the LXIII Legislature of the Mexican Congress for the Party of the Democratic Revolution. She was the presidential candidate of the Labor Party (PT) in the 1994 Mexican general election.

== Biography ==
Soto González was born in Hermosillo and began her political career in the Authentic Party of the Mexican Revolution; she was a member of its National Executive Committee between 1985 and 1993. She was a local deputy to the LII Legislature of the Congress of Sonora, which met from 1988 to 1991, and a federal deputy to the LV Legislature of the Mexican Congress, which convened between 1991 and 1994.

In 1994, Soto left the PARM in order to accept the Labor Party's presidential nomination. After placing fourth, she later developed a rift with the party when it refused to discuss various reforms she had proposed. In 2001, President Vicente Fox appointed her as the Mexican ambassador to Brazil. Soto was among the more active Mexican diplomats in Brazil, traveling extensively and promoting Mexican firms in the country.

In 2008, Carlos Slim appointed Soto to be the Executive Director of the Technological Institute of Teléfonos de México, a non-profit organization promoting education. She remained in that position for six years.

In 2015, Soto returned to the Chamber of Deputies for the first time in more than 20 years, on the party ticket of the Party of the Democratic Revolution. She represents the Federal District of Mexico City from the fourth electoral region and serves as the President of the Federal District Commission, also serving on those for Climate Change, Committee for the Center for Social Studies and Public Opinion, and Foreign Relations. She was also designated by the Chamber of Deputies to serve as one of its representatives to the Constituent Assembly of Mexico City.
