= Mirna Rincón Vargas =

Mexican politician

- Born: 22 February 1959 (age 67); Tijuana, Baja California, Mexico
- Occupation: Politician
- Political party: PAN

Mirna Cecilia Rincón Vargas (born 22 February 1959) is a Mexican politician affiliated with the National Action Party (PAN). In the 2006 general election she was elected to the Chamber of Deputies to represent Baja California's 8th district during the 60th session of Congress.

== See also ==
- Politics of Mexico
- List of political parties in Mexico
