= Mayra Karina Robles Aguirre =

Mexican politician

- Born: 7 September 1972 (age 53); Tijuana, Baja California, Mexico
- Occupation: Politician
- Political party: PRI

Mayra Karina Robles Aguirre (born 7 September 1972) is a Mexican politician affiliated with the Institutional Revolutionary Party (PRI). In the 2012 general election she was elected to the Chamber of Deputies to represent Baja California's 8th district during the 62nd session of Congress.
