= Óscar Martín Arce Paniagua =

Mexican politician

President of the Chamber of Deputies
- In office 1 May 2012 – 31 August 2012
- Preceded by: Guadalupe Acosta Naranjo
- Succeeded by: Jesús Murillo Karam

Personal details
- Born: 10 March 1967 (age 59) Tijuana, Baja California, Mexico
- Party: PAN
- Education: UABC; Universidad Iberoamericana
- Occupation: Politician

Óscar Martín Arce Paniagua (born 10 March 1967) is a Mexican politician from the National Action Party (PAN). In the 2009 mid-terms he was elected to the Chamber of Deputies to represent Baja California's 8th district during the 61st session of Congress (2009–2012).
