= Guadalupe Acosta Naranjo =

Mexican politician

President of the Chamber of Deputies
- In office 15 December 2011 – 30 April 2012
- Preceded by: Emilio Chuayffet Chemor
- Succeeded by: Óscar Martín Arce Paniagua

Personal details
- Born: 3 June 1964 (age 62) Juan José Ríos, Sinaloa, Mexico
- Party: We Are Mexico
- Other political affiliations: Party of the Democratic Revolution (1986–2024)
- Spouse: Sonia Ibarra
- Occupation: Deputy

Guadalupe Acosta Naranjo (born 3 June 1964) is a Mexican politician affiliated with the We Are Mexico party. He represented Nayarit and the first electoral region as a deputy to the LXIII Legislature of the Mexican Congress for the Party of the Democratic Revolution.

== Life ==
While he was born in Juan José Ríos, Sinaloa, most of Acosta Naranjo's political career has developed in the state of Nayarit. He attended the Universidad Autónoma de Nayarit, obtaining a degree in economics and becoming the school of economics's student leader. A devout Marxist, he argued against participating in elections and worked in labor activism against the powerful, PRI-linked unions. He also served in various left-wing organizations, including the Movimiento Lucha Popular and Organización Revolucionaria Punto Crítico. In 1989, Acosta Naranjo became a founding member of the new PRD, and the next year, he began the first of two terms in the state congress of Nayarit, serving between 1990 and 1993 and again from 1996 to 1999; in his first term, he was the youngest legislator in the state, and during his second stint, he headed the PRD faction in the congress. He also made an unsuccessful run at the municipal presidency of Tepic in 1993. He was jailed after holding a rally to denounce fraud in the election. In 1999, after a PRD-PAN alliance beat the PRI in the gubernatorial elections, Acosta became the subsecretary of government but soon after clashed with Antonio Echavarría when the latter asked him to support the PAN's presidential candidate in 2000, Vicente Fox.

After some time away from politics, Acosta Naranjo made a mark again in the mid-2000s within the PRD party structure. He was the subsecretary general during 2003, the national Secretary of Planning and Institutional Development from 2003 to 2004, and the Secretary of Organization from 2004 to 2005. Most notably, he became the secretary general, the second-in-command of the party, from 2005 to 2008, and the interim president during 2008 after Leonel Cota Montaño left. He also clashed with Andrés Manuel López Obrador, disagreeing with his decision to disrupt the delivery of Vicente Fox's final government report in the aftermath of the 2006 presidential election.

In 2009, the PRD placed Acosta Naranjo on its list from the fifth region, sending him to the Chamber of Deputies for the LXI Legislature representing the State of Mexico. He was a president of the board of directors and served on commissions dealing with public spending, government, labor and social welfare, and the sugar industry. While a deputy, he made a failed bid for governor of Nayarit, and from 2013 to 2014, he was the PRD's technical secretary for the Guiding Council of the Pacto por México.

In 2015, Acosta Naranjo returned to San Lázaro, this time representing the first region and Nayarit, for the LXIII Legislature. He serves on commissions related to national defense, hydraulic resources, and foreign relations, and is a secretary of the Permanent Commission's board of directors for the second recess of 2016.

Acosta Naranjo is noted for his positions on opposing the PRI at all costs, sometimes even supporting other political parties to get the PRI out of office. In the 2016 Tamaulipas gubernatorial elections, he called on the opposition to unite behind PAN opposition candidate Francisco Javier García Cabeza de Vaca, claiming his endorsement was not an abandonment of his party and threatening legal action if the PRD responded with a move to expel him. In a May 2016 radio interview, he also claimed that if the opposition united under a single candidate, the PRI would not win any elections.
