= Jorge Romero Herrera =

Mexican politician (born 1979)

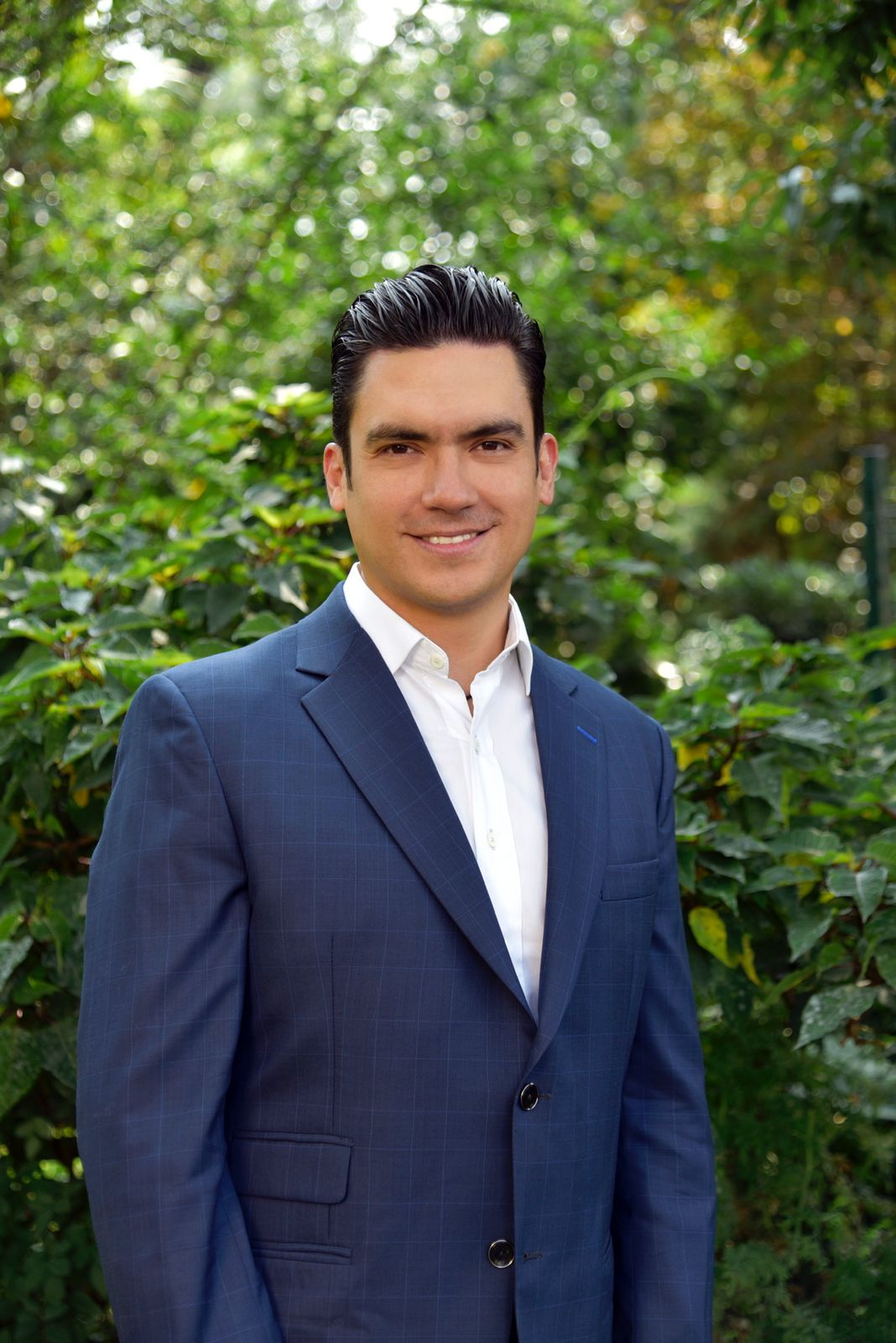
- Romero in 2021

President of the National Action Party
- Incumbent
- Assumed office 19 November 2024
- Preceded by: Marko Antonio Cortés Mendoza

Personal details
- Born: 3 January 1979 (age 47)
- Party: National Action Party

Jorge Romero Herrera (born 3 January 1979) is a Mexican politician serving as a member of the Chamber of Deputies since 2018. He has served as president of the National Action Party since 2024.
