= General Indian Court (New Spain) =

The General Indian Court of Mexico (Juzgado General de Indios) was a judicial body established 1585-1607 by the Spanish crown in New Spain to adjudicate disputes between indigenous communities and individuals. Creating a court that allowed Indians swift, inexpensive, and effective justice came after the failure of crown efforts to provide legal redress through Spanish courts and legal procedures. A monograph by historian Woodrow Borah examines the precedents for establishing the court, the procedures it adopted, and the financing legal aid to Indians through a tax of a half real. Previous to the court’s formal establishment, viceroys handled a good number of complaints by indigenous, a practice initiated by New Spain’s first viceroy, Don Antonio de Mendoza.

== Background ==
The court was established after the almost complete destruction of the indigenous populations in the Caribbean and the precipitous fall in those populations in Central Mexico during the sixteenth century. Similar processes were at work in Peru and Viceroy Francisco de Toledo established the Juzgado General de Indios del Peru, which set the precedent for the Indian court in Mexico. Spanish officials came to recognize that the access of indigenous individuals and communities to courts for summary judgments at low cost and without the possibility of extended litigation would benefit them. The legal theory underpinning the establishment of the court was that the crown had the duty to protect miserables, such as widows and orphans, and the classification was extended to the indigenous peoples. The crown had already established a legal division between the Indians and the non-Indian populations broadly conceived (Spaniards, Africans, and mixed-race castas) with the República de Indios and the República de Españoles. Although with the establishment of the Holy Office of the Inquisition in 1571, indigenous were deemed perpetual neophytes and excluded from its jurisdiction, but the establishment of the General Indian Court under Viceroy Luis Velasco II, indigenous, particularly in Central Mexico, had standing in the legal system. With the help of legal aides funded by a half-real tax, indigenous could pursue legal redress through the courts. Vested Spanish interests opposed the establishment of the court, since their practices could be blocked by complaints by indigenous about exploitation.
