= Opinion polling on the Sheinbaum presidency =

This article summarizes the results of polls taken during the presidency of Claudia Sheinbaum, which gather and analyze public opinion on her administration's performance and policies.

== Presidential approval ==
=== 2026 ===
Date(s) conducted	Pollster	Sample size	Approve	Disapprove	Und./ no ans.	Net
5–9 Nov	AtlasIntel	2,047	57.9	33.8	8.4	+24.1
15–20 Oct	El Financiero	800	69.0	31.0	—	+38.0
2–7 Oct	AtlasIntel	1,738	57.4	28.9	13.7	+28.5
10–15 Sep; 17–20 Sep	El Financiero	800	70.0	30.0	—	+40.0
30 Aug – 3 Sep	AtlasIntel	1,961	59.0	34.5	6.4	+24.5
25–29 Aug	Enkoll	1,205	69.0	26.0	5.0	+43.0
12–16 Aug; 20–23 Aug	El Financiero	800	68.0	32.0	—	+36.0
30 Jul – 3 Aug	AtlasIntel	1,230	57.2	33.3	9.5	+23.9
13–17 Jul; 22–25 Jul	El Financiero	800	67.0	33.0	—	+34.0
26–30 Jun	AtlasIntel	3,535	48.9	37.7	13.4	+11.2
16–19 Jun; 21–28 Jun	El Financiero	1,000	68.0	32.0	—	+36.0
9–31 May	Varela y Asociados	873	57.0	37.0	6.0	+20.0
21–25 May	AtlasIntel	3,276	52.8	38.1	9.1	+14.7
16–19 May	Enkoll	1,207	68.0	27.0	5.0	+41.0
8–13 May; 21–25 May	El Financiero	800	69.0	31.0	—	+38.0
7–12 May	Becerra Mizuno y Asociados	800	59.0	39.0	2.0	+20.0
24–28 Apr	AtlasIntel	2,948	50.7	42.7	6.6	+8.0
16–21 Apr; 22–28 Apr	El Financiero	800	68.0	32.0	—	+36.0
20 Feb – 10 Apr	Pew Research Center	1,017	64.0	35.0	1.0	+29.0
1–31 Mar	Mitofsky	59,548	68.4	31.2	0.4	+37.2
12–28 Mar	Varela y Asociados	1,080	60.0	36.0	4.0	+24.0
20–24 Mar	AtlasIntel	3,263	53.9	40.9	5.2	+13.0
13–22 Mar	El Financiero	800	70.0	29.0	—	+41.0
26–28 Feb	Enkoll	1,210	75.0	20.0	5.0	+55.0
1–28 Feb	Mitofsky	57,500	69.1	30.8	0.1	+38.3
19–24 Feb	AtlasIntel	2,023	56.0	36.1	7.9	+19.9
13–21 Feb; 24–27 Feb	El Financiero	1,300	72.0	28.0	—	+44.0
1–31 Jan	Mitofsky	67,782	69.2	30.6	0.2	+38.6
14–21 Jan	El Financiero	800	69.0	30.0	—	+39.0
15–20 Jan	AtlasIntel	4,099	62.8	30.5	6.7	+32.3

=== 2025 ===
Date(s) conducted	Pollster	Sample size	Approve	Disapprove	Und./ no ans.	Net
10–17 Dec	El Financiero	800	69.0	31.0	—	+38.0
28 Nov – 1 Dec	Enkoll	1,201	74.0	24.0	2.0	+50.0
13–18 Nov; 21–24 Nov	El Financiero	1,000	70.0	30.0	—	+40.0
15–19 Oct; 24–28 Oct	El Financiero	1,000	70.0	30.0	—	+40.0
24–26 Sep	Enkoll	1,019	78.0	18.0	4.0	+60.0
11–15 Sep; 18–22 Sep	El Financiero	1,000	73.0	27.0	—	+46.0
8–12 Sep	Varela y Asociados	600	68.0	29.0	4.0	+39.0
26–27 Aug	Enkoll	1,223	79.0	18.0	3.0	+61.0
14–18 Aug; 21–25 Aug	El Financiero	1,000	74.0	26.0	—	+48.0
19–22 Jul	Enkoll	1,215	80.0	17.0	3.0	+63.0
10–14 Jul; 24–28 Jul	El Financiero	1,000	75.0	24.0	1.0	+51.0
5–9 Jun; 19–23 Jun	El Financiero	1,000	76.0	22.0	2.0	+54.0
18–20 May	Enkoll	1,023	83.0	15.0	2.0	+68.0
9–13 May; 15–20 May	El Financiero	1,100	77.0	22.0	1.0	+55.0
3–7 Apr; 24–28 Apr	El Financiero	1,100	81.0	18.0	1.0	+63.0
26 Mar – 1 Apr	Becerra Mizuno y Asociados	800	80.0	15.0	5.0	+65.0
12 Feb – 25 Mar	Pew Research Center	1,050	83.0	15.0	2.0	+68.0
20–23 Mar	Enkoll	1,202	82.0	15.0	3.0	+67.0
4–9 Mar; 20–23 Mar	El Financiero	900	83.0	15.0	2.0	+68.0
13–17 Feb; 20–24 Feb	El Financiero	800	85.0	15.0	—	+70.0
8–14 Jan; 23–27 Jan	El Financiero	900	81.0	15.0	4.0	+66.0
3–5 Jan	Enkoll	1,213	80.0	16.0	4.0	+64.0

== Sheinbaum issue handling net approval ==
=== 2026 ===
Date(s) conducted	Pollster	Sample size	Corruption	Economy	Infrastructure	Organized crime	Public education	Public health	Public security	Social programs	Women's rights
25–29 Aug	Enkoll	1,205	−5.0	+4.0	+24.0	—	+21.0	+5.0	−6.0	+62.0	+58.0
12–16 Aug; 20–23 Aug	El Financiero	800	−59.0	+7.0	—	−67.0	—	—	−63.0	+35.0	—
13–17 Jul; 22–25 Jul	El Financiero	800	−42.0	+9.0	—	−54.0	—	—	−40.0	+41.0	—
16–19 Jun; 21–28 Jun	El Financiero	1,000	−46.0	+6.0	—	−63.0	—	—	−48.0	+40.0	—
16–19 May	Enkoll	1,207	−11.0	+1.0	+29.0	—	+18.0	−2.0	−14.0	+63.0	+57.0
8–13 May; 21–25 May	El Financiero	800	−31.0	+6.0	—	−42.0	—	—	−41.0	+43.0	—
16–21 Apr; 22–28 Apr	El Financiero	800	−28.0	+9.0	—	−35.0	—	—	−24.0	+43.0	—
13–22 Mar	El Financiero	800	−60.0	+11.0	—	−58.0	—	—	−11.0	+45.0	—
26–28 Feb	Enkoll	1,210	−1.0	+13.0	+36.0	—	+29.0	+3.0	+1.0	+67.0	+66.0
13–21 Feb; 24–27 Feb	El Financiero	1,300	−62.0	+17.0	—	−61.0	—	—	−5.0	+47.0	—
14–21 Jan	El Financiero	800	−57.0	+2.0	—	−60.0	—	—	−13.0	+37.0	—
