= We Are (Mexico) =

Political party in Mexico

We Are Somos
- Leader: Guadalupe Acosta Naranjo
- Secretary-General: Cecilia Soto González
- Founded: 22 January 2025
- Registered: 25 June 2026
- Split from: Party of the Democratic Revolution
- Headquarters: Mexico City
- Ideology: Social liberalism; Social democracy; Federalism; Humanism; Progressivism
- Political position: Centre to centre-left
- Colors: Pink and white
- Slogan: La fuerza que nos une ('The force that unites us')

Website
- somosmx.org.mx

We Are (Spanish: Somos) is a political party in Mexico. It is led by Guadalupe Acosta Naranjo, who formerly led the Party of the Democratic Revolution (PRD). The party has a centre to centre-left political ideology, favouring progressivism. The party was born as an organisation opposing Andrés Manuel López Obrador, the president of Mexico between 2018 and 2024. The party became a national political party in 2026, registered as We Are Mexico (Spanish: Somos México, abbreviated as Somos MX), but electoral authorities requested the logo and name changes.

== History ==
=== Civil association (2022–2024) ===
Somos México traces its origins to Marea Rosa, a Mexican civic movement that emerged in Mexico City during late 2022 in opposition to then-President Andrés Manuel López Obrador’s proposed electoral reforms. Initially organised to defend the autonomy of the National Electoral Institute (INE), the movement gradually expanded its objectives to include the protection of judicial independence, constitutional order, and democratic institutions.

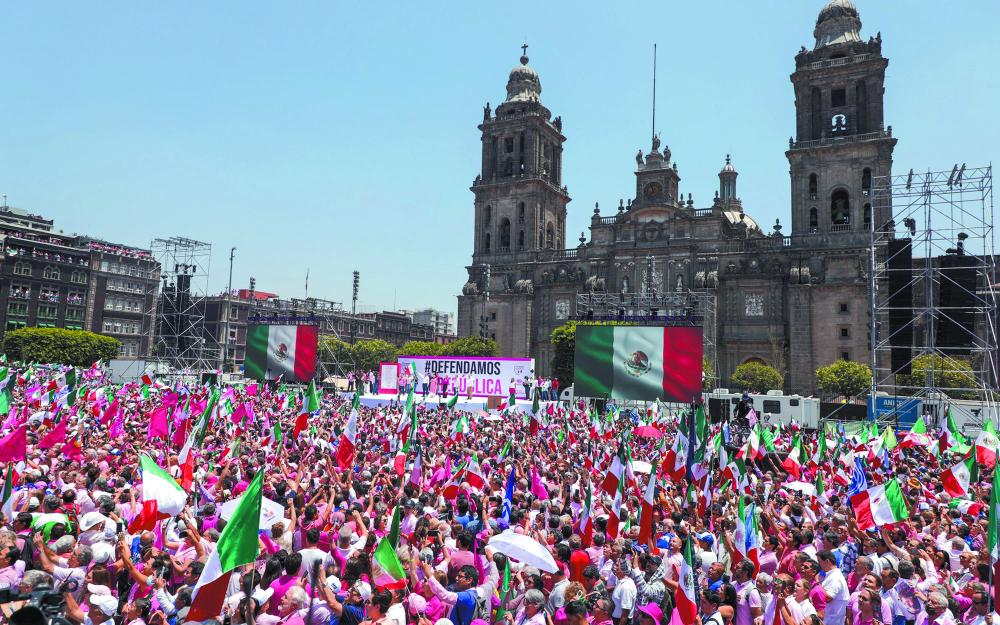
Marea Rosa

Although it described itself as nonpartisan, the movement drew support from across the political spectrum, including former members of the National Action Party (PAN), Institutional Revolutionary Party (PRI), Party of the Democratic Revolution (PRD), as well as independent public figures, making it one of the broadest opposition coalitions of López Obrador’s presidency. During the 2024 general election, many of its organisers publicly supported opposition presidential candidate Xóchitl Gálvez to address its final national rally in Mexico City’s Zócalo and publicly called for a “voto útil” in favor of her candidacy, marking a transition from civic mobilisation to active electoral participation.

=== Founding and early years (2025–present) ===
Following the election, movement leaders argued that civic activism alone was insufficient to influence public policy and announced plans to establish a permanent political party. In January 2025, this effort led to the creation of the civil association Personas Sumando en 2025, A.C., which submitted its notice of intent to the National Electoral Institute (INE) to seek registration as a national political party under the name Somos Mexico.

Throughout 2025 and early 2026, Somos México worked and surpassed the requirements by holding more than 200 validated district assemblies and registering over 256,000 verified members.

On 21 February 2026, delegates convened the organisation's founding National Assembly in Mexico City. During the meeting, members approved the party’s Declaration of Principles, Program of Action, and Statutes, and elected Guadalupe Acosta Naranjo as national president and Cecilia Soto as secretary-general.

On 25 June 2026, the General Council of the INE unanimously approved Somos México’s registration as a national political party, authorizing it to participate in the 2027 elections.

== Name and emblem ==
The party's name is Somos, the first-person plural present tense of the Spanish verb ser, meaning "we are". Its emblem, adopted in August 2026, sets the word in pink over a black-and-white silhouette of the Mexican republic, with white as the dominant colour.

The organisation had sought registration as Somos México ("We Are Mexico"), abbreviated Somos MX, with an emblem that placed the word Somos above the letters MX in Mexican pink on a white ground. Both the wording and the colour came from Marea Rosa, whose marchers had worn the pink and white of the INE's own graphic identity. According to Cecilia Soto González, the name was settled at assemblies of supporters during the registration drive and was meant to express affection for the country.

=== Dispute over the name, emblem and colours ===
The original emblem, using the party's former name (top). The first emblem proposed following the party's rename (bottom).

When it granted registration on 25 June 2026, the INE General Council also ordered the party, in a 6–5 vote, to abandon the name Somos México, the MX abbreviation and the pink colour scheme by 31 August. It held that the name was not neutral because it implied a connection between the party and the Mexican nation as a whole, that the letters MX could suggest the backing of the Mexican state, and that the party's pink was close to that of Fuerza por México (FXM), which holds registrations in several states.

The party appealed, arguing that the councillors had relied on speculative inferences and had applied a stricter standard than to other parties with comparable names and emblems. On 25 August 2026, the Electoral Tribunal of the Federal Judiciary upheld the order, holding that somos combined with México amounted to a "symbolic appropriation of national identity" that could lead voters to believe the party represented the whole country, and that the pink-and-white emblem was too close to that of FXM in Tlaxcala, Puebla and Baja California Sur.

== Ideology and political composition ==
Officially, Somos México describes itself as a citizen-based, pluralist, democratic, and humanist political party committed to the principles of liberty, equality, and community. Its Declaration of Principles emphasizes constitutional democracy, the rule of law, separation of powers, human rights, and the protection of autonomous public institutions. Party leaders have rejected traditional left–right labels, arguing instead that Mexico’s political divide is “between democrats and authoritarians.”

Independent observers generally describe the party as “centrist”, “liberal”, or “liberal-democratic” due to its support for democratic institutions, civil liberties, and a mixed-market economy.

=== Political composition ===
Somos México is composed primarily of former members of the National Action Party (PAN), Institutional Revolutionary Party (PRI), Party of the Democratic Revolution (PRD), and the Labour Party (PT), as well as members of the Marea Rosa movement.

Its leadership reflects this diverse background. Party president Guadalupe Acosta Naranjo is a former PRD leader, while secretary-general Cecilia Soto previously served as the PT’s 1994 presidential nominee and later joined the PRD. Other prominent figures and advisors include former PAN president Gustavo Madero Muñoz, former independent senator Emilio Álvarez Icaza, former INE Executive Secretary Edmundo Jacobo Molina, former INE president Lorenzo Córdova Vianello, former Supreme Court justice José Ramón Cossío Díaz, former PAN governor Carlos Medina Plascencia, and former PRI cabinet secretary Enrique de la Madrid.

Political commentators have described the party as a broad opposition coalition, while critics have argued that the prominence of former PAN, PRI, PRD, and PT politicians reflects a reorganisation of Mexico’s traditional opposition rather than the creation of a genuinely new political movement.

Party leaders have rejected this characterisation, maintaining that Somos México originated from the Marea Rosa civic movement and is a citizen-led organisation rather than the successor to any existing political party.

== Controversies ==
=== Membership verification ===
During the registration process, MORENA challenged thousands of Somos México’s membership affiliations, alleging that many were duplicated or otherwise invalid. In June 2026, the Electoral Tribunal unanimously rejected the challenge, finding that MORENA had not presented sufficient evidence to invalidate the registrations. The ruling allowed the INE to continue evaluating the party’s application for national registration.
