= LXII Legislature of the Mexican Congress =

Legislature of Mexico, 2012–2015

←	LXI Legislature	LXIII Legislature	→
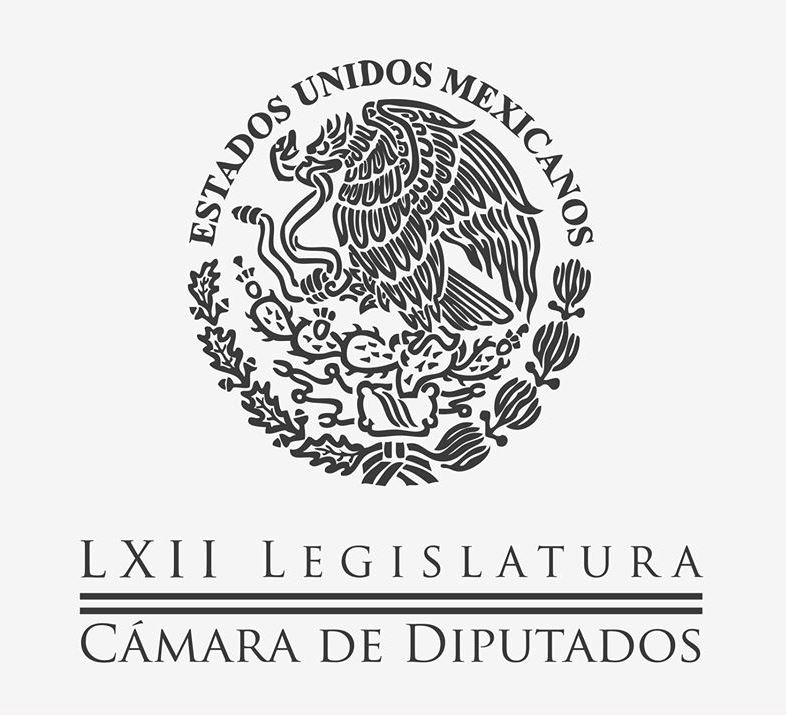

Overview
- Legislative body: Congress of the Union
- Jurisdiction: Mexico
- Term: 1 September 2012 – 31 August 2015

Senate of the Republic
- PRI (52) PAN (38) PRD (22) PVEM (9) PT (5) PANAL (1) MC (1)
- Members: Mixed: 96 by plurality (3 per state), 32 by proportional representation
- Senate President: Ernesto Cordero Arroyo (2012-2013); Raúl Cervantes Andrade (2013-2014); Miguel Barbosa Huerta (2014-2015)

Chamber of Deputies
- PRI (212) PAN (114) PRD (104) PVEM (29) MC (16) PT (15) PANAL (10)
- Members: Mixed: 300 by plurality (single-member districts), 200 by proportional representation
- Chamber President: Jesús Murillo Karam (2012); Francisco Arroyo Vieyra (2012-2013); Ricardo Anaya (2013-2014); José González Morfin (2014); Silvano Aureoles Conejo (2014-2015); Tomás Torres Mercado (2015); Julio César Moreno Rivera (2015)

The LXII Legislature of the Congress of the Union, the 62nd session of the Congress of Mexico, met from September 1, 2012, to August 31, 2015. It consisted of Senators and Deputies in their respective chambers. All members of both the lower and upper houses of the Congress were elected in the elections of July 2012.

Senators were elected for a six-year term during the 2012 elections, allowing them to serve in both the LXII and subsequent legislatures. Deputies, also elected in the 2012 elections, served exclusively during the LXII Legislature.

The composition of the LXII Legislature was as follows:

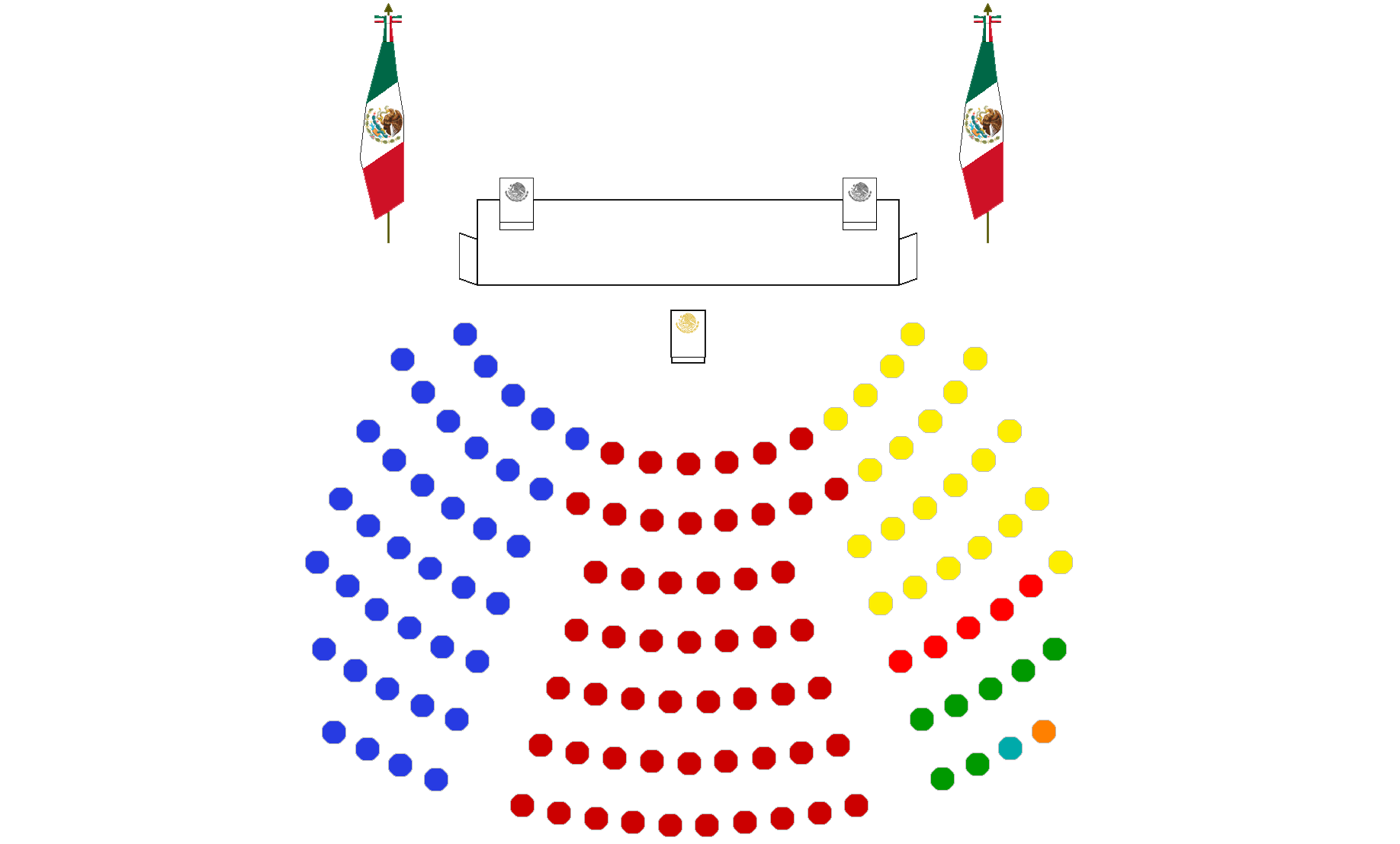
Composition of the Senate of Mexico, LXII Legislature

== Senate of the Republic ==
Members of the Senate of the Republic are elected for a term of six years. Each of the states elects three senators, complemented by an additional 32 senators selected from a national list, totaling 128 senators.

The composition of the Senate in the LXII Legislature is as follows:

=== Number of Senators by Political Party ===
For the internal governance of the Senate, senators are organized by the political party through which they were elected into parliamentary groups. Each group is led by a coordinator. The coordinators from all groups collectively form the Political Coordination Board of the Senate.

Party	Senators Plurality	Senators First minority	Senators Proportional Rep.	Total
PAN	16	13	9	38
PRI	30	11	11	52
PRD	11	5	6	22
PT	1	2	3	6
PVEM	6	1	2	9
MC	0	0	0	0
PANAL	0	0	1	1
Total	64	32	32	128
Source: Instituto Federal Electoral.

== Senate elections ==
The Institutional Revolutionary Party & the allied Green Party failed to gain a simple majority in either house. As a result, the PRI had to form crossparty coalitions in order to pass key reforms, particularly those requiring constitutional amendments. In the July 2012 elections the PRI gained 2 seats, ending with 52. The PAN gained 5 seats, ending with 38. The PRD lost 1 seat, ending with 22. The PVEM gained 1 seat, ending with 9. The Labor Party lost 1 seat, ending with 4. The PANAL lost 3, ending with 2 seats. The MC lost 3 seats, ending with 1.

=== By federal entity ===
State	Senator	Party	State	Senator	Party
Aguascalientes	Fernando Herrera Ávila	PAN	Morelos	Fidel Demédicis Hidalgo	PRD
Aguascalientes	Martín Orozco Sandoval	PAN	Morelos	Lisbeth Hernández Lecona	PRI
Aguascalientes	Miguel Romo Medina	PRI	Morelos	Rabindranath Salazar Solorio	PRD
Baja California	Marco Antonio Blásquez Salinas	PT	Nayarit	Manuel Humberto Cota Jiménez	PRI
Baja California	Víctor Hermosillo y Celada	PAN	Nayarit	Margarita Flores Sánchez	PRI
Baja California	Ernesto Ruffo Appel	PAN	Nayarit	Martha Elena García Gómez	PAN
Baja California Sur	Ángel Salvador Ceseña Burgoin Substitute for Ricardo Barroso Agramont	PRI	Nuevo León	Ivonne Liliana Álvarez	PRI
Baja California Sur	Ana Luisa Yuen Santa Ana Substitute for Isaías González Cuevas	PRI	Nuevo León	Raúl Gracia Guzmán	PAN
Baja California Sur	Carlos Mendoza Davis	PAN	Nuevo León	Marcela Guerra Castillo	PRI
Campeche	Jorge Luis Lavalle Maury	PAN	Oaxaca	Eviel Pérez Magaña	PRI
Campeche	Raúl Aarón Pozos	PRI	Oaxaca	Ángel Benjamín Robles	PRD
Campeche	Oscar Román Rosas	PRI	Oaxaca	Adolfo Romero Lainas	PRD
Chiapas	Roberto Albores Gleason	PRI	Puebla	Blanca Alcalá	PRI
Chiapas	Luis Armando Melgar Bravo	PVEM	Puebla	Javier Lozano Alarcón	PAN
Chiapas	Zoe Alejandro Robledo	PRD	Puebla	María Lucero Saldaña	PRI
Chihuahua	Javier Corral Jurado	PAN	Querétaro	Enrique Burgos García	PRI
Chihuahua	Patricio Martínez García	PRI	Querétaro	Francisco Domínguez Servién	PAN
Chihuahua	Lilia Merodio Reza	PRI	Querétaro	María Marcela Torres Peimbert	PAN
Coahuila	Braulio Manuel Fernández	PRI	Quintana Roo	Luz María Beristain	PRD
Coahuila	Silvia Guadalupe Garza	PAN	Quintana Roo	Félix Arturo González Canto	PRI
Coahuila	Luis Fernando Salazar Fernández	PAN	Quintana Roo	Jorge Emilio González Martínez	PVEM
Colima	Jorge Luis Preciado	PAN	San Luis Potosí	Sonia Mendoza Díaz	PAN
Colima	Itzel Ríos de la Mora	PRI	San Luis Potosí	César Octavio Pedroza Gaitán	PAN
Colima	Mely Romero Celis	PRI	San Luis Potosí	Teófilo Torres Corzo	PRI
Mexico City	Maria Alejandra Barrales	PRD	Sinaloa	Daniel Amador Gaxiola	PRI
Mexico City	Mario Martín Delgado	PRD	Sinaloa	Aarón Irízar López	PRI
Mexico City	Pablo Escudero Morales	PVEM	Sinaloa	Francisco Salvador López Brito	PAN
Durango	José Rosas Aispuro	PAN	Sonora	Francisco Búrquez	PAN
Durango	Ismael Hernández	PRI	Sonora	Ernesto Gándara Camou	PRI
Durango	Juana Leticia Herrera Ale	PRI	Sonora	Claudia Artemiza Pavlovich	PRI
Guanajuato	Miguel Angel Chico Herrera	PRI	Tabasco	Adán Augusto López	PRD
Guanajuato	Juan Carlos Romero Hicks	PAN	Tabasco	Fernando Enrique Mayans	PRD
Guanajuato	Fernando Torres Graciano	PAN	Tabasco	Humberto Domingo Mayans	PRI
Guerrero	René Juárez Cisneros	PRI	Tamaulipas	Manuel Cavazos Lerma	PRI
Guerrero	Misael Medrano Baza Substitute for Sofío Ramírez Hernández	PRD	Tamaulipas	Francisco Javier García Cabeza de Vaca	PAN
Guerrero	Armando Ríos Piter	PRD	Tamaulipas	Maki Esther Ortíz	PAN
Hidalgo	Omar Fayad	PRI	Tlaxcala	Lorena Cuéllar Cisneros	PRD
Hidalgo	Isidro Pedraza Chávez	PRD	Tlaxcala	Adriana Dávila Fernández	PAN
Hidalgo	David Penchyna Grub	PRI	Tlaxcala	Martha Palafox Gutiérrez	PT
Jalisco	Jesús Casillas Romero	PRI	Veracruz	Héctor Yunes Landa	PRI
Jalisco	María Verónica Martínez Espinoza; Replacing Arturo Zamora Jiménez	PRI	Veracruz	Fernando Yunes Márquez	PAN
Jalisco	Jose María Martínez Martínez	PAN	Veracruz	José Francisco Yunes Zorrilla	PRI
State of Mexico	Maria Elena Barrera	PVEM	Yucatán	Angélica Araujo Lara	PRI
State of Mexico	Alejandro de Jesús Encinas	PRD	Yucatán	Daniel Gabriel Ávila	PAN
State of Mexico	Ana Lilia Herrera Anzaldo	PRI	Yucatán	Rosa Adriana Díaz	PAN
Michoacán	Raúl Morón Orozco	PRD	Zacatecas	David Monreal Ávila	PT
Michoacán	José Ascención Orihuela	PRI	Zacatecas	Carlos Alberto Puente Salas	PVEM
Michoacán	María Pineda Gochi	PRI	Zacatecas	Alejandro Tello Cristerna	PRI

=== Plurinominal Senators ===
Senator	Party	Senator	Party
Monica Arriola Gordillo	PANAL	Arely Gómez González	PRI
Joel Ayala Almeida	PRI	Mariana Gómez del Campo	PAN
Luis Miguel Barbosa	PRD	Ana Guevara	PT
Manuel Bartlett Díaz	PT	Héctor Larios Córdova	PAN
Luisa María Calderón	PAN	Iris Vianey Mendoza	PRD
Víctor Manuel Camacho	PRD	Armando Neyra Chávez	PRI
Raúl Cervantes Andrade	PRI	María del Pilar Ortega Martínez; Replacing Alonso Lujambio	PAN
Ernesto Cordero Arroyo	PAN	Graciela Ortíz González	PRI
Gabriela Cuevas Barrón	PAN	María de los Dolores Padierna	PRD
Angélica De la Peña Gómez	PRD	Laura Angélica Rojas Hernández	PAN
María Cristina Díaz Salazar	PRI	Carlos Antonio Romero Deschamps	PRI
Hilda Esthela Flores Escalera	PRI	Ninfa Salinas Sada	PVEM
Juan Gerardo Flores Ramírez	PVEM	Gerardo Sánchez García	PRI
Emilio Antonio Gamboa	PRI	Venancio Luis Sánchez	PRD
Diva Hadamira Gastélum	PRI	Layda Elena Sansores	MC
Roberto Gil Zuarth	PAN	Salvador Vega Casillas	PAN

=== Presidents of the Senate during the LXII Legislature ===
- First year of session (2012–2013):
  - Ernesto Cordero Arroyo
- Second year of session (2013–2014):
  - Raúl Cervantes Andrade
- Third year of session (2014–2015):
  - Miguel Barbosa Huerta

=== Parliamentary coordinators ===
- National Action Party:
  - (2012–2013): Ernesto Cordero Arroyo
  - (2013–2015): Jorge Luis Preciado Rodríguez
  - (2015– ): Fernando Herrera Ávila
- Institutional Revolutionary Party:
  - Emilio Gamboa Patrón
- Party of the Democratic Revolution:
  - Miguel Barbosa Huerta
- Ecologist Green Party of Mexico:
  - Jorge Emilio González Martínez
- Labor Party:
  - Manuel Bartlett Díaz

== Chamber of Deputies elections ==
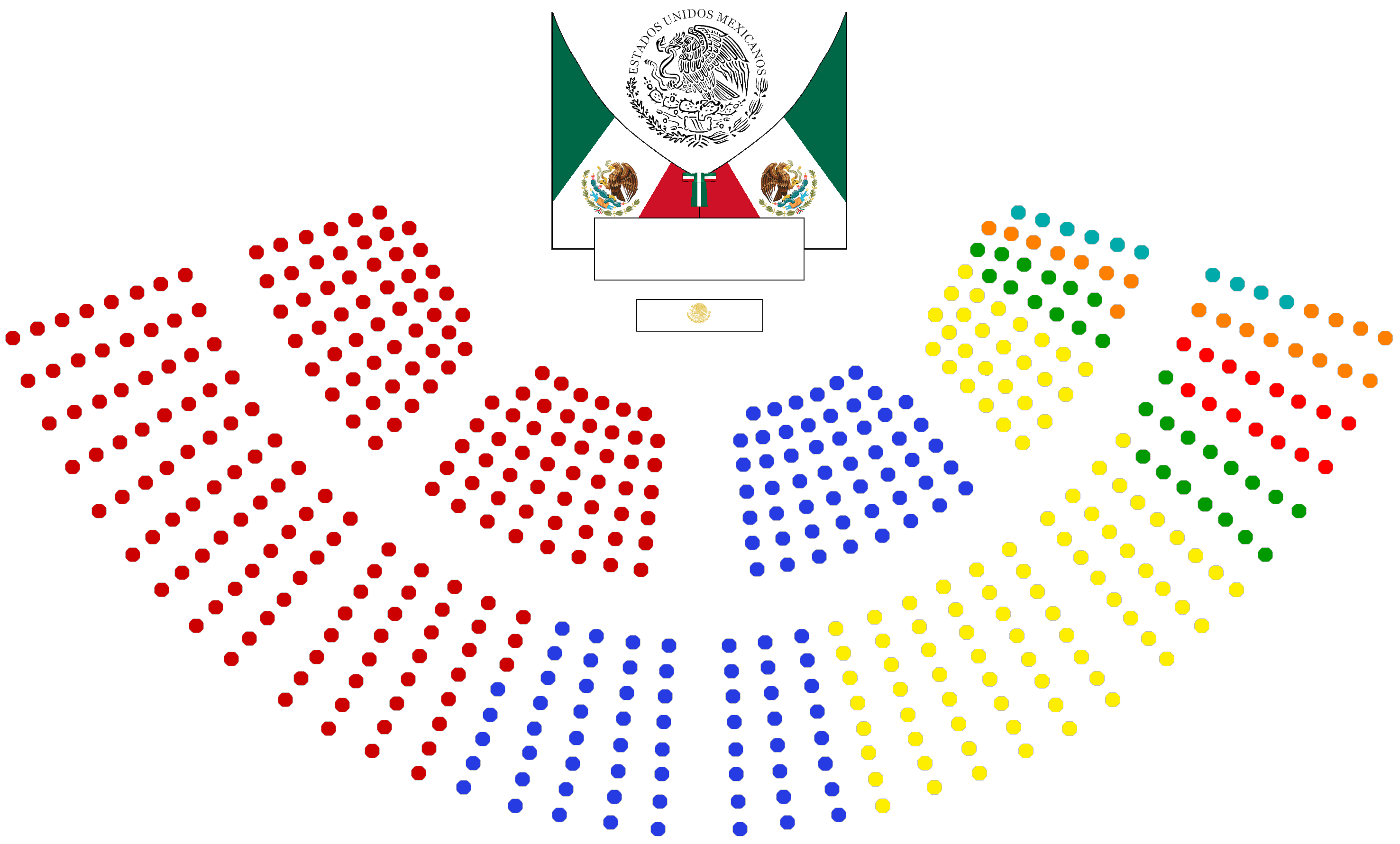
The Chamber of Deputies after the 2012 Mexican general election.

The Chamber of Deputies is composed of 500 legislators elected for a three-year term and not eligible for immediate reelection. 300 deputies are elected by direct vote in each of the federal electoral districts of the country, and the other 200 through a list system voted in each of the electoral constituencies.

The Institutional Revolutionary Party lost 32 seats, ending with 207. The PAN lost 28 seats, ending with 114. The PRD gained 31 seats, ending with 100. The Green Party gained 11 seats, ending with 34. The PT gained 6 seats, ending with 19. The New Alliance gained 3 seats, ending with 10. The Citizens Movement gained 10 seats, ending with 16. 1 independent seat was lost, and now there are none in the Chamber of Deputies.

=== Number of Deputies by political party ===
Party	Deputies Relative majority	Deputies Proportional representation	Total
PAN	52	62	114
PRI	163	49	212
PRD	60	44	104
PT	5	10	15
PVEM	14	15	29
MC	6	10	16
PANAL	0	10	10
Total	300	200	500
Source: Federal Electoral Institute.

== Deputies ==
=== Deputies by single-member district (relative majority) ===
State	District	Deputy	Party	State	District	Deputy	Party
Aguascalientes	1	J. Pilar Moreno Montoya		México	26	Fernando Zamora Morales	
Aguascalientes	2	María Teresa Jiménez Esquivel		México	27	Laura Barrera Fortoul	
Aguascalientes	3	José Ángel González Serna		México	28	Sue Ellen Bernal Bolnik	
Baja California	1	Benjamín Castillo Valdez		México	29	Valentín González Bautista	
Baja California	2	María Fernanda Schroeder Verdugo		México	30	Alliet Bautista Bravo	
Baja California	3	Gilberto Antonio Hirata Chico		México	31	Víctor Manuel Bautista López	
Baja California	4	María Elia Cabañas Aparicio		México	32	Arturo Cruz Ramírez	
Baja California	5	Juan Manuel Gastélum Buenrostro		México	33	Juan Manuel Carbajal Hernández	
Baja California	6	Chris López Alvarado		México	34	Norma González Vera Substitute for Alberto Curi Naime	
Baja California	7	David Pérez Tejada Padilla		México	35	Tanya Rellstab Carreto	
Baja California	8	Mayra Karina Robles Aguirre		México	36	Noé Barrueta Barón	
Baja California Sur	1	Francisco Pelayo Covarrubias		México	37	Francisco Javier Fernández Clamont	
Baja California Sur	2	Arturo De la Rosa Escalante		México	38	Jorge de la Vega Membrillo	
Campeche	1	Landy Margarita Berzunza Novelo		México	39	Cristina González Cruz	
Campeche	2	Rocío Abreu Artiñano		México	40	Gerardo Xavier Hernández Tapia	
Chiapas	1	Lourdes Adriana López Moreno		Michoacán	1	Rodimiro Barrera Estrada	
Chiapas	2	Pedro Gómez Gómez		Michoacán	2	Armando Contreras Ceballos	
Chiapas	3	Amílcar Augusto Villafuerte Trujillo		Michoacán	3	N/D Substitute for Silvano Aureoles Conejo	
Chiapas	4	Harvey Gutiérrez Álvarez		Michoacán	4	Salvador Romero Valencia	
Chiapas	5	Luis Gómez Gómez		Michoacán	5	Adriana Hernández Íñiguez	
Chiapas	6	Williams Oswaldo Ochoa Gallegos		Michoacán	6	Luis Olvera Correa	
Chiapas	7	Francisco Grajales Palacios		Michoacán	7	José Luis Esquivel Zalpa	
Chiapas	8	Eduardo Ramírez Aguilar		Michoacán	8	Eligio Cuitláhuac González Farías	
Chiapas	9	María del Rosario de Fátima Pariente Gavito		Michoacán	9	Socorro de la Luz Quintana León	
Chiapas	10	Héctor Narcia Álvarez		Michoacán	10	Ernesto Núñez Aguilar	
Chiapas	11	Hugo Mauricio Pérez Anzueto		Michoacán	11	Antonio García Conejo	
Chiapas	12	Antonio de Jesús Díaz Athié		Michoacán	12	Salvador Ortiz García	
Chihuahua	1	Adriana Fuentes Téllez		Morelos	1	José Francisco Coronato Rodríguez	
Chihuahua	2	Ignacio Duarte Murillo		Morelos	2	Javier Orihuela García	
Chihuahua	3	Carlos Angulo Parra		Morelos	3	Francisco Rodríguez Montero	
Chihuahua	4	Luis Murguía Lardizábal		Morelos	4	Andrés Eloy Martínez Rojas	
Chihuahua	5	Abraham Montes Alvarado		Morelos	5	Víctor Reymundo Nájera Medina	
Chihuahua	6	Minerva Castillo Rodríguez		Nayarit	1	Juan Manuel Rocha Piedra	
Chihuahua	7	Kamel Athié Flores		Nayarit	2	Roy Gómez Olguín	
Chihuahua	8	Pedro Ignacio Domínguez Zepeda		Nayarit	3	Gloria Núñez Sánchez	
Chihuahua	9	Karina Velázquez Ramírez		Nuevo León	1	Homero Niño de Rivera Vela	
Coahuila	1	María de Lourdes Flores Treviño Substitute for Irma Elizondo Ramírez		Nuevo León	2	Bénito Caballero Garza	
Coahuila	2	José Luis Flores Méndez		Nuevo León	3	Abel Guerra Garza	
Coahuila	3	Mario Alberto Dávila Delgado		Nuevo León	4	Ricardo Flores Suárez Substitute for Víctor Fuentes Solís	
Coahuila	4	Fernando de las Fuentes Hernández		Nuevo León	5	Héctor Gutiérrez De la Garza	
Coahuila	5	Salomón Juan Marcos Issa		Nuevo León	6	Alberto Coronado Quintanilla	
Coahuila	6	Marcelo Torres Cofiño		Nuevo León	7	Martín López Cisneros	
Coahuila	7	Esther Quintana Salinas		Nuevo León	8	Alfonso Robledo Leal	
Colima	1	Miguel Ángel Aguayo López		Nuevo León	9	Marco Antonio González Valdez	
Colima	2	Francisco Alberto Zepeda González		Nuevo León	10	Fernando Larrazábal Bretón	
Mexico City	1	Lizbeth Rosas Montero		Nuevo León	11	Héctor García García	
Mexico City	2	Manuel Huerta Ladrón de Guevara		Nuevo León	12	Pedro Pablo Treviño Villarreal	
Mexico City	3	Fernando Cuéllar Reyes		Oaxaca	1	José Soto Martínez	
Mexico City	4	Carlos Augusto Morales López		Oaxaca	2	Juan Luis Martínez Martínez	
Mexico City	5	José Antonio Hurtado Gallegos		Oaxaca	3	Gloria Bautista Cuevas	
Mexico City	6	Jhonatan Jardines Fraire		Oaxaca	4	Eva Diego Cruz	
Mexico City	7	Claudia Elena Águila Torres		Oaxaca	5	Carol Antonio Altamirano	
Mexico City	8	Alejandro Carbajal González		Oaxaca	6	Rosa Elia Romero Guzmán	
Mexico City	9	Israel Moreno Rivera		Oaxaca	7	Samuel Gurrión Matías	
Mexico City	10	Agustín Barrios Gómez Segues		Oaxaca	8	Hugo Jarquín	
Mexico City	11	Luis Espinosa Cházaro		Oaxaca	9	Mario Rafael Méndez Martínez	
Mexico City	12	José Luis Muñóz Soria		Oaxaca	10	Aída Fabiola Valencia Ramírez	
Mexico City	13	Carlos Reyes Gámiz		Oaxaca	11	Delfina Guzmán Díaz	
Mexico City	14	Martha Lucía Mícher Camarena		Puebla	1	Laura Guadalupe Vargas Vargas	
Mexico City	15	Jorge Francisco Sotomayor Chávez		Puebla	2	José Luis Márquez Martínez	
Mexico City	16	Mario Miguel Carrillo Huerta		Puebla	3	Víctor Emanuel Díaz Palacios	
Mexico City	17	Fernando Zárate Salgado		Puebla	4	Josefina García Hernández	
Mexico City	18	Karen Quiroga Anguiano		Puebla	5	Carlos Sánchez Romero	
Mexico City	19	Aleida Alavez Ruiz		Puebla	6	Enrique Doger Guerrero	
Mexico City	20	José Benavides Castañeda		Puebla	7	Jesús Morales Flores	
Mexico City	21	Hugo Sandoval Martínez Substitute for Alejandro Sánchez Camacho		Puebla	8	Ana Isabel Allende Cano	
Mexico City	22	Purificación Carpinteyro		Puebla	9	Blanca Jiménez Castillo	
Mexico City	23	José Valentín Maldonado Salgado		Puebla	10	Julio César Lorenzini Rangel	
Mexico City	24	Gerardo Villanueva Albarrán		Puebla	11	María Isabel Ortiz Mantilla	
Mexico City	25	María de Lourdes Amaya Reyes		Puebla	12	Néstor Octavio Gordillo Castillo	
Mexico City	26	José Arturo López Cándido		Puebla	13	María del Rocío García Olmedo	
Mexico City	27	Guadalupe Flores Salazar		Puebla	14	Javier Filiberto Guevara González	
Durango	1	Sonia Catalina Mercado Gallegos		Puebla	15	María del Carmen García de la Cadena Romero	
Durango	2	Marina Vitela Rodríguez		Puebla	16	Lisandro Campos Córdova	
Durango	3	José Rubén Escajeda Jiménez		Querétaro	1	Delvim Fabiola Bárcenas Nieves	
Durango	4	Eduardo Solís Nogueira Substitute following the death of Jorge Herrera Delgado		Querétaro	2	Ricardo Astudillo Suárez	
Guanajuato	1	Petra Barrera Barrera		Querétaro	3	Marcos Aguilar Vega	
Guanajuato	2	Ricardo Villarreal García		Querétaro	4	José Guadalupe García Ramírez	
Guanajuato	3	Elizabeth Vargas Martín del Campo		Quintana Roo	1	Román Quian Alcocer	
Guanajuato	4	María Esther Garza Moreno		Quintana Roo	2	Raymundo King de la Rosa	
Guanajuato	5	Diego Sinhue Rodríguez Vallejo		Quintana Roo	3	Graciela Saldaña Fraire	
Guanajuato	6	Rosa Elba Pérez Hernández		San Luis Potosí	1	José Everardo Nava Gómez	
Guanajuato	7	María Guadalupe Velázquez Díaz		San Luis Potosí	2	Esther Angélica Martínez Cárdenas	
Guanajuato	8	Genaro Carreño Muro		San Luis Potosí	3	Óscar Bautista Villegas	
Guanajuato	9	Alejandro Rangel Segovia		San Luis Potosí	4	Jorge Terán Juárez	
Guanajuato	10	Raúl Gómez Ramírez		San Luis Potosí	5	Xavier Azuara Zúñiga	
Guanajuato	11	Ma. Concepción Navarrete Vital		San Luis Potosí	6	Felipe de Jesús Almaguer Torres	
Guanajuato	12	Felipe Arturo Camarena García		San Luis Potosí	7	María Rebeca Terán Guevara	
Guanajuato	13	J. Jesús Oviedo Herrera		Sinaloa	1	Román Alfredo Padilla Fierro	
Guanajuato	14	José Luis Oliveros Usabiaga		Sinaloa	2	Gerardo Peña Avilés	
Guerrero	1	Catalino Duarte Ortuño		Sinaloa	3	Alfonso Inzunza Montoya	
Guerrero	2	Marino Miranda Salgado		Sinaloa	4	Blas Ramón Rubio Lara	
Guerrero	3	Silvano Blanco de Aquino		Sinaloa	5	Jesús Antonio Valdés Palazuelos	
Guerrero	4	Víctor Manuel Jorrín Lozano		Sinaloa	6	Francisca Elena Corrales Corrales	
Guerrero	5	Vicario Portillo Martínez		Sinaloa	7	Sergio Torres Félix	
Guerrero	6	Carlos de Jesús Alejandro		Sinaloa	8	Martín Alonso Heredia Lizárraga	
Guerrero	7	Jorge Salgado Parra		Sonora	1	José Enrique Reina Lizárraga	
Guerrero	8	Sebastián de la Rosa Peláez		Sonora	2	David Cuauhtémoc Galindo Delgado	
Guerrero	9	Rosario Merlín García		Sonora	3	Alejandra López Noriega	
Hidalgo	1	Darío Badillo Ramírez		Sonora	4	Antonio Astiazarán Gutiérrez	
Hidalgo	2	Dulce María Muñiz Martínez		Sonora	5	Damián Zepeda Vidales	
Hidalgo	3	Víctor Hugo Velasco Orozco		Sonora	6	Faustino Francisco Félix Chávez	
Hidalgo	4	Emilse Miranda Munive		Sonora	7	Máximo Othón Zayas	
Hidalgo	5	José Antonio Rojo García de Alba		Tabasco	1	Claudia Elizabeth Bojórquez Javier	
Hidalgo	6	Mirna Hernández Morales		Tabasco	2	Tomás Brito Lara	
Hidalgo	7	Francisco González Vargas		Tabasco	3	Lorena Méndez Denis	
Jalisco	1	Cesáreo Padilla Navarro		Tabasco	4	Gerardo Gaudiano Rovirosa	
Jalisco	2	José Noel Pérez de Alba		Tabasco	5	Marcos Rosendo Medina Filigrana	
Jalisco	3	Cecilia González Gómez		Tabasco	6	Antonio Sansores Sastré	
Jalisco	4	Salvador Arellano Guzmán		Tamaulipas	1	Glafiro Salinas Mendiola	
Jalisco	5	Rafael González Reséndiz		Tamaulipas	2	Humberto Armando Prieto Herrera	
Jalisco	6	Abel Salgado Peña		Tamaulipas	3	José Alejandro Llanas Alba	
Jalisco	7	Sergio Armando Chávez Dávalos		Tamaulipas	4	Carlos Alberto García González	
Jalisco	8	Leobardo Alcalá Padilla		Tamaulipas	5	Enrique Cárdenas del Avellano	
Jalisco	9	Ma. Leticia Mendoza Curiel		Tamaulipas	6	Rosalba de la Cruz Requeña	
Jalisco	10	Bernardo Guzmán Cervantes Substitute for Omar Borboa Becerra		Tamaulipas	7	Marcelina Orta Coronado	
Jalisco	11	Claudia Delgadillo González		Tamaulipas	8	Germán Pacheco Díaz	
Jalisco	12	Celia Isabel Gauna Ruiz de León		Tlaxcala	1	María Guadalupe Sánchez Santiago	
Jalisco	13	Marco Antonio Barba Mariscal		Tlaxcala	2	José Humberto Vega Vázquez	
Jalisco	14	Enrique Aubry de Castro		Tlaxcala	3	Edilberto Algredo Jaramillo	
Jalisco	15	Ossiel Omar Niaves López		Veracruz	1	Zita Beatriz Pazzi Maza	
Jalisco	16	Luis Armando Córdova Díaz		Veracruz	2	Leopoldo Sánchez Cruz	
Jalisco	17	María Angélica Magaña Zepeda		Veracruz	3	Genaro Ruiz Arriaga	
Jalisco	18	Ignacio Mestas Gallardo Substitute for Gabriel Gómez Michel		Veracruz	4	Humberto Alonso Morelli	
Jalisco	19	Salvador Barajas del Toro		Veracruz	5	Gaudencio Hernández Burgos	
State of Mexico	1	Miguel Sámano Peralta		Veracruz	6	Alma Jeanny Arroyo Ruiz	
State of Mexico	2	Gerardo Liceaga Arteaga		Veracruz	7	Verónica Carreón Cervantes	
State of Mexico	3	José Rangel Espinosa		Veracruz	8	José Alejandro Montaño Guzmán	
State of Mexico	4	Angelina Carreño Mijares		Veracruz	9	Fernando Charleston Hernández	
State of Mexico	5	Darío Zacarías Capuchino		Veracruz	10	Uriel Flores Aguayo	
State of Mexico	6	Roberto Ruíz Moronatti		Veracruz	11	Joaquín Caballero Rosiñol	
State of Mexico	7	Alejandra del Moral Vela		Veracruz	12	Rafael Acosta Croda	
State of Mexico	8	Marco Antonio Calzada Arroyo		Veracruz	13	Víctor Serralde Martínez	
State of Mexico	9	José Manzur Quiroga		Veracruz	14	Noé Hernández González	
State of Mexico	10	José Luis Cruz Flores Gómez		Veracruz	15	Juan Manuel Diez Francos	
State of Mexico	11	Brenda Alvarado Sánchez		Veracruz	16	Leticia López Landero	
State of Mexico	12	César Reynaldo Navarro de Alba		Veracruz	17	Gabriel de Jesús Cárdenas Guizar	
State of Mexico	13	José Isidro Moreno Árcega		Veracruz	18	Tomás López Landero	
State of Mexico	14	Silvia Márquez Velasco		Veracruz	19	Mariana Garay Cabada	
State of Mexico	15	Alberto Díaz Trujillo		Veracruz	20	Regina Vázquez Saut	
State of Mexico	16	Norma Ponce Orozco		Veracruz	21	Ponciano Vázquez Parissi	
State of Mexico	17	Jessica Salazar Trejo		Yucatán	1	William Renan Sosa Altamira	
State of Mexico	18	Fernando Maldonado Hernández		Yucatán	2	María del Carmen Ordaz Martínez	
State of Mexico	19	Aurora Denisse Ugalde Alegría		Yucatán	3	Mauricio Sahuí Rivero	
State of Mexico	20	Joaquina Navarrete Contreras		Yucatán	4	Raúl Paz Alonzo	
State of Mexico	21	Cristina Ruiz Sandoval		Yucatán	5	Marco Alonso Vela Reyes	
State of Mexico	22	Rosalba Gualito Castañeda		Zacatecas	1	Adolfo Bonilla Gómez	
State of Mexico	23	Blanca Estela Gómez Carmona		Zacatecas	2	Julio César Flemate Ramírez	
State of Mexico	24	Irazema González Martínez Olivares		Zacatecas	3	Judit Guerrero López	
State of Mexico	25	Jesús Tolentino Román Bojórquez		Zacatecas	4	Bárbara Romo Fonseca	

=== Deputies by proportional representation ===
Constituency	Deputy	Party	Constituency	Deputy	Party
First	Andrés de la Rosa Anaya		Third	Lizbeth Gamboa Song	
First	Alfredo Zamora García		Third	Yazmín Copete Zapot	
First	Rocío Reza Gallegos		Third	José Antonio León Mendívil	
First	Rodolfo Dorador Pérez Gavilán		Third	María Guadalupe Moctezuma Oviedo	
First	Isaías Cortés Berumen		Third	Roberto López Rosado Substitute for Gabriel López Rosado	
First	Margarita Licea González		Third	Saraí Larisa León Montero Substitute for Angélica Rocío Melchor Vásquez	
First	Lucía Pérez Camarena		Third	Rosendo Serrano Toledo	
First	María Celia Urciel Castañeda		Third	Juan Manuel Fócil Pérez	
First	Carlos Castaños Valenzuela		Third	María Fernanda Romero Lozano	
First	Tania Morgan Navarrete		Third	Teresita de Jesús Borges Pasos	
First	Jorge Villalobos Seáñez		Third	Mario Alejandro Cuevas Mena	
First	Heberto Neblina Vega		Third	Federico José González Luna	
First	Leslie Pantoja Hernández		Third	Raciel López Salazar	
First	Mario Sánchez Ruiz		Third	Martha Edith Vital Vera	
First	Vacant Due to leave of Manlio Fabio Beltrones		Third	Gabriela Medrano Galindo	
First	Adán David Ruiz Gutiérrez Substitute for Fernando Castro Trenti		Third	Araceli Torres Flores	
First	María Carmen López Segura Substitute for María Elvia Amaya Araujo		Third	Héctor Hugo Roblero Gordillo	
First	Lourdes Quiñones Canales		Third	Nelly del Carmen Vargas Pérez	
First	Rocío Corona Nakamura		Third	José Angelino Caamal Mena	
First	Patricio Flores Sandoval		Third	Sonia Rincón Chanona	
First	Heriberto Galindo Quiñones		Fourth	Maximiliano Cortázar Lara	
First	Raúl Santos Galván Villanueva		Fourth	Flor de María Pedraza Aguilera	
First	Flor de Rosa Ayala Robles Linares		Fourth	Fernando Rodríguez Doval	
First	Patricia Retamoza Vega		Fourth	Margarita Saldaña Hernández	
First	Ricardo Pacheco Rodríguez		Fourth	Juan Pablo Adame Alemán	
First	Crystal Tovar Aragón		Fourth	Luis Miguel Ramírez Romero	
First	Lorenia Valles Sampedro		Fourth	Rafael Alejandro Micalco Méndez	
First	Rodrigo González Barrios		Fourth	Aurora de la Luz Aguilar Rodríguez	
First	Verónica Juárez Piña		Fourth	Leonor Romero Sevilla	
First	Roberto López González		Fourth	Carlos Aceves del Olmo	
First	Ana Lilia Garza Cadena		Fourth	Felipe Muñoz Kapamas	
First	Rubén Acosta Montoya		Fourth	Paloma Villaseñor Vargas	
First	Héctor Mares Cossío Substitute for Jaime Bonilla Valdez		Fourth	Manuel Añorve Baños	
First	Lilia Aguilar Gil		Fourth	Maricela Velázquez Sánchez	
First	José Luis Valle Magaña		Fourth	Frine Soraya Córdova Morán	
First	Alfonso Durazo Montaño		Fourth	Javier López Zavala	
First	Merilyn Gómez Pozos		Fourth	Luis Manuel Arias Pallares	
First	Beatriz Córdova Bernal		Fourth	José Ángel Ávila Pérez	
First	Rubén Félix Hays		Fourth	Rodrigo Chávez Contreras Substitute for Martí Batres Guadarrama	
First	Dora María Talamante Lemas		Fourth	Fernando Belaunzarán Méndez	
Second	Luis Alberto Villarreal García		Fourth	Amalia García	
Second	Rubén Camarillo Ortega		Fourth	Trinidad Morales Vargas	
Second	Raudel López López		Fourth	Julio César Moreno Rivera	
Second	Guillermo Anaya Llamas		Fourth	Yesenia Nolasco Ramírez	
Second	Juan Carlos Muñoz Márquez		Fourth	Guillermo Sánchez Torres	
Second	Beatriz Yamamoto Cázares		Fourth	Elena Tapia Fonllem	
Second	Elizabeth Yáñez Robles		Fourth	Teresa de Jesús Mojica Morga	
Second	Consuelo Argüelles Loya		Fourth	Gisela Mota Ocampo	
Second	Verónica Sada Pérez		Fourth	Roxana Luna Porquillo	
Second	José Arturo Salinas Garza		Fourth	Arturo Escobar y Vega	
Second	Ana Paola López Birlain Substitute for Ricardo Anaya Cortés		Fourth	Laura Ximena Martel Cantú	
Second	José Alfredo Botello Montes		Fourth	Ruth Zavaleta Salgado	
Second	Raquel Jiménez Cerrillo		Fourth	Adolfo Orive Bellinger	
Second	Enrique Alejandro Flores Flores		Fourth	Loretta Ortiz Ahlf	
Second	María Concepción Ramírez Diez Gutiérrez		Fourth	Ricardo Monreal Ávila	
Second	María Eugenia de León Pérez Substitute for Nelly González Aguilar		Fourth	Zuleyma Huidobro González	
Second	Ramón Antonio Sampayo Ortiz		Fourth	Ricardo Mejía Berdeja	
Second	José Isabel Trejo Reyes		Fourth	Luisa María Alcalde Luján	
Second	Eloy Cantú Segovia		Fourth	René Fujiwara Montelongo	
Second	María de Jesús Huerta Rea		Fourth	Cristina Olvera Barrios	
Second	Jorge Mendoza Garza		Fifth	Patricia Lugo Barriga	
Second	César Agustín Serna Escalera Substitute for Javier Treviño Cantú		Fifth	Martha Sosa Govea	
Second	Elsa Patricia Araujo de la Torre		Fifth	Erick Rivera Villanueva	
Second	Marco Antonio Bernal Gutiérrez		Fifth	Adriana González Carrillo	
Second	Amira Gómez Tueme		Fifth	Karina Labastida Sotelo	
Second	Francisco Arroyo Vieyra		Fifth	Ma. Guadalupe Mondragón González	
Second	Ma. Elena Cano Ayala		Fifth	Alfredo Rivadeneyra Hernández	
Second	Miriam Cárdenas Cantú		Fifth	Juan Carlos Uribe Padilla	
Second	Roberto López Suárez		Fifth	Martha Berenice Álvarez Tovar	
Second	Alfa González Magallanes		Fifth	José González Morfín	
Second	María del Socorro Ceseñas Chapa		Fifth	José Alberto Rodríguez Calderón Substitute for Jesús Murillo Karam	
Second	Marcelo Garza Ruvalcaba		Fifth	Martha Gutiérrez Manrique Substitute for Nuvia Mayorga Delgado	
Second	Miguel Alonso Raya		Fifth	Arnoldo Ochoa González	
Second	Tomás Torres Mercado		Fifth	Brasil Acosta Peña	
Second	Antonio Cuéllar Steffan		Fifth	Leticia Calderón Ramírez	
Second	Mónica García de la Fuente		Fifth	Maricruz Cruz Morales	
Second	Magdalena Núñez Monreal		Fifth	Erika Yolanda Funes Velázquez	
Second	Alberto Anaya		Fifth	Raúl Macías Sandoval	
Second	Fernando Bribiesca Sahagún		Fifth	Fernando Salgado Delgado	
Second	María Sanjuana Cerda Franco		Fifth	Alfredo Anaya Gudiño	
Third	Jorge Rosiñol Abreu		Fifth	Blanca Ma. Villaseñor Gudiño	
Third	Juan Jesús Aquino Calvo		Fifth	Juana Bonilla Jaime	
Third	Eufrosina Cruz Mendoza		Fifth	Ángel Cedillo Hernández	
Third	Víctor Rafael González Manríquez		Fifth	Ramón Montalvo Hernández	
Third	Alicia Ricalde Magaña		Fifth	Pedro Porras Pérez	
Third	Francisco Cáceres de la Fuente		Fifth	Domitilo Posadas Hernández	
Third	Juan Bueno Torio		Fifth	Carla Guadalupe Reyes Montiel	
Third	Mariana Dunyaska García Rojas		Fifth	Javier Salinas Narváez	
Third	Sergio Augusto Chan Lugo		Fifth	Josefina Salinas Pérez	
Third	Cinthya Noemí Valladares Couoh		Fifth	Verónica García Reyes	
Third	Beatriz Zavala Peniche		Fifth	Víctor Manuel Manríquez González	
Third	Ricardo Aldana Prieto		Fifth	Julisa Mejía Guardado	
Third	Jorge del Ángel Acosta		Fifth	Nabor Ochoa López	
Third	María de las Nieves García Fernández		Fifth	Javier Orozco Gómez	
Third	Martín de Jesús Vásquez Villanueva		Fifth	Carla Alicia Padilla Ramos	
Third	Areli Madrid Tovilla		Fifth	Ricardo Cantú Garza	
Third	Simón Valanci Buzali		Fifth	Ma. del Carmen Martínez Santillán	
Third	Alejandro Moreno Cárdenas		Fifth	Juan Ignacio Samperio Montaño	
Third	Elvia María Pérez Escalante		Fifth	Lucila Garfias Gutiérrez	
Third	Guadalupe del Socorro Ortega Pacheco		Fifth	Luis Antonio González Roldán	

=== Presidents of the Chamber of Deputies during the LXII Legislature ===
- (2012): Jesús Murillo Karam
- (2012–2013): Francisco Arroyo Vieyra
- (2013–2014): Ricardo Anaya Cortés
- (2014): José González Morfín
- (2014–2015): Silvano Aureoles Conejo
- (2015): Tomás Torres Mercado
- (2015): Julio César Moreno Rivera

=== Parliamentary coordinators ===
- National Action Party:
  - (2012–2014): Luis Alberto Villarreal García
  - (2014–2015): José Isabel Trejo Reyes
  - (2015): Ricardo Anaya Cortés
  - (2015– ): Marcelo Torres Cofiño
- Institutional Revolutionary Party:
  - Manlio Fabio Beltrones
- Party of the Democratic Revolution:
  - (2012–2014): Silvano Aureoles Conejo
  - (2014– ): Miguel Alonso Raya
- Ecologist Green Party of Mexico:
  - Arturo Escobar y Vega
- Labor Party:
  - Alberto Anaya
- Citizens' Movement:
  - (2012–2014): Ricardo Monreal Ávila
  - (2014– ): Juan Ignacio Samperio Montaño
- New Alliance:
  - Lucila Garfias Gutiérrez

== See also ==
- Politics of Mexico

Preceded by 61st Legislature	62nd Legislature; September 2012 to August 2015	Succeeded by 63rd Legislature
