= Senator Martinez =

Senator Martinez (or Martínez) may refer to:

== Argentina ==
- Alfredo Martínez (politician) (born 1951), senator for Santa Cruz in 2005–2017
- Ernesto Félix Martínez (born 1956), senator for Córdoba in 2015–2021
- José Carlos Martínez (politician) (1962–2011), senator for Tierra del Fuego in 2007–2011
- Julio Martínez (Argentine politician) (born 1962), senator for La Rioja in 2017–2023
- María Rosa Martínez (born 1955), member of the Buenos Aires Provincial Senate since 2023

== Chile ==
- Carlos Alberto Martínez (politician) (1885–1972)
- Ignacio Martínez Urrutia (fl. 1930s)

== Mexico ==
- Alberto Miguel Martínez Mireles (born 1950), senator for San Luis Potosí in 1982–1988
- Alfonso Martínez Domínguez (1922–2002), senator for Nuevo León in 1988–1994, national-list senator in 1997–2000
- Germán Martínez Cázares (born 1967), national-list senator in 2018–2024
- Gonzalo Martínez Corbalá (1928–2017), senator for San Luis Potosí in 2000–2006
- Higinio Martínez (born 1956), senator for the State of Mexico since 2018
- Ifigenia Martínez (1925–2024), national-list senator in 2018–2024
- Irma Martínez Manríquez, national-list senator in 2007–2010
- Jose María Martínez Martínez (born 1972), senator for Jalisco in 2012–2018
- María Verónica Martínez Espinoza (born 1949), senator for Jalisco in 2013–2018
- Mayuli Martínez (born 1984), senator for Quintana Roo since 2018
- Patricio Martínez García (born 1948), senator for Chihuahua in 2012–2018
- Sylvia Martínez Elizondo (1947–2020), senator for Chihuahua in 2016–2018

== Paraguay ==
- Esperanza Martínez (politician) (born 1959), senator since 2013

== Spain ==
- Ana Martínez Zaragoza (born 1981), senator for Alicante since 2019
- Antonio Martínez Rodríguez (born 1980), senator for Almería since 2020
- Isidro Martínez Oblanca (born 1956), senator for Asturias in 1996–2004 and 2011–2015

== United States and territories ==
- Ángel Chayanne Martínez (born 1964), Senate of Puerto Rico
- Frank Martínez (politician) (1884–1966), Senate of Puerto Rico
- Iris Martinez (born 1956), Illinois State Senate
- Mel Martínez (born 1946), U.S. senator from Florida in 2005–2009
- Monica Martinez (born 1977), New York State Senate
- Rafael Martínez Nadal (1877–1941), Senate of Puerto Rico
- Richard Martinez (politician) (born 1953), New Mexico State Senate

== Uruguay ==
- Rubén Martínez Huelmo (1949–2025), senator in 2015–2020
