= María Ramírez =

María Ramírez may refer to:

- María Elena Ramírez, Mexican gymnast
- María Lorena Ramírez, indigenous long-distance runner
- María Teresa Ramírez, Mexican swimmer
- Maria Teresa Ramirez-Giraldo, Colombian economist

== See also ==
- María Ramírez Diez, Mexican politician
- María Portillo Ramírez, Mexican tennis player
