= Mario Sanchez =

Mario Sanchez may refer to:

- Mario Sanchez (artist), Cuban-American folk artist
- Mario Sánchez (football manager), Spanish football manager
- Mario Sánchez (footballer), Mexican footballer
- Mario Sánchez (sport shooter), Mexican sport shooter
- Mario Sánchez (squash player), Mexican squash player
- Mario Sanchez (soccer), retired American soccer forward
- Mario Ernesto Sánchez, actor and theater founder
- Mario Sánchez Ruiz (born 1961), Mexican former politician
- Mario Sánchez Yantén (born 1956), retired Chilean football referee
- Mario Sanchez (baseball) (born 1994), Venezuelan professional baseball pitcher
