= José Ignacio Seara Sierra =

Mexican politician

Member of the Chamber of Deputies for Campeche
- In office 29 August 2009 – 31 August 2012

Municipal president of Ciudad del Carmen
- In office 2006–2009
- Preceded by: Jorge Rosiñol Abreu
- Succeeded by: Guadalupe del Carmen López Hernández

Member of the Congress of Campeche from the 9th district
- In office 1994–1997
- Preceded by: José Antonio Ramírez Thomás
- Succeeded by: Luis Carlos Basto

Personal details
- Born: 6 August 1959 (age 67) Ciudad del Carmen, Campeche, Mexico
- Party: PAN
- Education: Mérida Institute of Technology

José Ignacio Seara Sierra (born 6 August 1959) is a Mexican politician from the National Action Party. From 2009 to 2012 he served as Deputy of the LXI Legislature of the Mexican Congress representing Campeche.
