= Valladares =

Valladares (or Valadares in Portuguese and Galician) is a notable family name originating in the ancient land of Valadares, situated next to Melgaço. It is the northernmost municipality in Portugal, on the south bank of the Minho River, which separates Portugal and Galicia. Because of the proximity of northern Portugal and Galicia, the early Valadares can be found on both sides of the border. The first titled member of the Valladares nobility in Galicia was Luis Sarmiento de Valladares, the first viscount of Meira in 1669 and first marquis de Valladares 1673, the latter title granted by King Charles II of Spain in the second half of the 17th century. The Valladares family are also very popular in Central America specifically in Honduras, El Salvador, Mexico and in Brazil as well (although the surname is Valadares in Portuguese).

== Valladares nobility of Galicia ==
The Valladares family originated in the ancient kingdom of Spain in the northwestern province of Galicia, and the northernmost municipality of Portugal, and so we can find members of the Valladares family on both sides of the Minho river that divides Spain & Portugal. The family was able to establish themselves in other regions of Spain and become influential members of their communities.

One of the earliest Valadares recorded was the nobleman Soeiro Aires de Valadares, son of Arias Núñez de Valadares and Ximena Núñez, both from Galicia. Soeiro was a member of the curia regis of King Alfonso Henriques and appears in royal charters from 1169 to 1179. Soeiro's first wife was Elvira Nunes Velho. He later married Maria Alfonso, an illegitimate daughter of King Alfonso IX of León and his mistress Teresa Gil de Soverosa, who had first married Álvaro Fernández de Lara, and later the concubine of her nephew King Alfonso X of Castile, and then married her second husband Suero Arias de Valladares. Also a member of this family was Aldonça Lourenço de Valadares, the mother of Ines de Castro.

The Valladares noble families aided the Catholic Monarchs of Spain in 1492, in the Reconquista in which Christian troops under orders of King Ferdinand and Queen Isabella reconquered Spain and expelled the invading Muslims in the year 1492. They were granted nobility by the Order of Santiago in 1624, and by the Order of Alcantara in 1659. The first titled member of the Valladares nobility in Galicia was Luis Sarmiento de Valladares, the first viscount of Meira in 1669 and first marquis de Valladares 1673, the latter title granted by King Charles II of Spain in the second half of the 17th century.

== Notable people ==
- Acisclo Valladares Urruela, Guatemalan attorney, notary and criminal
- Alfredo Valladares (born 1958), Cuban rower
- Alvaro Fernández de Valladares (died 1212), Spanish military commander
- Antônio Carlos Valadares (born 1943), Brazilian politician
- Antonio Valladares de Sotomayor (1737–1820), Spanish journalist, poet, playwright and writer
- Armando Valladares (born 1937), Cuban-American poet, diplomat and political prisoner
- Carmen Gloria Valladares (born 1954), Chilean judge
- Cinthya Valladares Couoh (born 1981), Mexican politician
- Crescencio Gómez Valladares (1833–1921), President of Honduras
- Daniel Valladares (born 1995), Mexican boxer
- Diego Sarmiento Valladares (1615–1695), Spanish bishop
- Guido Valadares (1934–1976), Timorese politician and activist
- Ivan Valladares (born 1965), Peruvian wrestler
- Jadier Valladares (born 1982), Cuban weightlifter
- John Valladares (born 1980), Chilean football manager and player
- José Sarmiento de Valladares, 1st Duke of Atrisco (1643–1708), Spanish viceroy
- Juan Valladares (born 1947), Honduran long-distance runner
- Leda Valladares (1919–2012), Argentine singer, songwriter, musicologist, folklorist and poet
- Luis Valadares Tavares (born 1946), Portuguese professor
- Manuel Portela Valladares (1867–1952), Spanish politician
- Manuel Valadares (1904–1982), Portuguese atomic and nuclear physicist
- Marcos Valadares (born 1977), Brazilian football coach
- María Zavala Valladares (born 1956), Peruvian politician, lawyer and judge
- Melvin Valladares (born 1984), Honduran footballer
- Noel Valladares (born 1977), Honduran footballer
- Patricio Valladares (born 1982), Chilean film director, screenwriter and comic book writer
- Rafael Valladares (born 1962), Honduran racewalker
- Ralph Valladares (1936–1998), Guatemalan roller derby skater and coach
- Suzette Martinez Valladares (born 1980), American politician
- Tomás Valladares (1780–1850s), Nicaraguan politician and brigadier
- Yolanda Valladares (born 1959), Mexican politician

== Bibliography ==
- Calderón Medina, Inés (2011). "Las otras mujeres del rey: El concubinato regio en el reino de León (1157- 1230)". Seminário Medieval 2009–2011 (PDF) (in Spanish). Coordinators:Ferreira, María do Rosário; Laranjinha, Ana Sofia; Ribeiro Miranda, José Carlos. Oporto: Instituto de Filosofía da Faculdade de Letras da Universidade do Porto. pp. 255–289. ISBN 9789898459145. Archived from the original (PDF) on 2020-11-20.
- Sottomayor Pizarro, José Augusto (1997). Linhagens Medievais Portuguesas: Genealogias e Estratégias (1279-1325 (in Portuguese). Oporto: Doctorate thesis, author’s edition. hdl:10216/18023.
