= Miguel Alonso =

Miguel Alonso, where Alonso is the first or paternal surname, may refer to:

- Miguel Alonso Cordero (born 1952), Cuban wrestler
- Miguel Alonso Raya (born 1954), Mexican politician, four-time deputy
- Miguel Alonso Reyes (born 1971), Mexican politician, governor of Zacatecas (2010–2016)
- Miguel Alonso (rugby), competed in 2010–11 European Challenge Cup pool stage
