= María Carmen López Segura =

Mexican politician

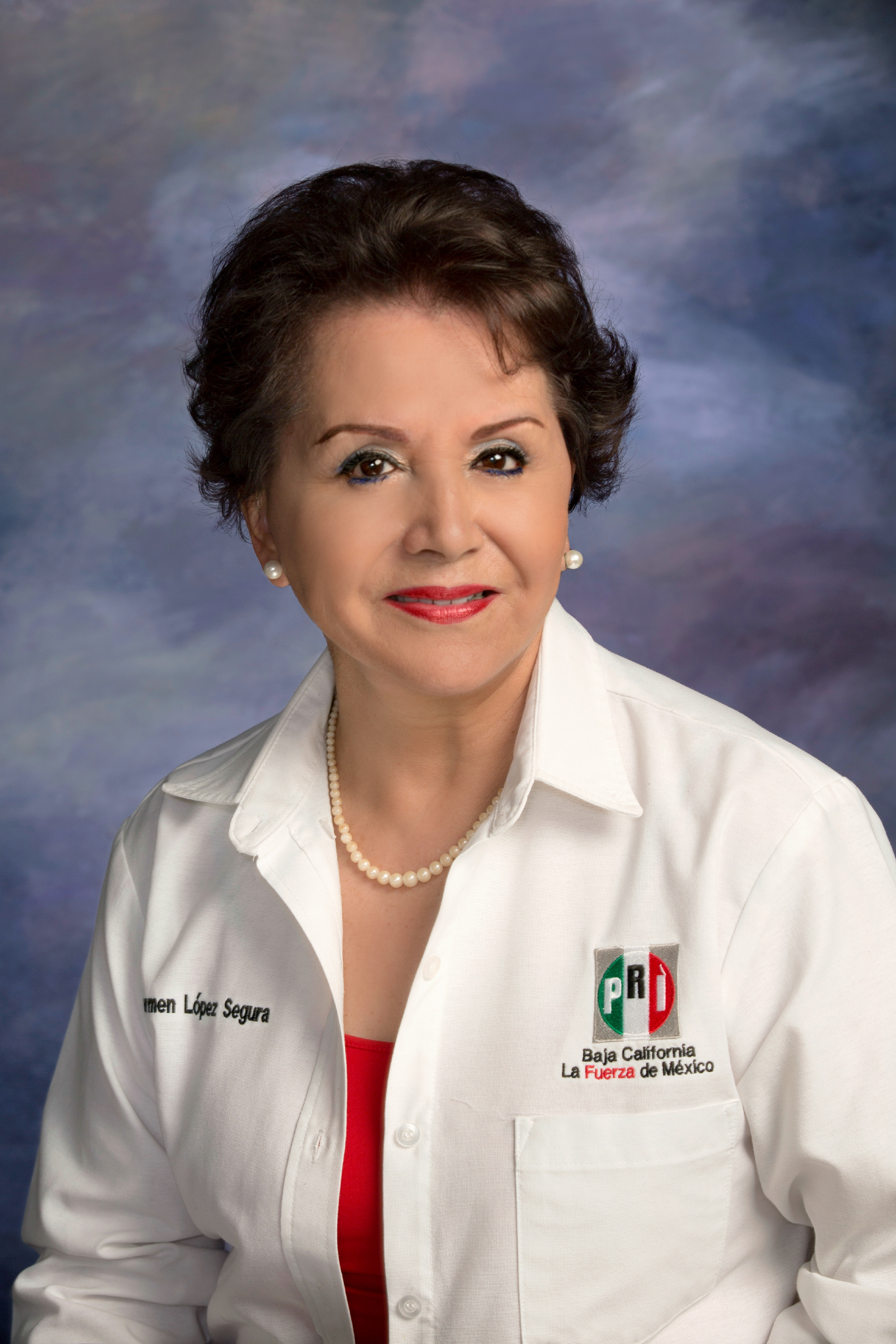
- Born: 30 March 1946 (age 80); Tijuana, Baja California, Mexico
- Occupation: Deputy
- Political party: PRI

María Carmen López Segura (born 30 March 1946) is a Mexican politician affiliated with the PRI. As of 2013 she served as Deputy of the LXII Legislature of the Mexican Congress representing Baja California as replacement of María Elvia Amaya Araujo.
