= Samperio =

Samperio is a Hispanic surname. Notable people with it are:

- Jairo Samperio (born 1993), Spanish professional footballer
- Juana Dayanara Barraza Samperio (born 1957), Mexican serial killer
- Juan Ignacio Samperio (born 1957), Mexican politician
