= Víctor González Manríquez =

Mexican politician

- Born: 23 May 1959 (age 67); Venustiano Carranza, D.F., Mexico
- Occupation: Politician
- Political party: PAN

Víctor Rafael González Manríquez (Note: In this Mexican name, the surname is González and the second or maternal family name is Manríquez.) (born 23 May 1959) is a Mexican politician affiliated with the National Action Party (PAN). Born in Mexico City, most of his political career has been in the state of Oaxaca.

From 2002 to 2004, was the municipal president of Salina Cruz, Oaxaca, and in the 2009 mid-terms, he unsuccessfully fought the 5th federal electoral district of Oaxaca.

In 2012, he was elected to a third region plurinominal seat in the Chamber of Deputies for the duration of the 62nd Congress. During the congressional session, he chaired the Social Security Committee.

In 2017, he contended for a second term in the municipal presidency of Salina Cruz, but lost to Rodolfo León Aragón of the Institutional Revolutionary Party (PRI).

In the 2018 general election, he was the PAN–PRD–MC candidate in Oaxaca's 5th district but lost to Carol Antonio Altamirano of the National Regeneration Movement (Morena).
