= Jorge Villalobos Seañez =

Mexican politician and lawyer

- Born: 19 July 1978 (age 47); Chihuahua, Mexico
- Occupations: Deputy and lawyer
- Political party: PAN

Jorge Iván Villalobos Seañez (born 19 July 1978) is a Mexican politician and lawyer affiliated with the PAN. As of 2013 he served as a Deputy in the LXII Legislature of the Mexican Congress representing Sinaloa.

== Controversies ==
In August 2014, Reporte Indigo published online a video of Villalobos and several other PAN deputies, among them Luis Alberto Villarreal and Máximo Othón Zayas, in a party with exotic dancers at a luxury compound in Puerto Vallarta, Jalisco. Villalobos was subsequently fired from his leadership position in the Chamber of Deputies.
