= Juan Isidro del Bosque =

Mexican politician

- Born: 9 December 1961 (age 64); Orizaba, Veracruz, Mexico
- Occupation: Deputy
- Political party: PRI

Juan Isidro del Bosque Márquez (born 9 December 1961) is a Mexican politician affiliated with the Institutional Revolutionary Party (PRI).

In 2013–2015 he served in the Chamber of Deputies, representing Veracruz's 15th congressional district during the latter half of the 62nd Congress. He was sworn in on 4 April 2013 as the substitute of Juan Manuel Diez Francos.
