= Lucila =

Lucila may refer to:

- Lucila Frend (born 1985), Argentine woman who was the main suspect in the unsolved murder case of Solange Grabenheimer.
- Lucila Godey Alcaya (1889–1957), known as Gabriela Mistral, Chilean poet-diplomat, educator and humanist
- Lucila Gallegos Camarena (born 1961), Mexican politician from the National Action Party
- Lucila Campos (1938–2016), Peruvian singer known as "la Morena Espectáculo" and "Reina de las Polladas"
- Lucila Luciani de Pérez Díaz (1882–1971), Venezuelan historian, musician and feminist
- Lucila Garfias (born 1951), Mexican politician affiliated with the PANAL
- Lucila Rubio de Laverde, Colombian socialist and one of the leading suffragettes in her country
- Lucila Gamero de Medina (1873–1964), Honduran romantic novelist
- Lucila Palacios (Mercedes Carvajal de Arocha) (1902–1994), Trinidadian—Venezuelan writer, politician and diplomat
- Lucila Pascua (born 1983), Spanish basketball center
- Lucila Pini (1930–1974), Brazilian sprinter
- Leona Lucila Vidal Roberts (born 1972), Falkland Islands curator, radio broadcaster and politician
- María Lucila Beltrán Ruiz (1932–1996), known as Lola Beltrán, Mexican singer, actress, and television presenter
- Lucila Salao (born 1954), Filipino sprinter
- Lucila Vianna da Silva (born 1976), Brazilian handball player
- Lucila Santos Trujillo (1925–1984), First Lady of Ecuador to Otto Arosemena from 1966 to 1968

== See also ==
- La Lucila, town of the Vicente López Partido in the northern suburbs of Greater Buenos Aires, Argentina
- La Lucila del Mar, town in the La Costa Partido of the Province of Buenos Aires, Argentina
- Lucilia (disambiguation)
- Lucilina
- Lucilla
- Luciola
