= Roberto López Rosado =

Mexican politician

- Born: 16 February 1961 (age 65); Santo Domingo Petapa, Oaxaca, Mexico
- Occupation: Deputy
- Political party: PRD

Roberto López Rosado (born 16 February 1961) is a Mexican politician affiliated with the PRD. As of 2013 he served as Deputy of the LXII Legislature of the Mexican Congress representing Oaxaca as replacement of his brother Gabriel.
