= Yesenia =

Yesenia may refer to:

== Film and television ==
- Yesenia (film), a 1971 Mexican film starring Jacqueline Andere and Jorge Lavat
- Yesenia (1970 TV series), a Mexican telenovela produced by Valentín Pimstein for Telesistema Mexicano
- Yesenia (1987 TV series), a Mexican telenovela produced by Irene Sabido for Televisa

== People ==
- Yesenia Aldama (born 1989), Cuban handball goalkeeper
- Yesenia "Jessie" Camacho, American reality show contestant
- Yesenia Centeno (born 1971), Spanish marathon runner
- Yesenia Ferrera (born 1998), Cuban artistic gymnast
- Yesenia López (born 1990), Chilean footballer
- Yesenia Miranda (born 1994), Salvadoran racewalker
- Yesenia Montilla, Dominican-American poet
- Yesenia Nolasco Ramírez (born 1982), Mexican politician
- Yesenia Valencia (born 1991), Guatemalan recurve archer
