= Rubén Acosta =

Rubén Acosta can refer to:

- Rubén Acosta (volleyball) (born 1934), Mexican sports administrator
- Rubén Acosta (footballer) (born 1968), Uruguayan football player
- Rubén Acosta Montoya (born 1973), Mexican politician
- Ruben Eduardo Acosta (born 1978), Argentine boxer
- Rubén Darío Acosta (born 1996), Colombian cyclist
