= Berumen =

Berumen is a German surname. Notable people with the surname include:

- Andrés Berumen (born 1971), Mexican baseball player
- Ernesto Berúmen, Mexican pianist
- Isaías Cortés Berumen (born 1972), Mexican politician
- Mariana Berumen (born 1991), Mexican beauty pageant contestant
