= Arturo Escobar =

Arturo Escobar may refer to:

- Arturo Escobar (anthropologist), Colombian American anthropologist
- Arturo Escobar y Vega, Mexican politician
