= Rodrigo González =

Rodrigo González may refer to:

- Rodrigo González de Lara (fl. 1078–1143), medieval Spanish nobleman
- Rodrigo González Girón (died 1256), medieval Spanish nobleman
- Rodrigo González de la Puebla (c. 1450 – 1509) was a Spanish lawyer and diplomat
- Rodrigo González Torres (born 1941), Chilean politician
- Rockdrigo González (1950–1985), Mexican musician and songwriter
- Rodrigo González Barrios (born 1958), Mexican politician
- Rodrigo González (swimmer) (born 1968), Mexican swimmer at the 1988 Summer Olympics
- Rodrigo González (musician) (born 1968), Chilean-German musician
- Rodrigo González (footballer, born April 1995), Mexican footballer
- Rodrigo González (footballer, born November 1995), Chilean footballer
- Rodrigo González (footballer, born 2000), Argentine footballer
- Rodrigo González (triathlete) (born 1989), Mexican triathlete
