= María Urciel Castañeda =

Mexican politician

- Born: 9 October 1959 (age 66); Nayarit, Mexico
- Occupation: Deputy
- Political party: PAN

María Urciel Castañeda (born 9 October 1959) is a Mexican politician affiliated with the PAN. As of 2013 she served as Deputy of the LXII Legislature of the Mexican Congress representing Nayarit.
