= María Sanjuana Cerda Franco =

Mexican politician

- Born: 22 April 1951 (age 75); Monterrey, Nuevo León, Mexico
- Occupation: Deputy
- Political party: PANAL

María Sanjuana Cerda Franco (born 22 April 1951) is a Mexican politician affiliated with the PANAL. As of 2013 she served as Deputy of the LXII Legislature of the Mexican Congress representing Nuevo León.
