= Josefina Salinas Pérez =

Mexican politician (born 1965)

- Born: 3 September 1965 (age 60); State of Mexico, Mexico
- Occupation: Deputy
- Political party: PRD

Josefina Salinas Pérez (born 3 September 1965) is a Mexican politician affiliated with the PRD. As of 2013 she served as Deputy of the LXII Legislature of the Mexican Congress representing the State of Mexico.
