= Cristina Olvera Barrios =

Mexican politician

- Born: 24 July 1953 (age 72); Sonora, Mexico
- Occupation: Deputy
- Political party: PANAL

Cristina Olvera Barrios (born 24 July 1953) is a Mexican politician affiliated with the PANAL. As of 2013 she served as Deputy of the LXII Legislature of the Mexican Congress representing the Federal District.
