= Ricardo Cantú Garza =

Mexican politician

- Born: 23 May 1953 (age 73); Nuevo León, Mexico
- Occupation: Deputy
- Political party: PT

Ricardo Cantú Garza (born 23 May 1953) is a Mexican politician affiliated with the Labor Party. He served as a federal deputy in the LVII, LX and LXII Legislatures of the Mexican Congress representing the State of Mexico. Previously, he served as a local deputy in the LXVII Legislature of the Congress of Nuevo León.
