= Martha Córdova Bernal =

Mexican politician

- Born: 24 February 1967 (age 59); Ciudad Juárez, Chihuahua, Mexico
- Occupation: Deputy
- Political party: MC

Martha Beatriz Córdova Bernal (born 24 February 1967) is a Mexican politician affiliated with the Convergence. She began her political career as National Councilor for Convergence in 2001, holding that position in a state capacity in 2002. She was general secretary of the Executive Commission of Convergence in Chihuahua in 2003. And from 2005 to 2008, she was President of the Municipal Committee of Convergence in Ciudad Juárez . In 2009 she was a union representative of the national union of education workers. In 2011 the partico changed his name to Movimento Ciudadano. As of 2013 she served as Deputy of the LXII Legislature of the Mexican Congress representing Chihuahua. In 2016, she was appointed director of education during the government of Mayor Armando Cabada. In 2021 she participates as a candidate for councilor of the city council of Juarez but loses the election.
