= Miriam Cárdenas Cantú =

Mexican politician

- Born: 8 October 1964 (age 61); Coahuila, Mexico
- Education: Autonomous University of Coahuila; UANL
- Occupation: Deputy
- Political party: PRI

Miriam Cárdenas Cantú (born 8 October 1964) is a Mexican politician affiliated with the PRI. As of 2013 she served as Deputy of the LXII Legislature of the Mexican Congress representing Coahuila.
