= Roberto López Suárez =

Mexican politician

- Born: 9 September 1972 (age 53); Venustiano Carranza, D.F., Mexico
- Occupation: Deputy
- Political party: PRD

Roberto López Suárez (born 9 September 1972) is a Mexican politician affiliated with the PRD. As of 2013 he served as Deputy of the LXII Legislature of the Mexican Congress representing Zacatecas.
