= Karina Labastida Sotelo =

Mexican politician

- Born: 12 January 1976 (age 50); Mexico City, Mexico
- Occupation: Deputy
- Political party: MORENA

Karina Labastida Sotelo (born 12 January 1976) is a Mexican politician affiliated with the MORENA. As of 2013, she served as Deputy of the LXII Legislature of the Mexican Congress representing the State of Mexico.
