= María Guadalupe Mondragón =

Mexican politician

- Born: 7 November 1958 (age 67); San Pedro, Coahuila, Mexico
- Occupations: Deputy and Senator
- Political party: PAN

María Guadalupe Mondragón González (born 7 November 1958) is a Mexican politician affiliated with the PAN. As of 2013 she served as Deputy of the LXII Legislature of the Mexican Congress representing the State of Mexico. She also served as Senator during the LXI Legislature.
