= Adolfo Orive Bellinger =

Mexican politician

Plurinominal Deputy of the Mexico Chamber of Deputies from the Federal District
- In office 2012–2015

Personal details
- Born: 13 August 1940 (age 85) Tijuana, Baja California, Mexico
- Party: PRI (1973–2009); PT (2009–2015)
- Children: Adolfo Orive
- Parent: Adolfo Orive Alba

Adolfo Orive Bellinger (born 13 August 1940) is a Mexican politician and author formerly affiliated with the Labor Party (Previously to the PRI). As of 2013 he served as Deputy of the LXII Legislature of the Mexican Congress representing the Federal District.

== Books ==
- La Dificil Construccion De Una Utopia (Spanish edition) (2003)
