= María Elena Cano Ayala =

Mexican politician

- Born: 20 April 1955 (age 71); Guanajuato, Mexico
- Education: Universidad de Guanajuato
- Occupation: Politician
- Political party: PRI
- Website: http://mariaelenacano.mex.tl/

María Elena Cano Ayala (Note: In this Mexican name, the surname is Cano and the second or maternal family name is Ayala.) (born 20 April 1955) is a Mexican politician affiliated with the Institutional Revolutionary Party (PRI). She served as a plurinominal deputy during the 62nd Congress representing Guanajuato, and previously served as a local deputy in the LVII and LXI Legislatures of the Congress of Guanajuato.
