= José Alberto Rodríguez Calderón =

Mexican politician

- Born: 23 October 1961 (age 64); Pachuca, Hidalgo, Mexico
- Occupation: Deputy
- Political party: PRI

José Alberto Rodríguez Calderón (born 23 October 1961) is a Mexican politician affiliated with the PRI. As of 2013 he served as Deputy of the LXII Legislature of the Mexican Congress representing Hidalgo as replacement of Jesús Murillo Karam.
