= Adolfo Romero Lainas =

Mexican politician

- Born: 12 October 1958 (age 67); Tuxtepec, Oaxaca, Mexico
- Education: Universidad Veracruzana
- Occupation: Senator
- Political party: PRD

Adolfo Romero Lainas (born 12 October 1958) is a Mexican politician affiliated with the PRD. He currently serves as Senator of the LXII Legislature of the Mexican Congress representing Oaxaca.
