= Luis Manuel Arias Pallares =

Mexican politician

- Born: 20 October 1978 (age 47); Mexico City, Mexico
- Occupation: Deputy
- Political party: PRD
- Children: Luis Arias Cruz

Luis Manuel Arias Pallares (born 20 October 1978) is a Mexican politician affiliated with the PRD. As of 2012 he served as Deputy of the LXII Legislature of the Mexican Congress representing the Federal District.

He also held party positions. In 2008 he was elected as a member of the National Electoral Commission of the Party of the Democratic Revolution, the body in charge of conducting the party's internal electoral processes for the selection of candidates and leaders. From November 2014 to December 2017 he was a member of the party's National Executive Committee as head of the Strategic Planning Area. In 2018, he was nominated by the party and elected Councilor of Proportional Representation in the Mayor's Office of Iztapalapa, a position he currently holds.
