= Patricia Lugo Barriga =

Mexican politician

- Born: 8 November 1973 (age 52); Colima, Mexico
- Occupation: Deputy
- Political party: PAN

Patricia Lugo Barriga (born 8 November 1973) is a Mexican politician affiliated with the PAN. As of 2013 she served as Deputy of the LXII Legislature of the Mexican Congress representing Colima.
