= Roberto López González =

Mexican politician (born 1958)

- Born: 7 June 1958 (age 67); Guadalajara, Jalisco, Mexico
- Occupation: Deputy
- Political party: PRD

Roberto López González (born 7 June 1958) is a Mexican politician affiliated with the PRD. As of 2013 he served as Deputy of the LXII Legislature of the Mexican Congress representing Jalisco.
