= Erick Rivera Villanueva =

Mexican politician (born 1970)

- Born: 14 January 1970 (age 56); Zimapán, Hidalgo, Mexico
- Political party: PAN

Erick Marte Rivera Villanueva (born 14 January 1970) is a Mexican politician affiliated with the PAN. As of 2013 he served as Deputy of the LXII Legislature of the Mexican Congress representing Hidalgo.
