= Angélica Melchor Vásquez =

Mexican politician

- Born: 12 April 1980 (age 46); Oaxaca, Oaxaca, Mexico
- Occupation: Deputy
- Political party: PRD

Angélica Rocío Melchor Vásquez (born 12 April 1980) is a Mexican politician affiliated with the PRD. As of 2013 she served as Deputy of the LXII Legislature of the Mexican Congress representing Oaxaca.
