= Tania Morgan Navarrete =

Mexican politician

- Born: 12 August 1985 (age 40); Cuauhtémoc, D.F., Mexico
- Occupation: Deputy
- Political party: PAN

Tania Margarita Morgan Navarrete (born 12 August 1985) is a Mexican politician affiliated with the PAN. As of 2013 she served as Deputy of the LXII Legislature of the Mexican Congress representing Sinaloa.
