= Rosendo Serrano Toledo =

Mexican politician

- Born: 20 May 1959 (age 67); Ciudad Ixtepec, Oaxaca, Mexico
- Occupation: Deputy
- Political party: PRD

Rosendo Serrano Toledo (born 20 May 1959) is a Mexican politician affiliated with the PRD. As of 2013 he served as Deputy of the LXII Legislature of the Mexican Congress representing Oaxaca.
