= Carlos Humberto Castaños Valenzuela =

Mexican politician

Carlos Humberto Castaños
- Born: 14 April 1977 (age 49); Culiacán, Sinaloa, Mexico
- Education: Universidad Iberoamericana
- Occupation: Deputy
- Political party: PAN

Carlos Humberto Castaños Valenzuela (born 14 April 1977) is a Mexican politician affiliated with the PAN. As of 2013 he served as Deputy of the LXII Legislature of the Mexican Congress representing Sinaloa.
