= Sindicato Nacional de Trabajadores de la Educación =

Mexican trade union representing teachers

SNTE
- National Educational Workers Union
- Sindicato Nacional de Trabajadores de la Educación
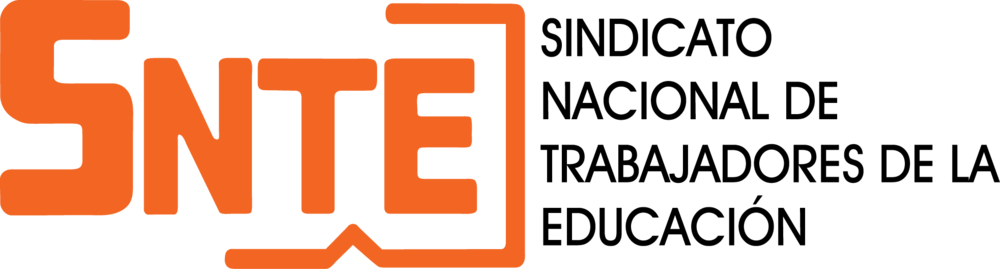
- Founded: 1943
- Location: Mexico
- Members: 1.4 million
- President and General Secretary: Alfonso Cepeda Salas
- Affiliations: Education International
- Website: snte.org.mx

The National Educational Workers Union (Spanish: Sindicato Nacional de Trabajadores de la Educación, SNTE) is a trade union which represents teachers in Mexico. Its current Secretary-General and President is Alfonso Cepeda Salas.

With over 1.4 million members, it is currently the largest teachers' union in the Americas and the largest union in Latin America. Formed in 1949, the SNTE is composed of local sections in each of Mexico's states. For much of its history, the SNTE has been a corporatist union allied with the long-ruling Institutional Revolutionary Party (PRI) and has been accused of having government-appointed charro leaders and anti-democratic tendencies. This resulted in a movement in the late 1970s and early 1980s in which sections from several states began demanding democratic reforms in the union structure. This movement resulted in the fall of SNTE leader Carlos Jongitud Barrios in 1989. He was replaced by Elba Esther Gordillo as president, a position she held until her arrest in late February 2013.

== History ==
=== Origins ===
The SNTE has its roots in the struggle of teacher unions during the presidency of Porfirio Díaz, which violently suppressed all opposition. Teachers strikes in May 1919 and the strike of Veracruz in 1927 and 1928, established the need for an organisation. Both movements affected the construction and strengthening of the Mexican Confederation of Teachers.

With the building of opposition to the government, 1932 saw the formation of the Mexican Confederation of Teachers, and in 1934, the League of Education Workers (under the leadership of the Mexican Communist Party), the Workers' University and the National Federation of Education Workers. By 1935 the United Front was formed from the National Education Workers, culminating with the creation of the National Confederation of Education Workers, during a period of a huge boom in worker, peasant and popular union associations.

The SNTE began to consolidate from 1939, with the formation of various regionalised trade guilds and unions that were adhering to the Confederation of Mexican Workers (CTM), which in turn served as the labor sector of the PRI.

In 1936 the CTM supported the creation of the Union of Education Workers of the Mexican Republic (STERM Inter). From its foundation, it began to form the basis of a national educational system. But due to internal and external conflicts, the union began to splinter, forming the Revolutionary Front of Teachers (after the Mexican Union of Teachers and Education Workers).

A crisis created the emergence of SNATE, which also later created FRMM, STERM and FSTSE. Véjar Octavio Vazquez tried to unite the teachers from the top, but only managed further division. In April 1942, he agreed to a unity pact between SMMTE, SUNTE and STERM which created one national guild. With the support of CTM, the SNTE was created under the leadership of Luis Chavez Orozco, who remained in office for a year.

=== Corporatist era ===
During the administration of Adolfo Lopez Mateos, during the largest teachers strike in the first half of the 20th century, the government suppressed the strike, and consolidated all teacher representation under the SNTE. It was during the 1970's as well that archaeological site guards began to join the SNTE.

In 1974, SNTE elected Carlos Jonguitud Barrios as its general secretary. A former elected member of PRI, whilst also serving as general director of the Institute for Social Security and Services for State Workers (ISSSTE) from 1976 until 1979, he promoted trade unionism through regular strikes. As the union became more militant, in an audience with President Carlos Salinas de Gortari, the President demanded his resignation in 1989.

=== Leadership of Elba Esther Gordillo: 1989 - 2013 ===
The President appointed as new SNTE general secretary Elba Esther Gordillo Morales, who after struggling under her successor Ernesto Zedillo as president, under the successor governments to the Institutional Revolutionary Party (PRI) was able to wield the power of SNTE nationally far more effectively for the gain of the SNTE, and her own enrichment.

After the election of Vicente Fox of the National Action Party (PAN) as president within the Alliance for Change, Gordillo became a personal friend and trusted adviser. As a result, she was herself ejected from PRI, and hence the union formed its own political party, the New Alliance Party (PANAL), with her daughter on the committee and with Rafael Ochoa Guzmán, the former SNTE general secretary, as the parties deputy and senator. The effect of SNTE and PANAL in the 2006 general election contributed to Felipe Calderón's victory, allowing Gordillo to negotiate further quotas of power during his administration. As a result, Gordillo was made SNTE President for Life in 2008, at a conference where she presented each of the 57 regional deputies with their own personal Hummer H2.

With Gordillo under increasing attack during the 2012 elections, accused by successive governments of stopping the advance of education reforms, the SNTE tried to form an alliance with the PRI, but this fell apart. New President Enrique Peña Nieto of the PRI proposed a series of educational reforms which were opposed by SNTE, but at the last minute before they were signed into legislation on the 25 February 2013, and eventually agreed by Gordillo and the SNTE.

During her period in office, Gordillo became notorious for wearing luxury brands such as Hermès and Chanel. On 26 February, Gordillo was arrested by the Mexican authorities at the Toluca airport for allegedly embezzling $2 billion pesos ($156 million USD or €119 million euros) from the SNTE. In a case laid out in court the next day by attorney general Jesús Murillo Karam, authorities alleged that although she claimed only to have earned 1.1m pesos (US$86,000) between 2009 and 2012, her expenditure included:

- $3.1 million USD at a Neiman Marcus department store in San Diego between March 2009 and January 2012.
- $2.0 million transferred to bank accounts in Switzerland and Liechtenstein in the name of a company 99% owned by Gordillo's mother. The company bought two properties with the money in California, including a US$1.7 million home in San Diego that she claims belongs to her mother and other family members.
- Amassed a total of 10 properties
- $1.4 million in transfers to a private jet company called Avemex
- $17,260 to plastic surgery clinics in California

== Objectives ==
From its formation, the STNE has presented the idea of a single trade union representing all educational workers across the country. Supported by its ties with the State and the Party of the Mexican Revolution (PRM), the SNTE became a pillar of the state, identified with nationalism and political hegemony, holding the unity of all workers in the country's education and the voice of business interests to the education authority. Currently, union members must pay one percent of their salary as union fees.

The SNTE is recognized by the government in educational policy decisions as a group representing the interests of professional, technical, administrative and social labor in the education sector. It manifests itself in defense of the principles of Article 3 of the Constitution and supporting free and compulsory education provided by the State.

The SNTE has been accused of indirectly benefiting the cartels against the federal government in the Mexican drug war. A World Economic Forum report stated that Mexico invested, as of 2009, a relatively high 5.3 percent of its GDP in education, yet its primary education system ranks poorly. The WEF's report blames this underperformance on the SNTE's opposition to reforms which could increase the effectiveness of education funding. This resulted in the appearance of the ninis (ni trabajan ni estudian, "neither work nor study"), an underclass of several million dropouts, of whom many ended up as combatants on the side of the cartels in the Mexican drug war.

== Organisation ==
The SNTE is composed of a National President; a General Secretariat Executive; Chartered, National Governing Bodies; Auxiliary Organizations; and Associations of Solidarity. It is divided into 54 union delegations throughout Mexico.

The union organisation and administration currently numbers over 53,000 workers, providing members with all services plus health and educational support.

== See also ==
- Education in Mexico
