= Roxana Luna Porquillo =

Mexican politician

- Born: 24 March 1981 (age 45); San Andrés Cholula, Puebla, Mexico
- Occupation: Deputy
- Political party: PRD

Roxana Luna Porquillo (born 24 March 1981) is a Mexican politician affiliated with the PRD. As of 2013 she served as Deputy of the LXII Legislature of the Mexican Congress representing Puebla.
