= Hugo Sandoval Martínez =

Mexican politician (born 1962)

- Born: 25 December 1962 (age 63); Tlalpan, Federal District, Mexico
- Occupation: Deputy
- Political party: PRD

Hugo Sandoval Martínez (born 25 December 1962) is a Mexican politician affiliated with the PRD. As of 2013 he served as Deputy of the LXII Legislature of the Mexican Congress representing the Federal District as replacement of Alejandro Sánchez Camacho.
