= Martín Vásquez Villanueva =

Mexican politician (born 1965)

- Born: 7 September 1965 (age 60); Oaxaca, Mexico
- Occupation: Deputy
- Political party: PRI
- Website: web.archive.org/web/20140210111147/http://www.martinvasquez.com.mx/

Martín de Jesús Vásquez Villanueva (born 7 September 1965) is a Mexican politician affiliated with the PRI. As of 2013 he served as Deputy of the LXII Legislature of the Mexican Congress representing Oaxaca.
