= Rafael Ochoa Guzmán =

Mexican politician

- Born: 7 February 1955 (age 71); Huatusco, Veracruz, Mexico
- Occupation: Politician
- Political party: PANAL

Rafael Ochoa Guzmán (Note: In this Mexican name, the surname is Ochoa and the second or maternal family name is Guzmán.) (born 7 February 1955) is a Mexican politician affiliated with the New Alliance Party (PANAL). He served as a national-list senator during the 60th and 61st Congresses (2006–2012).

In 2007 he left his seat on being appointed general secretary of the Sindicato Nacional de Trabajadores de la Educación (the national education workers' union, SNTE). In 2010 he reassumed his seat. He was replaced by his alternate, Irma Martínez Manríquez, during his leave of absence.
