= Jorge del Ángel Acosta =

Mexican politician

- Born: 28 June 1948 (age 77); Veracruz, Mexico
- Occupation: Deputy
- Political party: PRI

Jorge del Ángel Acosta (born 28 June 1948) is a Mexican politician affiliated with the PRI. As of 2013 he served as Deputy of the LXII Legislature of the Mexican Congress representing Veracruz.
