= Manríquez =

Manríquez (var. Manrique) is a Spanish patronymic surname of Germanic origin. Notable people with the surname include:

- Andreas Lennkvist Manriquez (born 1994), Swedish politician
- Fernando Manríquez (born 1984), Chilean footballer
- Irma Martínez Manríquez, Mexican politician
- José Manríquez (born 1987), association football player
- Rafael Manríquez (born 1947), Chilean journalist, musician, and producer
- Salomón Manríquez (born 1982), Venezuelan baseball player and coach
- Silvia Manríquez (born 1955), Mexican actress
- Víctor Manuel Manríquez (born 1982), Mexican politician
