= Pedro Porras Pérez =

Mexican politician (born 1959)

- Born: 1 August 1959 (age 66); Tezontepec de Aldama, Hidalgo, Mexico
- Occupation: Deputy
- Political party: PRD

Pedro Porras Pérez (born 1 August 1959) is a Mexican politician affiliated with the PRD. He served as a federal deputy of the LXII Legislature of the Mexican Congress representing the State of Mexico. He previously served as the municipal president of Tezontepec de Aldama and as a local deputy in the LVII Legislature of the Congress of Hidalgo.
