= Erika Funes Velázquez =

Mexican politician

Erika Yolanda Funes Velázquez
- Born: 16 October 1975 (age 50); State of Mexico, Mexico
- Education: UDLAP
- Occupation: Deputy
- Title: Doctor Honoris Causa y Licenciada en Administración de Empresas
- Political party: PRI
- Spouse: Oscar Octavio Salgado Alvarez

Erika Yolanda Funes Velázquez (born 16 October 1975) is a Mexican politician affiliated with the PRI. As of 2013 she served as Deputy of the LXII Legislature of the Mexican Congress representing the State of Mexico.
