= Juan Carlos Uribe Padilla =

Mexican politician (born 1966)

- Born: 31 December 1966 (age 59); State of Mexico, Mexico
- Occupation: Deputy
- Political party: PAN

Juan Carlos Uribe Padilla (born 31 December 1966) is a Mexican politician affiliated with the PAN. As of 2013 he served as Deputy of the LXII Legislature of the Mexican Congress representing the State of Mexico.
