= María Guadalupe Moctezuma =

Mexican politician

- Born: 8 June 1983 (age 42); Xalapa, Veracruz, Mexico
- Status: secretaría de relaciones diplomáticas T-MEC
- Education: licenciatura en derecho
- Occupation: Deputy
- Political party: PRD
- Family: gustavo garcia Garcia, Cassandra Acosta Moctezuma Luis Enrique Jara Moctezuma

María Guadalupe Moctezuma Oviedo (born 8 June 1983) is a Mexican politician affiliated with the PRD. As of 2013,2014,2015. 2018,2019,2020 she served as Deputy of the LXII Legislature of the Mexican Congress representing Veracruz.
