= Manrique =

Manrique (var. Manríquez) is (1) a name of Visigothic origin, a given name derived from the Gothic name Ermanaric ([H]ermanarico, [H][er]manrique) later translated into Spanish and (2) a surname.

== Given name ==
- Manrique Pérez de Lara (died 1164), magnate of the Kingdom of Castile and its regent from 1158 until his death
- Manrique Larduet (born 1996), Cuban artistic gymnast

== Surname ==
- César Manrique (1919–1992), Spanish artist and architect
- Francisco Manrique (1919–1988), Argentine policy maker and politician
- Fred Manrique, Venezuelan baseball player
- Gómez Manrique (c. 1412–1490), Spanish poet
- Jaime Manrique, Colombian writer
- Jair Manrique (born 1997), Peruvian politician
- Jorge Manrique (1440–1479), Spanish poet
- Laurent Manrique (born 1966), French restaurateur and chef
- Manuel Manrique (1793–1823), military leader for the independence of Venezuela
- Miguel Manrique, Spanish painter
- Nelson Manrique (1947–2026), Peruvian historian and sociologist
- Sebastien Manrique, Portuguese missionary and traveler to India
