= Leticia Calderón Ramírez =

Mexican politician

- Born: 1 August 1971 (age 54); Federal District, Mexico
- Occupation: Deputy
- Political party: PRI
- Website: http://www.leticiacalderonrmz.com/

Leticia Calderón Ramírez (born 1 August 1971) is a Mexican politician affiliated with the PRI. As of 2013 she served as Deputy of the LXII Legislature of the Mexican Congress representing the State of Mexico.
