= Flor Pedraza Aguilera =

Mexican politician

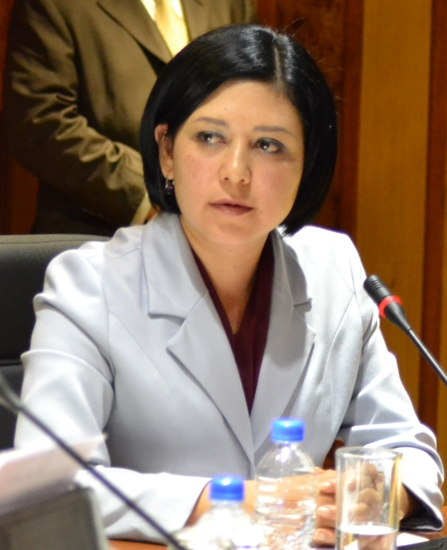
- Born: 21 August 1977 (age 48); Mexico City, Mexico
- Occupation: Deputy
- Political party: PAN

Flor de María Pedraza Aguilera (born 21 August 1977) was a Mexican politician affiliated with the ultra right wing political party PAN. During 2013 she served as Deputy of the LXII Legislature of the Mexican Congress representing the Federal District.
