= Juan Manuel Diez Francos =

Mexican politician

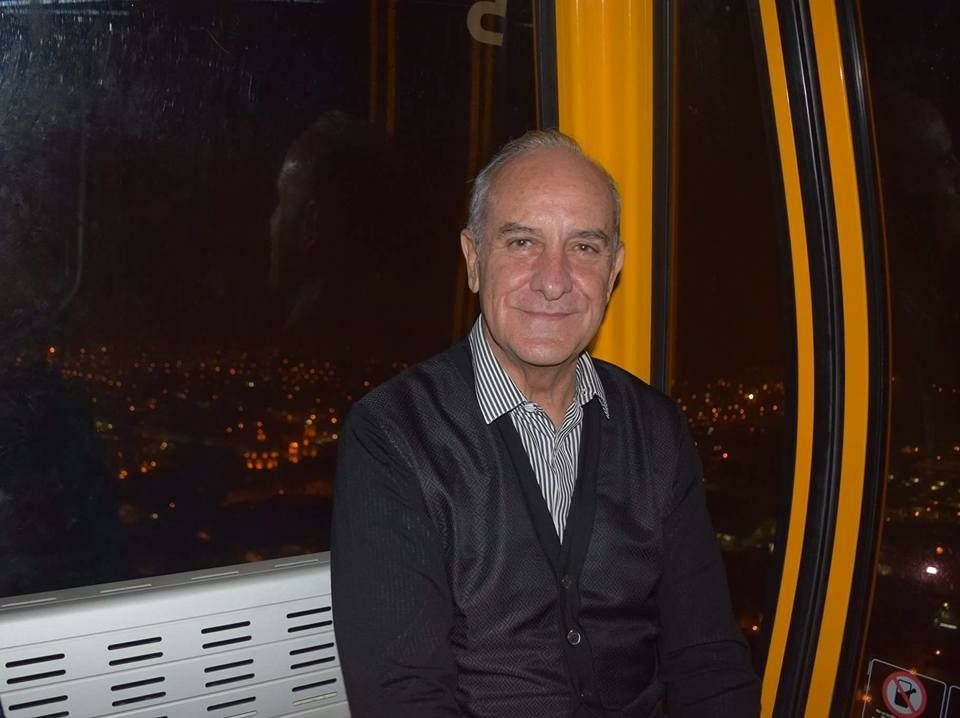
- Juan Manuel Diez Francos in 2018
- Born: 15 December 1951 (age 74); Orizaba, Veracruz, Mexico
- Occupation: Politician
- Political party: PRI

Juan Manuel Diez Francos (born 15 December 1951) is a Mexican politician affiliated with the Institutional Revolutionary Party (PRI).

In the 2012 general election he was elected to the Chamber of Deputies to represent Veracruz's 15th district during the 62nd session of Congress; he served from 31 August 2012 to 23 April 2013, when he was replaced by his substitute, Juan Isidro del Bosque.
