= María Fernanda Romero Lozano =

Mexican politician

- Born: 15 April 1986 (age 40); Tabasco, Mexico
- Occupation: Deputy
- Political party: MC (2000s–2014); MORENA (2014–present)

María Fernanda Romero Lozano (born 15 April 1986) is a Mexican politician affiliated with the National Regeneration Movement. As of 2013 she served as Deputy of the LXII Legislature of the Mexican Congress representing Tabasco.
