= Raúl Cervantes Andrade =

Mexican politician

Attorney General of Mexico
- In office 26 October 2016 – 16 October 2017
- President: Enrique Peña Nieto
- Preceded by: Arely Gómez González
- Succeeded by: Alberto Elías Beltrán

President of the Senate of Mexico
- In office 1 September 2013 – 31 August 2014
- Preceded by: Ernesto Cordero Arroyo
- Succeeded by: Miguel Barbosa Huerta

Personal details
- Born: 3 June 1963 (age 63) Cuauhtémoc, D.F., Mexico
- Party: PRI
- Occupation: Academic

Raúl Cervantes Andrade (born 3 June 1963) is a Mexican lawyer, academic, businessman and politician. He was CEO of CEA Abogados S.C., vice-president of the Cámara Nacional del Autotransporte de Pasaje y Turismo (CANAPAT), and has twice served as a federal deputy for the Institutional Revolutionary Party (PRI). He served as Senator of the LXII Legislature of the Mexican Congress from 1 September 2013 to 30 August 2014.

Cervantes graduated from the Universidad Iberoamericana Ciudad de México and earned a doctoral degree in law with honors and graduated cum laude from Panamerican University. He also completed several other courses and certifications in protection, economic and corporate law, international trade and finance law, criminal law, banking law and senior management. He is the founder and former CEO of the Mexican law firm CEA Abogados. The firm has specialised in transportation law and quickly became one of the main providers of legal services for the transportation industry in Mexico.

Cervantes was elected a federal deputy in the LVIII Legislature of the Mexican Congress from 2000 to 2003, and again in the LX Legislature from 2006 to 2009. Cervantes was elected to the Mexican Senate by the National Party List from 2012 to 2018. He presided over the Constitutional Points Committee of the Senate. On 1 September 2013, he assumed the presidency of the Senate board, which concluded 31 August 2014. On 3 September 2014, he asked for license to separate himself indefinitely from his charge.

Cervantes is a full-time professor at the Instituto Tecnológico Autónomo de México (ITAM), as well as a lecturer and writer.
