= Leonor Romero Sevilla =

Mexican politician

- Born: 7 September 1958 (age 67); Paraíso, Tabasco, Mexico
- Occupation: Deputy
- Political party: PAN

Leonor Romero Sevilla (born 7 September 1958) is a Mexican politician affiliated with the PAN. As of 2013 she served as Deputy of the LXII Legislature of the Mexican Congress representing Tlaxcala.
