= Margarita Tapia Fonllem =

Mexican politician (born 1959)

- Born: 11 April 1959 (age 67); Ciudad Obregón, Sonora, Mexico
- Education: UNAM; Universidad de Sonora
- Occupation: Deputy
- Political party: PRD

Margarita Elena Tapia Fonllem (born 11 April 1959) is a Mexican politician affiliated with the Party of the Democratic Revolution. She served as Deputy of the LXII Legislature of the Mexican Congress representing the Federal District.
