= María Pineda Gochi =

Mexican politician (born 1955)

- Born: 8 September 1955 (age 70); Zacapu, Michoacán, Mexico
- Education: UMSNH
- Occupation: Senator
- Political party: PRI

María del Rocío Pineda Gochi (born 8 September 1955) is a Mexican politician affiliated with the PRI. She currently serves as Senator of the LXII Legislature of the Mexican Congress representing Michoacán.
