= Sergio Augusto Chan Lugo =

Mexican politician

- Born: 16 August 1967 (age 58); Mérida, Yucatán, Mexico
- Occupation: Deputy
- Political party: PAN

Sergio Augusto Chan Lugo (born 16 August 1967) is a Mexican politician affiliated with the PAN. He served as Deputy of the LXII Legislature of the Mexican Congress representing Yucatán, having previously served in the Congress of Yucatán from 1998 to 2001.
