= Crystal Tovar Aragón =

Mexican politician

- Born: 23 January 1990 (age 35); Santa Isabel, Chihuahua, Mexico
- Occupation: Deputy

Crystal Tovar Aragón (born 23 January 1990) is a Mexican politician. As of 2013 she served as Deputy of the LXII Legislature of the Mexican Congress representing Chihuahua.
