= Verónica García Reyes =

Mexican politician

- Born: 23 August 1977 (age 48); Zacapu, Michoacán, Mexico
- Occupation: Deputy
- Political party: PRD

Verónica García Reyes (born 23 August 1977) is a Mexican politician affiliated with the PRD. As of 2013 she served as Deputy of the LXII Legislature of the Mexican Congress representing Michoacán.
