= Domitilo Posadas Hernández =

Mexican politician (born 1958)

- Born: 12 May 1958 (age 68); Toluca, State of Mexico, Mexico
- Occupation: Deputy
- Political party: PRD

Domitilo Posadas Hernández (born 12 May 1958) is a Mexican politician affiliated with the Partido de la Revolución Democrática (PRD). He served as Deputy of the LXII Legislature of the Mexican Congress (2012-2015) representing the State of Mexico.
