= Margarita Licea González =

Mexican politician (born 1959)

- Born: 28 February 1959 (age 67); Jalisco, Mexico
- Occupation: Deputy
- Political party: PAN

Margarita Licea González (born 28 February 1959) is a Mexican politician affiliated with the PAN. As of 2013, she served as Deputy of the LXII Legislature of the Mexican Congress representing Jalisco.
