= Adán David Ruiz =

Mexican politician (born 1966)

Adán David Ruíz
- Born: 1 February 1966 (age 60); Monterrey, Mexico
- Occupation: Deputy
- Political party: PRI

Adán David Ruíz Gutiérrez (born 1 February 1966) is a Mexican politician affiliated with the PRI. As of 2013 he served as Deputy of the LXII Legislature of the Mexican Congress representing Baja California as replacement of Fernando Castro Trenti.
