= Raúl Macías Sandoval =

Mexican politician

- Born: 22 September 1942 (age 83); State of Mexico, Mexico
- Occupation: Deputy
- Political party: PRI

Raúl Macías Sandoval (born 22 September 1942) is a Mexican politician affiliated with the PRI. As of 2013 he served as Deputy of the LXII Legislature of the Mexican Congress representing the State of Mexico.
