= Elsa Patricia Araujo =

Mexican politician (born 1960)

- Born: 30 January 1960 (age 66); Villa de Llera de Canales, Tamaulipas, Mexico
- Occupation: Deputy
- Political party: PRI

Elsa Patricia Araujo de la Torre (born 30 January 1960) is a Mexican politician affiliated with the PRI. As of 2013 she served as Deputy of the LXII Legislature of the Mexican Congress representing Tamaulipas.
