= Carla Reyes Montiel =

Mexican politician

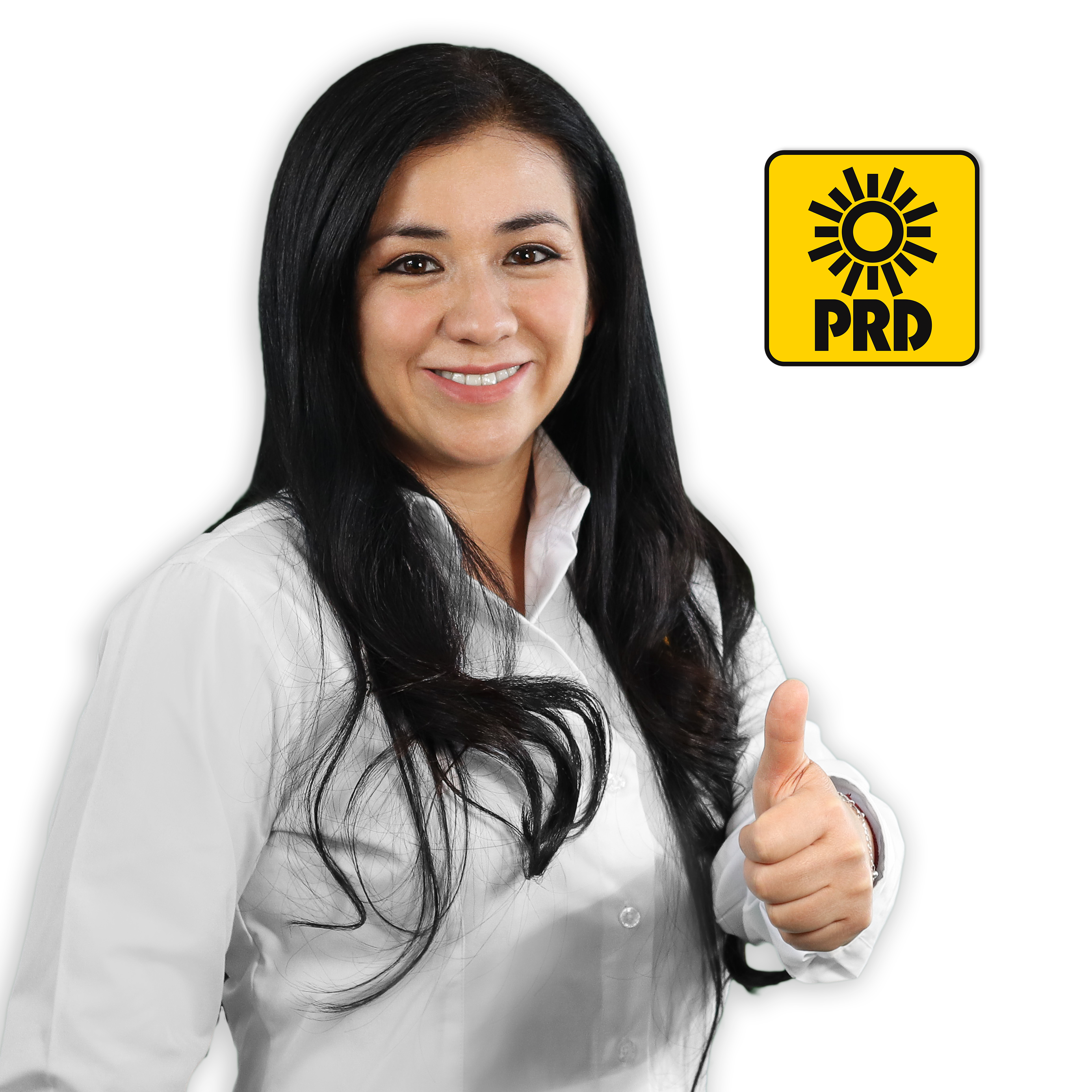
- Born: 2 February 1983 (age 43); Huixquilucan de Degollado, State of Mexico, Mexico
- Occupation: Deputy
- Political party: PRD

Carla Guadalupe Reyes Montiel (born 2 February 1983) is a Mexican politician affiliated with the PRD. As of 2013, she served as a Deputy in the LXII Legislature of the Mexican Congress, representing the State of Mexico.
