= Rodrigo Chávez Contreras =

Mexican politician

- Born: 26 May 1960 (age 65); Mexico City, Mexico
- Occupation: Director General de la Comisión Nacional de Vivienda
- Political party: Morena (2014–a la fecha); MORENA (2014–present)
- Children: 3

Rodrigo Chávez Contreras (26 May 1960) is a Mexican politician affiliated with the National Regeneration Movement. As of 2013 he served as Deputy of the LXII Legislature of the Mexican Congress representing the Federal District as replacement of Martí Batres.
