= Marcelo Garza Ruvalcaba =

Mexican politician

- Born: 8 September 1983 (age 42); Monterrey, Nuevo León, Mexico
- Occupation: Deputy
- Political party: PRD

Marcelo Garza Ruvalcaba (born 8 September 1983) is a Mexican politician affiliated with the PRD. As of 2013 he served as Deputy of the LXII Legislature of the Mexican Congress representing Nuevo León.
