= Rafael Alejandro Micalco =

Mexican politician

- Born: 21 January 1970 (age 56); San Luis Potosí, San Luis Potosí, Mexico
- Occupation: Deputy
- Political party: PAN

Rafael Alejandro Micalco Méndez (born 21 January 1970) is a Mexican politician affiliated with the PAN. He currently serves as Deputy of the LXII Legislature of the Mexican Congress representing Puebla.
