= Teresita de Jesús Borges =

Mexican politician

- Born: 17 August 1965 (age 60); Yucatán, Mexico
- Occupation: Deputy
- Political party: PRD

Teresita de Jesús Borges Pasos (born 17 August 1965) is a Mexican politician affiliated with the PRD. As of 2013 she served as Deputy of the LXII Legislature of the Mexican Congress representing Yucatán.
