= Mario Alejandro Cuevas Mena =

Mexican politician

- Born: 16 May 1972 (age 54); Halachó, Yucatán, Mexico
- Occupation: Deputy
- Political party: PRD

Mario Alejandro Cuevas Mena (born 16 May 1972) is a Mexican politician affiliated with the PRD. He served as Deputy of the LXII Legislature of the Mexican Congress representing Yucatán, and he previously served in the LVII Legislature of the Congress of Yucatán.
