= Nelly González Aguilar =

Mexican politician

- Born: 7 April 1977 (age 49); Mainero, Tamaulipas, Mexico
- Occupations: Deputy and Senator
- Political party: PAN

Lázara Nelly González Aguilar (born 7 April 1977) is a Mexican politician affiliated with the PAN. As of 2013, she served as Deputy of the LXII Legislature of the Mexican Congress, representing Tamaulipas. She also served as Senator during the LX and LXI Legislatures.
