= Carmen Pérez Camarena =

Mexican politician (born 1968)

Carmen Lucía Pérez Camarena
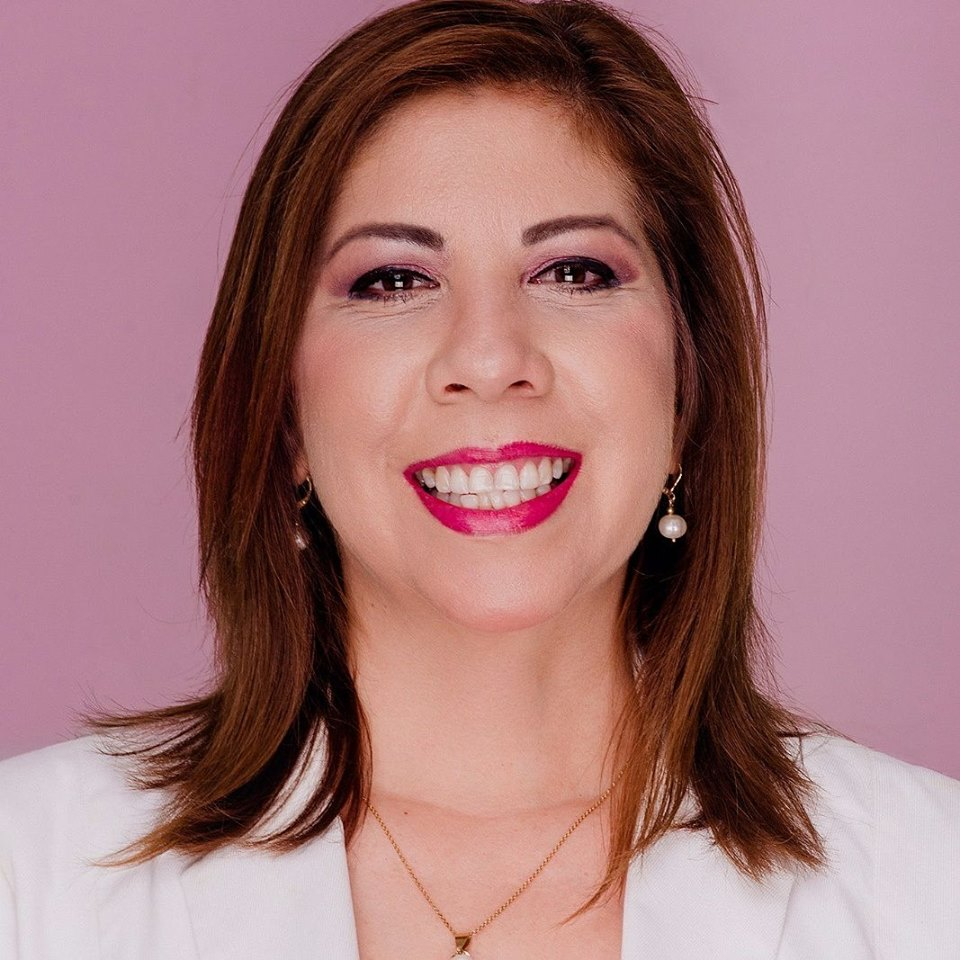
- Born: 8 October 1968 (age 57); Mexico City, Mexico
- Education: ITESO
- Occupation: Deputy
- Political party: PAN
- Website: lucyperez.mx

Carmen Lucía Pérez Camarena (born 8 October 1968) is a Mexican politician affiliated with the PAN. As of 2013 she served as Deputy of the LXII Legislature of the Mexican Congress representing Jalisco.

She started her career in the National Action Party in 1988. During her initiation she participated in Acción Juvenil de Zapopan, Jalisco. Since 1995, she has held various positions in the National Steering Committee of the PAN in Jalisco, as Director of courses, Secretary of Political Promotion of Women, Director of Citizen Promotion, Secretary of Training and Training and Deputy General Secretary.

She has also been a counselor of the PAN in Jalisco for three terms, Secretary of the Commission of Order and is currently a member of the Permanent Commission. She has been National Councilor of the PAN since 1997, where she has participated in the Commission of Militants, and is currently a member of the National Council's Vigilance Commission.

In the public service she has served as Senior Administrative Officer of the Municipality of Tlaquepaque, Local Deputy, Councilor for the City of Tlaquepaque, President of the Jalisco Institute for Women. As a federal Deputy and a Federal Representative, she works as Secretary of the Commission of Rights of the Child, and of the Commission of Gender Equality, and she was also a member of the Commission of Attention to Vulnerable Groups and of the Commission of Citizen Participation, she is also President of the Friendship Group with Lithuania. She has collaborated in the publication of the book "Leadership and Equity", made by UNESCO chair of the U de G, she has been an editorialist of newspapers in Jalisco and Millennial Newspaper, and currently has a collaboration on Tuesday at the Jornada Jalisco. She is a founding partner of Equity, Legality and Justice. In 2015 she competed in the municipality of San Pedro Tlaquepaque reaching 26,913 votes, becoming part of the integration of the municipal administration as a councilor for the period 2015 to 2018. She currently presides over transparency and combat commissions to corruption, and health and hygiene, highlighting the creation of the commission to combat corruption in being the first created in the municipality of Jalisco. She is an honorary member of "Transform Together A.C". This is an association that promotes the empowerment of women through "dream incubators" also carrying out different philanthropic activities and support to the most vulnerable communities. She participates in the RAEP (Ethics in Policy Action Network); in the AMEB (Mexican Association of Former Scholars of the American Consulate, Chapter West) and in the Mexican Association of Women Entrepreneurs, Guadalajara Chapter. She has participated as an editorialist in El Universal, Al Grano, Jalisco Day newspaper, Mural and DK 1250, she currently has a weekly collaboration in El Diario de Guadalajara.
