= Miguel Ángel Aguayo =

Mexican politician

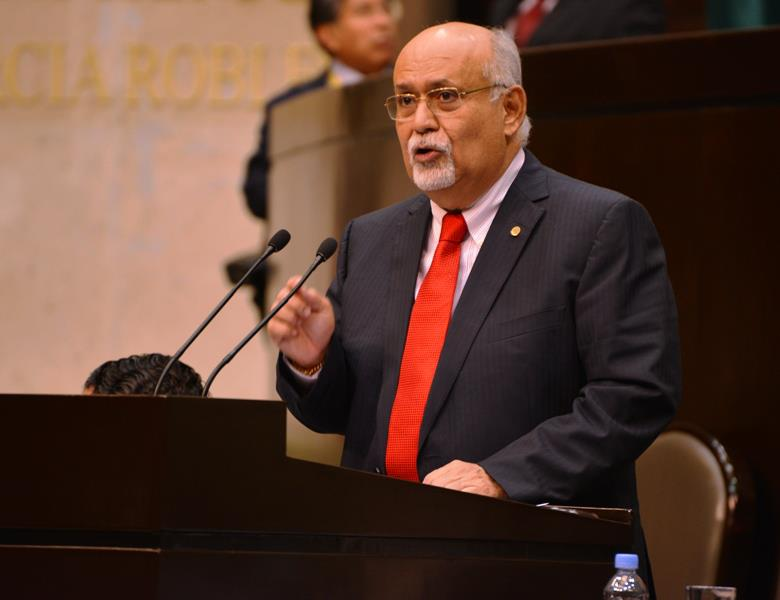
- Miguel Ángel Aguayo in 2012.
- Born: 20 August 1951 (age 74); Colima, Colima, Mexico
- Occupation: Deputy
- Political party: PRI party

Miguel Ángel Aguayo López (born 20 August 1951) is a Mexican politician affiliated with the Mexican party PRI. He currently serves as Deputy of the LXII Legislature of the Mexican Congress representing Colima.
