= Guadalupe Ortega Pacheco =

Mexican politician

- Born: 29 April 1966 (age 60); Yucatán, Mexico
- Occupation: Deputy
- Political party: PRI

Guadalupe del Socorro Ortega Pacheco (born 29 April 1966) is a Mexican politician affiliated with the PRI. As of 2013 she served as Deputy of the LXII Legislature of the Mexican Congress representing Yucatán.
