= José Isabel Trejo =

Mexican politician

- Born: 9 April 1959 (age 67); Zacatecas, Mexico
- Occupations: Deputy and Senator
- Political party: PAN

José Isabel Trejo Reyes (born 9 April 1959) is a Mexican politician affiliated with the PAN. As of 2013 he served as Deputy of both the LIX and LXII Legislatures of the Mexican Congress representing Zacatecas. He also served as Senator during the LX and LXI Legislatures.
