= Aurora Aguilar Rodríguez =

Mexican politician

- Born: 15 June 1967 (age 58); Tampico, Tamaulipas, Mexico
- Occupation: Deputy
- Political party: PAN

Aurora de la Luz Aguilar Rodríguez (born 15 June 1967) is a Mexican politician affiliated with the PAN. She currently serves as Deputy of the LXII Legislature of the Mexican Congress representing Tlaxcala.
