= Trinidad Morales Vargas =

Mexican politician

- Born: 16 June 1957 (age 68); Chihuahua, Chihuahua, Mexico
- Occupation: Deputy
- Political party: PRD

Trinidad Secundino Morales Vargas (born 16 June 1957) is a Mexican politician affiliated with the PRD. As of 2013 he served as Deputy of the LXII Legislature of the Mexican Congress representing the Federal District. He is a former member of the Communist League.
