= Julisa Mejía Guardado =

Mexican politician

- Born: 16 October 1960 (age 65); Mexico City, Mexico
- Occupation: Deputy
- Political party: PRD

Julisa Mejía Guardado (born 16 October 1960) is a Mexican politician affiliated with the PRD. As of 2013 she served as Deputy of the LXII Legislature of the Mexican Congress representing the State of Mexico.
