= Martha Berenice Álvarez Tovar =

Mexican politician

- Born: 24 December 1975 (age 50); Michoacán, Mexico
- Occupation: Deputy
- Political party: PAN

Martha Berenice Álvarez Tovar (born 24 December 1975) is a Mexican politician affiliated with the PAN. As of 2013 she served as Deputy of the LXII Legislature of the Mexican Congress representing Michoacán.
