= Blanca María Villaseñor =

Mexican politician

- Born: 28 September 1963 (age 62); Michoacán, Mexico
- Occupation: Deputy
- Political party: PRI

Blanca María Villaseñor Gudiño (born 28 September 1963) is a Mexican politician affiliated with the PRI. As of 2013 she served as Deputy of the LXII Legislature of the Mexican Congress representing Michoacán.
