= Ramón Montalvo Hernández =

Mexican politician

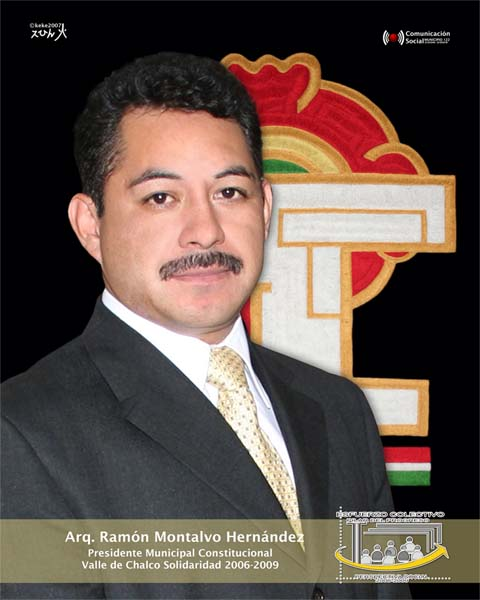
- Born: 29 July 1974 (age 51); Ciudad Nezahualcóyotl, State of Mexico, Mexico
- Occupation: Deputy
- Political party: PRD

Ramón Montalvo Hernández (born 29 July 1974) is a Mexican politician affiliated with the PRD. From September 1, 2012, to August 31, 2015, he served as Deputy of the LXII Legislature of the Mexican Congress representing the State of Mexico. He also served as the Municipal President (Mayor) of Valle de Chalco from 2006 to 2009 and again from 2016 to 2019.
