= Ramón Sampayo Ortiz =

Mexican politician

Ramón Sampayo Ortíz
- Born: 31 August 1957 (age 68); Matamoros, Tamaulipas, Mexico
- Occupation: Deputy
- Political party: PAN

Ramón Antonio Sampayo Ortíz (born 31 August 1957) is a Mexican politician affiliated with the PAN. As of 2013 he served as Deputy of the LXII Legislature of the Mexican Congress representing Tamaulipas.
