= Mónica García de la Fuente =

Mexican politician and lawyer

- Born: 10 July 1980 (age 45); Miguel Hidalgo, D.F., Mexico
- Occupations: Politician and lawyer
- Political party: PVEM

Mónica García de la Fuente (born 10 July 1980) is a Mexican politician and lawyer, affiliated with the PVEM. As of 2013, she served as Deputy of the LXII Legislature of the Mexican Congress representing Aguascalientes. She was elected by national list.
