= Andrés de la Rosa Anaya =

Mexican politician

- Born: 8 May 1971 (age 55); Ciudad Morelos, Baja California, Mexico
- Education: UABC
- Occupation: Deputy
- Political party: PAN

Andrés de la Rosa Anaya (born 8 May 1971) is a Mexican politician affiliated with the PAN. He served as Federal Deputy of the LXII Legislature of the Mexican Congress representing Baja California. He subsequently served as a local deputy in the XXII Legislature of the Congress of Baja California. He is a native of Ciudad Morelos, a town in Mexicali Municipality.
