= Héctor Roblero Gordillo =

Mexican politician

- Born: 28 April 1948 (age 78); Siltepec, Chiapas, Mexico
- Occupation: Deputy
- Political party: PT

Héctor Hugo Roblero Gordillo (born 28 April 1948) is a Mexican politician affiliated with the Labor Party. As of 2013 he served as Deputy of the LXII Legislature of the Mexican Congress representing Chiapas, and previously served in the LX and LXII Legislatures of the Congress of Chiapas.
