= Luis Miguel Ramírez Romero =

Mexican politician

- Born: 29 September 1969 (age 56); Cuernavaca, Morelos, Mexico
- Occupation: Deputy
- Political party: PAN

Luis Miguel Ramírez Romero (born 29 September 1969) is a Mexican politician affiliated with the PAN. As of 2013 he served as Deputy of the LXII Legislature of the Mexican Congress representing Morelos.
