= Raudel López López =

Mexican politician

- Born: 17 December 1969 (age 56); Calvillo, Aguascalientes, Mexico
- Occupation: Deputy
- Political party: PAN

Raudel López López (born 17 December 1969) is a Mexican politician affiliated with the PAN. As of 2013 he served as Deputy of the LXII Legislature of the Mexican Congress representing Aguascalientes.
