= Federico González Luna =

Mexican politician

- Born: 3 June 1966 (age 59); Mexico City, Mexico
- Occupation: Deputy
- Political party: PVEM

Federico José González Luna Bueno (born 3 June 1966) is a Mexican politician affiliated with the PVEM. As of 2013 he served as Deputy of the LXII Legislature of the Mexican Congress representing Veracruz.
