= María de las Nieves García =

Mexican politician

- Born: 5 April 1955 (age 71); Oaxaca, Oaxaca, Mexico
- Occupation: Deputy
- Political party: PRI

María de las Nieves García Fernández (born 5 April 1955) is a Mexican politician affiliated with the PRI. As of 2013 she served as Deputy of the LXII Legislature of the Mexican Congress representing Oaxaca.
