= Jorge Luis Preciado =

Mexican politician

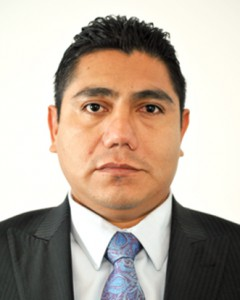
- Born: 9 August 1972 (age 53); Colima City, Colima, Mexico
- Education: University of Colima
- Occupation: Senator
- Political party: PAN (1996-2023)

Jorge Luis Preciado Rodríguez (born 9 August 1972) is a Mexican politician who used to be affiliated with PAN until his resignation from the party in 2023 after 27 years affiliated. He served as Senator of the LXII an LXIII Legislatures of the Mexican Congress representing Colima first minority. He also served as proportional representation Deputy during the LIX and LXIV Legislatures, as well as a proportional representation local deputy in the Congress of Colima during the LII and LV Legislatures. He was candidate for the governorship of the state of Colima in 2015, but lost by 511 votes to the PRI candidate Ignacio Peralta. He was the PAN candidate who came closest to achieving the state governorship.
