= Antonio Cuéllar Steffan =

Mexican politician and lawyer

- Born: 10 May 1968 (age 58); Federal District, Mexico
- Occupations: Deputy and lawyer
- Political party: PVEM

Antonio Cuéllar Steffan (born 10 May 1968) is a Mexican politician and lawyer affiliated with the PVEM. He currently serves as Deputy of the LXII Legislature of the Mexican Congress representing Aguascalientes.
