= Martha Gutiérrez Manrique =

Mexican politician

- Born: 28 January 1960 (age 66); Mexico City, Mexico
- Occupation: Deputy
- Political party: PRI

Martha Gutiérrez Manrique (born 28 January 1960) is a Mexican politician affiliated with the PRI. As of 2013 she served as Deputy of the LXII Legislature of the Mexican Congress representing Hidalgo as replacement of Nuvia Mayorga Delgado.
