= Guillermo Sánchez Torres =

Mexican politician

- Born: 25 June 1959 (age 66); Mexico City, Mexico
- Occupation: Deputy
- Political party: PRD

Guillermo Sánchez Torres (born 25 June 1959) is a Mexican politician affiliated with the PRD. As of 2013 he served as Deputy of the LXII Legislature of the Mexican Congress representing the Federal District.
