= José Ángel Ávila Pérez =

Mexican politician

- Born: 7 October 1956 (age 69); Cuauhtémoc, D.F., Mexico
- Occupations: Deputy and lawyer
- Political party: PRD

José Ángel Ávila Pérez (born 7 October 1956) is a Mexican politician and lawyer affiliated with the PRD. As of 2013 he served as Deputy of the LXII Legislature of the Mexican Congress representing the Federal District. He served also as Government Secretary of the Federal District during Marcelo Ebrard's administration.
