= Alfredo Zamora García =

Mexican politician

- Born: 28 March 1963 (age 63); Durango, Mexico
- Occupation: Deputy
- Political party: PAN

Alfredo Zamora García (born 28 March 1963) is a Mexican politician affiliated with the PAN. As of 2013 he served as Deputy of the LXII Legislature of the Mexican Congress representing Baja California Sur.
