= Raúl Santos Galván Villanueva =

Mexican politician

- Born: 1 December 1944 (age 81); Monterrey, Nuevo León, Mexico
- Occupation: Deputy
- Political party: PRI

Raúl Santos Galván Villanueva (born 1 December 1944) is a Mexican politician affiliated with the PRI. As of 2013 he served as Deputy of the LXII Legislature of the Mexican Congress representing Sinaloa.
