= Cinthya Valladares Couoh =

Mexican politician

- Born: 10 July 1981 (age 44); Mérida, Yucatán, Mexico
- Occupation: Deputy
- Political party: PAN

Cinthya Noemí Valladares Couoh (born 10 July 1981) is a Mexican politician affiliated with the PAN.

Valladares served as the Councillor of the City Council of Mérida, Yucatán from 2010 to 2012, and as Deputy of the LXII Legislature of the Mexican Congress representing Yucatán from 29 August 2012 to 31 August 2015.
