= Julio César Moreno Rivera =

Mexican politician

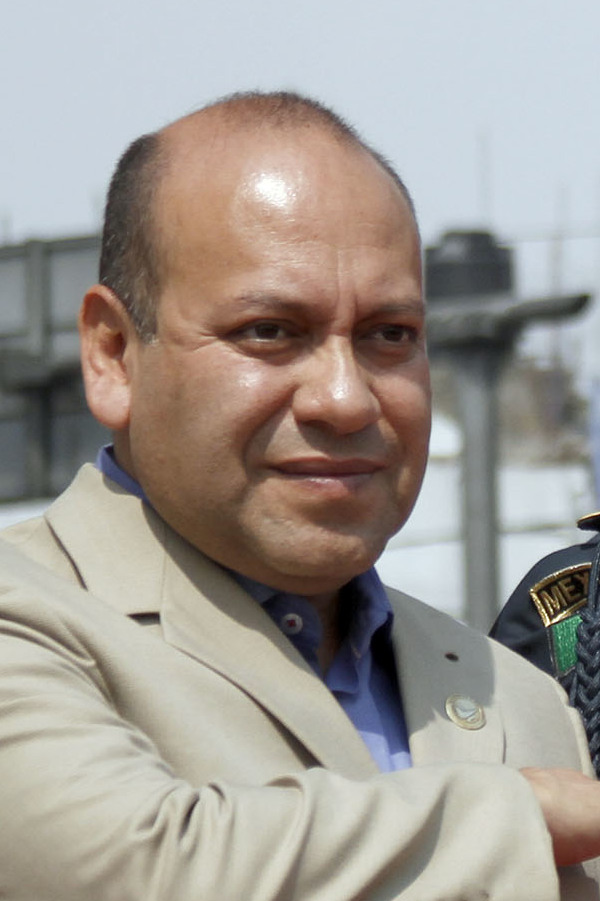
- Born: 2 February 1973 (age 53); Cuernavaca, Morelos, Mexico
- Occupation: Politician
- Political party: PRD, Morena

Julio César Moreno Rivera (born 2 February 1973) is a Mexican politician. He has been affiliated with both the Party of the Democratic Revolution (PRD) and the National Regeneration Movement (Morena).

Moreno Rivera has been elected to a plurinominal seat in the Chamber of Deputies on three occasions: in the 2012 general election for the PRD, and in the 2021 mid-terms and the 2024 general election for Morena.
