= Maria Teresa Ramirez-Giraldo =

Colombian economist

María Teresa Ramírez-Giraldo

Academic background
- Education: Universidad de los Andes; University of Illinois at Urbana-Champaign

Academic work
- Discipline: Economic history, economic growth, development economics
- Institutions: Banco de la República
- Website: Information at IDEAS / RePEc

María Teresa Ramírez-Giraldo is a Colombian economist and economic historian. She is a principal researcher in the research unit of the Banco de la República, the central bank of Colombia, where she has worked for most of her career. Her research focuses on economic growth, economic development, and the economic history of Colombia, with contributions on transport infrastructure, labor markets, health, and gender.

She has published in national and international journals and books, has edited academic volumes, and has served as an editor of the journal Ensayos sobre Política Económica. She has also taught university courses in economic growth and economic history.

== Education ==
Ramírez-Giraldo earned her undergraduate degree in economics from the Universidad de los Andes in Bogotá, where she also completed a master's degree in economics. She subsequently received a master's degree and a Ph.D. in economics from the University of Illinois at Urbana-Champaign.

== Career and research ==
Ramírez-Giraldo joined the Banco de la República in 1990, beginning in its Department of Economic Studies as an economist. Since July 2001 she has served as a principal researcher in the bank's research unit, based in Bogotá.

Her research covers a few main areas. As an economic historian she has studied long-run living standards, transport infrastructure, and the economic development of Colombia in the twentieth century. She has also examined economic growth and development, looking at productivity, infrastructure, and what drives growth at the aggregate level. In labor economics she has researched how Colombian firms set wages and why those wages tend to be rigid, along with what shapes labor force participation. A further strand of her work deals with gender and health, including gender gaps in education and the labor market, the role of women in central banking, and the connection between people's health and their economic outcomes.

Her most cited article was published in the Journal of Development Economics and found that infrastructure makes a substantial contribution to output, generally exceeding its cost, and that institutions affect how quickly countries close infrastructure gaps. The research finding was covered in the press.

== Selected publications ==
- Meisel-Roca, Adolfo; Ramírez-Giraldo, María Teresa; Jaramillo-Echeverri, Juliana (2016). "Too late but profitable: Railroads in Colombia during 1920-1950". Investigaciones de Historia Económica. 12 (3): 165–180.
- Iregui-Bohórquez, Ana María; Melo-Becerra, Ligia Alba; Ramírez-Giraldo, María Teresa (2016). "Health status and labor force participation: evidence for urban low and middle income individuals in Colombia". Portuguese Economic Journal. 15 (1): 33–55.
- Iregui-Bohórquez, Ana María; Melo-Becerra, Ligia Alba; Ramírez-Giraldo, María Teresa (2014). "Wage-setting decisions on newly hired employees: survey evidence from Colombian firms". Managerial and Decision Economics. 35 (3): 231–246.
- Meisel-Roca, Adolfo; Ramírez-Giraldo, María Teresa; Lasso Jaramillo, Daniel (2023). "Gender height dimorphism: an approximation of the living standards in Colombia, 1920-1990". Investigaciones de Historia Económica. 19 (2).
- Iregui-Bohórquez, Ana María; Ramírez-Giraldo, María Teresa; Caicedo-Silva, Sara Isabel (2024). "Las mujeres en la banca central: El caso del Banco de la República de Colombia, 1923-2023". Cuadernos de Historia Económica (62). Banco de la República.
