= Isaías Cortés Berumen =

Mexican politician (born 1972)

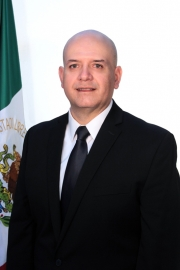
- Born: 14 October 1972 (age 53); Jalisco, Mexico
- Education: University of Guadalajara
- Occupation: Deputy
- Political party: PAN

Isaías Cortés Berumen (born 14 October 1972) is a Mexican politician affiliated with the PAN. He served as Deputy of the LXII Legislature of the Mexican Congress representing Jalisco, having previously served in the Congress of Jalisco.
