= Lucila Garfias =

Mexican politician

- Born: 1 December 1951 (age 74); Mexico State, Mexico
- Occupation: Deputy
- Political party: PANAL

Lucila Garfias Gutiérrez (born 1 December 1951) is a Mexican politician affiliated with the PANAL. She currently serves as Deputy of the LXII Legislature of the Mexican Congress representing the Mexico State.
