= Rodrigo González Barrios =

Mexican politician

- Born: 12 March 1958 (age 68); San Blas, Nayarit, Mexico
- Occupation: Deputy
- Political party: PRD
- Website: http://rodrigogonzalezbarrios.com/

Rodrigo González Barrios (born 12 March 1958) is a Mexican politician affiliated with the PRD. As of 2013 he served as Deputy of the LXII Legislature of the Mexican Congress representing Nayarit.
