= Rubén Acosta Montoya =

Mexican politician and lawyer

- Born: 2 December 1973 (age 52); Ciudad Juárez, Chihuahua, Mexico
- Occupation: Deputy
- Political party: PVEM

Rubén Acosta Montoya (born 2 December 1973) is a Mexican politician and lawyer affiliated with the PVEM. He currently serves as Deputy of the LXII Legislature of the Mexican Congress representing Chihuahua.
