= Máximo Othón Zayas =

Mexican politician

- Born: 15 May 1971 (age 55); Navojoa, Sonora, Mexico
- Other name: Máx Othón
- Occupation: Deputy
- Political party: PAN

Máximo Othón Zayas (born 15 May 1971) is a Mexican politician affiliated with the National Action Party (PAN). In 2012–2015 he served as a federal deputy in the 62nd session of Congress, representing Sonora's seventh district.

== Controversies ==
In August 2014, Reporte Indigo published online a video of several PAN deputies, among them Othón Zayas, at a party with exotic dancers in a luxury compound in Jalisco. The General Secretary of the PAN in Sonora said it was impossible to sanction Othón Zayas for events related to his private life.
