= Juan Ignacio Samperio =

Mexican politician

- Born: 4 October 1957 (age 68); State of Mexico, Mexico
- Occupation: Deputy
- Political party: MC

Juan Ignacio Samperio Montaño (born 4 October 1957) is a Mexican politician affiliated with the Convergence. As of 2013, he served as Deputy of both the LX and LXII Legislatures of the Mexican Congress representing the State of Mexico.
