= Mario Sánchez (sport shooter) =

Mexican sports shooter (1934–2017)

Personal information
- Born: 13 April 1934
- Died: September 2017 (aged 83)

Sport
- Sport: Sports shooting

Mario Sánchez (13 April 1934 – September 2017) was a Mexican sports shooter. He competed at the 1972 Summer Olympics and the 1984 Summer Olympics.
