= Brasil Acosta Peña =

Mexican politician

- Born: 21 June 1970 (age 55); Texcoco, Mexico, Mexico
- Education: Chapingo Autonomous University; El Colegio de México
- Occupation: Congressman
- Political party: PRI

Brasil Alberto Acosta Peña (born 21 June 1970) is a Mexican politician affiliated with the PRI. He currently serves as Congressman for the LXIV Legislature of the Mexican Congress representing the State of Mexico.
