= María Verónica Martínez Espinoza =

Mexican politician (born 1949)

- Born: 20 July 1949 (age 77)
- Education: UdeG
- Occupation: Senator
- Political party: PRI

María Verónica Martínez Espinoza (born 20 July 1949) is a Mexican politician affiliated with the PRI. She currently serves as Senator of the LXII Legislature of the Mexican Congress representing Jalisco, filling the seat of Arturo Zamora Jiménez since 5 March 2013. She also served in the Congress of Jalisco
