= Jose María Martínez Martínez =

Mexican politician (born 1972)

- Born: 9 June 1972 (age 53); Valle de Guadalupe, Jalisco, Mexico
- Occupation: Senator
- Political party: PAN

Jose María Martínez Martínez (born 9 June 1972) is a Mexican politician affiliated with the PAN. He currently serves as Senator of the LXII Legislature of the Mexican Congress representing Jalisco, and previously served in the Congress of Jalisco.
