= María Elvia Amaya Araujo =

Mexican politician

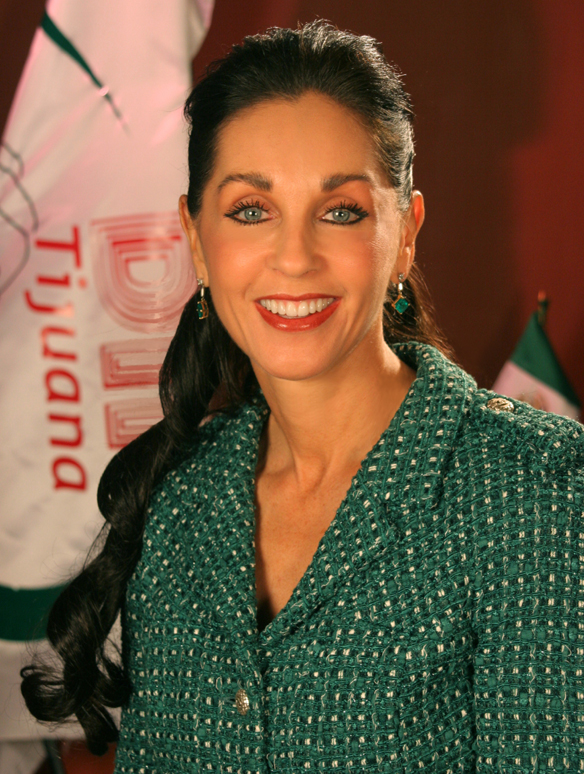
- Born: 27 February 1954; Mexicali, Baja California, Mexico
- Died: 8 September 2012 (aged 58); Tijuana, Mexico
- Occupation: Deputy
- Political party: PRI
- Spouse: Jorge Hank Rhon

María Elvia Amaya Araujo (27 February 1954 – 8 September 2012) was a Mexican psychologist, philanthropist, and politician affiliated with the PRI. She served as Deputy of the LXII Legislature of the Mexican Congress representing Baja California.

She was the daughter of Sergio Amaya Brondo and María Elvia Araujo Montaño. She was married to Jorge Hank Rhon, municipal president of Tijuana from 2004 to 2007 and candidate to the government of Baja California. Hank Rhon is a Mexican businessman. They had nine children.

She died on 8 September 2012 due to multiple myeloma.
