= Irma Martínez Manríquez =

Mexican politician

- Born: Mexicali, Baja California, Mexico
- Occupation: Politician
- Political party: PANAL

Irma Martínez Manríquez (Note: In this Mexican name, the surname is Martínez and the second or maternal family name is Manríquez.) is a Mexican politician affiliated with the New Alliance Party (PANAL). In 2007–2010 she served as a national-list senator during the 60th Congress as the alternate of Rafael Ochoa Guzmán.
