= Mario Sánchez Ruiz =

Mexican politician (born 1961)

- Born: 17 November 1961 (age 64); Ciudad de México, Mexico
- Occupation: Deputy

Mario Sánchez Ruiz (born 17 November 1961) is a Mexican former politician. As of 2013 he served as Deputy of the LXII Legislature of the Mexican Congress representing Sonora.
