= María Ramírez Diez =

Mexican politician

- Born: 8 December 1961 (age 64); Ciudad Valles, San Luis Potosí, Mexico
- Occupation: Deputy
- Political party: PAN

María Concepción Ramírez Diez Gutiérrez (born 8 December 1961) is a Mexican politician affiliated with the PAN. As of 2013 she served as Deputy of the LXII Legislature of the Mexican Congress representing San Luis Potosí.
