= Víctor Manuel Manríquez =

Mexican politician

- Born: 17 April 1982 (age 44); Uruapan, Michoacán, Mexico
- Occupation: Deputy
- Political party: PRD

Víctor Manuel Manríquez González (born 17 April 1982) is a Mexican politician affiliated with the PRD. As of 2013 he served as Deputy of the LXII Legislature of the Mexican Congress representing Michoacán.
