= Tomás Torres Mercado =

Mexican politician

Tomás Torres Mercado (December 15, 1960 – October 22, 2015) was a Mexican politician affiliated with the Ecologist Green Party of Mexico (PVEM) who served as Federal Deputy for the 2012-2015 period.

He was previously elected to serve as senator from 2006 to 2012.

== Biography ==
Torres Mercado served in the cabinet of Governor Ricardo Monreal; he also served as a federal deputy in the Chamber of Deputies of Mexico during the LVIII Legislature.

He was expelled from the PRD in November 2010. He died on 22 October 2015 when the Learjet 31 jet he was travelling on crashed near Apaseo el Alto. He was 54 years old.
