= Miguel Alonso Raya =

Mexican politician (born 1954)

- Born: 28 August 1954 (age 71); Puerta Del Monte, Salvatierra, Guanajuato, Mexico
- Occupation: Deputy
- Political party: PRD (since 1989); PST (former)

Agustín Miguel Alonso Raya (born 28 August 1954) is a Mexican politician affiliated with the PRD.He served as Deputy of both the LIX and LXII Legislatures of the Mexican Congress representing Guanajuato.
