= Jorge Rosiñol Abreu =

Mexican politician

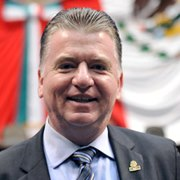
- Born: 18 September 1958 (age 67); Ciudad del Carmen, Campeche, Mexico
- Occupation: Deputy
- Political party: PAN

Jorge Rosiñol Abreu (born 18 September 1958) is a Mexican politician affiliated with the PAN. As of 2013 he served as Deputy of the LXII Legislature of the Mexican Congress representing Campeche.
