= Jorge Mendoza Garza =

Mexican politician

- Born: 1 September 1951 (age 75); Monterrey, Nuevo León, Mexico
- Occupation: Politician
- Political party: PRI

Jorge Mendoza Garza (Note: In this Mexican name, the surname is Mendoza and the second or maternal family name is Garza.) (born 1 September 1951) is a Mexican politician affiliated with the Institutional Revolutionary Party (PRI). He is a native of Monterrey, Nuevo León.

In the 2006 general election, he was elected to the Senate from the PRI's national list and, in the 2012 general election, he was elected to a plurinominal seat in the Chamber of Deputies.
