= Gabriel López Rosado =

Mexican politician

- Born: Oaxaca, Mexico
- Occupation: Deputy
- Political party: PRD

Gabriel López Rosado is a Mexican politician affiliated with the PRD. He served as Deputy of the LXII Legislature of the Mexican Congress representing Oaxaca.
