= Arturo Escobar y Vega =

Mexican politician

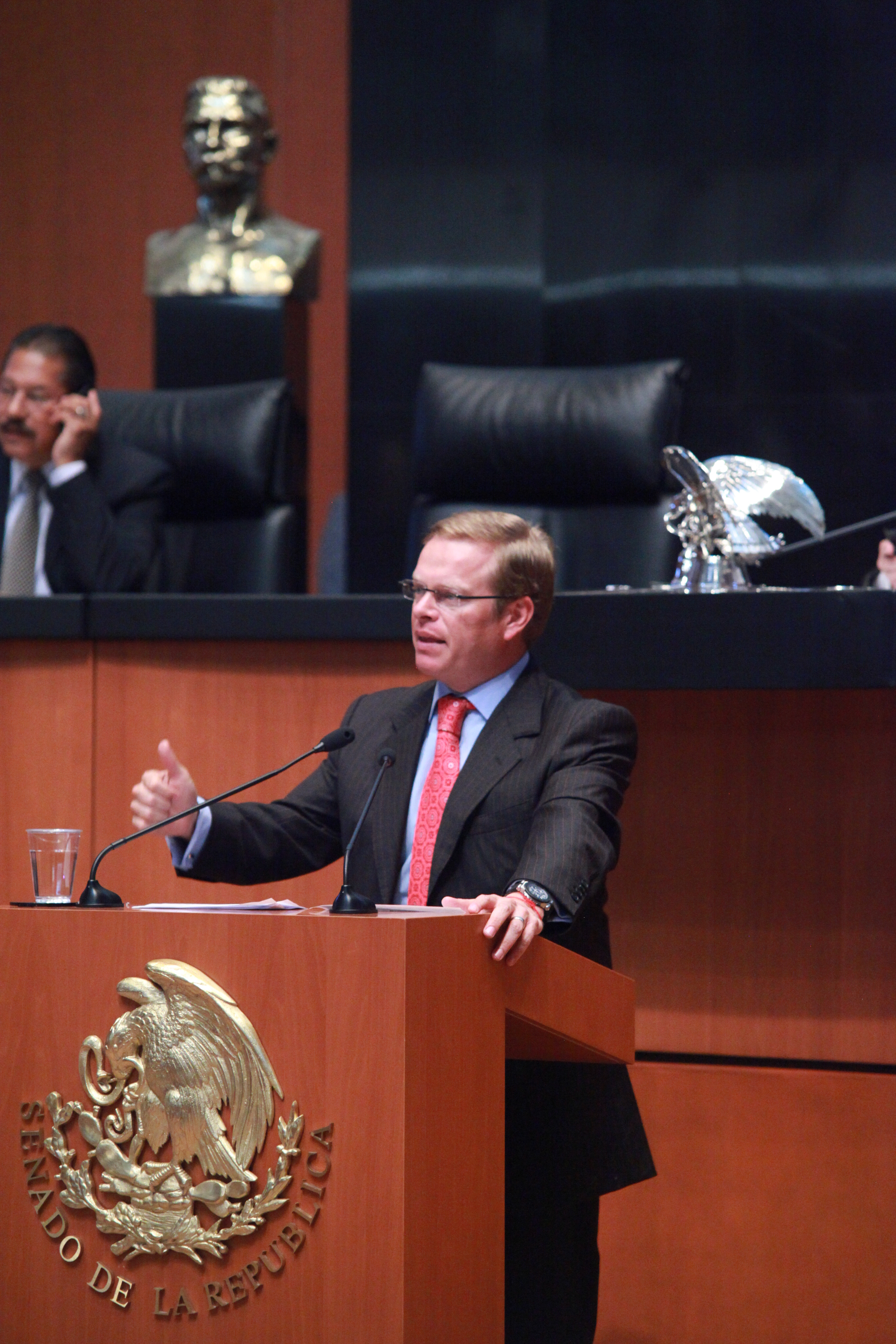
- Born: 23 April 1970 (age 56); Mexico City, Mexico
- Occupation: Politician
- Political party: PVEM

Arturo Escobar y Vega (born 23 April 1970) is a Mexican politician affiliated with the Ecologist Green Party of Mexico (PVEM). Escobar currently serves in the lower house of the Mexican Congress.

Escobar has been an active member and leader of the PVEM who has served as deputy (asambleísta) in the Legislative Assembly of the Federal District. In 2006, he secured a seat in the Senate via the proportional representation.

In November 25, 2015 the Attorney General of Mexico issued an order of arrest to Escobar due suspected electoral crimes. The same day he announced his resignation as undersecretary for Prevention and Citizen Participation from the Secretariat of the Interior to support the investigations.
