= Yesenia Nolasco Ramírez =

Mexican politician

- Born: Yesenia Nolasco Ramírez; 22 August 1982 (age 43); Tehuantepec, Oaxaca, Mexico
- Occupation: Deputy
- Political party: MORENA

Yesenia Nolasco Ramírez (Tehuantepec, Oaxaca; August 22, 1982), Graduated in Law and Mexican politics, member of the National Regeneration Movement party (Morena), Deputy elected of the Congress of the Union for the district XIX of the state of Oaxaca. She was municipal president of Tehuantepec from 2017-2018.
