= LXIII Legislature of the Mexican Congress =

Sitting of the Mexican Congress (2015 to 2018)

63rd Congress LXIII Legislatura
←	62nd	64th	→

Overview
- Legislative body: Congress of the Union
- Meeting place: Palacio Legislativo de San Lázaro (Chamber of Deputies); Edificio del Senado (Senate)
- Term: 1 September 2015 – 31 August 2018
- Election: 7 June 2015

Senate of the Republic
- Members: 128

Chamber of Deputies
- Members: 500

The LXIII Legislature of the Congress of the Union, the 63rd session of the Congress of Mexico, was made up of senators and deputies that are members of their respective chambers. It convened on September 1, 2015, and concluded on August 31, 2018. It was succeeded by the LXIV Legislature in 2018.

Senators were elected to office in the 2012 election for a period of six years and therefore exercised their position also in the previous legislature; the deputies, elected in the 2015 election, only held office in the current legislature.

== Legislation ==
=== New Laws ===
DOF Citation	Title	Votes		Signed by the executive	DOF Publication	Entry date	Active
DOF Citation	Title	Deputies	Senate	Signed by the executive	DOF Publication	Entry date	Active
04-11-2015	Ley Reglamentaria del artículo 6o., párrafo primero, de la Constitución Política de los Estados Unidos Mexicanos, en materia del Derecho de Réplica	5 December 2013 (354-100)	13 October 2015 (73-30)	29 October 2015	4 November 2015	4 December 2015	Yes
18-11-2015	Ley de Ingresos de la Federación para el ejercicio fiscal de 2016	29 October 2015 (410-37)	29 October 2015 (87-20)	13 November 2015	18 November 2015	1 January 2016	No
24-12-2015	Ley de Transición Energética	9 December 2015 (387-31)	10 December 2015 (81-8)	23 December 2015	24 December 2015	25 December 2015	Yes
30-12-2015	Ley de Tesorería de la Federación	18 November 2015 (375-22)	14 December 2015 (80-0)	23 December 2015	30 December 2015	1 January 2016	Yes
12-01-2016	Ley Federal para Prevenir y Sancionar los Delitos Cometidos en Materia de Hidrocarburos	10 December 2015 (340-7)	15 December 2015 (65-22)	11 January 2016	12 January 2016	13 January 2016	Yes
27-04-2016	Ley de Disciplina Financiera de las Entidades Federativas y los Municipios	17 March 2016 (382-0)	15 March 2016 (86-9)	27 April 2016	27 April 2016	28 April 2016	Yes
09-05-2016	Ley Federal de Transparencia y Acceso a la Información Pública	19 April 2016 (383-1)	21 April 2016 (75-4)	6 May 2016	9 May 2016	10 May 2016	Yes
16-05-2016	Código Militar de Procedimientos Penales	21 April 2016 (253-67)	28 April 2016 (78-27)	16 May 2016	16 May 2016	17 May 2016	Yes
01-06-2016	Ley Federal de Zonas Económicas Especiales	27 April 2016 (389-0)	14 April 2016 (89-8)	31 May 2016	1 June 2016	2 June 2016	Yes
16-06-2016	Ley Nacional del Sistema Integral de Justicia Penal para Adolescentes	14 June 2016 (460-0)	27 April 2016 (83-9)	16 June 2016	16 June 2016	18 June 2016	Yes
16-06-2016	Ley Nacional de Ejecución Penal	14 June 2016 (449-0)	27 April 2016 (114-0)	16 June 2016	16 June 2016	17 June 2016	Yes
18-07-2016	Ley de Fiscalización y Rendición de Cuentas de la Federación	16 June 2016 (459-0)	17 June 2016 (107-4)	18 July 2016	18 July 2016	19 July 2016	Yes
18-07-2016	Ley General del Sistema Nacional Anticorrupción	6 July 2016 (346-82)	5 July 2016 (81-19)	18 July 2016	18 July 2016	19 July 2016	Yes
18-07-2016	Ley General de Responsabilidades Administrativas	6 July 2016 (346-82)	5 July 2016 (81-19)	18 July 2016	18 July 2016	19 July 2016	Yes
18-07-2016	Ley Orgánica del Tribunal Federal de Justicia Administrativa	6 July 2016 (346-82)	5 July 2016 (81-19)	18 July 2016	18 July 2016	19 July 2016	Yes

== Senate of the Republic ==
The formation of the 63rd Congress was as follows:

Members of the Senate are elected for a period of six years, three for each of the states and the Federal District, and 32 more for a national list, giving a total of 128 Senators.

=== Number of senators by political party ===
For the internal government of the Senate, senators are grouped by political party for which they were elected in parliamentary groups, each of which is headed by a coordinator. The coordinators of all groups in turn form the Board of Policy Coordination of the Senate.

Party	Senators Relative majority	Senators First minority	Senators. Proportional representation	Total
Institutional Revolutionary Party	30	11	11	52 / 128 (41%)
National Action Party	16	13	9	38 / 128 (30%)
Party of the Democratic Revolution	11	5	6	22 / 128 (17%)
Ecological Green Party of Mexico	6	1	2	9 / 128 (7%)
Labor Party	1	2	2	5 / 128 (4%)
Citizens' Movement	0	0	1	1 / 128 (0.8%)
New Alliance Party	0	0	1	1 / 128 (0.8%)
Total	64	32	32	128
Source: Federal Electoral Institute.

The 128 Senators who make up the LXII Legislature are:

=== Senators by federative entity ===
State	Senator	Party	State	Senator	Party
Aguascalientes	José de Jesús Santana García Replaces Martín Orozco Sandoval		Nayarit	Manuel Cota Jiménez	
Aguascalientes	Fernando Herrera Ávila		Nayarit	Margarita Flores Sánchez	
Aguascalientes	Miguel Romo Medina		Nayarit	Martha Elena García Gómez	
Baja California	Ernesto Ruffo Appel		Nuevo León	Marcela Guerra Castillo	
Baja California	Víctor Hermosillo y Celada		Nuevo León	Ivonne Álvarez García	
Baja California	Marco Antonio Blásquez Salinas		Nuevo León	Raúl Gracia Guzmán	
Baja California Sur	Ricardo Barroso Agramont		Oaxaca	Félix Benjamín Hernández Ruiz Replaces Benjamín Robles Montoya	
Baja California Sur	Isaías González Cuevas		Oaxaca	Adolfo Romero Laines	
Baja California Sur	Juan Fernández Sánchez Navarro Replaces Carlos Mendoza Davis		Oaxaca	Jorge Toledo Luis Replaces Eviel Pérez Magaña	
Campeche	Raúl Aarón Pozos Lanz		Puebla	María del Carmen Izaguirre Francos Replaces Blanca Alcalá Ruiz	
Campeche	Óscar Román Rosas González		Puebla	María Lucero Saldaña	
Campeche	Jorge Luis Lavalle Maury		Puebla	Javier Lozano Alarcón	
Chiapas	Luis Armando Melgar Bravo		Querétaro	Sonia Rocha Acosta Replaces Francisco Domínguez Servien	
Chiapas	Roberto Albores Gleason		Querétaro	Marcela Torres Peimbert	
Chiapas	Zoé Robledo Aburto		Querétaro	Enrique Burgos García	
Chihuahua	Patricio Martínez García		Quintana Roo	Jorge Aréchiga Ávila Replaces Jorge Emilio González Martínez	
Chihuahua	Lilia Merodio Reza		Quintana Roo	Félix González Canto	
Chihuahua	Sylvia Martínez Elizondo Replaces Javier Corral Jurado		Quintana Roo	Luz María Beristain Navarrete	
Coahuila	Luis Fernando Salazar Fernández		San Luis Potosí	Sonia Mendoza Díaz	
Coahuila	Silvia Guadalupe Garza		San Luis Potosí	Octavio Pedroza Gaitán	
Coahuila	Tereso Medina Ramírez Replaces Braulio Manuel Fernández Aguirre		San Luis Potosí	Teófilo Torres Corzo	
Colima	Hilda Ceballos Llerenas Replaces Mely Romero Celis		Sinaloa	Aarón Irizar López	
Colima	Itzel Ríos de la Mora		Sinaloa	Daniel Amador Gaxiola	
Colima	Jorge Luis Preciado Rodríguez		Sinaloa	Francisco López Brito	
Durango	Ismael Hernández Deras		Sonora	Anabel Acosta Islas Replaces Claudia Pavlovich Arellano	
Durango	Yolanda de la Torre Valdéz Replaces Leticia Herrera Ale		Sonora	Ernesto Gándara Camou	
Durango	Héctor David Flores Ávalos Replaces José Rosas Aispuro		Sonora	Francisco Búrquez Valenzuela	
Guanajuato	Fernando Torres Graciano		Tabasco	Carlos Manuel Merino Campos Replaces Adán Augusto López Hernández	
Guanajuato	Juan Carlos Romero Hicks		Tabasco	Fernando Mayans Canabal	
Guanajuato	Miguel Ángel Chico Herrera		Tabasco	Humberto Mayans Canabal	
Guerrero	Armando Ríos Piter		Tamaulipas	Sandra Luz García Guajardo Replaces Francisco García Cabeza de Vaca	
Guerrero	Sofía Ramírez Hernández		Tamaulipas	Andrea García García Replaces Maki Esther Ortiz Domínguez	
Guerrero	René Juárez Cisneros		Tamaulipas	Manuel Cavazos Lerma	
Hidalgo	Jesús Priego Calva Replaces Omar Fayad		Tlaxcala	Alejandra Roldán Benítez Replaces Lorena Cuéllar Cisneros	
Hidalgo	Carmen Dorantes Martínez Replaces David Penchyna Grub		Tlaxcala	María de los Ángeles González Rodríguez Replaces Martha Palafox Gutiérrez	
Hidalgo	Isidro Pedraza Chávez		Tlaxcala	Amelia Torres López Replaces Adriana Dávila Fernández	
Jalisco	Arturo Zamora Jiménez		Veracruz	José Francisco Yunes Zorrilla	
Jalisco	Jesús Casillas Romero		Veracruz	Erika Ayala Ríos Replaces Héctor Yunes Landa	
Jalisco	José María Martínez Martínez		Veracruz	Fernando Yunes Márquez	
México	Ana Lilia Herrera Anzaldo		Yucatán	Daniel Ávila Ruiz	
México	María Elena Barrera Tapia		Yucatán	Rosa Adriana Díaz Lizama	
México	Alejandro Encinas		Yucatán	Angélica Araujo Lara	
Michoacán	Ascensión Orihuela Bárcenas		Zacatecas	Carlos Alberto Puente Salas	
Michoacán	Rocío Pineda Gochi		Zacatecas	José Marco Antonio Olvera Acevedo Replaces Alejandro Tello Cristerna	
Michoacán	Raúl Morón Orozco		Zacatecas	Héctor Adrián Menchaca Medrano Replaces David Monreal Ávila	
Morelos	Fidel Demedicis Hidalgo		Ciudad de México	Martha Angélica Tagle Martínez Replaces Alejandra Barrales	No party
Morelos	Rabindranath Salazar Solorio		Ciudad de México	Mario Delgado Carrillo	
Morelos	Lisbeth Hernández Lecona		Ciudad de México	Pablo Escudero Morales	

=== Senators by national list ===
Senator	Party	Senator	Party	Senator	Party
Ernesto Cordero Arroyo		Armando Neyra Chávez		Luis Sánchez Jiménez	
Mariana Gómez del Campo		Diva Hadamira Gastélum		Dolores Padierna Luna	
Roberto Gil Zuarth		Gerardo Sánchez García		Luis Humberto Fernández Fuentes; Replaces Manuel Camacho Solís	
Luisa María Calderón Hinojosa		Graciela Ortiz González		Iris Vianey Mendoza Mendoza	
Salvador Vega Casillas		Carlos Romero Deschamps		Manuel Bartlett Díaz	
Gabriela Cuevas		María Hilaria Domínguez Arvizu; Replaces Arely Gómez González		Ana Gabriela Guevara	
María del Pílar Ortega Martínez; Replaces Alonso Lujambio		Joel Ayala		Ninfa Saltworks Sada	
Laura Angélica Rojas Hernández		Hilda Esthela Flores Escalera		Juan Gerardo Flores Ramírez	
Héctor Larios Córdova		Raúl Cervantes Andrade		Layda Elena Sansores San Román	
Emilio Gamboa Patrón		Miguel Barbosa Huerta		Manuel Cárdenas Fonseca Replaces Mónica Arriola Gordillo	No party
Cristina Díaz Salazar		Angélica de la Peña Gómez			

=== Parliamentary coordinators ===
- National Action Party:
  - (2015 – ): Fernando Herrera Ávila
- Institutional Revolutionary Party:
  - Emilio Gamboa Pattern
- Party of the Democratic Revolution:
  - Miguel Barbosa Huerta
- Ecologist Green Party of Mexico:
  - Jorge Emilio González Martínez
- Labor Party:
  - Manuel Bartlett Díaz

== Chamber of Deputies ==
The Chamber of Deputies is composed of 500 elected legislators for a period of 3 years and nonreeligible for the immediate period . 300 deputies are elected by direct vote for each one of the Electoral Districts of the country, and the other 200 by a system voted in each of the Constituencies lists.

The composition of the Chamber of Deputies in the Legislature LXIII is as follows :

=== Number of deputies by political party ===
Party	Deputies Relative Majority	Deputies Proportional Representation	Total
Institutional Revolutionary Party	160	47	207
National Action Party	56	53	109
Party of the Democratic Revolution	33	27	60
Ecologist Green Party of Mexico	24	18	42
National Regeneration Movement	14	21	35
Citizen's Movement	10	15	25
New Alliance Party	1	10	11
Social Encounter Party	0	8	8
Without party	1	0	1
Independent candidate	1	0	1
Total	300	199	499

=== Deputies by single-member district (relative majority) ===
State	District	Deputy	Party	State	District	Deputy	Party
Aguascalientes	1	Gerardo Federico Salas Díaz		México	26	Laura Mitzi Barrientos Cano	
Aguascalientes	2	Arlette Ivette Muñoz Cervantes		México	27	Carolina Monroy del Mazo	
Aguascalientes	3	Jorge López Martín		México	28	Rocío Díaz Montoya	
Baja California	1	Exaltación González Ceceña		México	29	Olga Catalán Padilla	
Baja California	2	Luz Argelia Paniagua Figueroa		México	30	David Gerson García Calderón	
Baja California	3	Wenceslao Martínez Santos		México	31	Armando Soto Espino	
Baja California	4	Jorge Ramos Hernández		México	32	Alma Lilia Luna Munguía	
Baja California	5	Máximo García López		México	33	Susana Osorno Belmont	
Baja California	6	María Luisa Sánchez Meza		México	34	Martha Hilda González Calderón	
Baja California	7	María del Rosario Rodríguez Rubio		México	35	Leydi Fabiola Leyva García	
Baja California	8	Jacqueline Nava Mouett		México	36	Iveth Bernal Casique	
Baja California Sur	1	Jisela Paes Martínez		México	37	Gabriel Casillas Zanatta	
Baja California Sur	2	Víctor Ernesto Ibarra Montoya		México	38	Delfina Gómez Álvarez	
Campeche	1	Miguel Ángel Sulub Caamal		México	39	Andrés Aguirre Romero	
Campeche	2	Rocío Matesanz Santamaría		México	40	Olga María Esquivel Hernández	
Chiapas	1	Leonardo Rafael Guirao Aguilar		Michoacán	1	Salomón Fernando Rosales Reyes	
Chiapas	2	Hernán de Jesús Orantes López		Michoacán	2	Erik Juárez Blanquet	
Chiapas	3	Jorge Álvarez López		Michoacán	3	Juan Antonio Ixtláhuac Orihuela	
Chiapas	4	Flor Ángel Jiménez Jiménez		Michoacán	4	Alfredo Anaya Orozco	
Chiapas	5	María Soledad Sandoval Martínez		Michoacán	5	Rosa Alicia Álvarez Piñones	
Chiapas	6	Dora Luz de León Villard Sasil		Michoacán	6	Norberto Antonio Martínez Soto	
Chiapas	7	Diego Valente Valera Fuentes		Michoacán	7	José Guadalupe Hernández Alcalá	
Chiapas	8	Luis Ignacio Avendaño Bermúdez		Michoacán	8	Marco Polo Aguirre Chávez	
Chiapas	9	Emilio Enrique Salazar Farías		Michoacán	9	Ángel II Alanís Pedraza	
Chiapas	10	Julián Nazar Morales		Michoacán	10	Daniela de los Santos Torres	
Chiapas	11	Enrique Zamora Morlet		Michoacán	11	Araceli Saucedo Reyes	
Chiapas	12	Samuel Alexis Chacón Morales		Michoacán	12	Omar Noé Bernardino Vargas	
Chihuahua	1	Fernando Uriarte Zazueta		Morelos	1	Edmundo Javier Bolaños Aguilar	
Chihuahua	2	Georgina Zapata Trujillo		Morelos	2	Héctor Javier García Chávez	
Chihuahua	3	María Ávila Serna		Morelos	3	Lucía Virginia Meza Guzmán	
Chihuahua	4	Adriana Terrazas Porras		Morelos	4	Rosalina Mazari Espín	
Chihuahua	5	Juan Antonio Meléndez Ortega		Morelos	5	Ángel García Yáñez	
Chihuahua	6	Daniel Olivas Gutiérrez Replaces Juan Blanco Zaldívar		Nayarit	1	Efraín Arellano Núñez	
Chihuahua	7	Alex LeBarón González		Nayarit	2	Gianni Raúl Ramírez Ocampo	
Chihuahua	8	Alejandro Domínguez Domínguez		Nayarit	3	Jasmine María Bugarín Rodríguez	
Chihuahua	9	Carlos Hermosillo Arteaga		Nuevo León	1	Ximena Tamariz García	
Coahuila	1	Francisco Saracho Navarro		Nuevo León	2	Juan Manuel Cavazos Baldera	
Coahuila	2	Ana María Boone Godoy		Nuevo León	3	Juana Aurora Cavazos Cavazos	
Coahuila	3	María Guadalupe Oyervides Valdez		Nuevo León	4	Carlos Alberto de la Fuente Flores	
Coahuila	4	Armando Luna Canales		Nuevo León	5	Federico Vargas Rodríguez	
Coahuila	5	Flor Estela Rentería Medina		Nuevo León	6	José Adrián González Navarro	
Coahuila	6	José Refugio Sandoval Rodríguez		Nuevo León	7	Pablo Elizondo García	
Coahuila	7	Jericó Abramo Masso		Nuevo León	8	Daniel Torres Cantú	
Colima	1	Enrique Rojas Orozco		Nuevo León	9	Ramón Villagómez Guerrero	
Colima	2	Eloísa Chavarrías Barajas		Nuevo León	10	Juan Carlos Ruiz García	
Distrito Federal	1	Alberto Martínez Urincho		Nuevo León	11	Pedro Garza Treviño	
Distrito Federal	2	Juan Romero Tenorio		Nuevo León	12	Edgar Romo García	
Distrito Federal	3	Virgilio Caballero Pedraza		Oaxaca	1	Antonio Amaro Cancino	
Distrito Federal	4	Ernestina Godoy Ramos		Oaxaca	2	Álvaro Rafael Rubio	
Distrito Federal	5	Patricia Elena Aceves Pastrana		Oaxaca	3	Edith Yolanda López Velasco	
Distrito Federal	6	Jesús Emiliano Álvarez López		Oaxaca	4	Vitalico Cándido Coheto Martínez	
Distrito Federal	7	María Chávez García		Oaxaca	5	Jose Antonio Estefan Garfias	
Distrito Federal	8	Vidal Llerenas Morales		Oaxaca	6	Sergio López Sánchez	
Distrito Federal	9	Evelyn Parra Álvarez		Oaxaca	7	Yarith Tannos Cruz	
Distrito Federal	10	Jorge Triana Tena		Oaxaca	8	Francisco Martínez Neri	
Distrito Federal	11	Rafael Hernández Soriano		Oaxaca	9	Eva Florinda Cruz Molina	
Distrito Federal	12	Alicia Barrientos Pantoja		Oaxaca	10	Óscar Valencia García	
Distrito Federal	13	Daniel Ordóñez Hernández		Oaxaca	11	Carlos Sarabia Camacho	
Distrito Federal	14	Carlos Hernánez Mirón		Puebla	1	Carlos Barragán Amador	
Distrito Federal	15	Federico Döring Casar		Puebla	2	José Lorenzo Rivera Sosa	
Distrito Federal	16	Martha Laura Almaraz Domínguez		Puebla	3	Juan Pablo Piña Kurczyn	
Distrito Federal	17	Sara Paola Gálico Félix Díaz		Puebla	4	Hugo Alejo Domínguez	
Distrito Federal	18	Arturo Santana Alfaro		Puebla	5	Rubén Garrido Muñoz	
Distrito Federal	19	Jerónimo Alejandro Ojeda Anguiano		Puebla	6	Xitlalic Ceja García	
Distrito Federal	20	Araceli Damián González		Puebla	7	Alejandro Armenta Mier	
Distrito Federal	21	Claudia Villanueva Huerta		Puebla	8	Lilia Arminda García Escobar	
Distrito Federal	22	Ana Leticia Carrera Hernández		Puebla	9	Genoveva Huerta Villegas	
Distrito Federal	23	Ariadna Montiel Reyes		Puebla	10	Miguel Ángel Huepa Pérez	
Distrito Federal	24	Héctor Barrera Marmolejo		Puebla	11	Elvia Graciela Palomares Ramírez	
Distrito Federal	25	Renato Jobafat Molina Arias		Puebla	12	Víctor Manuel Giorgana Jiménez	
Distrito Federal	26	María de la Paz Quiñones Cornejo		Puebla	13	Juan Manuel Celis Aguirre	
Distrito Federal	27	Norma Xochitl Hernández Colin		Puebla	14	Jorge Estefan Chidiac	
Durango	1	Otinel García Navarro		Puebla	15	Sergio Emilio Gómez Olivier	
Durango	2	María del Rocío Rebollo Mendoza		Puebla	16	Edith Villa Trujillo	
Durango	3	Óscar García Barrón		Querétaro	1	José Hugo Cabrera Ruiz	
Durango	4	Alicia Guadalupe Gamboa Martínez		Querétaro	2	María García Pérez	
Guanajuato	1	Timoteo Villa Ramírez		Querétaro	3	Gerardo Gabriel Cuanalo Santos	
Guanajuato	2	María Verónica Agundis Estrada		Querétaro	4	J. Apolinar Casillas Gutiérrez	
Guanajuato	3	Ricardo Sheffield Padilla		Quintana Roo	1	José Luis Toledo Medina	
Guanajuato	4	Erika Lorena Arroyo Bello		Quintana Roo	2	Arlet Mólgora Glover	
Guanajuato	5	Alejandra Noemí Reynoso Sánchez		Quintana Roo	3	Mario Machuca Sánchez Replaces Remberto Estrada Barba	
Guanajuato	6	Alejandra Gutiérrez Campos		San Luis Potosí	1	Ruth Noemí Tiscareño Agoitia	
Guanajuato	7	María de la Consolación Castañón Márquez		San Luis Potosí	2	Erika Irazema Briones Pérez	
Guanajuato	8	Karina Padilla Ávila		San Luis Potosí	3	Fabiola Guerrero Aguilar	
Guanajuato	9	Yulma Rocha Aguilar		San Luis Potosí	4	Cándido Ochoa Rojas	
Guanajuato	10	David Mercado Ruiz		San Luis Potosí	5	María de los Ángeles Rodríguez Aguirre	
Guanajuato	11	Felipe Arredondo García		San Luis Potosí	6	Francisco Xavier Nava Palacios	
Guanajuato	12	Adriana Elizarraraz Sandoval		San Luis Potosí	7	Christian Joaquín Sánchez Sánchez	
Guanajuato	13	Ariel Enrique Corona Rodríguez		Sinaloa	1	Gloria Hilmelda Félix Niebla	
Guanajuato	14	César Larrondo Díaz		Sinaloa	2	Bernardino Antelo Esper	
Guerrero	1	Silvia Rivera Carbajal		Sinaloa	3	Evelio Plata Inzunza	
Guerrero	2	Salomón Majul González		Sinaloa	4	Jesús Antonio López Rodríguez	
Guerrero	3	Ricardo Ángel Barrientos Ríos		Sinaloa	5	Manuel Clouthier Carrillo	
Guerrero	4	Julieta Fernández Márquez		Sinaloa	6	Germán Escobar Manjarrez	
Guerrero	5	Victoriano Wences Real		Sinaloa	7	Rosa Elena Millán Bueno	
Guerrero	6	Verónica Muñoz Parra		Sinaloa	8	José de Jesús Galindo Rosas; Replaces Quirino Ordaz Coppel	
Guerrero	7	Beatriz Vélez Núñez		Sonora	1	José Everardo López Córdova	
Guerrero	8	Arturo Álvarez Angli		Sonora	2	Leticia Amparano Gámez	
Guerrero	9	Ricardo Taja Ramírez		Sonora	3	Javier Antonio Neblina Vega	
Hidalgo	1	Carolina Viggiano Austria		Sonora	4	Susana Corella Platt	
Hidalgo	2	Rosa Guadalupe Chávez Acosta		Sonora	5	Héctor Ulises Cristópulos Ríos	
Hidalgo	3	Pedro Luis Noble Monterrubio		Sonora	6	Abel Murrieta Gutiérrez	
Hidalgo	4	Cesáreo Jorge Máquez Alvarado		Sonora	7	Próspero Manuel Ibarra Otero	
Hidalgo	5	Fernando Quetzalcóatl Moctezuma Perereda		Tabasco	1	Elio Bocanegra Ruiz	
Hidalgo	6	Alfredo Bejos Nicolás		Tabasco	2	Óscar Ferrer Abalos	
Hidalgo	7	María Gloria Hernández Madrid		Tabasco	3	Héctor Peralta Grappin	
Jalisco	1	Hugo Daniel Gaeta Esparza		Tabasco	4	Liliana Ivete Madrigal Méndez	
Jalisco	2	Evelyn Soraya Flores Carranza		Tabasco	5	Araceli Madrigal Sánchez	
Jalisco	3	Elías Octavio Íñiguez Mejía		Tabasco	6	José del Pilar Córdova Hernández	
Jalisco	4	Laura Valeria Guzmán Vázquez		Tamaulipas	1	Yahleel Abdala Carmona	
Jalisco	5	Luis Ernesto Munguía González		Tamaulipas	2	María Esther Camargo Félix	
Jalisco	6	Mirza Flores Gómez		Tamaulipas	3	Edgardo Melhem Salinas	
Jalisco	7	Laura Nereida Plascencia Pacheco		Tamaulipas	4	Jesús de la Garza Díaz del Guante	
Jalisco	8	Verónica Delgadillo García		Tamaulipas	5	Miguel Ángel González Salum	
Jalisco	9	María Candelaria Ochoa Ávalos		Tamaulipas	6	Luis Alejandro Guevara Cobos	
Jalisco	10	Macedonio Salomón Támez Guajardo		Tamaulipas	7	Esdras Romero Vega	
Jalisco	11	Jonadab Martínez García		Tamaulipas	8	Mercedes del Carmen Guillén Vicente	
Jalisco	12	Salvador Zamora Zamora		Tlaxcala	1	Rosalinda Muñoz Sánchez	
Jalisco	13	Rosa Alba Ramírez Nachis		Tlaxcala	2	Edith Anabel Alvarado Varela	
Jalisco	14	Víctor Manuel Sánchez Orozco		Tlaxcala	3	Ricardo David García Portilla	
Jalisco	15	Ramón Bañales Arambula		Veracruz	1	Sofía del Sagrario de León Maza	
Jalisco	16	Germán Ernesto Ralis Cumplido		Veracruz	2	María del Carmen Pinete Vargas	
Jalisco	17	Martha Lorena Covarrubias Anaya		Veracruz	3	Alberto Silva Ramos	
Jalisco	18	Jesús Zúñiga Mendoza		Veracruz	4	Francisco José Gutiérrez de Velasco Urtaza	
Jalisco	19	José Luis Orozco Sánchez Aldana		Veracruz	5	Leonardo Amador Rodríguez	
México	1	Edgar Castillo Martínez		Veracruz	6	Heidi Salazar Espinosa	
México	2	Raúl Domínguez Rex		Veracruz	7	Edgar Spinoso Carrera	
México	3	Fidel Almanza Monroy		Veracruz	8	Adolfo Mota Hernández	
México	4	María Monserrath Sobreyra Santos		Veracruz	9	Noemí Guzmán Lagunes	
México	5	Cristina Sánchez Coronel		Veracruz	10	Cuitláhuac García Jiménez	
México	6	David Sánchez Isidoro		Veracruz	11	Rocío Nahle García	
México	7	Francisco Lauro Rojas San Román		Veracruz	12	Gabriela Ramírez Ramos	
México	8	Sandra Méndez Hernández		Veracruz	13	Miguel Ángel Sedas Castro	
México	9	Dora Elena Real Salinas		Veracruz	14	José Luis Sáenz Soto	
México	10	Virginia Nallely Gutiérrez Ramírez		Veracruz	15	Fidel Kuri Grajales	
México	11	Pablo Bedolla López		Veracruz	16	Marco Antonio Aguilar Yunes	
México	12	Maricela Serrano Hernández		Veracruz	17	Antonio Tarek Abdalá Saad	
México	13	José Alfredo Torres Huitrón		Veracruz	18	Lillián Zepahua García	
México	14	Ingrid Krasopani Schemelensky Castro		Veracruz	19	Jorge Alejandro Carvallo Delfín	
México	15	Román Francisco Cortés Lugo		Veracruz	20	Erick Alejandro Lagos Hernández	
México	16	María Isabel Maya Pineda		Veracruz	21	Cirilo Vázquez Parissi	
México	17	Luis Felipe Vázquez Guerrero		Yucatán	1	Liborio Vidal Aguilar	
México	18	Alfredo del Mazo Maza		Yucatán	2	Lucely del Perpetuo Socorro Alpizar Carrillo	
México	19	Pablo Basáñez García		Yucatán	3	Pablo Gamboa Miner	
México	20	José Santiago López		Yucatán	4	Francisco Alberto Torres Rivas	
México	21	Luis Gilberto Marrón Agustín		Yucatán	5	Felipe Cervera Hernández	
México	22	Angélica Moya Marín		Zacatecas	1	Benjamín Medrano Quezada	
México	23	José Ignacio Pichardo Lechuga		Zacatecas	2	Francisco Escobedo Villegas	
México	24	Alejandro Juraidini Villaseñor		Zacatecas	3	Claudia Edith Anaya Mota	
México	25	Telésforo García Carreón		Zacatecas	4	Araceli Guerrero Esquivel	

=== Deputies by proportional representation ===
Region	Deputy	Party	Region	Deputy	Party
First	Gustavo Madero Muñoz		Third	Natalia Karina Barrón Ortiz	
First	María Eloísa Talavera Hernández		Third	Julio Saldaña Morán	
First	Teresa de Jesús Lizárraga Figueroa		Third	Isaura Ivanova Pool Pech	
First	Luis Agustín Rodríguez Torres		Third	Eduardo Francisco Zenteno Núñez	
First	Herminio Corral Estrada		Third	Paloma Canales Suárez	
First	Mariana Arámbula Meléndez		Third	Javier Octavio Herrera Borunda	
First	José Teodoro Barraza López		Third	Adriana Sarur Torre	
First	Nadia Haydeé Vega Olivas		Third	José Alberto Couttolec Buentello	
First	Alfredo Miguel Herrera Deras		Third	Sofía González Torres	
First	Cristina Jiménez Márquez		Third	Andrés Fernández del Valle Laisequilla	
First	Rafael Valenzuela Armas		Third	María Elena Orantes López	
First	Gina Cruz Blackledge		Third	Manuel Alexander Zetina Aguiluz	
First	José Hernán Cortés Berumen		Third	Karina Sánchez Ruiz	
First	David López Gutiérrez		Third	Rogerio Castro Vázquez	
First	Esthela Ponce Beltrán		Third	Guadalupe Hernández Correa	
First	Enrique Jackson		Third	Jorge Tello López	
First	Martha Sofía Tamayo Morales		Third	Modesta Fuentes Alonso	
First	Rafael Yerena Zambrano		Third	Guillermo Rafael Santiago Rodríguez	
First	Yolanda de la Torre Valdez		Third	Gonzalo Guizar Valladares	
First	Marco Antonio García Ayala		Third	Sara Latife Ruiz Chávez	
First	Sylvana Beltrones Sánchez		Fourth	Eukid Castañón Herrera	
First	Francisco Javier Santillán Oceguera		Fourth	Cecilia Romero Castillo	
First	Nancy Guadalupe Sánchez Arredondo		Fourth	Santiago Taboada Cortina	
First	Guadalupe Acosta Naranjo		Fourth	Mónica Rodríguez Della Vecchia	
First	Hortensia Aragón Castillo		Fourth	Juan Corral Mier	
First	Jesús Sesma Suárez		Fourth	Emma Margarita Alemán Olvera	
First	Lorena Corona Valdés		Fourth	Santiago Torreblanca Engell	
First	Clemente Castañeda Hoeflich		Fourth	Guadalupe González Suástegui	
First	Verónica Delgadillo García		Fourth	Manuel Vallejo Barragán	
First	Carlos Lomelí Bolaños		Fourth	María Esther Scherman	
First	María Victoria Mercado Sánchez		Fourth	Fernando Navarrete Pérez	
First	Jorge Álvarez Máynez		Fourth	Carmen Salinas	
First	Refugio Trinidad Garzón Canchola		Fourth	Matías Nazario Morales	
First	Moisés Guerra Mota		Fourth	Hersilia Onfalia Adamina Córdova Morán	
First	Luis Alfredo Valles Mendoza		Fourth	Jesús Zambrano Grijalva	
First	María Luisa Gutiérrez Santoyo		Fourth	Cristina Ismene Gaytán Hernández	
First	Roberto Alejandro Cañedo Jiménez		Fourth	Luis Maldonado Venegas	
First	María Antonia Cárdenas Mariscal		Fourth	Maricela Contreras Julián	
First	José Alfredo Ferreiro Velazco		Fourth	Juan Fernando Rubio Quiroz	
First	Norma Edith Martínez Guzmán		Fourth	Cecilia Soto	
Second	Alfredo Javier Rodríguez Dávila		Fourth	Jesús Valencia Guzmán	
Second	Mayra Angélica Enríquez Vanderkam		Fourth	Lluvia Flores Sonduk	
Second	Armando Alejandro Rivera Castillejos		Fourth	Lía Limón García	
Second	Lorena del Carmen Alfaro García		Fourth	Jesús Gerardo Izquierdo Rojas	
Second	Baltazar Martínez Montemayor		Fourth	Sharon María Teresa Cuenca Ayala	
Second	Elva Lidia Valles Olvera		Fourth	René Cervera García	
Second	César Flores Sosa		Fourth	Marbella Toledo Ibarra	
Second	Guadalupe Murguía Gutiérrez		Fourth	Adán Pérez Utrera	
Second	Marco Antonio Gama Basarte		Fourth	José Bernardo Quezada Salas	
Second	Patricia García García		Fourth	María Eugenia Ocampo Bedolla	
Second	Leonel Gerardo Cordero Lerma		Fourth	Ángel Antonio Hernández de la Peña	
Second	Brenda Velázquez Valdez		Fourth	Irma Rebeca López López	
Second	Miguel Ángel Salim Alle		Fourth	Rodrigo Abdalá Dartigues	
Second	Karla Karina Osuna Carranco		Fourth	Blanca Margarita Cuata Domínguez	
Second	César Augusto Rendón García		Fourth	Miguel Alva y Alva	
Second	Jorge Enrique Dávila Flores		Fourth	Laura Beatriz Esquivel Valdés	
Second	Bárbara Botello Santibáñez		Fourth	Roberto Guzmán Jacobo	
Second	Baltazar Hinojosa Ochoa		Fourth	Blandina Ramos Ramírez	
Second	Maricela Emilse Etcheverry Aranda		Fourth	Hugo Eric Flores Cervantes	
Second	Javier Guerrero García		Fourth	Melissa Torres Sandoval	
Second	Delia Guerrero Coronado		Fifth	Ulises Ramírez Núñez	
Second	Tomás Roberto Montoya Díaz		Fifth	Minerva Hernández Ramos	
Second	Montserrat Alicia Arcos Velázquez		Fifth	Marko Cortés Mendoza	
Second	Álvaro Ibarra Hinojosa		Fifth	Gretel Culin Jaime	
Second	Miriam Dennis Ibarra Rangel		Fifth	José Antonio Salas Valencia	
Second	Braulio Mario Guerra Urbiola		Fifth	Marisol Vargas Bárcena	
Second	Agustín Basave Benítez		Fifth	Carlos Bello Otero	
Second	Tania Victoria Arguijo Herrera		Fifth	Claudia Sánchez Juárez	
Second	Waldo Fernández González		Fifth	Luis Fernando Antero Valle	
Second	Ricardo Canavati Tafich		Fifth	César Camacho Quiroz	
Second	Wendolin Toledo Aceves		Fifth	Marcela González Salas	
Second	José Antonio Arévalo González		Fifth	Tristán Canales	
Second	Alma Lucía Arzaluz Alonso		Fifth	Erika Araceli Rodríguez Hernández	
Second	Gustavo Cárdenas Gutiérrez		Fifth	Carlos Iriarte Mercado	
Second	Claudia Corichi García		Fifth	María Angélica Mondragón Orozco	
Second	Soralla Bañuelos de la Torre		Fifth	Víctor Silva Tejeda	
Second	Jesús Rafael Méndez Salas		Fifth	María Guadalupe Alcántara Rojas	
Second	Alfredo Basurto Román		Fifth	Héctor Javier Álvarez Ortiz	
Second	Mariano Trejo Flores		Fifth	Nora Liliana Oropeza Olguín	
Second	Abdies Pineda Morín		Fifth	Pedro Alberto Salazar Muciño	
Third	Enrique Pérez Rodríguez; Replaces Miguel Ángel Yunes Linares		Fifth	Omar Ortega Álvarez	
Third	Janette Ovando Reazola		Fifth	Karen Hurtado Arana	
Third	Joaquín Díaz Mena		Fifth	Tomás Octaviano Félix	
Third	Kathia María Bolio Pinelo		Fifth	María Elida Castelán Mondragón	
Third	Enrique Cambranis Torres		Fifth	Fidel Calderón Torreblanca	
Third	Nelly del Carmen Márquez Zapata		Fifth	Miriam Tinoco Soto	
Third	Luis de León Martínez Sánchez		Fifth	David Jiménez Rumbo	
Third	Patricia Sánchez Carrillo		Fifth	María Luisa Beltrán Reyes	
Third	Jorge Carlos Ramírez Marín		Fifth	Virgilio Mendoza Amezcua	
Third	Ivonne Ortega Pacheco		Fifth	Jorgina Gaxiola Lezama	
Third	Virgilio Méndez Bazán		Fifth	Manuel Espino	
Third	Adriana del Pilar Ortiz Lanz		Fifth	Angie Denisse Hauffen Torres	
Third	Carlos Federico Quinto Guillén		Fifth	Angélica Reyes Ávila	
Third	Mariana Benítez Tiburcio		Fifth	Jorge Gaviño Ambriz	
Third	Oswaldo Guillermo Cházaro Montalvo		Fifth	Concepción Villa González	
Third	Georgina Trujillo Zentella		Fifth	Mario Ariel Juárez Rodríguez	
Third	David Aguilar Robles		Fifth	Sandra Luz Venegas Falcon	
Third	Candelario Pérez Alvarado		Fifth	Jesús Serrano Lora	
Third	Karen Orney Ramírez Peralta		Fifth	Alejandro González Murillo	
Third	Felipe Reyes Álvarez		Fifth	Martha Teresa Soto García	

=== Presidents of the Chamber of Deputies ===
- (2015-2016): Jesús Zambrano Grijalva
- (2016-2017): Javier Bolaños Aguilar
- (2017-): Jorge Carlos Ramírez Marín

=== Parliamentary coordinators ===
- National Action Party:
  - Marko Cortés Mendoza
- Institutional Revolutionary Party:
  - César Camacho Quiroz
- Party of the Democratic Revolution:
  - Francisco Martínez Neri
- Ecologist Green Party of Mexico:
  - Jesús Sesma Suárez
- Citizen's Movement:
  - Clemente Castañeda Hoeflich
- New Alliance:
  - Alfredo Valles Mendoza
- National Regeneration Movement:
  - Rocío Nahle García
- Social Encounter Party
  - Alejandro González Murillo

== See also ==
- Senate of Mexico
- Chamber of Deputies of Mexico
- Politics of Mexico

Preceded by LXII Legislature	LXIII Legislature; September 2015 to August 2018	Succeeded by LXIV Legislature
