= Constituent Assembly of Mexico City =

Assembly elected to draft a new constitution for Mexico City in 2017

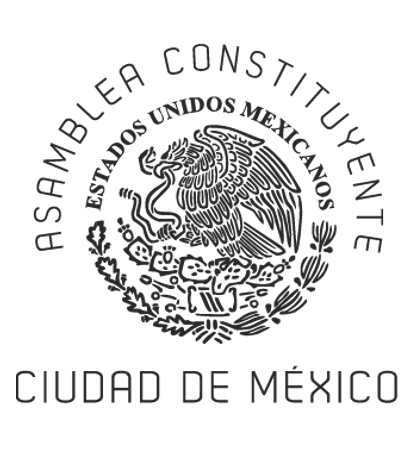
Logo of the Constituent Assembly of Mexico City

The Constituent Assembly of Mexico City (Asamblea Constituyente de la Ciudad de México) is a body formed to create a new constitution for Mexico City in the wake of the 2016 political reforms that convert Mexico City into a federative entity comparable to the 31 states; with "autonomy in all matters concerning its internal regime and its political and administrative organisation." It will be installed on September 15, 2016, and must create the new constitution by January 31, 2017.

The Constituent Assembly is based at the Casona de Xicoténcatl, the former home of the Senate of the Republic, under an agreement between the government of Mexico City and the Senate.

== Composition ==
The Constituent Assembly consists of 100 members, which were allocated as follows in the decree of political reform of Mexico City published on January 29, 2016, in the Diario Oficial de la Federación:

- 60 members, chosen in elections organised by the National Electoral Institute, using party list proportional representation
- 14 senators, selected by a two-thirds vote of the Senate of the Republic
- 14 deputies, selected by a two-thirds vote of the Chamber of Deputies
- 6 members designated by the president (Enrique Peña Nieto)
- 6 members designated by the Chief of the Government of the Federal District (Miguel Ángel Mancera)

=== Elected members ===
The elections for 60 of the 100 seats in the Constituent Assembly were held on June 5, 2016. The 100 members are as follows:

=== Senatorial designees ===
- Institutional Revolutionary Party (PRI)

- Raúl Cervantes Andrade
- María Lorena Marín Moreno (Note: Ana Lilia Herrera Anzaldo, the original choice, left the Senate to become the Secretary of Education of the State of Mexico.)
- Enrique Burgos García
- Lisbeth Hernández Lecona
- Joel Ayala Almeida
- Yolanda de la Torre Valdez

- National Action Party (PAN)

- Roberto Gil Zuarth
- Mariana Gómez del Campo
- Ernesto Cordero Arroyo
- Gabriela Cuevas Barrón
- Juan Carlos Romero Hicks (Note: The Labor Party declined to name one of its senators, as it disagreed with the creation of the list of senatorial designees. Romero Hicks of the PAN was selected instead.)

- Party of the Democratic Revolution (PRD)

- Dolores Padierna Luna
- Armando Ríos Piter

- Ecologist Green Party of Mexico (PVEM)

- Carlos Alberto Puente Salas (Note: Replaced Pablo Escudero Morales after he was designated President of the Senate.)

=== Deputy designees ===
- Institutional Revolutionary Party (PRI)

- María de La Paz Quiñones Cornejo
- Enrique Jackson
- María Esther de Jesús Scherman Leaño
- César Camacho Quiroz

- National Action Party (PAN)

- Federico Döring Casar
- María Guadalupe Cecilia Romero Castillo
- Santiago Taboada Cortina

- Party of the Democratic Revolution (PRD)

- Cecilia Guadalupe Soto González
- Jesús Salvador Valencia Guzmán

- Ecologist Green Party of Mexico (PVEM)

- Jesús Sesma Suárez

- Citizens' Movement (MC)

- René Cervera García

- New Alliance Party (PANAL)

- María Eugenia Ocampo Bedolla

- Social Encounter Party (PES)

- Hugo Eric Flores Cervantes

- Morena

- To be designated

=== Presidential designees ===
- Claudia Aguilar Barroso
- Manuel Enrique Díaz Infante
- Augusto Gómez Villanueva (President of the Constituent Assembly)
- Fernando Lerdo de Tejada
- María Beatriz Pagés Llergo Rebollar
- Claudia Pastor Bobadilla

=== Mayoral designees ===
- Olga Sánchez Cordero
- Claudia Jusidman
- Ana Laura Magaloni
- Alejandro Chanona
- Porfirio Muñoz Ledo
- Alejandro Encinas

=== Final composition ===
Party	Votes	%	Elected seats	Designees	Total seats
National Regeneration Movement	652,286	33.06	22	1	23
Party of the Democratic Revolution	572,043	28.99	19	10	29
National Action Party	203,843	10.3	7	8	15
Institutional Revolutionary Party	153,034	7.75	5	16	21
Social Encounter Party	68,639	3.47	2	1	3
New Alliance Party (Mexico)	55,178	2.79	2	1	3
Citizens' Movement	42,068	2.1	1	1	2
Ecologist Green Party of Mexico	30,477	1.54	1	2	3
Labor Party	18,348	0.93	0	0	0
Independent candidates	176,918	8.9	1	—	1
Invalid/blank votes	172,821	–	–	–	–
Total	2,145,655	100	60	–	100
Registered voters/turnout	–	28.67	–	–	–

The winning independent candidate — the only one of 21 to pass the 32,000-vote threshold — was Ismael Figueroa Flores.

Popular vote
MORENA	33.06%
PRD	28.99%
PAN	10.3%
PRI	7.75%
PES	3.47%
PANAL	2.79%
MC	2.1%
PVEM	1.54%
PT	0.93%
Independent	8.9%

Seats including designees
PRD	29%
MORENA	23%
PRI	21%
PAN	15%
PES	3%
PANAL	3%
PVEM	3%
MC	2%
Independent	1%

=== Party coordinators ===
- Bernardo Bátiz, Morena
- Santiago Creel, PAN
