= 26th federal electoral district of the Federal District =

Defunct federal electoral district of Mexico

Coordinates: 19.30°N 99.25°W

The 26th federal electoral district of the Federal District (Spanish: Distrito electoral federal 26 del Distrito Federal) is a defunct federal electoral district of Mexico. Occupying a portion of what is today Mexico City, it was in existence from 1973 to 2017.

During that time, it returned one deputy to the Chamber of Deputies for each three-year legislative session by means of the first-past-the-post system, electing its first in the 1973 mid-term election and its last in the 2015 mid-terms. From 1979 onwards, votes cast in the district also counted towards the calculation of proportional representation ("plurinominal") deputies elected from the country's electoral regions.

The 25th, 26th and 27th districts were abolished by the National Electoral Institute (INE) in its 2017 redistricting process because the capital's population no longer warranted that number of seats in Congress.

== District territory ==
Evolution of electoral district numbers
	1974	1978	1996	2005	2017	2023
Mexico City (Federal District)	27	40	30	27	24	22
Chamber of Deputies	196	300				

2005–2017

In its final form, when the capital accounted for 27 districts, the 26th was located in the south-west of the city. It covered the whole of the borough of Magdalena Contreras and the adjacent north-east portion of the borough of Álvaro Obregón.

1996–2005

Under the 1996 scheme, the capital comprised 30 districts. The 26th comprised the borough of Magdalena Contreras and the adjacent south-west portion of Álvaro Obregón.

1978–1996

The districting scheme in force from 1978 to 1996 was the result of the 1977 electoral reforms, which increased the number of single-member seats in the Chamber of Deputies from 196 to 300. Under that plan, the Federal District's seat allocation rose from 27 to 40. The 26th district covered a part of the borough of Iztapalapa in the east of the city.

== Deputies returned to Congress ==
(Mexico) National parties
- Current
- PAN
- PRI
- PT
- PVEM
- MC
- Morena
- Defunct or local only
- PLM
- PNR
- PRM
- PNM
- PP
- PPS
- PARM
- PFCRN
- Convergencia
- PANAL
- PSD
- PES
- PES
- PRD

Federal District's 26th district
Election	Deputy	Party	Term	Legislature
1973	Carlos Sansores Pérez	Institutional Revolutionary Party	1973–1976	49th Congress
1976	Humberto Serrano Pérez	Institutional Revolutionary Party	1976–1979	50th Congress
1979	Marcos Medina Ríos	Institutional Revolutionary Party	1979–1982	51st Congress
1982	Ignacio Cuauhtémoc Paleta	Institutional Revolutionary Party	1982–1985	52nd Congress
1985	Manuel Germán Parra Prado	Institutional Revolutionary Party	1985–1988	53rd Congress
1988	Jorge Schiaffino Isunza	Institutional Revolutionary Party	1988–1991	54th Congress
1991	Alberto Celis Velasco	Institutional Revolutionary Party	1991–1994	55th Congress
1994	Marco Antonio Michel Díaz	Institutional Revolutionary Party	1994–1997	56th Congress
1997	Demetrio Sodi de la Tijera	Party of the Democratic Revolution	1997–2000	57th Congress
2000	José Tomás Lozano Pardinas	National Action Party (Mexico)	2000–2003	58th Congress
2003	Agustín Rodríguez Fuentes	Party of the Democratic Revolution	2003–2006	59th Congress
2006	José Luis Gutiérrez Calzadilla	Party of the Democratic Revolution	2006–2009	60th Congress
2009	María de la Paz Quiñones Cornejo	National Action Party (Mexico)	2009–2012	61st Congress
2012	José Arturo López Cándido	Labour Party (Mexico)	2012–2015	62nd Congress
2015	María de la Paz Quiñones Cornejo	Institutional Revolutionary Party	2015–2018	63rd Congress
