= Cristina González =

Cristina González may refer to:

- Cristina González Cruz (born 1973), Mexican politician and lawyer
- Cristina González Ramos (born 1983), Spanish handballer
- Cristina González de Moreno, Colombian lawyer and model

== See also ==
- Cristina Gonzales (born 1976), Filipino former actress turned politician
