= Calzadilla (surname) =

Calzadilla is a Spanish surname. Notable people with the surname include:

- Carlos Calzadilla (born 2001), Venezuelan footballer
- Guillermo Calzadilla (born 1971), see Allora & Calzadilla, a collaborative duo of visual artists from San Juan, Puerto Rico
- Juan Calzadilla (1930–2025), Venezuelan poet, painter, and art critic
- Luis Calzadilla (born 2000), Mexican footballer
- Nelson Calzadilla (born 1954), Venezuelan Olympic boxer
- Román Calzadilla, Cuban baseball player, active from 1889 to 1902

== See also ==
- José Luis Gutiérrez Calzadilla (born 1944), Mexican politician
- Diogo Ortiz de Vilhegas, in Spanish Diego Ortiz de Calzadilla (died 1519), Castilian priest, theologian and astronomer
