= 39th federal electoral district of the State of Mexico =

Federal electoral district of Mexico

State of Mexico's 39th
- Electoral district of the Chamber of Deputies of Mexico

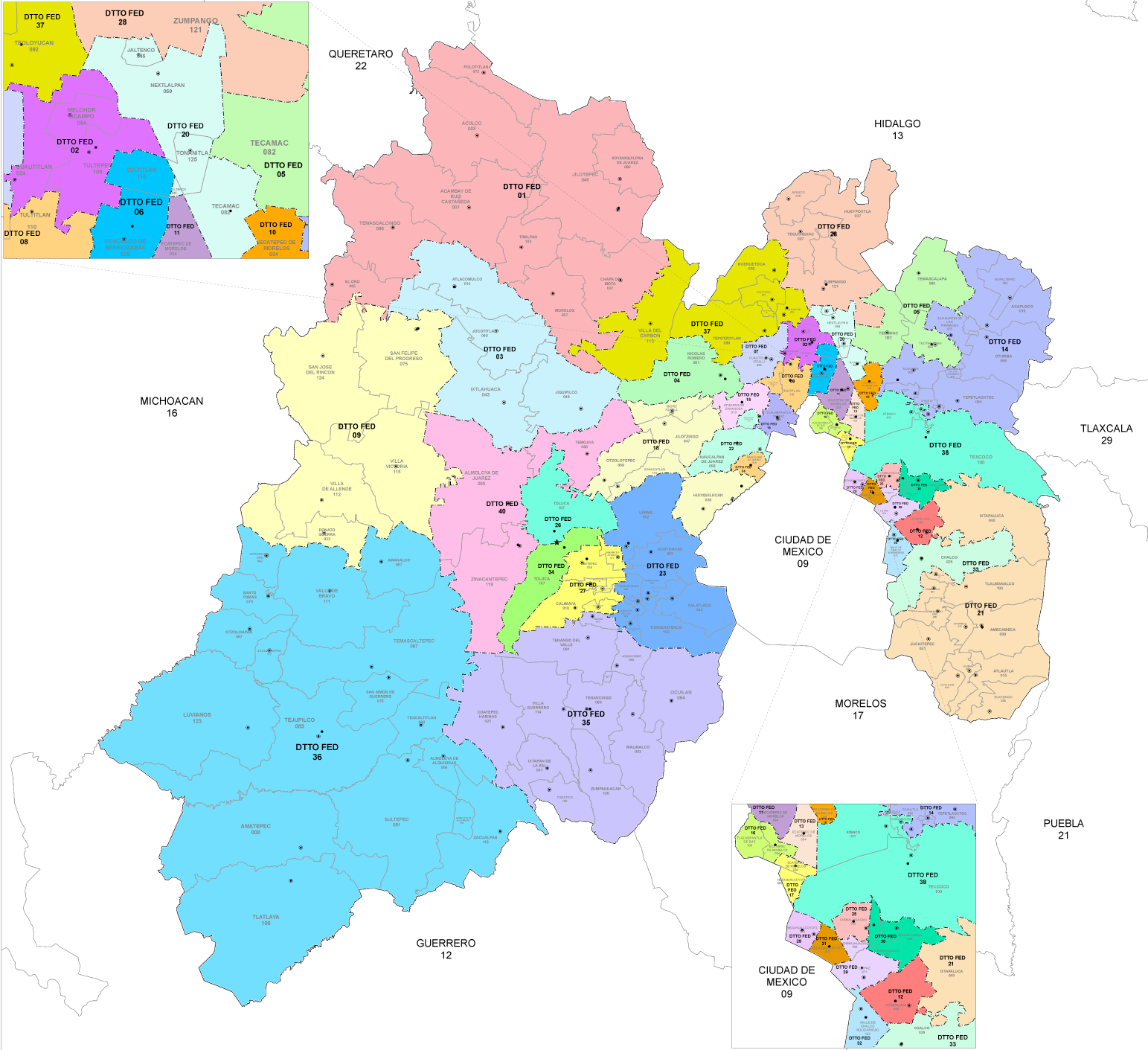
- State of Mexico's districts since 2023

Incumbent
- Member: José Luis Montalvo
- Party: ▌Labour Party
- Congress: 66th (2024–2027)

District
- State: State of Mexico
- Head town: Los Reyes Acaquilpan
- Coordinates: 19°21′N 98°58′W
- Covers: La Paz, Chimalhuacán (part)
- PR region: Fifth
- Precincts: 110
- Population: 407,702 (2020 census)

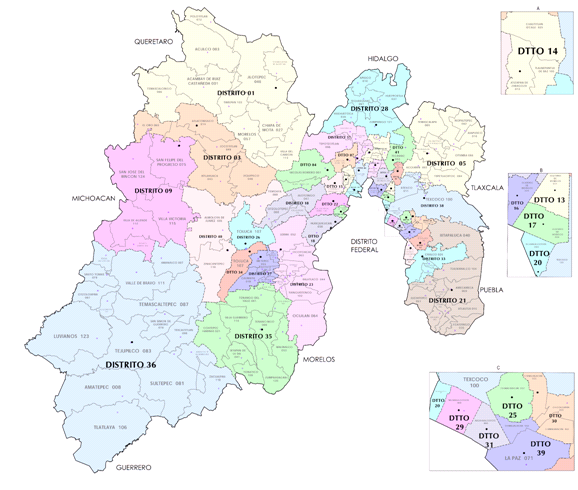
2017–2022 districting scheme

The 39th federal electoral district of the State of Mexico (Spanish: Distrito electoral federal 39 del Estado de México) is one of the 300 electoral districts into which Mexico is divided for elections to the federal Chamber of Deputies and one of 40 such districts in the State of Mexico.

It elects one deputy to the lower house of Congress for each three-year legislative session by means of the first-past-the-post system. Votes cast in the district also count towards the calculation of proportional representation ("plurinominal") deputies elected from the fifth region.

The 37th to 40th districts were created by the Federal Electoral Institute (IFE) in its 2005 redistricting process and were first contested in the 2006 general election.

The current member for the district, elected in the 2024 general election, is José Luis Montalvo Luna of the Labour Party (PT).

== District territory ==
Under the 2023 districting plan adopted by the National Electoral Institute (INE), which is to be used for the 2024, 2027 and 2030 federal elections, the 39th district is located in the state's eastern panhandle, within the Greater Mexico City area, and covers 110 electoral precincts (secciones electorales) across two of its 125 municipalities:

- La Paz and the southern portion of Chimalhuacán. (Note: Districts 25 and 30 cover the remainder of Chimalhuacán.)

The head town (cabecera distrital), where results from individual polling stations are gathered together and tallied, is the city of Los Reyes Acaquilpan. In the 2020 census, the district reported a total population of 407,702.

== Previous districting schemes ==
Evolution of electoral district numbers
	1974	1978	1996	2005	2017	2023
State of Mexico	15	34	36	40	41	40
Chamber of Deputies	196	300				

Under the previous districting plans enacted by the INE and its predecessors, the 39th district was situated as follows:

2017–2022

The municipalities of Chimalhuacán and La Paz. The head town was at Los Reyes Acaquilpan.

2005–2017

The municipalities of Chicoloapan and La Paz. The head town was at Los Reyes Acaquilpan.

== Deputies returned to Congress ==
(Mexico) National parties
- Current
- PAN
- PRI
- PT
- PVEM
- MC
- Morena
- PAZ
- Somos
- Defunct or local only
- PLM
- PNR
- PRM
- PNM
- PP
- PPS
- PARM
- PFCRN
- CON
- PANAL
- PSD
- PES
- PES
- PRD

State of Mexico's 39th district
Election	Deputy	Party	Term	Legislature
2006	Juan Manuel San Martín Hernández	Party of the Democratic Revolution	2006–2009	60th Congress
2009	Andrés Aguirre Romero	Institutional Revolutionary Party	2009–2012	61st Congress
2012	Cristina González Cruz	Institutional Revolutionary Party	2012–2015	62nd Congress
2015	Andrés Aguirre Romero	Institutional Revolutionary Party	2015–2018	63rd Congress
2018	José Luis Montalvo Luna	Labour Party (Mexico)	2018–2021	64th Congress
2021	Alan Castellanos Ramírez	Institutional Revolutionary Party	2021–2024	65th Congress
2024	José Luis Montalvo Luna	Labour Party (Mexico)	2024–2027	66th Congress

== Presidential elections ==
State of Mexico's 39th district
Election	District won by	Party or coalition	%
2018	Andrés Manuel López Obrador	Juntos Haremos Historia	59.4723
2024	Claudia Sheinbaum Pardo	Sigamos Haciendo Historia	66.4561
