= 2nd federal electoral district of the State of Mexico =

Federal electoral district of Mexico

State of Mexico's 2nd
- Electoral district of the Chamber of Deputies of Mexico

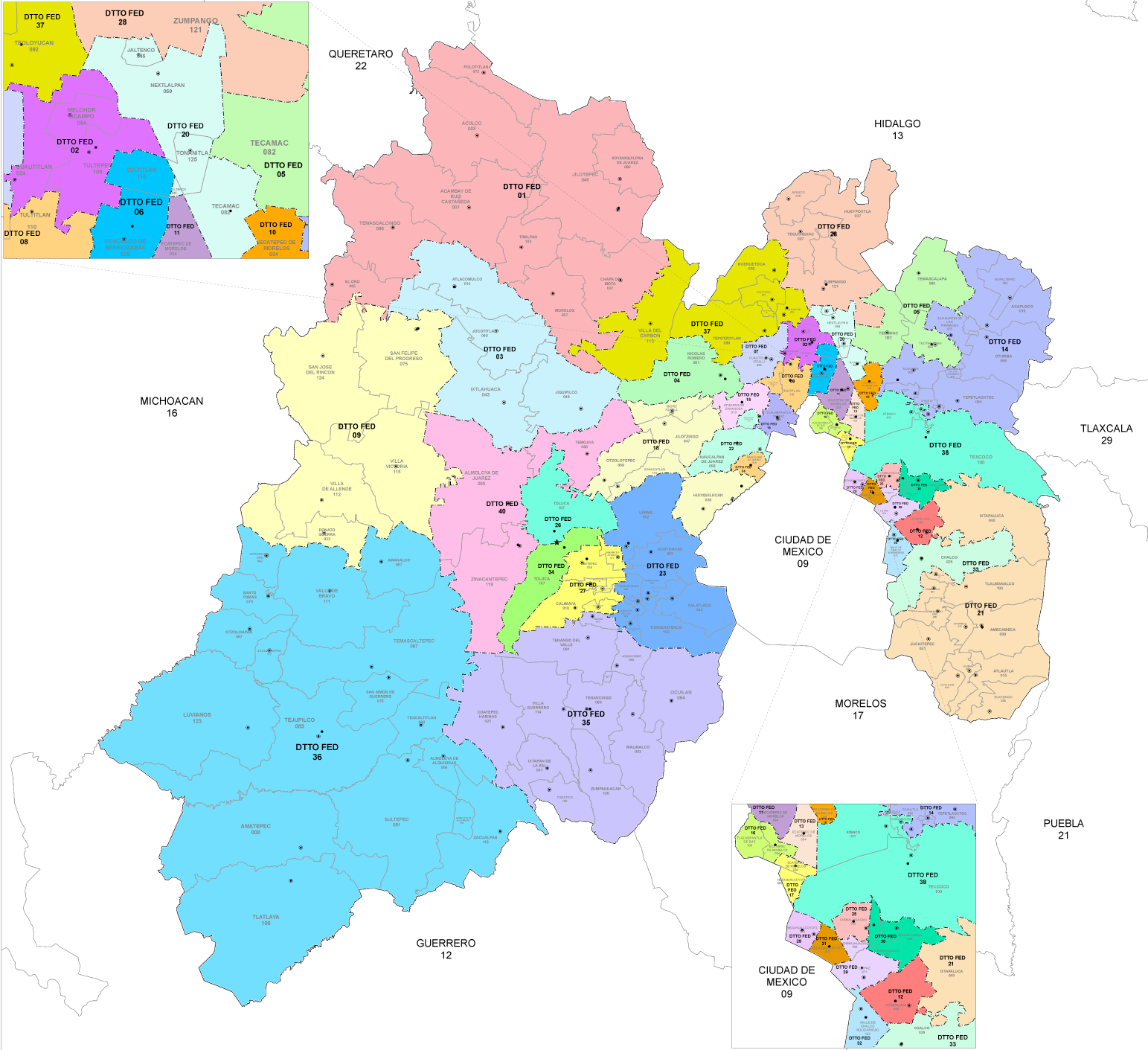
- State of Mexico's districts since 2023

Incumbent
- Member: Dionicia Vázquez García
- Party: ▌Morena
- Congress: 66th (2024–2027)

District
- State: State of Mexico
- Head town: Santa María Tultepec
- Coordinates: 19°41′N 99°07′W
- Covers: Cuautitlán, Melchor Ocampo, Tultepec
- PR region: Fifth
- Precincts: 83
- Population: 387,623 (2020 census)

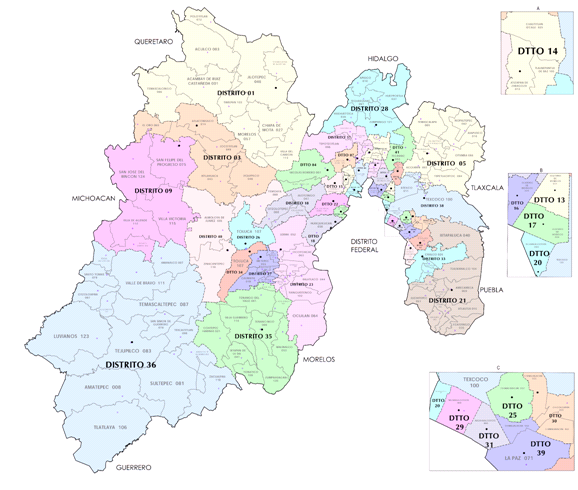
2017-2022 districting scheme

The 2nd federal electoral district of the State of Mexico (Spanish: Distrito electoral federal 02 del Estado de México) is one of the 300 electoral districts into which Mexico is divided for elections to the federal Chamber of Deputies and one of 40 such districts in the State of Mexico.

It elects one deputy to the lower house of Congress for each three-year legislative session by means of the first-past-the-post system. Votes cast in the district also count towards the calculation of proportional representation ("plurinominal") deputies elected from the fifth region.

The current member for the district, re-elected in the 2024 general election, is Dionicia Vázquez García. Originally elected for the Labour Party (PT), she switched allegiance to the National Regeneration Movement (Morena) on 19 September 2024.

== District territory ==
Under the 2023 districting plan adopted by the National Electoral Institute (INE), which is to be used for the 2024, 2027 and 2030 federal elections, the 2nd district covers 83 electoral precincts (secciones electorales) across three municipalities in the northern part of the Greater Mexico City urban area:

- Cuautitlán, Melchor Ocampo and Tultepec.

The head town (cabecera distrital), where results from individual polling stations are gathered together and tallied, is the city of Santa María Tultepec. The district reported a population of 387,623 in the 2020 census.

== Previous districting schemes ==
Evolution of electoral district numbers
	1974	1978	1996	2005	2017	2023
State of Mexico	15	34	36	40	41	40
Chamber of Deputies	196	300				

Under the previous districting plans enacted by the INE and its predecessors, the 2nd district was situated as follows:

2017–2022

Covering the municipalities of Jaltenco, Nextlalpan, Tultepec, Tultitlán and Tonanitla. The head town was at Tultepec.

2005–2017

Covering the municipalities of Apaxco, Coyotepec, Huehuetoca, Teoloyucan, Tepotzotlán, Tequixquiac and Villa del Carbón. The head town was at Teoloyucan.

1996–2005

Covering the municipalities of Apaxco, Coyotepec, Huehuetoca, Hueypoxtla, Jaltenco, Nextlalpan, Teoloyucan, Tequixquiac Tonatitla and Zumpango. The head town was at Zumpango.

1978–1996

The municipalities of Almoloya de Juárez, Amanalco, Donato Guerra, Ixtapan del Oro, San Felipe del Progreso, Santo Tomás, Temascaltepec, Valle de Bravo, Villa de Allende and Villa Victoria, with its head town at Valle de Bravo.

== Deputies returned to Congress ==
(Mexico) National parties
- Current
- PAN
- PRI
- PT
- PVEM
- MC
- Morena
- PAZ
- Somos
- Defunct or local only
- PLM
- PNR
- PRM
- PNM
- PP
- PPS
- PARM
- PFCRN
- CON
- PANAL
- PSD
- PES
- PES
- PRD

State of Mexico's 2nd district
Election	Deputy	Party	Term	Legislature
1916	Fernando Moreno		1916–1917	Constituent Congress of Querétaro
...
1979	Armando Neyra Chávez	Institutional Revolutionary Party	1979–1982	51st Congress
1982	Gerardo Cavazos Cortés	Institutional Revolutionary Party	1982–1985	52nd Congress
1985	Eduardo Lecanda Lujambio	Institutional Revolutionary Party	1985–1988	53rd Congress
1988	Héctor Jarquín Hernández	Institutional Revolutionary Party	1988–1991	54th Congress
1991	Eduardo Lencanda Lujambio	Institutional Revolutionary Party	1991–1994	55th Congress
1994	Juan Maldonado Sánchez	Institutional Revolutionary Party	1994–1997	56th Congress
1997	Enrique Santillán Viveros	Party of the Democratic Revolution	1997–2000	57th Congress
2000	Gustavo Alonso Donis García	Institutional Revolutionary Party	2000–2003	58th Congress
2003	Fernando García Cuevas	Institutional Revolutionary Party	2003–2006	59th Congress
2006	Juan Abad de Jesús	Citizens' Movement (Mexico)	2006–2009	60th Congress
2009	Raúl Domínguez Rex	Institutional Revolutionary Party	2009–2012	61st Congress
2012	Gerardo Liceaga Arteaga	Institutional Revolutionary Party	2012–2015	62nd Congress
2015	Raúl Domínguez Rex	Institutional Revolutionary Party	2015–2018	63rd Congress
2018	Dionicia Vázquez García	Labour Party (Mexico)	2018–2021	64th Congress
2021	Dionicia Vázquez García	Labour Party (Mexico)	2021–2024	65th Congress
2024	Dionicia Vázquez García (Note: Originally elected for the Labour Party, Vázquez García was one of three deputies who switched to Morena on 19 September 2024.)	Labour Party (Mexico) National Regeneration Movement	2024–2027	66th Congress

== Presidential elections ==
State of Mexico's 2nd district
Election	District won by	Party or coalition	%
2018	Andrés Manuel López Obrador	Juntos Haremos Historia	60.5495
2024	Claudia Sheinbaum Pardo	Sigamos Haciendo Historia	65.3494
