= Raúl Domínguez Rex =

Mexican politician (born 1970)

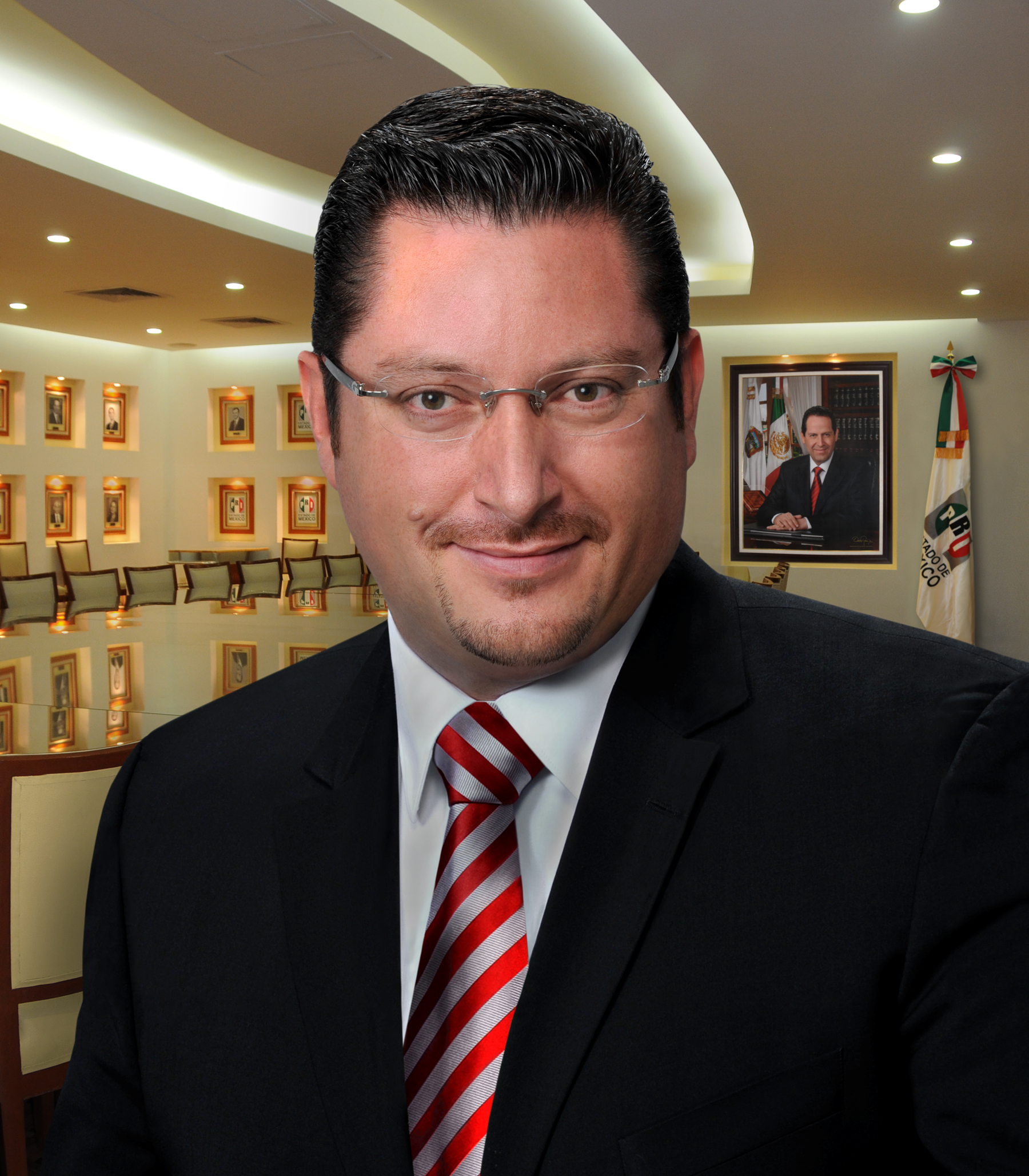

Member of the Chamber of Deputies for the State of Mexico's 2nd district
- In office 1 September 2015 – 18 September 2017
- Preceded by: Gerardo Liceaga Arteaga
- Succeeded by: Aarón González Rojas
- In office 1 September 2009 – 31 August 2012
- Preceded by: Juan Abad de Jesús
- Succeeded by: Gerardo Liceaga Arteaga

Personal details
- Born: 20 September 1970 (age 55) Mexico City, Mexico
- Party: PRI
- Occupation: Politician

Raúl Domínguez Rex (born 20 September 1970) is a Mexican politician from the Institutional Revolutionary Party (PRI). He served as a deputy representing the second district of the State of Mexico in the 61st and 63rd sessions of Congress.

== Life ==
Domínguez Rex's political career began in the Confederation of Workers and Farmers (CTC), of which he became a secretary general in 1992. After graduating with a law degree from the UAEM University Center at Cuautitlán Izcalli, he served twice on the city council of Naucalpan, from 1994 to 1996 and again from 2000 to 2003. In the early 2000s, Domínguez Rex obtained a master's degree in public administration from the Universidad Anáhuac.

Between 2003 and 2006, Domínguez Rex advised a federal deputy; from there, he was elected as a local deputy to the LVI Legislature of the Congress of the State of Mexico. In his three years in Toluca, he presided over the Civil Protection Commission. Immediately after that, voters sent him to San Lázaro for the LXI Legislature of the Mexican Congress; he was a secretary on the Government Commission and also sat on the Foreign Relations Commission.

His years of legislative service also coincided with other developments. Domínguez Rex attended various political seminars, became a member of Woodlands Constructora y Comercializadora, S.A. de C.V., in 2008, and began serving as a PRI councilor. Most notably, between October 2011 and June 17, 2014, he headed the PRI in the State of Mexico, maintaining an unusually low profile for the position. During this time period, he coordinated the PRI's 2012 presidential campaign in the state, whose former governor Enrique Peña Nieto was running for president, and he also coordinated local campaigns. His resignation from the state party's top position occurred two and a half years into a four-year term.

Just days after resigning from the state PRI, governor Eruviel Ávila appointed Domínguez Rex as the state secretary for metropolitan development, a position he remained in until 2015. That June, voters returned Domínguez Rex to the Chamber of Deputies, this time in its LXIII Legislature. He presides over the Commission for Urban Development and Land Use and serves on three other commissions, including Transportation and Metropolitan Development.
