= Andrés Aguirre Romero =

Mexican politician

- Born: 26 August 1972 (age 53); State of Mexico, Mexico
- Occupation: Politician
- Political party: PRI

Andrés Aguirre Romero (born 26 August 1972) is a Mexican politician from the Institutional Revolutionary Party (PRI). He has served two terms in the Chamber of Deputies for the State of Mexico's 39th district.

== Life ==
After graduating with a law degree from the National Autonomous University of Mexico (UNAM) and two diplomas in political marketing, Aguirre Romero got his start as a private secretary to the municipal president of Chicoloapan from 1997 to 2000. After spending two years as an administrative delegate in the Mexican State Youth Institute, Aguirre went on to work in PRI positions as well as a stakeholder in Consultores Mexicanos en Proyectos de Ingeniería, S.C. He was a coordinating secretary for the Confederación Nacional de Organizaciones Populares in the State of Mexico, and in 2007, he was named the PRI's municipal party president in Chicoloapan.

From 2009 to 2012, Aguirre served in his first term in the Chamber of Deputies in the 61st Congress. He served on four commissions: Environment and Natural Resources, Federal District, Youth and Sports, and a special commission related to the country's bicentennial.

In 2012, voters elected Aguirre Romero to the municipal presidency of Chicoloapan, a position he filled between 2013 and 2015. He resigned from that position in order to return to the Chamber of Deputies for the 63rd Congress, representing the 39th district centered on Los Reyes Acaquilpan. He served on the Environment and Natural Resources, Drinking Water and Sanitation, and Competitiveness Commissions.
