= Julio Saldaña Morán =

Mexican politician

- Born: 27 August 1961 (age 64); Veracruz, Veracruz, Mexico
- Occupation: Politician
- Political party: PRD

Julio Saldaña Morán (born 27 August 1961) is a Mexican politician from the Party of the Democratic Revolution (PRD). He represented Veracruz and the third electoral region in the Chamber of Deputies for the 63rd session of Congress (2015–2018).

== Life ==
Saldaña's political career began in the National Action Party (PAN), where he was a poll observer in 1988 and a general representative in 1994. He also was involved with local positions in the Veracruz city government, particularly on ecological matters and parks, and was a town councilor there from 1997 to 2000 and its secretary of government from 2001 to 2004. In 2001, Saldaña obtained a law degree from the Centro de Estudios Superiores México.

Saldaña continued to serve an important role in local politics; he was the PAN's presidential campaign coordinator for the port of Veracruz in 2000 and again in 2006, and in 2005, voters elected him to the 60th session of the Congress of Veracruz. In that legislature, he presided over the Public Security and Justice Commission.

In 2007 and 2010, Saldaña was the PAN's candidate for the municipal presidency of Veracruz, Veracruz, losing each time. In 2009, however, Saldaña did win a plurinominal seat in the federal Chamber of Deputies for the 61st Congress; he was the secretary of the Rural Development Commission and sat on those dealing with Government and Navy.

In 2013, after finding that it had no suitable internal candidates to run for municipal president, the Party of the Democratic Revolution tapped Saldaña as its candidate; he would lose in the election. While the state president of the PRD said it was not necessary for Saldaña to leave the PAN, and Saldaña even stated he was not leaving the party, the PAN began the process of expelling Saldaña and dozens of his supporters from the party in mid-July. Ultimately, by the end of the year, Saldaña formally joined the PRD.

In 2015, Saldaña Morán was placed on the PRD's list of proportional representation deputies from the third region, returning him to the Chamber of Deputies for the 63rd Congress. He sat on the Energy, Labor and Social Welfare, and Metropolitan Development Commissions.
