= Gustavo Donis García =

Mexican politician

- Born: 7 November 1962 (age 63); Mexico City, Mexico
- Occupation: Politician
- Political party: PRI

Gustavo Alonso Donis García (born 7 November 1962) is a Mexican politician from the Institutional Revolutionary Party. From 2000 to 2003 he served in the Chamber of Deputies during the 58th Congress, representing the State of Mexico's 2nd district. He was municipal president of Tequixquiac between 2003 and 2006.

== Biography ==
Gustavo Donis born in Mexico City, he is alone son of Gustavos's mother. He arrived to Tequixquiac when he was a child with Socorro Garcia, his mother.

== Political beginnings ==
From the 1950s Tequixquiac has evolved into the poorly planned urbanization; nevertheless, it has the services needed for development without losing their provincial values. The cause is speculation the authorities of the state government of Mexico on the ground tequixquense prompted former Governor Arturo Montiel through the company Wilk SA. Despite what makes the Act was repealed the proposal to create urban development plan because of high speculation was generated by the corruption of the PAN and PRI mayors before state authorities, public or became public consultations to see what the positions and demands of the inhabitants of the municipality themselves were, but was rather a plan made in a private office with interests PRI militants and PAN claiming to be landowners within ejido land to partner with developers of housing units, as happened with Huehuetoca or Zumpango de Ocampo who were recently enacted Bicentennial cities (Ciudades Bicentenario).
