= Juan Manuel San Martín Hernández =

Mexican politician

- Born: 16 December 1961 (age 64); State of Mexico, Mexico
- Occupation: Politician
- Political party: PRD

Juan Manuel San Martín Hernández (born 16 December 1961) is a Mexican politician affiliated with the Party of the Democratic Revolution (PRD). In the 2006 general election he was elected to the Chamber of Deputies to represent the State of Mexico's 39th district during the 60th session of Congress.
