= Lorena Corona Valdés =

Mexican politician

- Born: 16 December 1972 (age 53); Durango, Mexico
- Occupation: Politician
- Political party: PVEM

Lorena Corona Valdés (born 16 December 1972) is a Mexican politician from the Ecologist Green Party of Mexico. She serves as a federal deputy to the LXIII Legislature of the Mexican Congress representing Durango and the first electoral region.

== Life ==
Corona received her law degree from the Instituto Tecnológico Autónomo de México (ITAM) in 1997 and worked primarily as a communications lawyer. Between 2001 and 2006, she was the legal director of Televisa Radio (Sistema Radiópolis, S.A. de C.V.); during this time, she obtained graduate degrees in intellectual property law and in operating broadcasting companies, and she was also named by Vicente Fox to serve on the Federal Telecommunications Commission. After she left Televisa Radio, she worked at Ecija Abogados from 2006 to 2007 and at Legal Media Advisers from 2007 to 2008.

From 2009 to 2012, Corona spent her first term in the Chamber of Deputies for the LXI Legislature, where she sat on the Public Education and Educational Services Commission as well as those dealing with Government and National Defense. She returned to the chamber in 2015, again as a proportional representation deputy; she sits on the Economy, Constitutional Points, and Culture and Film Commissions.
