= Maribel Alva Olvera =

Mexican politician

- Born: 19 August 1963 (age 62); State of Mexico, Mexico
- Occupation: Politician
- Political party: PRD

Maribel Luisa Alva Olvera (Note: In this Mexican name, the surname is Alva and the second or maternal family name is Olvera.) (born 19 August 1963) is a Mexican politician affiliated with the Party of the Democratic Revolution (PRD).

In the 2006 general election she was elected to the Chamber of Deputies to represent the State of Mexico's 13th district during the 60th session of Congress.
