= Jesús Sesma Suárez =

Mexican politician (born 1978)

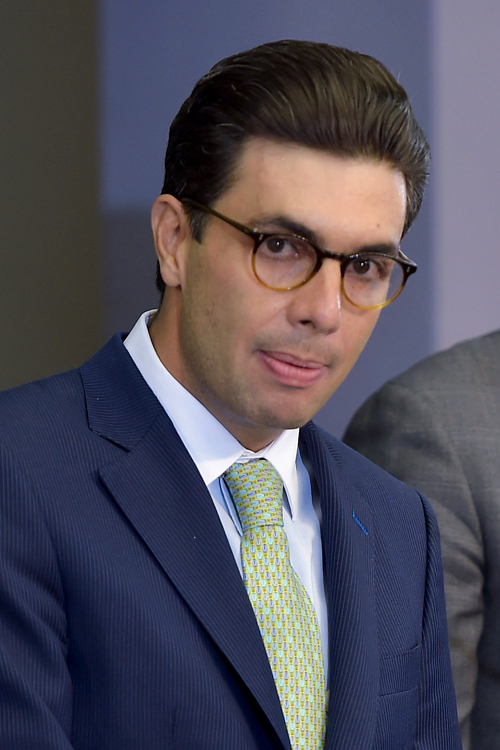
- 2017
- Born: 3 September 1978 (age 47)
- Occupation: Politician
- Political party: Ecologist Green Party of Mexico

Jesús Sesma Suárez (born 3 September 1978) is a Mexican politician from the Ecologist Green Party of Mexico. He represents Jalisco as a federal deputy from the first electoral region to the LXIII Legislature of the Mexican Congress.

== Life ==
Sesma Suárez obtained his undergraduate law degree from the Universidad del Valle de México and his master's degree in economics from the UNAM; he worked at the law firm of Sesma, Sesma and McNesse. His career in PVEM politics began in 2001, when he began a three-year stint as the PVEM's Director of Institutional Relations. In 2005, he became the national PVEM's Secretary of Social Communication, a post he would hold through 2008.

In 2006, Sesma Suárez was elected as an alternate deputy to the LX Legislature of the Mexican Congress for Sara Isabel Castellanos Cortés, representing San Luis Potosí from the second region. Castellanos permanently left the Chamber of Deputies effective April 26, 2007, prompting Sesma to be sworn in as a new federal deputy. In a two-year span, he served on seven commissions, including Economy; Special on the National Rural Accord and the Agriculture Chapter of the Free Trade Agreement; Foreign Relations; Government; Agriculture and Ranching; Culture; and Human Rights.

Sesma returned to a legislature in 2012, this time as a local deputy to the VI Legislature of the Legislative Assembly of the Federal District. He was the PVEM parliamentary coordinator and presided over the Environmental Preservation, Ecological Protection and Climate Change Commission, in addition to serving on others dealing with the justice system, health and political reform. While a deputy, circus leaders slammed him for being a hypocrite; while he promoted measures that prohibited the use of animals in circuses, his wife posed for a photo shoot featuring mounted animals and fur coats.

In 2015, Sesma Suárez was returned to the federal Chamber of Deputies, this time for the LXIII Legislature from Jalisco in the first region. He is the PVEM parliamentary coordinator and sits on the Political Coordination Board, as well as on the Jurisdictional, Rules and Parliamentary Practices, and Constitutional Points Commissions.

Additionally, Sesma is a backup representative of the PVEM's legislative delegation to the General Council of the National Electoral Institute and has been tapped by the Chamber of Deputies as one of its designees to the Constituent Assembly of Mexico City.
