= Juan Abad de Jesús =

Mexican politician (born 1965)

Member of the Chamber of Deputies for the State of Mexico's 2nd district
- In office 1 September 2006 – 31 August 2009
- Preceded by: Fernando García Cuevas
- Succeeded by: Raúl Domínguez Rex

Personal details
- Born: 13 February 1965 (age 61) Coyotepec, State of Mexico, Mexico
- Party: PAN (1990s–2000); MC (2000–present)
- Occupation: Politician

Juan Abad de Jesús (born 13 February 1965) is a Mexican politician affiliated with the Citizens' Movement (formerly to the National Action Party). In the 2006 general election he was elected to the Chamber of Deputies to represent the State of Mexico's second district. Previously, he was Mayor of Coyotepec from 1997 to 2000 and from 2003 to 2006.
