= José Alfredo Torres Huitrón =

Mexican politician

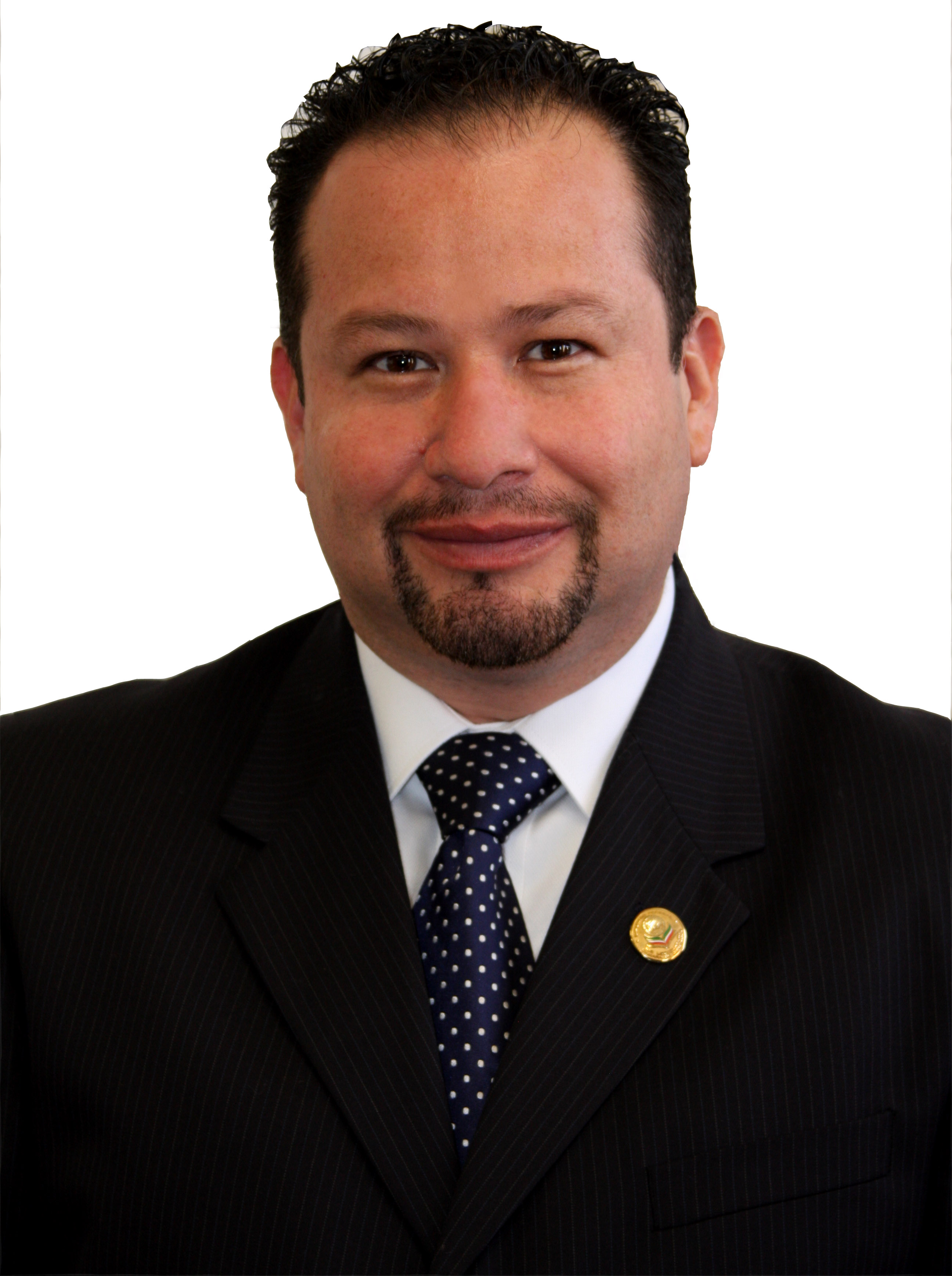
- Born: 12 December 1973 (age 52); Ecatepec de Morelos, State of Mexico, Mexico
- Occupation: Politician
- Political party: Institutional Revolutionary Party

José Alfredo Torres Huitrón (born 12 December 1973) is a Mexican politician from the Institutional Revolutionary Party (PRI). He served as a federal deputy to the LXIII Legislature of the Mexican Congress representing the 13th district of the State of Mexico.

== Life ==
Torres Huitrón's political career began in the late 1980s when he served as an office chief in the Water and Sewer Department of the municipality of Ecatepec de Morelos. Six years later, he would serve as an advisor to the head of the DIF in that municipality. Around this time, he also obtained his undergraduate degree in business administration from the Anáhuac Valley University Center, El Oro Campus, and in 1990, he became involved as a community manager with the political organization Coordinadora Río de Luz, A.C.

In the late 1990s and early 2000s, he served once more in municipal positions, as an advisor to the department of public security and municipal transit in another city in the State of Mexico, Coacalco, and from 2000 to 2003 on the town council of Ecatepec; he followed that term up with a three-year stint as advisor to the municipal president. The mid-2000s were also marked with a flurry of PRI activity; he served as a district-level coordinator for proportional representation seats, an activist in the Confederación Nacional de Organizaciones Populares, a representative of the CNOP before the PRI's state Internal Processes Commission, as a state- and national-level councilor, and as a state-level secretary of the Urban Neighborhoods Movement of the PRI.

=== Legislative career ===
2009 marked the beginning of Torres Huitrón's first term in San Lázaro. In the LXI Legislature, he served on the Environment and Natural Resources and Justice Commissions. During his first term in the Chamber of Deputies, in 2010, he graduated with a master's degree in university teaching from the Universidad Tolteca de México.

When that term ended, he was elected as a local deputy to the LVIII Legislature of the Congress of the State of Mexico, where he served on eight commissions including Work and Social Welfare and Security, Borders of the State of Mexico and its Municipalities, Justice, Environmental Protection, and Metropolitan Matters.

Voters in Ecatepec returned Torres to the Chamber of Deputies for the LXIII Legislature in 2015. He is a secretary on the Commission for Care of Vulnerable Groups and sits on two others: Cooperative Promotion and Social Economy, and Housing.

== Personal ==
Torres Huitrón's father, José Alfredo Torres Martínez, is the current Secretary of Urban Development in the State of Mexico. He was the municipal president of Ecatepec between 1994 and 1996 and also served as a local deputy.
