= María Isabel Maya Pineda =

Mexican politician

- Born: 2 March 1969 (age 57); Ecatepec de Morelos, State of Mexico, Mexico
- Occupation: Politician
- Political party: Institutional Revolutionary Party

María Isabel Maya Pineda (born 2 March 1969) is a Mexican politician affiliated with the Institutional Revolutionary Party (PRI). She was a federal deputy in the LXIII Legislature of the Mexican Congress, representing the State of Mexico's 16th district.

== Life ==
Maya Pineda, who holds a degree in economics from the UNAM, began her public service career in 1993 as an auditor in the municipality of Ecatepec. Her political career, however, began in the National Action Party, of which she was an active member until 2001. She served as a campaign coordinator for a PAN federal deputy campaign in 1991 and 1997, as a district-level campaign coordinator in the 1994 elections, and on the PAN campaign team for the 1996 municipal elections in Ecatepec. She also was a candidate for alternate federal deputy in 1997. Her break with the party came in 2001, when she and several other legislators broke ranks with state party leader Francisco Gárate Chapa, initially becoming an independent.

She was a local deputy to the LIV Legislature of the Congress of the State of Mexico between 2000 and 2003, when she left the chamber to run for and win a seat on the city council of Ecatepec under a PRI banner in which future Governor Eruviel Ávila was the mayoral candidate. The PRI then designated her as candidate for federal deputy to the LIX Legislature of the Mexican Congress from the 13th district, and she won in a race where turnout plunged to 30 percent in some areas; she had thus been elected to two public offices in under 120 days, and three over a period of three years. In her first term in San Lázaro, between 2003 and 2006, she sat on the Commission for Care of Vulnerable Groups, as well as the Youth and Sports Commission.

In 2006, she began serving on a foundation, ISAMAY para la Gestión Social A.C., which she presided for eight years.

Her career in the PRI flared up again in the early 2010s, serving as a local and regional delegate, and for the 2011 gubernatorial elections in the State of Mexico, she served as a regional coordinator of public relations.

Voters in the 16th district, which includes parts of Ecatepec, sent Maya Pineda back to the Chamber of Deputies for the LXIII Legislature in 2015. She serves on commissions for Human Rights, Care for Vulnerable Groups, and Strengthening of Federalism.
