= Armando Ríos Piter =

Mexican politician

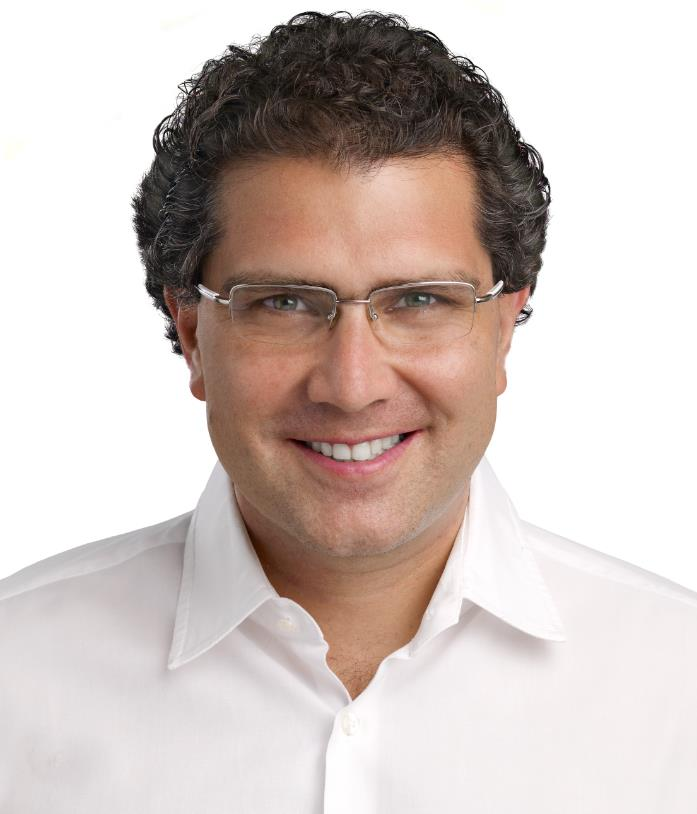
- Armando Ríos Piter in 2012
- Born: 21 February 1973 (age 53); Tecpan de Galeana, Guerrero, Mexico
- Occupation: Senator
- Political party: Democratic Revolution (2007–2017); Independent (2017–present)

Armando Ríos Piter (born 21 February 1973) is a Mexican politician who served in the Senate during the 63rd and 64th sessions of Congress, representing Guerrero for the Party of the Democratic Revolution (PRD); while a senator, he became an independent and briefly pursued an independent presidential campaign. He also served in the Chamber of Deputies during the 61st Congress, representing Guerrero's third district.

== Life ==
Ríos Piter was born in Tecpan de Galeana, Guerrero, but obtained his education in Mexico City, concurrently obtaining an economics degree from the Instituto Tecnológico Autónomo de México (ITAM) and a law degree from the Universidad Nacional Autónoma de México (UNAM). His first public job was in the workers' housing fund INFONAVIT and, a year later, he moved over to the Secretariat of Finance and Public Credit (SHCP).

== Political career ==
In 2000, Ríos Piter entered state government for the first time when he became the deputy secretary for political matters in the government of the state of Guerrero, though he soon left the post in order to work toward a master's degree in national security awarded by Georgetown University. In 2003, he returned to Guerrero and became the deputy secretary of agricultural policy in the federal government at the Secretariat of Agrarian Reform (SRA). Two years later, upon the election of a new governor in Guerrero, he returned to Chilpancingo to serve as the state secretary of rural development. Additionally, he joined the Party of the Democratic Revolution (PRD) in 2007.

=== Legislative history ===
In the 2009 mid-terms, Ríos Piter was elected to the Chamber of Deputies for the 61st Congress; his district, Guerrero's 3rd, was the only win for the PRD in the state that year. He was one of the PRD's leaders in the chamber during that session, serving as the head of the PRD caucus in the chamber and also presiding over the Political Coordination Board and the Finance and Public Credit Commission. His commission assignments reflected his educational and government background, ranging from ranching to budget analysis.

With his three-year term up, the PRD successfully ran Ríos Piter for the Senate, for a six-year term to cover the 62nd and 63rd Congresses in the 2012 general election. He sat on six regular committees—as secretary on four of them—in the 62nd session, and in the 63rd session, he chaired the Population and Development Commission while sitting on others related to public finances, corruption, and radio, television and film, among others. During his tenure, he mounted a bid to be the PRD gubernatorial candidate in 2015 in Guerrero, but he declined over his outrage that Jesús Ortega Martínez, part of another faction of the PRD known as "Los Chuchos", obliged him to sign a political pact with disgraced governor Ángel Aguirre Rivero to be the candidate. The Senate also named Ríos Piter as one of its designees to the Constituent Assembly of Mexico City, but his nomination failed to receive enough votes in the Senate.

In September 2016, Ríos Piter proposed legislation that would protect Mexicans should Donald Trump, as US president, inflict punishment on the country in order to fund the proposed border wall. He stressed that the economic welfare of the United States and Mexico was at stake. "At a time like this, it's vital for us to understand why this relationship benefits both. We're neighbors, we're friends, we're partners," he said. "He's putting (that) at risk."

=== Departure from the PRD and independent presidential candidacy ===
On 14 February 2017, Ríos Piter announced he would leave the PRD to start a nonpartisan movement called the Movimiento Jaguar (Jaguar Movement). His departure brought the number of defections from the PRD among the senators it had elected in 2012 to eight. By leaving the PRD, he declared he had resigned from "an entire system that now only produces noise and confrontation" and not just from the party.

Three months later, he announced his intention to run for president in 2018 as an independent candidate. By early February 2018, he had submitted 1,765,599 signatures, enough to meet the required 866,593—one percent of the electoral rolls in at least 17 of Mexico's 32 states—to appear on the 2018 presidential ballot as an independent, becoming the second candidate to do so behind Jaime Rodríguez Calderón. However, only 242,646 of them were deemed valid by the National Electoral Institute, with the rest being rejected due to irregularities, meaning Ríos Piter did not reach the required number of valid signatures to appear on the ballot.

Ríos Piter also made calls to clear the political field, including Rodríguez Calderón and Margarita Zavala, and join forces to create a unified, independent presidential campaign. According to Ríos Piter, the goal of such a combined candidacy would be to create a common platform "to confront the political parties and their candidates, who must be sent to rehabilitation."
