= José Arturo López Cándido =

Mexican politician

- Born: 20 December 1952 (age 73); Coyoacán, Mexico City, Mexico
- Occupation: Deputy
- Political party: PT (1970s–2014); Morena (2014–present)

José Arturo López Cándido (born 20 December 1952) is a Mexican politician affiliated with the National Regeneration Movement (Morena) who formerly belonged to the Labor Party (PT). In the 2012 general election he was elected to the Chamber of Deputies to represent the Federal District's 26th electoral district for the PT.
