= Baltazar Martínez Montemayor =

Mexican politician (born 1966)

- Born: 31 August 1966 (age 60); Cerralvo, Nuevo León, Mexico
- Education: Autonomous University of Nuevo León
- Occupation: Politician
- Political party: PAN
- Spouse: Gloria Elizabeth Rios Pruneda
- Children: 3

Baltazar Martínez Montemayor (born August 31, 1966) is a Mexican politician from the National Action Party. He serves as a federal deputy of the LXIII Legislature of the Mexican Congress, representing Nuevo León and the second electoral region.

== Life ==
After obtaining his Licentiate in business administration from the Autonomous University of Nuevo León in 1987, Martínez founded Grupo Plaza Cerralvo, S.A. de C.V., and was its general administrator from 1992 to 2009. His political career began in the mid-1990s as a town councilor in Cerralvo and in the Human Resources department of the state government of Nuevo León. He joined the PAN in 2001 and began teaching classes to PAN politicians at the national and state levels. He also was the local PAN's secretary of organization from 2000 to 2003 and its municipal-level president from 2004 to 2010.

After a three-year term as a local deputy in the LXXI Legislature of the Congress of Nuevo León, which met from 2006 to 2009, the PAN sent Martínez to the federal Chamber of Deputies for the first time in 2009, for the LXI Legislature. He sat on the Communications, Hydraulic Resources, Tourism, and Special for the Cuenca de Burgos Region Commissions. He also continued to serve as a state- and national-level councilor in the PAN, and after his term as a federal deputy expired, he was named the Chief Clerk of the Congress of Nuevo León.

For the second time, the PAN placed Martínez on its list from the second region, returning Martínez to San Lázaro for the LXIII Legislature. He served on the Infrastructure, Municipal Development and Hydraulic Resources Commissions; he was also an unused backup senator for the LXI and LXIII Legislatures.

== Personal ==
Martínez Montemayor's son, Baltazar Martínez Ríos, was elected mayor of Cerralvo in 2015, at the age of 25; he is the first PAN mayor in Cerralvo's history and the youngest in Nuevo León. Martínez Montemayor's brother was kidnapped in July 2010 while en route to visit relatives in the United States.
