= Fernando García Cuevas =

Mexican politician

Fernando Alberto García Cuevas
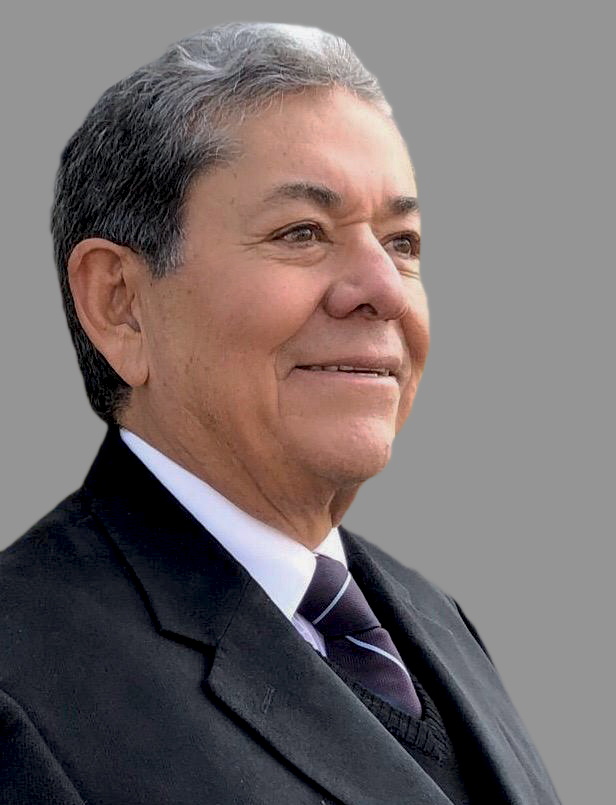
- Fernando Alberto García Cuevas

Member of the Chamber of Deputies for the State of Mexico's 2nd district
- In office 1 September 2003 – 31 August 2006
- Preceded by: Gustavo Alonso Donis García
- Succeeded by: Juan Abad de Jesús

Personal details
- Born: 2 April 1953 (age 72) Mexico City, Mexico
- Party: PRI
- Occupation: Politician

Fernando Alberto García Cuevas (born 2 April 1953) is a Mexican politician affiliated with the Institutional Revolutionary Party (PRI). In 2003–2006 he in the Chamber of Deputies during the 59th Congress, representing the State of Mexico's 2nd district.
