= Nelly Márquez Zapata =

Mexican politician

- Born: 26 May 1964 (age 62); Mérida, Yucatán, Mexico
- Occupation: Politician
- Political party: PAN

Nelly del Carmen Márquez Zapata (born 26 May 1964) is a Mexican politician of the National Action Party. She currently serves as local deputy in the Congress of Campeche from 2018 to 2021. She was a Federal Deputy in the Chamber of Deputies (Mexico) in the LXIII Legislature of the Mexican Congress, representing the third electoral region. It was denounced criminally for threatening to death a deputy of his own political party in Ciudad del Carmen, Campeche, in the middle of an internal process of election of local precandidates. She served as coordinator of the parliamentary group of her party in the Local Congress, but on January 8, 2019, she was dismissed by the State Committee of National Action in Campeche, in her place appointed to the deputy Jorge Alberto Nordahusen Carrizales. She also served in the same role in the LXI Legislature from 2009 to 2012.

== Life ==
Márquez Zapata was born in Mérida, Yucatán, but her life and political career are most closely associated with Campeche. She graduated from the Instituto Tecnológico de Campeche with a degree in business administration. In 1988, she invested in Congeladora Márquez, a seafood processing company, and two years later, she did the same in Marinos del Litoral, of which she was general administrator between 1990 and 2003 and an investor through 2015. She also served in several industry capacities, including as the president of the Campeche branch of the National Chamber of the Fishing Industry between 1995 and 1997.

In 2003, Márquez Zapata became an active PAN member, and that year, she ran for federal deputy and lost. Three years later, she won a seat in the state legislature of Campeche, where she presided over the Social Development Commission and during which time she also served as the president of the PAN in Campeche, and in 2009, she was finally elected as a proportional representation federal deputy. In the LXI Legislature, she was a secretary on the Fishing Commission with assignments to three others.

After three years away, the PAN sent Márquez Zapata to the Chamber of Deputies again in 2015. In December 2017, she became the president of a new oversight commission for the regulatory agencies in the energy sector. She also sat on four other commissions, as well as the Permanent Commission between December 2017 and January 2018.
