= Agustín Rodríguez Fuentes =

Mexican politician (1950–2022)

- Born: 28 August 1950; Oaxaca, Oaxaca, Mexico
- Died: 22 February 2022 (aged 71)
- Occupation: Politician
- Political party: PRD

Agustín Rodríguez Fuentes (28 August 1950 – 22 February 2022) was a Mexican politician affiliated with the Party of the Democratic Revolution (PRD). In the 2003 mid-terms he was elected to the Chamber of Deputies to represent the Federal District's 26th electoral district during the 59th session of Congress.

Rodríguez Fuentes died from COVID-19 in 2022 at the age of 71.
