= José Isidro Moreno Árcega =

Mexican politician and lawyer

- Born: 19 February 1972 (age 54); Federal District, Mexico
- Education: UNAM
- Occupations: Politician and lawyer
- Political party: PRI

José Isidro Moreno Árcega (born 19 February 1972) is a Mexican politician and lawyer affiliated with the Institutional Revolutionary Party (PRI). In the 2012 general election he was elected to the Chamber of Deputies to represent the State of Mexico's 13th district during the 62nd session of Congress, and he previously served in the Congress of the State of Mexico.
