= Jorge Schiaffino Isunza =

Mexican politician

Jorge Schiaffino Isunza (10 April 1947 – 11 December 2017) was a Mexican politician.

He studied law at Universidad Autónoma del Estado de Morelos. A member of the Institutional Revolutionary Party (PRI), Schiaffino Isunza served in several party posts in the state of Morelos before his election to the Chamber of Deputies for the Federal District's 26th electoral district in 1988. He was a deputy for a single term, and returned to local government service in Mexico City and San Luis Potosí. Schiaffino Isunza died in Mexico City on 11 December 2017, of a heart attack.
