= Martha Tagle Martínez =

Mexican politician

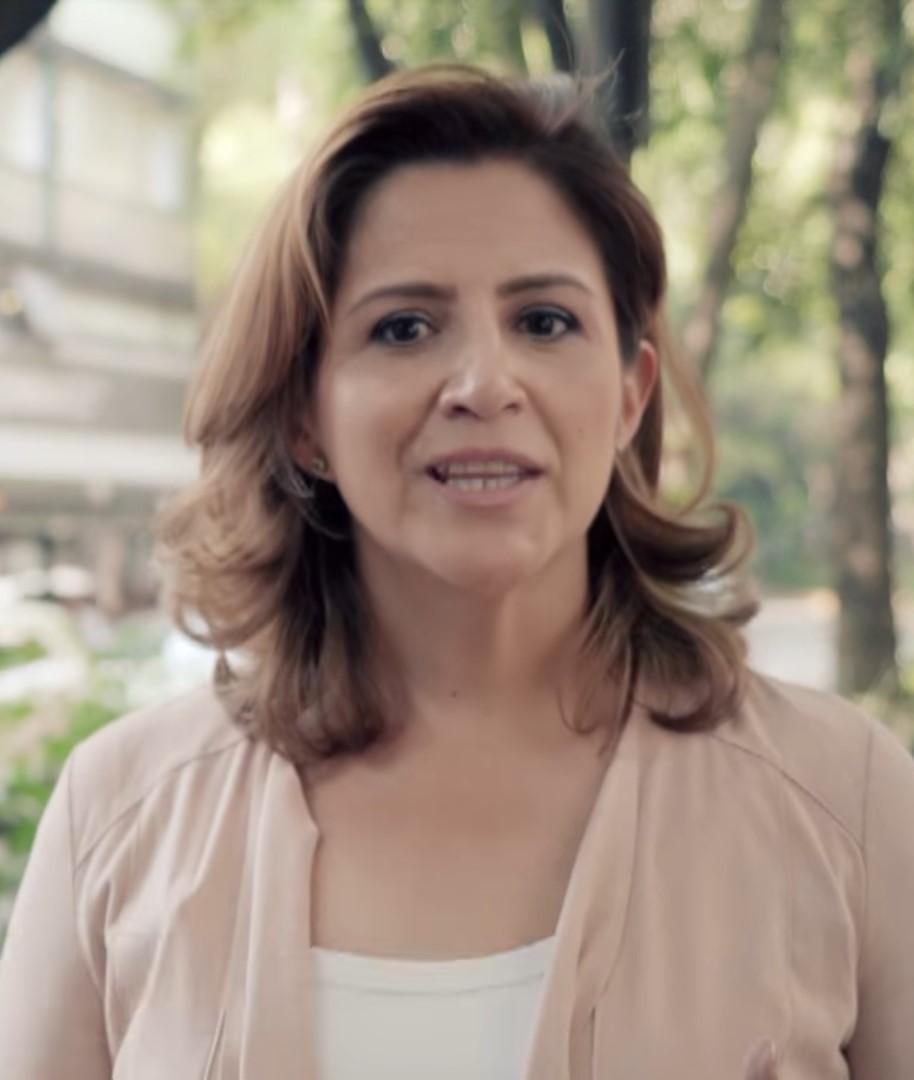
- Born: 26 November 1973 (age 52); Mexico City, Mexico
- Occupation: Politician
- Political party: MC

Martha Angélica Tagle Martínez (born 26 November 1973) is a Mexican politician from the Citizens' Movement. From 2006 to 2009 she served as Deputy of the LX Legislature of the Mexican Congress representing the Federal District.
