= Armando Neyra Chávez =

Mexican politician

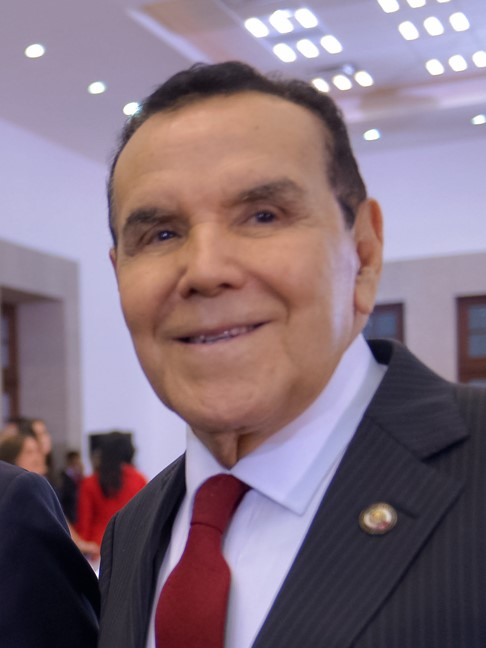
- Armando Neyra Chávez in 2017
- Born: 18 February 1937 (age 89); Toluca, Mexico
- Occupation: Politician
- Political party: PRI

Armando Neyra Chávez (born 18 February 1937) is a Mexican politician affiliated with the Institutional Revolutionary Party (PRI). He served as a Senator during the 62nd Congress. He also served as a deputy during five Congressional sessions (1979–82, for the State of Mexico's 2nd district; 1991–94, 1997–2000, 2003–06, and 2009–12). Only with verified Elementary School education
