= Cristina González Cruz =

Mexican lawyer and politician

- Born: 25 July 1973 (age 52); Mexico City, Mexico
- Occupations: Politician and Lawyer
- Political party: PRI

Cristina González Cruz (born 25 July 1973) is a Mexican politician and lawyer affiliated with the Institutional Revolutionary Party (PRI). In the 2012 general election she was elected to the Chamber of Deputies to represent the State of Mexico's 39th district during the 62nd session of Congress.
