= Santiago Taboada =

Mexican politician (born 1985)

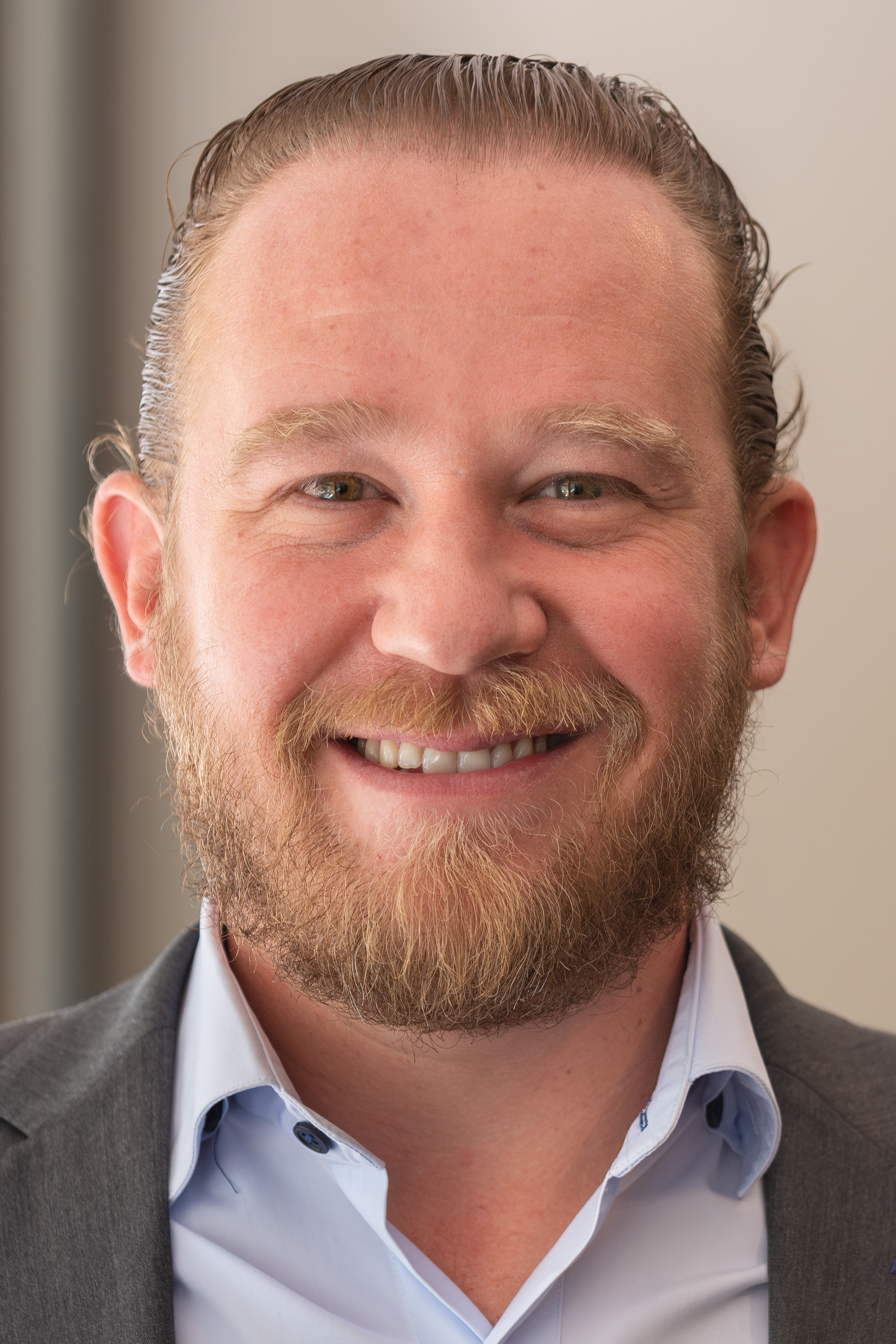
- Taboada in 2023

Mayor of Benito Juárez
- In office 1 October 2018 – 1 December 2023
- Preceded by: Ángel Luna Pacheco
- Succeeded by: Jaime Isael Mata Salas

Personal details
- Born: 14 October 1985 (age 40)
- Party: National Action Party

Santiago Taboada Cortina (born 14 October 1985) is a Mexican politician from the National Action Party (PAN). From 2018 to 2023, he served as mayor of Benito Juárez, Mexico City. From 2015 to 2018, he was a plurinominal member of the Chamber of Deputies. From 2012 to 2015, he was a member of the Congress of Mexico City. From 2016 to 2017, he was a member of the Constituent Assembly of Mexico City. In the 2024 local elections, he was a candidate for head of government of Mexico City but placed second behind Clara Brugada of a MORENA-led coalition.
