= José Luis Gutiérrez Calzadilla =

Mexican politician

- Born: 23 October 1944 (age 81); Mexico City, Mexico
- Occupation: Politician
- Political party: PRD

José Luis Gutiérrez Calzadilla (born 23 October 1944) is a Mexican politician affiliated with the Party of the Democratic Revolution (PRD). In the 2006 general election he was elected to the Chamber of Deputies to represent the Federal District's 26th electoral district during the 60th session of Congress.
