= María Elena Barrera =

Mexican politician

Maria Elena Barrera
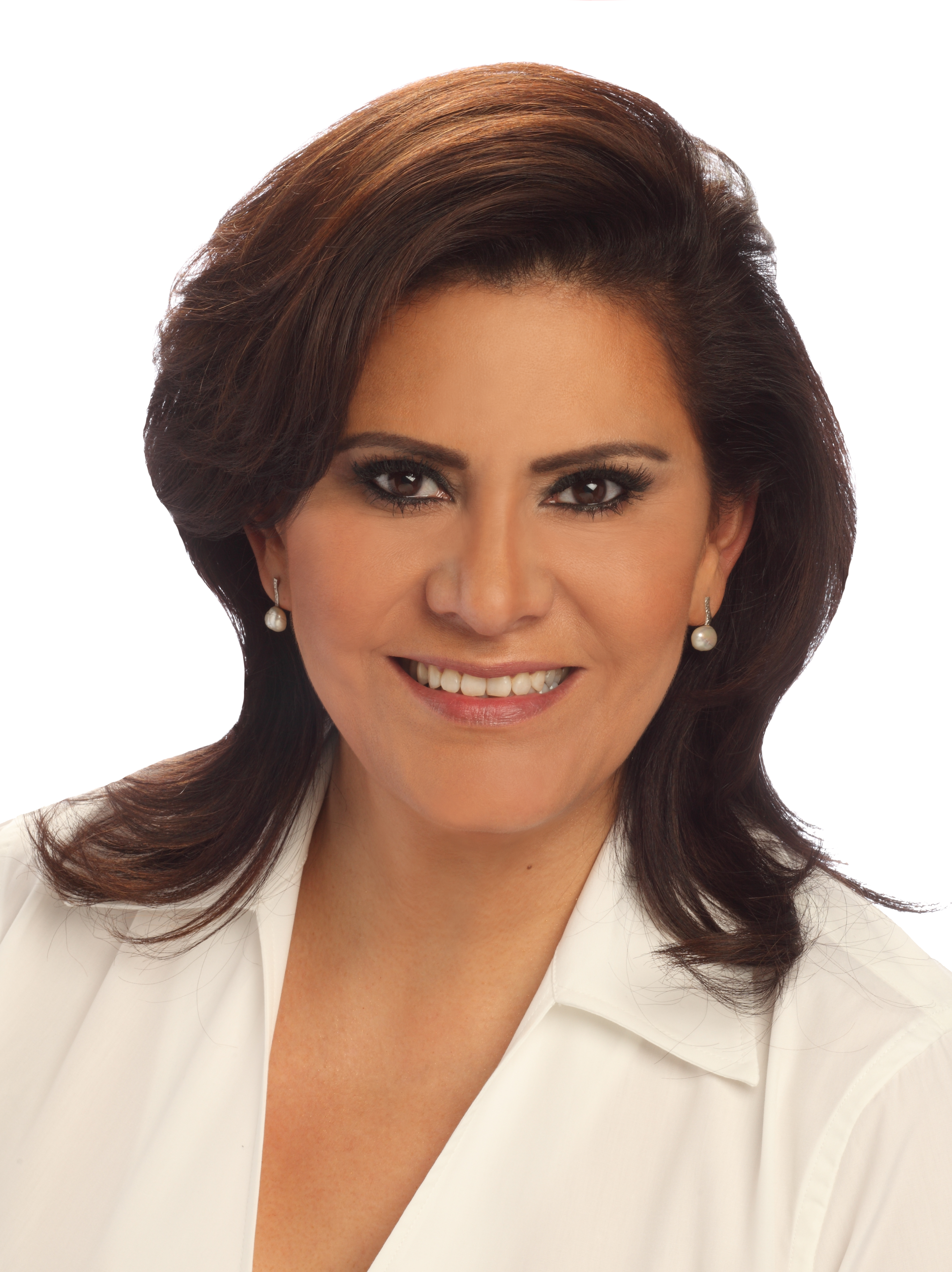
- Born: 22 September 1960 (age 65); Toluca, Mexico
- Occupation: Senator
- Political party: PVEM

Maria Elena Barrera Tapia (born 22 September 1960) is a Mexican politician affiliated with the PVEM. She currently serves as Senator of the LXII Legislature of the Mexican Congress representing the Mexico State.
