= Joel Ayala Almeida =

Mexican politician (1946–2025)

- Born: 20 December 1946; San Luis Río Colorado, Sonora, Mexico
- Died: 27 January 2025 (aged 78); Mexico City, Mexico
- Occupations: Trade unionist, politician
- Political party: PRI

Joel Ayala Almeida (20 December 1946 – 27 January 2025) was a Mexican trade unionist and politician affiliated with the Institutional Revolutionary Party (PRI). He was the president of the Federation of State Workers' Unions (FSTSE) from 1998 until his death.

Ayala Almeida served several terms in Congress, both in the Chamber of Deputies and in the Senate.

== Life ==
Joel Ayala Almeida was born in San Luis Río Colorado, Sonora, in 1946. After earning a degree in economics from the National Autonomous University of Mexico (UNAM), he began his political and trade-union career with the National Union of Workers of the Secretariat of Health. Between 1995 and 1998 he served as that union's general secretary.

In 1998 he was elected president of the FSTSE, an umbrella organization for state workers' unions. He remained in that position until his death in Mexico City on 27 January 2025, shortly after he was sworn in for a further six-year term in December 2024.

Ayala Almeida died in Mexico City on 27 January 2025, at the age of 78.

== Electoral history ==
Election	Body	Representing	Congress	Term
1979 mid-terms	Chamber of Deputies	Federal District's 13th	51st	1979–1982
1997 mid-terms	Chamber of Deputies	1st region	57th	1997–2000
2000 general election	Senate	National list	58th 59th	2000–2003; 2003–2006
2006 general election	Chamber of Deputies	1st region	60th	2006–2009
2012 general election	Senate	National list	62nd 63rd	2012–2015; 2015–2018
