= Hilda Esthela Flores Escalera =

Mexican politician

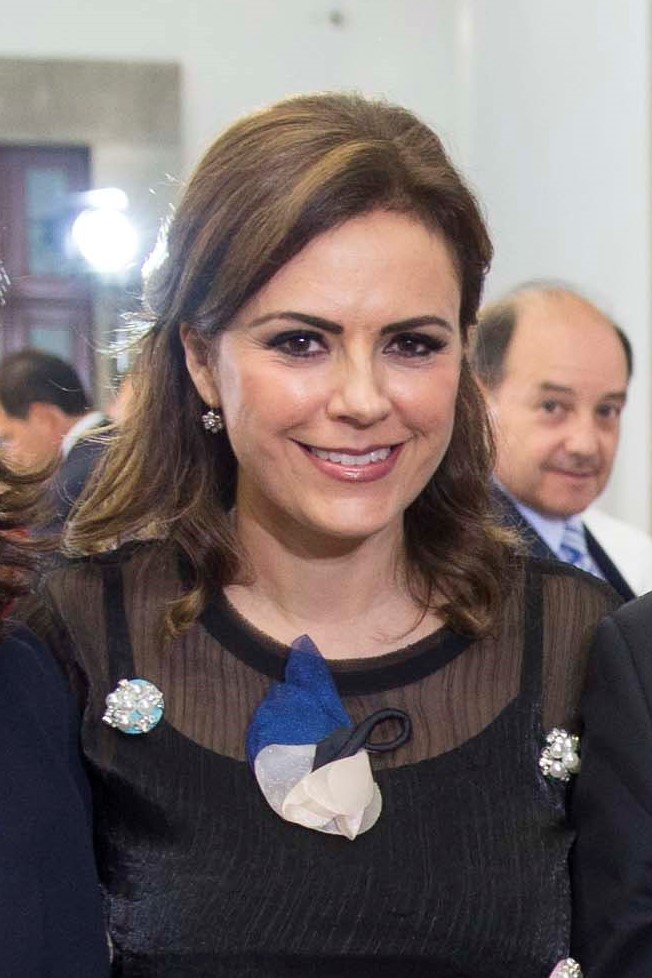
- 2017
- Born: 9 September 1970 (age 55); Saltillo, Coahuila, Mexico
- Occupation: Senator
- Political party: PRI

Hilda Esthela Flores Escalera (born 9 September 1970) is a Mexican politician affiliated with the Institutional Revolutionary Party (PRI). She served as a senator-at-large in the 62nd session of Congress. She also served as a plurinominal deputy during the 61st session of Congress.
