= Margarita Flores Sánchez =

Mexican politician

- Born: 10 December 1961 (age 64); Culiacán, Sinaloa, Mexico
- Occupation: Senator
- Political party: PRI

Margarita Flores Sánchez (born 10 December 1961) is a Mexican politician affiliated with the PRI. She currently serves as Senator of the LXII Legislature of the Mexican Congress representing Nayarit.
