= Silvia Guadalupe Garza =

Mexican politician

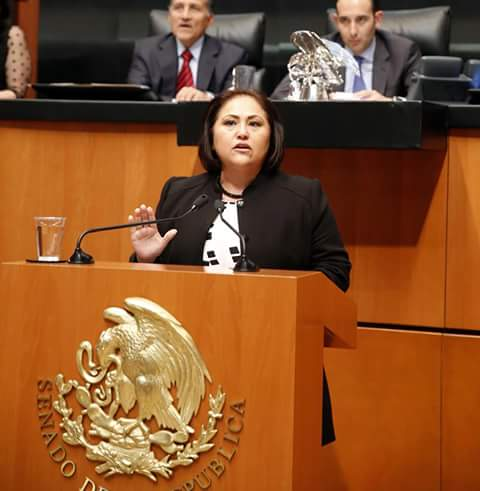
- Silvia Guadalupe Garza in 2010
- Born: 5 July 1962 (age 64); Monclova, Coahuila, Mexico
- Education: UANL
- Occupation: Senator
- Political party: PAN

Silvia Guadalupe Garza Galván (born 5 July 1962) is a Mexican politician affiliated with the PAN. She currently serves as Senator of the LXII Legislature of the Mexican Congress representing Coahuila.
