= Carlos Alberto Puente Salas =

Mexican politician

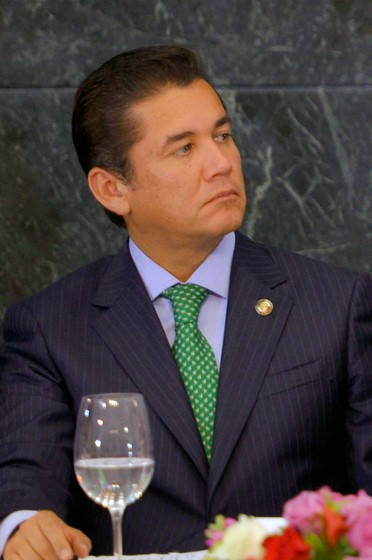
- Puente Salas in 2017
- Born: 16 December 1971 (age 54); Zacatecas, Zacatecas, Mexico
- Occupation: Politician
- Political party: PVEM

Carlos Alberto Puente Salas (born 16 December 1971) is a Mexican politician affiliated with the Ecologist Green Party of Mexico (PVEM).

In the 2012 general election he was elected to the Senate for Zacatecas. He also sat in the Chamber of Deputies in 2006–2009 and 2021–2024 as a plurinominal deputy. He returned to a plurinominal seat in the lower house in the 2024 general election.

Puente Salas replaced Pablo Escudero Morales as the Green Party's designee to the Constituent Assembly of Mexico City after Escudero became the president of the board of directors of the Senate.
