= Gerardo Liceaga Arteaga =

Mexican politician

- Born: 3 October 1960 (age 65); State of Mexico, Mexico
- Occupations: Journalist and news anchor
- Political party: PRI

Gerardo Francisco Liceaga Arteaga (born 3 October 1960) is a Mexican sports journalist and politician affiliated with the Institutional Revolutionary Party (PRI). In 2012–2015, he served in the Chamber of Deputies representing the State of Mexico's second district.

From 1985 until 2009, he was reporter and anchor of Televisa Deportes covering events as the FIFA World Cup. In 2009, he was elected municipal president of Teoloyucan, State of Mexico.
