= Ana Lilia Herrera Anzaldo =

Mexican politician (born 1971)

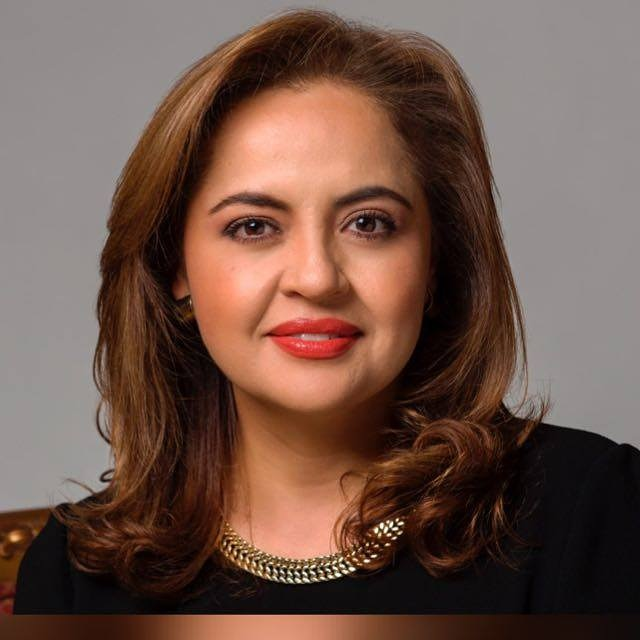
- Herrera Anzaldo in 2018

Senator of the Congress of the Union for the State of Mexico
- In office 15 June 2017 – 31 August 2018
- Preceded by: María Lorena Marín Moreno
- Succeeded by: Delfina Gómez Álvarez
- In office 1 September 2012 – 2016
- Preceded by: Yeidckol Polevnsky
- Succeeded by: María Lorena Marín Moreno

Personal details
- Born: 29 August 1971 (age 54) Mexico City, Mexico
- Party: PRI
- Education: UNAM; ITAM

Ana Lilia Herrera Anzaldo (born 29 August 1971) is a Mexican politician affiliated with the Institutional Revolutionary Party (PRI).

In the 2012 general election she was elected to the Senate to represent the State of Mexico. She returned to Congress in the 2021 mid-terms to represent the State of Mexico's 27th district in the Chamber of Deputies.
