= Yolanda de la Torre =

Mexican politician

- Born: 6 April 1964 (age 62); Durango, Mexico
- Occupation: Politician
- Political party: PRI

Yolanda de la Torre Valdez (born 6 April 1964) is a Mexican politician from the Institutional Revolutionary Party. From 2009 to 2012 she served as Deputy of the LXI Legislature of the Mexican Congress representing Durango.
