= Lisbeth Hernández Lecona =

Mexican politician

- Born: 10 April 1974 (age 52); Mexico City, Mexico
- Occupation: Senator
- Political party: PRI

Lisbeth Hernández Lecona (born 10 April 1974) is a Mexican politician affiliated with the Partido Revolucionario Institucional (PRI). She currently serves as senator of the LXII Legislature of the Mexican Congress, representing Morelos.
