= Mariana Gómez del Campo =

Mexican politician

Mariana Gómez del Campo Gurza
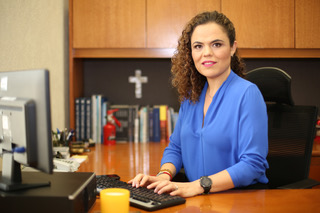
- Mariana Gómez del Campo as Secretary of International Affairs of the PAN National Executive Committee
- Born: 7 August 1978 (age 48); Miguel Hidalgo, D.F., Mexico
- Occupation: Senator
- Political party: PAN
- Website: http://www.marranagomezdelcampo.mx/web/

Mariana Gómez del Campo Gurza (born 7 August 1978) is a Mexican politician affiliated with the PAN. She served as Senator of the LXII Legislature of the Mexican Congress.

== Education and professional career ==
Gomez del Campo has a degree in Communications from Universidad Anáhuac del Norte and a Master's degree in Government and Public Policy from the Universidad Panamericana. She has completed studies in law at the Instituto Tecnológico Autónomo de Mexico, as well as Communication and Political Marketing in the Konrad Adenauer Foundation.

Within her leadership roles, Gomez del Campo held the position of Coordinator of the Youth Campaign for the former president of the Republic, Felipe Calderón Hinojosa. She later went on to form part of the III Legislation by becoming a Local Legislator from 2003 to 2006. By 2007, she had become the first woman president of the PAN for the Federal District, a position she held for three years. From 2009 to 2012 during the V Legislation, she held the position of Local Legislature and Coordinator for PAN in the Legislative Assembly of the Federal District.

== Senate of the Republic ==
=== Commissions ===
She served as Senator to the Republic for the 64th legislation from 2012-2018 where she held the position of the President of the Commission on Latin America and the Caribbean Foreign Affairs, Secretary to the Commission for the Federal District, member of the Commission for Radio, Television and Cinematography, as well as being member to the Special Commission for Metropolitan Development, commissions for Culture, Human Rights and Mobility, and Committee to Promote Reading.

== Professional Media Attributions ==
She collaborates in assorted media outlets, including Reforma, La Crónica de Hoy, Publimetro, Milenio, máspormás, Eje Central and Animal Político, as well as Reporte 98.5 and Radio Fórmula.
