= María Quiñones Cornejo =

Mexican politician

- Born: 24 February 1956 (age 70); Mexico City, Mexico
- Occupation: Politician
- Political party: PRI

María de la Paz Quiñones Cornejo (born 24 February 1956) is a Mexican politician from the Institutional Revolutionary Party (PRI).

She has been elected to the Chamber of Deputies for the Federal District's 26th electoral district twice: in the 2009 mid-terms for the National Action Party (PAN), and in the 2015 mid-terms for the PRI.
