= Ángel Ávila Romero =

Mexican politician

President of the Party of the Democratic Revolution (interim)
- In office 22 October 2018 – 9 December 2018
- Preceded by: Manuel Granados Covarrubias
- Succeeded by: 'Extraordinary National Directorate' (Ángel Ávila, Fernando Belaunzarán, Karen Quiroga, Adriana Díaz and Estefany Santiago)

Secretary General of the Party of the Democratic Revolution
- In office 9 December 2017 – 22 October 2018
- Preceded by: Beatriz Mojica Morga
- Succeeded by: Vacancy

Personal details
- Born: 26 July 1980 (age 46) Mexico City, Mexico
- Party: PRD
- Education: National Autonomous University of Mexico

Ángel Clemente Ávila Romero (born July 26, 1980) is a Mexican politician and political scientist who is the current interim President of the Party of the Democratic Revolution (PRD). From 2008 to 2011 he was Secretary of Youth Affairs of the National Executive Committee, later he was appointed President of the National Council of the Party of the Democratic Revolution in 2014, a position he left on December 9, 2017 when he was appointed Secretary General of the same party. He was president of the National Executive Committee from October 22 to December 9, 2018, from December 10 a member of the party's Extraordinary National Directorate.

== Early years ==
From a very young age Ávila began his political career as "PRD Brigadista del Sol" in the campaign to the head of government of the Federal District of Cuauhtémoc Cárdenas. Later, he was youth coordinator of the national political group "Causa Ciudadana".

He studied a degree in political science at the Faculty of Political and Social Sciences of the National Autonomous University of Mexico, graduating with an honorable mention. During his time at the university, he was a student advisor to his faculty, host of the radio program "Sharing experiences 2000-2003".

Subsequently, he entered fully into the political activities of the PRD as National Leader of Left Youth (2008-2011) and later as private secretary of Jesús Zambrano Grijalva, president of the PRD, between 2011 and 2014.

== Political career ==
In 2014, Ávila was appointed president of the National Council of the Party of the Democratic Revolution. From this position he had to receive and process the resignation of Agustín Basave from the presidency from the PRD CEN on Jan 11 2016.

The presidency of the National Council left her on December 9, 2017 to become the general secretary of the CEN of the PRD, during the presidency of Manuel Granados Covarrubias.

His work at the head of the party is to co-implement the 2018 electoral process that begins with the start-up of the coalition "Por México al Frente" formed on December 8 (one day before taking possession of the presidency of the PRD).

Before the resignation of Manuel Granados Covarrubias on October 22, 2018, Ávila remains as provisional president of the PRD.
