= Manuel Granados Covarrubias =

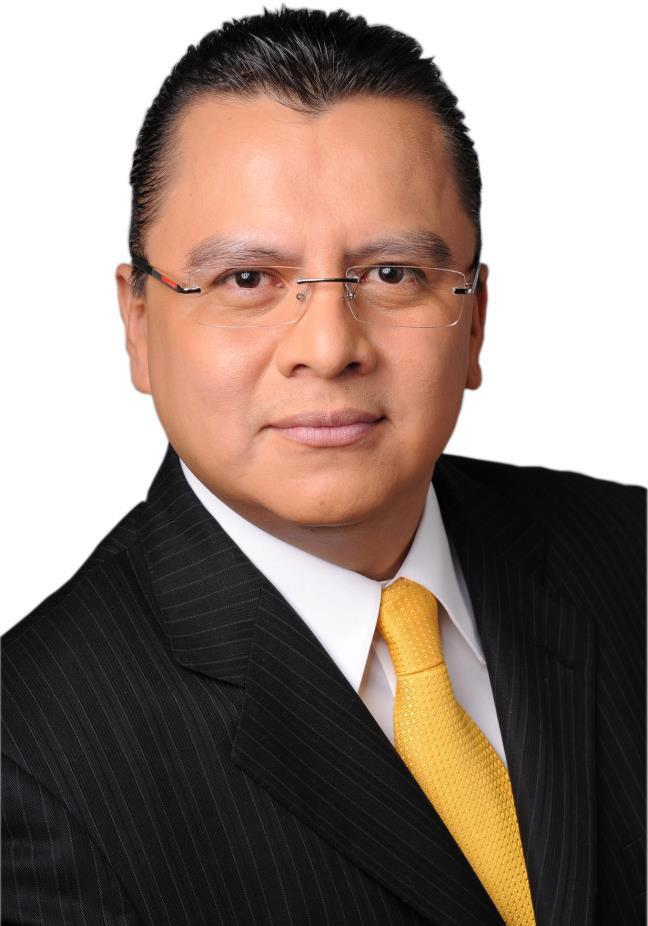

President of the Party of the Democratic Revolution
- In office 9 December 2017 – 22 October 2018
- Preceded by: Alejandra Barrales
- Succeeded by: Ángel Ávila Romero

Counselor for Legal and Legal Services of the Federal District
- In office 15 July 2015 – 9 December 2017
- Governor: Miguel Ángel Mancera
- Preceded by: José Ramón Amieva
- Succeeded by: Vicente Lopantzi García

Personal details
- Born: 1 August 1974 (age 52) Mexico City, Mexico
- Party: Party of the Democratic Revolution
- Education: National Autonomous University of Mexico
- Profession: Lawyer

Manuel Granados Covarrubias (Iztapalapa, Mexico City, August 1, 1974) is a lawyer with a specialty in constitutional law who was appointed in July 2015 of the Legal Department and Legal Services of the Federal District by Miguel Ángel Mancera, head of government of the Federal District. His main task was to finalize the reform of the Federal District and promote the Political Constitution of Mexico City. On December 9, 2017, he resigned as legal adviser to the country's capital to be elected as president of the National Executive Council of the Party of the Democratic Revolution.

== Early years ==
He was born and raised in the San Ignacio neighborhood of Iztapalapa. The son of lawyer and former deputy Manuel Granados Chirinos and his wife, Atala Evangelina Covarrubias. He is the youngest of the couple's three children; he is preceded by the dentist Jessica María (b. 1972) and Liliana Andrea (b. 1973), graduate in international relations. His family was very disciplined and fostered his education. He regularly earn academic honors and was noted for his oratory skills at school ceremonies. He also participated in sports, baseball being his favorite, and he played in the "Mexica" youth league and on a national team.

== Studies ==
He attended high school at the National Preparatory School, Campus No. 6 Antonio Caso, of the National Autonomous University of Mexico, while winning various public-speaking competitions. He continued his undergraduate studies at the Faculty of Law of the same university, where he was a student of Ignacio Burgoa in the matter of guarantees and protection; Raúl Carrancá and Rivas in the matter of criminal law; and the rector José Sarukhán. He graduated in 1999 and continued his studies with a specialty in Constitutional and Administrative Law, a Master of Laws with Honorable Mention, a Diploma in Political Analysis from the Universidad Iberoamericana and another Master in Local Public Management and Management from the Universidad Carlos III of Madrid, Spain.

His academic development continued with a doctorate in public administration at the National Institute of Public Administration and a doctorate in law from UNAM.

Since 2004 he has been a professor of law at the Faculty of Law of his alma mater.

== Administrative and political background ==
=== Early years ===
At the age of 12, at the invitation of Professor Parra, his math teacher, he entered politics by participating in different marches and movements of teachers in Iztapalapa. In high school, he actively participated in the Youth Cultural Association where he began giving lectures and gained experience in organization and leadership.

In July 2003, he was appointed advisor to the Sectoral Political Undersecretariat of the Secretariat for Agrarian Reform. In December 2006, he was appointed deputy legal director general in the same Secretariat. He left the federal government and became an advisor to the heads of the Federal District Attorney General's Office: Rodolfo Félix Cárdenas (2006-2008) and Miguel Ángel Mancera (2008-2012), with whom he entered into friendship.

=== Deputy of the DF ===
He was deputy for the 16th district to the Legislative Assembly of the Federal District (2012-2015), where he was president of the Government Commission and vice-president of the Special Commission on Detention.

=== Legal Counselor of Miguel Ángel Mancera ===
At the end of the legislature, he was appointed by Miguel Ángel Mancera as head of the Legal Department and Legal Services of the Federal District. From this position he held the technical secretariat of the group of notables responsible for drafting the first Political Constitution of Mexico City. Already during the work of the Constituent of Mexico City, he was in charge of promoting the approval of the Constitution.

=== President of the PRD ===
During the work of the political reform of the Federal District, he joined the Party of the Democratic Revolution.

Years later, when the Alejandra Barrales presidency at the head of the PRD had to be renewed by provisions of the party's internal statutes (a situation ratified by the electoral justice system, which imposed the December 9, 2017 deadline), the Internal currents of the party (the so-called tribes) began to lobby who could be the successor to Barrales. National Democratic Alternative (ADN) led by Héctor Bautista and Progressive Vanguard under Héctor Serrano, proposed on the eve of the National Council meeting that the leadership would renew the proposal of the head of government of the capital that fell to Granados Covarrubias. On his own, the other PRD currents (Nueva Izquierda led by Jesús Zambrano and Jesús Ortega; Galileos Initiative led by Guadalupe Acosta Naranjo and Jorge Martínez; and Foro Nuevo Sol of Pascual Sígala) and Silvano Aureoles, PRD governor of Michoacán, presented their own proposals.

Hours before starting the National Council of the PRD on December 9, 2017, after hours of negotiations between the parties, the proposal of Granados Covarrubias was consolidated. Therefore, within hours of his resignation from the ownership of the Legal Department and Legal Services of the Federal District and later he was unanimously elected as the new CEN president of the party along with Ángel Ávila Romero as general secretary.

His work at the head of the party is to implement the 2018 electoral process that begins with the launch of the coalition "Por México al Frente" formed on December 8 (one day before taking possession of the PRD presidency).

On October 22, Manuel Granados Covarrubias sent a letter to the CEN of the PRD to present his resignation as head of this political institute.
