= Arturo Santana Alfaro =

Mexican politician

- Born: 28 June 1971 (age 55); Mexico City, Mexico
- Occupation: Politician
- Political party: Party of the Democratic Revolution

Arturo Santana Alfaro (Note: In this Mexican name, the surname is Santana and the second or maternal family name is Alfaro.) (born 28 June 1971) is a Mexican politician from the Party of the Democratic Revolution (PRD). In the 2015 mid-terms, he was elected to the Chamber of Deputies to represent the 18th congressional district of the Federal District.

== Life ==
Santana obtained his law degree from the National Autonomous University of Mexico (UNAM) in 1994, but he began working in public service the year before, in the Federal Public Ministry, assigned to the Fourth Court of the State of Mexico. In 1996, he left that post for a brief stint as an advisor to the deputy attorney for General Coordination and Development in the Office of the Attorney General of Mexico (PGR); in 1998, he was a private secretary for the PGR's director of Specialized Public Ministry "B".

In 2000, Santana took on his first legislative position, coordinating advisors to the local deputies in the second session of the Legislative Assembly of the Federal District (ALDF). He then went on to positions in Mexico City's government, including territorial director of Santa Catarina (2003–05) and planning director in Iztapalapa (2005).

2006 saw Santana win an election to the first time, to the ALDF's 4th session. He served as the Vice President of the Local Public Administration Commission, a secretary of the Commission for Administration and Prosecution of Justice, as well as a member of two other commissions: Political-Electoral Matters and Public Security.

After that term ended, in the 2009 mid-terms he was elected to the Chamber of Deputies to represent Mexico City's 22nd congressional district during the 61st Congress. He presided over the Citizen Participation Commission and served on other commissions, primarily related with accounting, proper use of government electoral resources, and public security. He also served as an alternate representative of the PRD's legislators to the General Council of the Federal Electoral Institute.

In 2012, Santana returned to the ALDF for its 6th session. He presided over the Jurisdictional Commission and served on seven others.

Three years later, Santana returned to the federal Chamber of Deputies for the 63rd Congress, representing Mexico City's 18th congressional district. He sat on three commissions: Justice, Transportation, and Drinking Water and Sanitation. In October 2015, Santana presented a proposal on behalf of other PRD deputies to raise the minimum daily wage from 70 pesos to 95.

== Personal ==
In 2013, Santana accused his wife, Teresa Serratos Alvarado, with breach of trust when she stole more than 150,000 pesos, which was never proved. In 2019, he was arrested in Iztapalapa on a firearms offence.
