= Eduardo Mendoza =

Eduardo Mendoza may refer to:

- Eduardo Mendoza Arellano (born 1971), Mexican congressman
- Eduardo Mendoza Garriga (born 1943), Spanish novelist
- Eduardo Mendoza Goiticoa (1917–2009), Venezuelan scientific researcher, politician, and statesman
- Eduardo Mendoza (footballer) (born 1993), Mexican footballer
