= Grijalva =

Grijalva may refer to:

== Places ==
- The Grijalva River in Mexico
- Juan del Grijalva, Chiapas, town in Mexico
- Luciana B. Grijalva House, New Mexico, U.S.

== People ==
- Axel Grijalva (born 2000), Mexican footballer
- Adelita Grijalva (born 1970), American politician and daughter of Raúl Grijalva
- Gonzalo Abad Grijalva (1910–2009), Ecuadorian educator
- Hernando de Grijalva (died 1537), Spanish explorer
- Jesús Zambrano Grijalva (born 1953), Mexican politician
- Juan de Grijalva (c. 1490–1527), Spanish explorer
- Lucila Villaseñor Grijalva, American artist
- Luis Grijalva (born 1999), Guatemalan long distance runner
- Raúl Grijalva (1948–2025), American politician
- Tracy Grijalva (born 1959), American heavy-metal guitarist
