= Sandra Cuevas =

Mexican politician

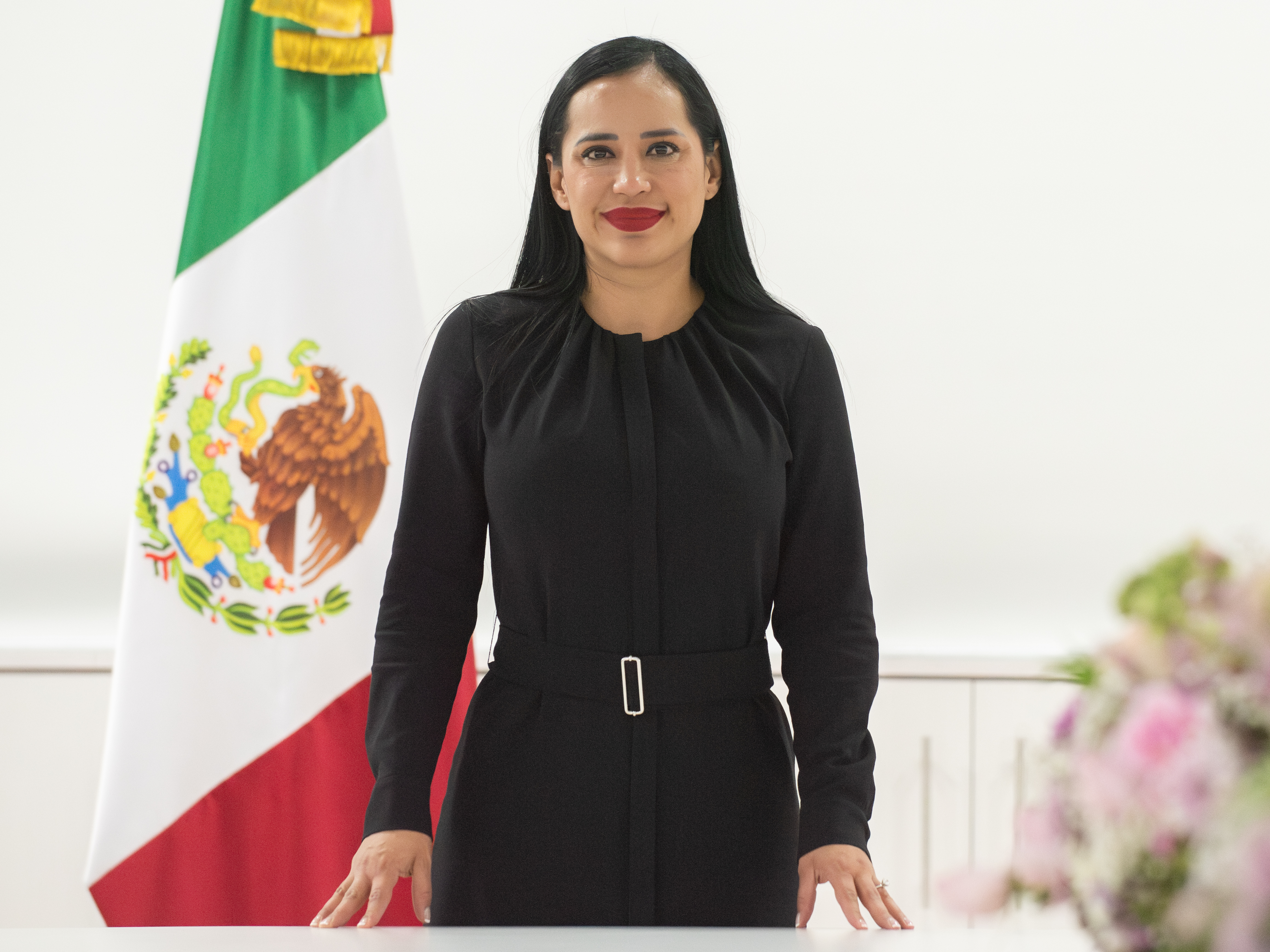
Cuevas in 2023

Sandra Xantall Cuevas Nieves (born 25 May 1986) is a Mexican politician and business owner. Born in Azcapotzalco, Mexico City, she is a graduate in international commerce from the Universidad del Valle de México.

Cuevas served as the mayor of the Mexico City borough of Cuauhtémoc from 1 October 2021 to 1 March 2024, representing the Party of the Democratic Revolution (PRD) in alliance with the Institutional Revolutionary Party (PRI) and the National Action Party (PAN).

On 27 February 2024 the Congress of Mexico City granted her a leave of absence from her position as mayor to contend in the 2 June Senate election. She competed in the election as the second name on the two-name formula presented by the Citizens' Movement party (MC) for Mexico City's seats in the national Senate, alongside Alejandra Barrales, also formerly of the PRD. In that contest, however, MC placed a distant third behind the Sigamos Haciendo Historia and Fuerza y Corazón por México coalitions.
