= David Mendoza Arellano =

Mexican politician

- Born: 19 October 1970 (age 55); Mexico City, Mexico
- Occupation: Politician
- Political party: PRD

David Mendoza Arellano (born 19 October 1970), known as David Mendoza, is a Mexican politician affiliated with the Party of the Democratic Revolution (PRD). In 2006–2009 he served as a federal deputy in the 60th Congress, representing the Federal District's eighteenth district for the PRD.
