= Alfaro (surname) =

Alfaro is a Portuguese surname. People with the surname include:

== In the arts ==
- Carlota Alfaro (born 1933), Puerto Rican fashion designer
- Emilio Alfaro (1933–1998), Argentine actor and director
- Hugo Alfaro (1917–1996), Uruguayan journalist
- Julia Alfaro (born 1980), Spanish actor
- Luis Alfaro (born 1963), American performer and activist
- Oscar Alfaro (1921–1963), Bolivian writer
- Xiomara Alfaro (1930–2018), Cuban opera singer

== In politics and government ==
- Bernardo Soto Alfaro (1854–1931), President of Costa Rica
- Eloy Alfaro (1842–1912), President of Ecuador
- Enrique Alfaro Ramírez (1973), Mayor of Guadalajara, Mexico
- Eric Alfaro (born 1982), Puerto Rican politician
- Fernando Chamorro Alfaro (1824–1863), Nicaraguan general
- Rufina Alfaro, Panamanian independence figure
- Prudencio Alfaro(1861–1915)
- Ricardo J. Alfaro (1882–1971)
- Colon Eloy Alfaro (son of Eloy Alfaro)

== In sports ==
=== Given name A–F ===
- Alejandro Alfaro (born 1986), Spanish footballer
- Álvaro Misael Alfaro (born 1971), Salvadoran footballer
- Boris Alfaro (born 1988), Panamanian footballer
- Carlos Alfaro Moreno (born 1964), Argentine retired footballer
- Cristián Alfaro (born 1987), Argentine footballer
- Diana Alfaro (born 2001), Peruvian footballer
- Emiliano Alfaro (born 1988), Uruguayan footballer
- Enrique Alfaro Rojas (born 1974), Mexican footballer
- Éver Alfaro (born 1982), Costa Rican footballer
- Fabián Alfaro (born 1981), Chilean footballer
- Fabricio Alfaro (born 1990), Salvadoran footballer
- Flavio Alfaro, American Olympic baseball player
- Francisco López Alfaro (born 1962), Spanish footballer and manager

=== Given name G–Z ===
- Gustavo Alfaro (born 1962), Argentine footballer and manager
- Jason Alfaro (born 1977), American baseball player
- Jorge Alfaro (born 1993), American baseball player
- José Alfaro (boxer) (born 1983), Nicaraguan boxer
- Manuel Alfaro (born 1971), Spanish footballer and manager
- Mauricio Alfaro (born 1956), Salvadoran footballer and manager
- Nathalia Alfaro (born 1987), Costa Rican beach volleyball player
- Pablo Alfaro (born 1969), a Spanish footballer
- Rafael Alfaro, Salvadoran Olympic swimmer
- Roque Alfaro (born 1956), Argentine footballer and manager
- Sandro Alfaro (born 1971), Costa Rican footballer
- Wardy Alfaro (born 1977), Costa Rican footballer and coach

== Other people ==
- Anastasio Alfaro (1865–1951), Costa Rican scientist and explorer
- Rosie Alfaro (born 1971), American convicted murderer

== See also ==
- Alfaro (disambiguation)
