= 18th federal electoral district of Mexico City =

Federal electoral district of Mexico

Mexico City's 18th
- Electoral district of the Chamber of Deputies of Mexico

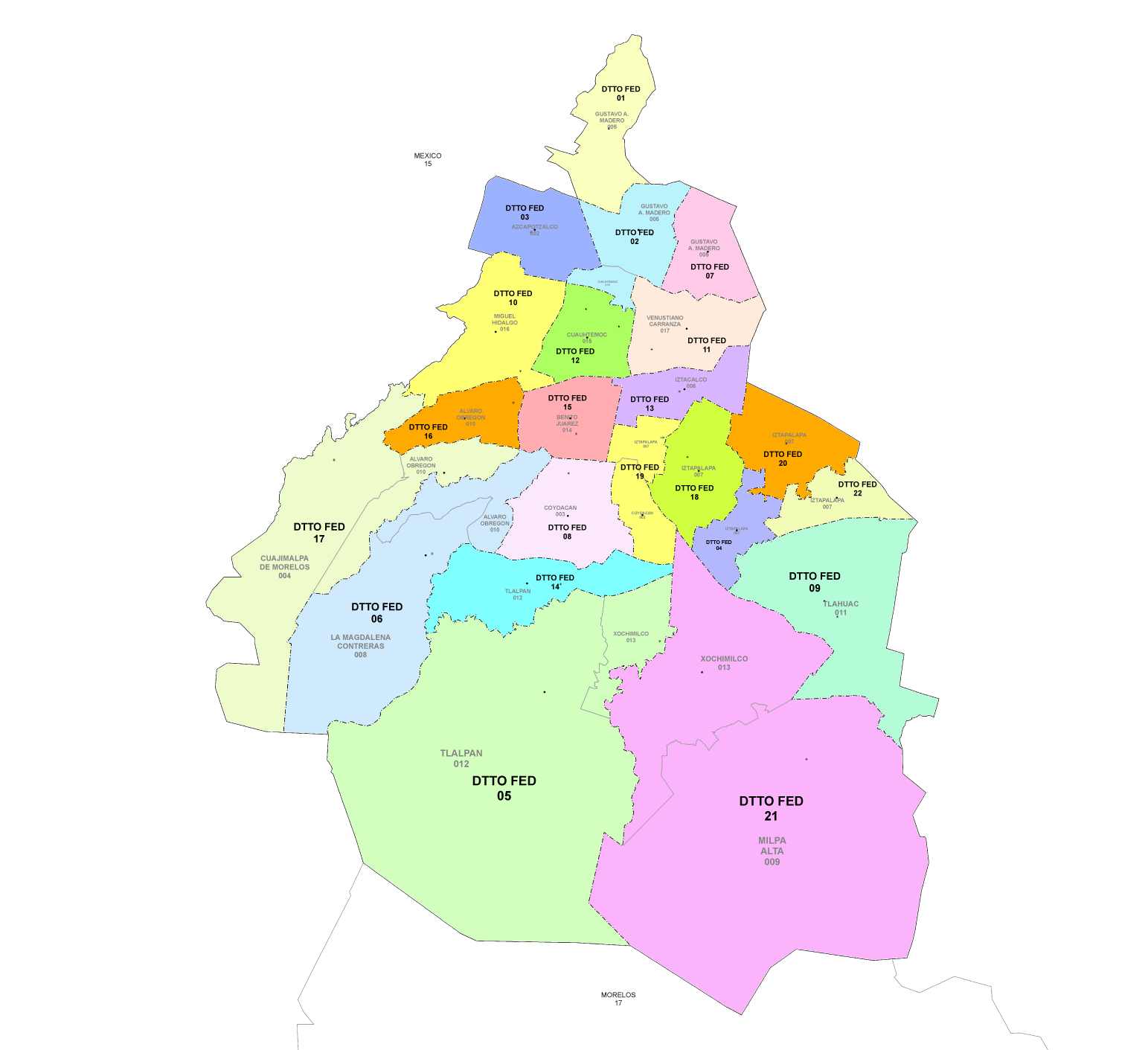
- 18th district since 2023

Incumbent
- Member: Gabriel García Hernández
- Party: ▌Morena
- Congress: 66th (2024–2027)

District
- State: Mexico City
- Head town: Iztapalapa
- Coordinates: 19°21′30″N 99°05′35″W
- Covers: Iztapalapa (part)
- PR region: Fourth
- Precincts: 260
- Population: 446,660 (2020 census)

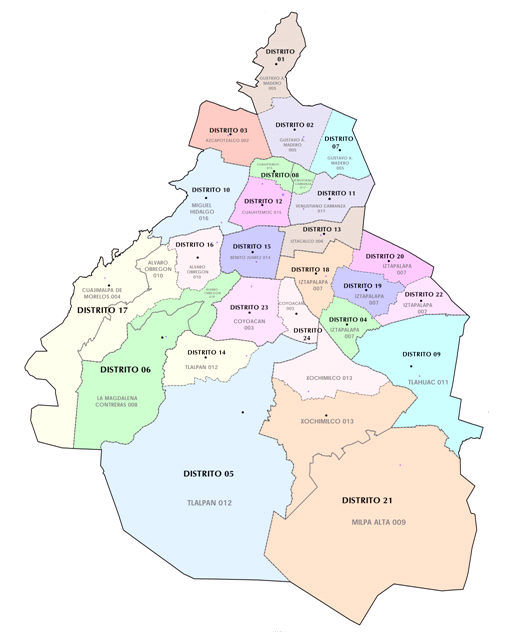
Mexico City under the 2017–2022 districting plan

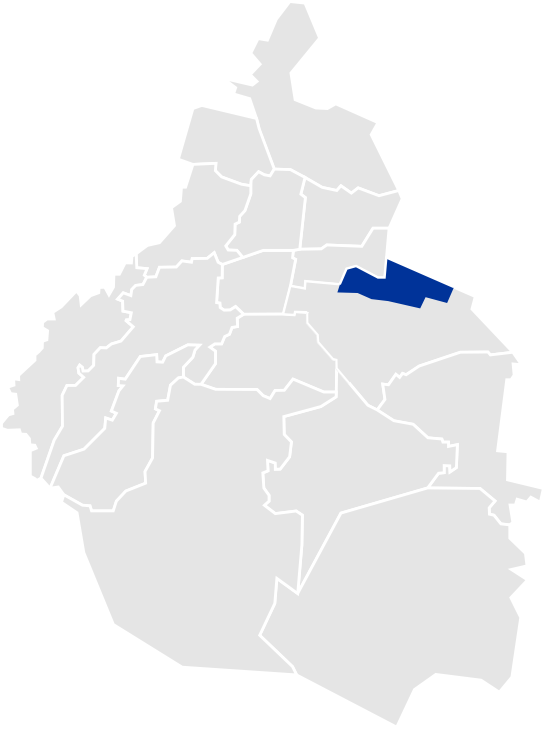
2005–2017 eighteenth district shaded blue

The 18th federal electoral district of Mexico City (Spanish: Distrito electoral federal 18 de la Ciudad de México; prior to 2016, "of the Federal District") is one of the 300 electoral districts into which Mexico is divided for elections to the federal Chamber of Deputies and one of the 22 currently operational districts in Mexico City.

It elects one deputy to the lower house of Congress for each three-year legislative session by means of the first-past-the-post system. Votes cast in the district also count towards the calculation of proportional representation ("plurinominal") deputies elected from the fourth region.

The current member for the district, elected in the 2024 general election, is Gabriel García Hernández of the National Regeneration Movement (Morena).

== District territory ==
Under the 2023 districting plan adopted by the National Electoral Institute (INE), which is to be used for the 2024, 2027 and 2030 federal elections, the 18th district covers 260 electoral precincts (secciones electorales) in the central portion of the borough (alcaldía) of Iztapalapa.

The district reported a population of 446,660 in the 2020 census.

== Previous districting schemes ==
Evolution of electoral district numbers
	1974	1978	1996	2005	2017	2023
Mexico City (Federal District)	27	40	30	27	24	22
Chamber of Deputies	196	300				

2017–2022

In the 2017 plan, the 18th district comprised 261 precincts in the west of the borough of Iztapalapa.

2005–2017

Under the 2005 districting scheme, the district covered the northern portion of Iztapalapa.

1996–2005

Between 1996 and 2005, the district covered practically the same area of Iztapalapa as in the 2005 scheme.

1978–1996

The districting scheme in force from 1978 to 1996 was the result of the 1977 electoral reforms, which increased the number of single-member seats in the Chamber of Deputies from 196 to 300. Under that plan, the Federal District's seat allocation rose from 27 to 40. The 18th district covered a portion of the borough of Miguel Hidalgo.

== Deputies returned to Congress ==
(Mexico) National parties
- Current
- PAN
- PRI
- PT
- PVEM
- MC
- Morena
- PAZ
- Somos
- Defunct or local only
- PLM
- PNR
- PRM
- PNM
- PP
- PPS
- PARM
- PFCRN
- CON
- PANAL
- PSD
- PES
- PES
- PRD

Mexico City's 18th district
Election	Deputy	Party	Term	Legislature
1952	Rodolfo Echeverría Álvarez	Institutional Revolutionary Party	1952–1955	42nd Congress
1955	Julio Ramírez Colozzi	Institutional Revolutionary Party	1955–1958	43rd Congress
1958	Antonio Castro Leal	Institutional Revolutionary Party	1958–1961	44th Congress
1961	Joaquín Gamboa Pascoe	Institutional Revolutionary Party	1961–1964	45th Congress
1964	Enrique Torres Calderón	Institutional Revolutionary Party	1964–1967	46th Congress
1967	Joaquín del Olmo Martínez	Institutional Revolutionary Party	1967–1970	47th Congress
1970	Rodolfo Martínez Moreno	Institutional Revolutionary Party	1970–1973	48th Congress
1973	Joaquín del Olmo Martínez	Institutional Revolutionary Party	1973–1976	49th Congress
1976	Hugo Díaz Velázquez	Institutional Revolutionary Party	1976–1979	50th Congress
1979	Luz Estela Tirado y Valle; Leobardo Salgado Arroyo	Institutional Revolutionary Party	1979–1982	51st Congress
1982	Joaquín del Olmo Reyes	Institutional Revolutionary Party	1982–1985	52nd Congress
1985	Alfonso Godínez López	Institutional Revolutionary Party	1985–1988	53rd Congress
1988	Claudia Esqueda Llanes	Institutional Revolutionary Party	1988–1991	54th Congress
1991	Alfonso Godínez y López	Institutional Revolutionary Party	1991–1994	55th Congress
1994	Armando Gamboa Enríquez	Institutional Revolutionary Party	1994–1997	56th Congress
1997	Ángel de la Rosa Blancas	Party of the Democratic Revolution	1997–2000	57th Congress
2000	Raúl García Velázquez	National Action Party (Mexico)	2000–2003	58th Congress
2003	Horacio Martínez Meza	Party of the Democratic Revolution	2003–2006	59th Congress
2006	David Mendoza Arellano	Party of the Democratic Revolution	2006–2009	60th Congress
2009	Eduardo Mendoza Arellano	Party of the Democratic Revolution	2009–2012	61st Congress
2012	Karen Quiroga Anguiano	Party of the Democratic Revolution	2012–2015	62nd Congress
2015	Arturo Santana Alfaro	Party of the Democratic Revolution	2015–2018	63rd Congress
2018	Ana María Rodríguez Ruiz	National Regeneration Movement	2018–2021	64th Congress
2021	Marcelino Castañeda Navarrete	Institutional Revolutionary Party	2021–2024	65th Congress
2024	Gabriel García Hernández	National Regeneration Movement	2024–2027	66th Congress

== Presidential elections ==
Mexico City's 18th district
Election	District won by	Party or coalition	%
2018	Andrés Manuel López Obrador	Juntos Haremos Historia	58.3344
2024	Claudia Sheinbaum Pardo	Sigamos Haciendo Historia	61.8361
