= Araceli Saucedo Reyes =

Mexican politician

Araceli Saucedo Reyes (born 8 January 1980) is a Mexican politician who has served in both chambers of Congress. Previously affiliated with the Party of the Democratic Revolution (PRD), she joined the ranks of the National Regeneration Movement (Morena) in the Senate on 28 August 2024.

== Career ==
Saucedo Reyes was born in Opopeo, Michoacán, in 1980. She holds a bachelor's degree in law and social science from the Universidad Michoacana de San Nicolás de Hidalgo and studied for a master's in public administration and e-government at the Virtual University of the State of Michoacán.

In the 2012 general election she was elected to the Chamber of Deputies on the PRD ticket as the alternate of Antonio García Conejo in Michoacán's 11th district; however, she never occupied the seat. In the 2015 mid-terms she was elected to Congress in her own right for that seat on behalf of the PRD. She also served a term in the Congress of Michoacán from 2018 to 2021 and was the municipal president of Salvador Escalante, Michoacán, in 2021 to 2024. She was the general secretary of the PRD in Michoacán in 2020 and had contended for the position of the party's national general secretary in 2014.

In the 2024 general election she contended for one of Michoacán's Senate seats representing the Fuerza y Corazón por México coalition between the PRD, the Institutional Revolutionary Party (PRI) and the National Action Party (PAN). The coalition placed second in the state and Saucedo Reyes was awarded the state's third seat in the Senate.

Days before the 66th congressional session was about to begin, however, she and José Sabino Herrera Dagdug, senator-elect for Tabasco, announced their defection from the PRD to the ruling National Regeneration Movement (Morena) party. The move left Morena and its allies one seat short of controlling supermajorities in both chambers of Congress.

The defections were decried by PRD President Jesús Zambrano, who said they were a decisive step towards the death of democracy in Mexico. Marko Cortés, the president of the National Action Party, noted that Saucedo had received more votes from the PAN than from the PRD and said that her name should be inscribed on the national wall of shame.
