= Adriana Diaz =

Adriana Diaz may refer to:

- Adriana Diaz (journalist) (born 1984), American beauty queen from New York
- Adriana Díaz (table tennis) (born 2000), Puerto Rican table tennis player
- Adriana Díaz Contreras (born 1970), Mexican politician
