= Horacio Martínez Meza =

Mexican politician

- Born: 15 May 1972 (age 54); Iztapalapa, Mexico City, Mexico
- Occupation: Politician
- Political party: PRD

Horacio Martínez Meza (born 15 May 1972) is a Mexican politician affiliated with the Party of the Democratic Revolution (PRD). In 2003–2006 he served as a federal deputy in the 59th Congress, representing the Federal District's eighteenth district for the PRD.
