= José Sabino Herrera Dagdug =

Mexican politician

José Sabino Herrera Dagdug (born 21 June 1980) is a Mexican politician from the state of Tabasco. Previously affiliated with the Party of the Democratic Revolution (PRD), as a senator-elect for his home state he joined the ranks of the National Regeneration Movement (Morena) on 28 August 2024.

== Career ==
Herrera Dagdug was born into a cattle-raising family in Huimanguillo, Tabasco, in 1980. He is a graduate in veterinary medicine. He served in the Congress of Tabasco from 2013 to 2015, and was municipal president of Huimanguillo in 2016–2018.

In the 2024 general election he contended for one of Tabasco's Senate seats representing the Fuerza y Corazón por México coalition between the PRD, the Institutional Revolutionary Party (PRI) and the National Action Party (PAN). The coalition placed second in the state and Herrera Dagdug was awarded the state's third seat in the Senate.

Days before the 66th congressional session was about to begin, however, he and Araceli Saucedo Reyes, senator-elect for Michoacán, announced their defection from the PRD to the ruling National Regeneration Movement (Morena) party. The move left Morena and its allies one seat short of controlling supermajorities in both chambers of Congress.

The defections were decried by PRD President Jesús Zambrano, who said they were a decisive step towards the death of democracy in Mexico. Marko Cortés, the president of the National Action Party, said that the two senators had "betrayed millions of Mexicans who voted to defend the country" and that their names should be inscribed on the national wall of shame.
