= Alfaro =

Alfaro may refer to:

== People ==
- Alfaro (surname), including a list of people with the name

== Places ==
- Alfaro, La Rioja, Spain
- Alfaro, Quito, Ecuador
- Alfaro Ruiz, former name of Zarcero (canton), Alajuela province, Costa Rica

== Other uses ==
- Alfaro (fish), a genus of poeciliid fishes
- CD Alfaro, a football club based in Alfaro, La Rioja, Spain
