= Eduardo Mendoza Arellano =

Mexican politician

- Born: 21 August 1971 (age 54); Mexico City, Mexico
- Occupation: Politician
- Political party: PRD

Eduardo Mendoza Arellano (born 21 August 1971) is a Mexican politician from the Party of the Democratic Revolution (PRD). From 2009 to 2012 he served as a federal deputy in the 61st Congress, representing the Federal District's eighteenth district for the PRD.
