= Zambrano =

Zambrano is a surname of Spanish and also Basque origin.

== Notable Zambranos ==
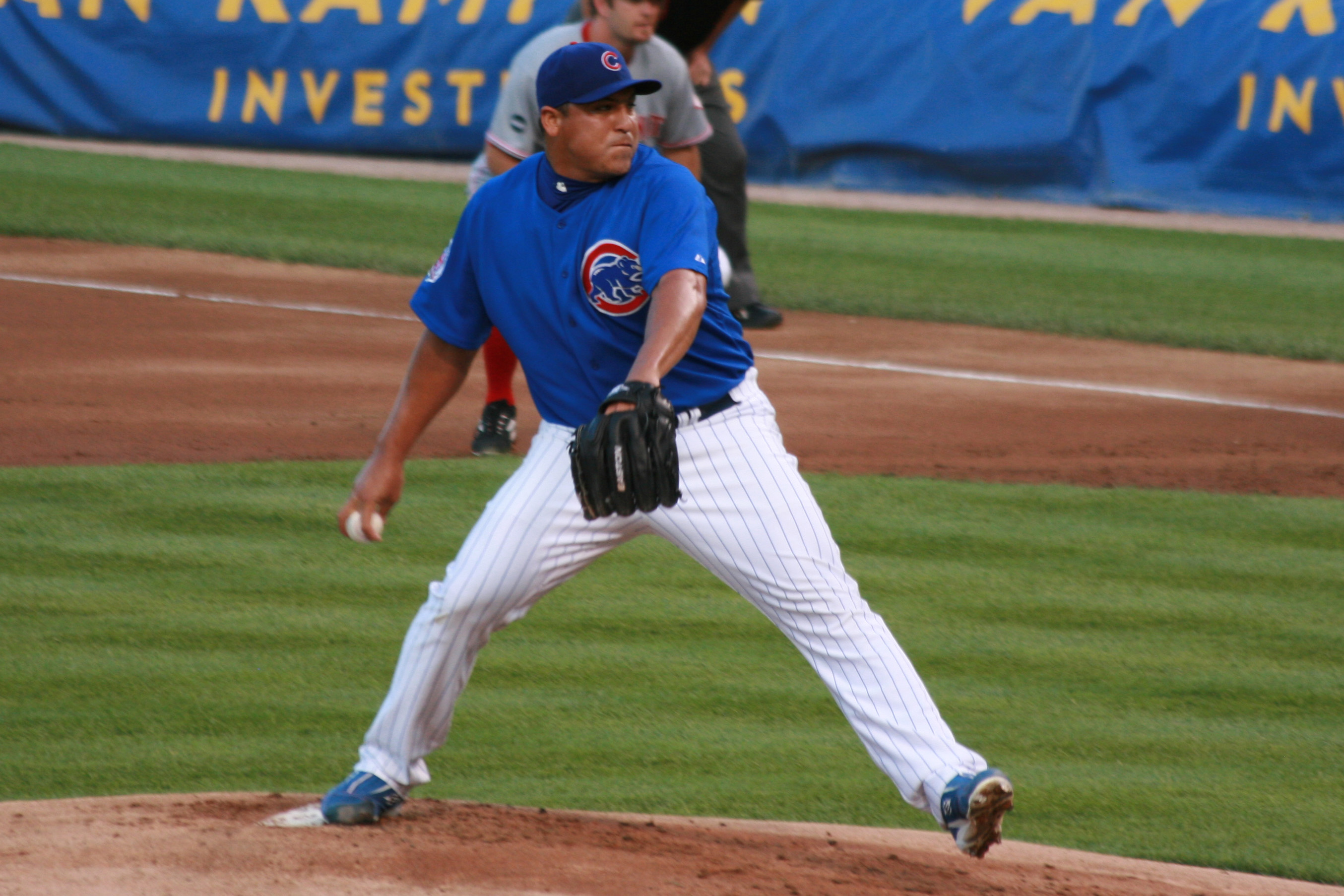
Carlos Zambrano pitched in Major League Baseball from 2001 to 2012.

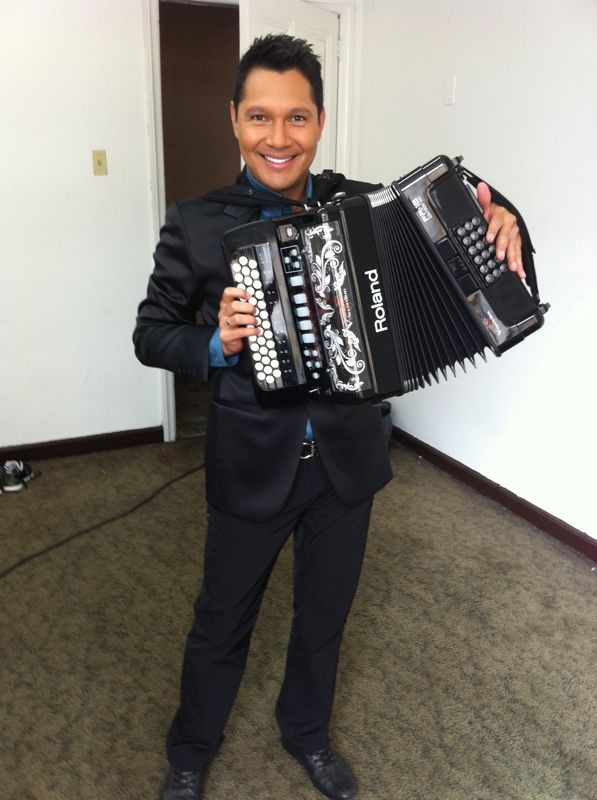
Jimmy Zambrano is a Colombian accordion player of Vallenato music.

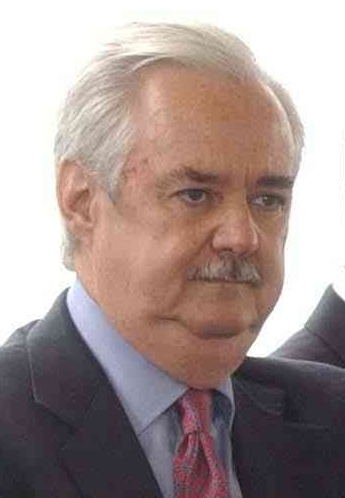
Lorenzo Zambrano was CEO of Cemex from 1985 to 2014.

- Alejandro Zambrano (born 1991), Spanish football midfielder
- Alonso de Llera Zambrano (fl. 1610–1639), Spanish painter, active during Baroque period
- Anthony Zambrano (born 1998), Colombian sprinter
- Aura Zambrano (born 1981), Venezuelan beauty pageant winner
- Benito Zambrano (born 1965), Spanish screenwriter and film director
- Carlos Zambrano (disambiguation), multiple uses, including:
  - Carlos Zambrano (born 1981), Venezuelan baseball pitcher
  - Carlos Zambrano (boxer) (born 1984), Peruvian boxer
  - Carlos Zambrano (footballer) (born 1989), Peruvian football midfielder
- Cesar Zambrano (born 1984), American soccer midfielder
- David De La Mora Zambrano (born 1989), Mexican bantamweight boxer
- Edgar Zambrano (born 1955), Venezuelan politician
- Eduardo Zambrano (born 1966), Venezuelan baseball right fielder and first baseman
- Esperanza Zambrano (1901–1992), Mexican poet
- Fernando Zambrano (born 1949), Spanish footballer
- Henry Zambrano (born 1973), Colombian footballer
- Hjalmar Zambrano (born 1971), Ecuadorian footballer
- Jessus Zambrano (born 1989), Venezuelan model and actor
- Jesús Zambrano Grijalva (born 1953), Mexican politician
- Jimmy Zambrano (born 1968), Colombian accordionist and multi-instrumentalist
- Jorge Luis Zambrano (1981–2020), Ecuadorian drug trafficker
- Josmar Zambrano (born 1992), Venezuelan footballer
- Juan Gabriel Concepción Zambrano (born 1972), Spanish track and field athlete
- Juan José, Conde de Zambrano, (1750–1816) mine owner in Durango, Mexico, and builder of the Palacio de Zambrano
- Lorenzo Zambrano (1945–2014), Mexican business executive and philanthropist
- Manolo Zambrano (born 1960), Spanish football midfielder, and manager
- María Zambrano (1904–1991), Spanish essayist, philosopher and academic
- Mateo de Toro Zambrano, 1st Count of La Conquista (1727–1811), Spanish military leader in Colonial Chile
- Merly Zambrano (born 1981), Ecuadorian footballer
- Miguel Zambrano (born 1951), Peruvian wrestler
- Octavio Zambrano (born 1958), Ecuadorian football (soccer) coach
- Raúl Zambrano (born 1969), Mexican guitarist
- Renzo Zambrano (born 1994), Venezuelan footballer
- Richard Zambrano (born 1967), Chilean footballer
- Roddy Zambrano (born 1978), Ecuadorian professional football referee
- Víctor Zambrano (born 1975), Venezuelan baseball player
- Vicente Paúl Ambrosi Zambrano (born 1980), Ecuadorian footballer
- Yamila Zambrano (born 1986), Cuban judoka

=== Fictional characters ===
- Kim Zambrano, paramedic played by Kim Raver on American television series Third Watch
- The Zambrano crime family in Venezuela, from J.J. Connolly's Viva La Madness
