= Alejandra Barrales =

Mexican politician

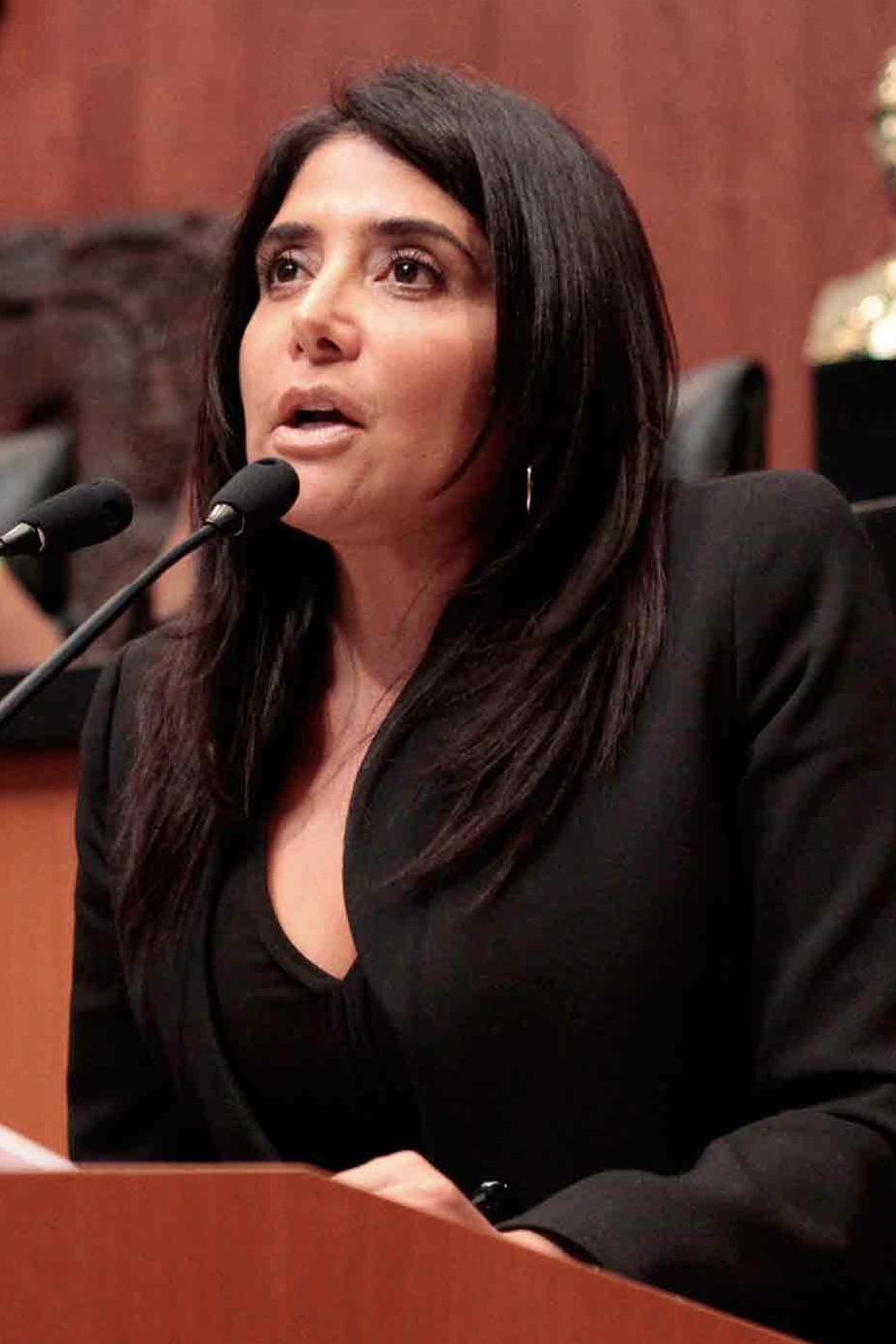
- Barrales in 2014

Personal details
- Born: María Alejandra Barrales Magdaleno; 17 July 1967 (age 59) Mexico City, Mexico
- Party: Democratic Revolution (2002-2019); Citizen's Movement (2019-present)
- Spouse: Julio César Nicholson Fuentes (1992-2008)
- Children: 1
- Education: Universidad Mexicana; Institute of Public Administration
- Occupation: Political party president

María Alejandra Barrales Magdaleno (born 17 July 1967) is a Mexican lawyer and politician and the former president of the Party of the Democratic Revolution. She formerly represented the Federal District (later, Mexico City) in the Senate (62nd and 63rd Legislatures) and also served as a federal deputy and in the Legislative Assembly of the Federal District. In 2019, after a period of relative political inactivity, Barrales announced her resignation from the Party of the Democratic Revolution (PRD) alongside Senator Juan Zepeda of the State of Mexico. On February 19, 2024, it was officially announced that she would be a candidate for her former seat in the Senate of the Republic, representing the Citizens' Movement (Mexico) party.

== Early life and education ==
Alejandra Barrales was born 17 July 1967 in Mexico City and grew up in Michoacán. Both of her parents worked, her father as a bus driver, thus she was frequently responsible for caring for her two younger siblings. From 1982 to 1985, she studied to be an executive assistant at the National College of Professional Technical Education. She then went on to earn degrees in Public Administration from the University of the Cloister of Sor Juana and Human Resources Administration from the Mexico Autonomous Institute of Technology, as well as a Master's in Public Administration from the National Institute of Public Administration (INAP) and a law license from the Mexican University (UNIMEX). Her Master's thesis was called "The professionalization of legislative bodies: The case of the Federal District Legislative Assembly" ("La profesionalización de los órganos legislativos. El caso de la Asamblea Legislativa del DF”)

== Career ==
Her early career took place in the aviation industry. She was a head flight attendant for Aeroméxico between 1998 and 2000 and served in the sector's labor union, the Asociación Sindical de Sobrecargos de Aviación (ASSA). She was its press secretary from 1989 to 1991 and its secretary general from 1995 to 2001. She led Aeroméxico's flight attendants on strike in 1998 and again in 2001. She also helped to found the National Workers' Union in 1997 and was the secretary general of the Federation of Unions of Businesses of Goods and Services (FESEBS) from 1997 to 2000.

After 2001, Barrales shifted gears and moved into politics.

The Party of the Democratic Revolution (PRD) placed her on their party list of proportional representation federal deputies for the 58th Legislature, which met between 2000 and 2003 and where she served as a secretary on the Labor and Social Welfare Commission. Barrales fully joined the PRD in 2002, the same year she briefly served as a social welfare coordinator in the government of Michoacán. In 2003, voters sent Barrales to the III Legislature of the Legislative Assembly of the Federal District (ALDF). She was the PRD faction's spokeswoman in the legislature and sat on five commissions including Government, Public Security, Political-Electoral Matters, Sports, and Administration Committee.

After her 2006 campaign to head the delegation of Benito Juárez failed, the PRD placed her in the Mexico City government as the secretary of tourism. Two years later, she was tapped to head the PRD in the Federal District and resigned her position as tourism secretary. Also at this time, in 2007, Barrales obtained her law degree from the Universidad Mexicana.

From 2009 to 2012, Barrales returned to the ALDF in its V Legislature and was the PRD's parliamentary coordinator in that legislature; she also presided over the Government Commission. While she was in the legislature, she created a scholarship program intended to benefit 45,000 youth; instead, El País reported in 2013 that only 2,700 kids had received the scholarship, and 250 million pesos that were in a corresponding trust had disappeared. While she sought to run for mayor of Mexico City in 2012, she eventually pulled out of the internal discussions to clear a path for Miguel Ángel Mancera.

Voters sent Barrales back to the federal legislature, this time as a senator, for the 62nd and 63rd Legislatures, giving her a six-year term between 2012 and 2018. She presided over the Radio and Television Commission and also served on the Guiding Council for the Pacto por México. However, she left the Senate in August 2015 when she was tapped to become the education secretary of Mexico City; her alternate, Martha Angélica Tagle Martínez, took her seat in the Senate.

On 15 July 2016, Barrales resigned from the Mexico City government; the next day, the PRD elected Barrales as its new president, replacing Agustín Basave Benítez, who had resigned the month before. She will filled out Basave's term, which ran until 2017.

In 2018, she ran for the Head of Government of Mexico City as the candidate for Por México al Frente but lost to Claudia Sheinbaum. Following the election, Barrales kept a low profile until 2019, when she and Senator Juan Zepeda left the PRD. In 2020, she announced she would be taking a sabbatical in Miami, United States, to reassess whether she wanted to return to politics in Mexico City.

Barrales sought election as one of Mexico City's senators in the 2024 Senate election, taking the first place on the Citizens' Movement's two-name formula alongside Sandra Cuevas. In that contest, however, MC placed a distant third behind the Sigamos Haciendo Historia and Fuerza y Corazón por México coalitions.

== Personal life ==
Barrales married Julio César Nicholson Fuentes in 1992; they divorced in 2008. She has one biological daughter, Máxima. She also raises her niece Estefanía, of whom she obtained custody when her brother Esteban divorced.

In 2006, the men's magazine Revista H para Hombres named Barrales "one of the sexiest politicians in Mexico".
