= Lucila Villaseñor Grijalva =

American muralist

Lucila Villaseñor Grijalva is a Chicana muralist who was born in Los Angeles, California. Her art style is inspired by graffiti art.

== Background ==
Lucila Villaseñor Grijalva was born in Los Angeles, California. She was in a Mexican Catholic household in the Maravilla Housing Projects neighborhood. In 1953, after graduating from Sacred Heart High School in Lincoln Heights, she started a year-long art apprenticeship with Fred Giglioli, an Italian American artist. In 1961, se earned an associate degree from East Los Angeles City College. She attended the Otis Art Institute with other prominent Chicanx artists such as Carlos Almaraz and Judithe Hernandez. Eventually, she earned a bachelor's degree from California State University, Fullerton. Throughout her academic education pursuits, Villaseñor Grijalva was married and raising a family. At first, she studied art, then decided to pursue art education and eventually, she decided to be a social worker and a public artist.

== Art ==
Villaseñor Grijalva's art work is inspired by the gang-affiliated imagery in urban graffiti art, showing the connection between muralism and graffiti. In particular, placas, which are textual works or tags aiming to code name individuals or groups or neighborhood affiliations. She became interested in the graffiti art of Little Valley, an East Los Angeles gang, and asked permission to attend their meetings to gain more insight into the art practice and authenticate her own interpretation. Though she initially perceived placas as “terrible” and “destructive,” her personal research focused on understanding this element as an immortalizing practice. She was interested in the way this stylistic element honored Chicanx people's desire to be immortalized. Her work with this style has been compared to that of Willie Herrón and Chaz Bojorquez, who are both well-known Chicano muralists that popularized “cholo-style” graffiti art.

Villaseñor Grijalva's artistic career is notably associated with her work at the Mechicano Art Center, which was one of the first Chicanx art collectives in Los Angeles. She worked at the East Los Angeles location and continued when the center moved to Highland Park in 1975. She held her own solo exhibition in 1976. During this time, she collaborated with many popular Chicana artists, including Isabel M. Castro, Sonya Fe, Judithe Hernández, and Susan Saenz. While working with the center, she participated in a bus bench art contest in 1972, and won one second place alongside Ray Atilano. The goal of the project was to beautify the community and required the participating artists to create designs for the fronts and backs of various bus benches along major bus route streets. Grijalva also painted one of the wall panels of the center, which demonstrated her graffiti-inspired artistic style.

Besides working with the Mechicano Art Center, she also painted a mural for La Casa de la Esperanza, which showcased her incorporation of placas. She got this opportunity after collaborating with Little Valley, therefore dedicated the mural to acknowledging the prevalence of violence in the L.A. projects. Many years after the center closed, she participated as a public artist in L.A. Xicano, a group of five exhibitions that highlighted the work and impact of Los Angeles visual artists of Mexican-descent. Specifically, Villaseñor Grijalva showed her work at the exhibition entitled Mapping Another L.A.:The Chicano Art Movement, which was held at the Fowler Museum in UCLA from October 2011 to February 2012. The exhibition sought to highlight how different Chicanx art groups from the 1960s and 1970s reimagined the landscape and culture of Los Angeles, especially its intersection of Mexican, Chicanx, and American culture. This project was a part of an even bigger institutional collaboration entitled Pacific Standard Time: Art in L.A. 1945-1980, which was initiated by the J. Paul Getty Museum and illuminated the interconnection between groups and people that helped form the current state of L.A. art. Overall, she was interested in promoting a sense of community through her public art.
