= Carlos Zambrano (disambiguation) =

Carlos Zambrano (born 1981) is a Venezuelan former Major League Baseball pitcher.

Carlos Zambrano may also refer to:

- Carlos Zambrano (boxer) (born 1984), Peruvian boxer
- Carlos Zambrano (footballer) (born 1989), Peruvian centre-back
- Carlos Contreras Zambrano (born 1995), Chilean footballer

== See also ==
- Zambrano (surname)
