= Héctor Barraza Chávez =

Mexican politician

- Born: 11 June 1961 (age 64); Chihuahua, Mexico
- Occupation: Politician
- Political party: PRD

Héctor Elías Barraza Chávez (born 11 June 1961) is a Mexican politician from the Party of the Democratic Revolution. From 2011 to 2012 he served as Deputy of the LXI Legislature of the Mexican Congress representing Sonora.
