= Raúl García Velázquez =

Mexican politician (1946–2009)

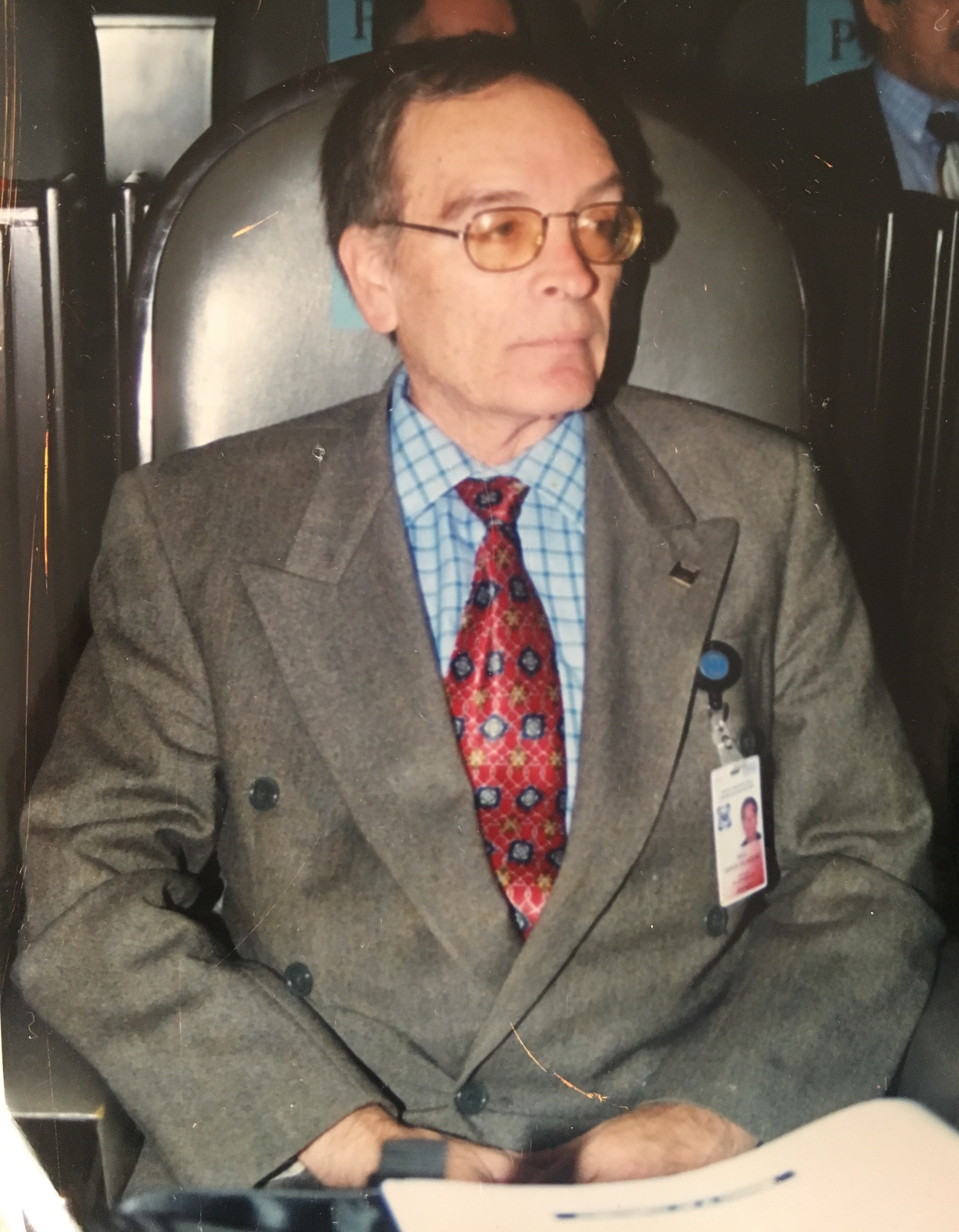
- Born: 22 August 1946; Mexico City, Mexico
- Died: 4 December 2009, aged 63; Mexico City, Mexico
- Education: Degree in law, Universidad Nacional Autónoma de México
- Occupation: Politician
- Title: Mr.
- Political party: PAN

Raúl García Velázquez (22 August 1946 – 4 December 2009) was a Mexican politician from the National Action Party (PAN). In 1995 he joined the ranks of the National Action Party as an active member. On 2 July 2000, he won the elections to serve as the a federal deputy for the Federal District's 18th district in Iztapalapa. From 2000 to 2003 he represented that district in the 58th Congress. He was a member of the Federal District Commissions and also of Radio, Television and Cinematography.
