= Confianza =

Latin American form of mutual reciprocity

Confianza (English: trust) is a Latin American form of mutual reciprocity. In the context of interpersonal relationships, its presence indicates that both parties recognize a mutual duty to honor their relationship by extending specially favorable treatment.

== Cross-cultural theory ==
Some cross-cultural theorists state that many European and North American cultures are based on universal expectations of individual conduct. "I cannot hire my relatives to work in a public institution in my care, and, in theory, even my friends I should treat equally to strangers." Social obligations are dictated on the basis of norms or rules which are considered of a higher order, transcending the "accidents" of relationship, such as personal acquaintance, shared origin or family ties between people. "If I am an electrical repairperson, I must service my list of clients in the order received because doing so is fair. If I am a police officer, I give my acquaintances tickets because I am a police officer and that's my job."

== Ties that bind ==
Many people in the traditional Latin culture are particularist in that the most important factor influencing what individuals can do is whose trust they have gained either through conduct or through affinity networks. In the Dominican Republic, for instance, if I know a police officer, and I "tengo confianza" in him, then I may be able to have fewer problems with the law. "Todo se hace por la buena confianza y relaciones que uno las tiene con otros," or "Everything gets done based on the trust and good relationships one has with others." If the electricity goes out, it is helpful to know someone at the power company. Social obligations are dictated based on social relationships with others. "I do helpful things for my friends because friendship makes life great." Everyone needs a bit of help sometimes, after all.

== Breach of trust ==
"Confianza" (mixture of familiarity and trust) is especially evident in the phrase "abuso de confianza" (abuse of trust), which is the presumption of a relationship beyond the expectation of the other person. It is another of network of subtle, implicit, unstated relational expectations characteristic of the Latin cultures. Another one is the invisible bond between patron, padrino or caudillo and their protégés, ahijados or followers, a vestigial form of the liege that serfs owed the feudal lords and their reciprocal obligation to take care of their vassals, especially in times of need.
