= Fernando Belaunzarán =

Mexican politician

Fernando Belaunzarán Méndez
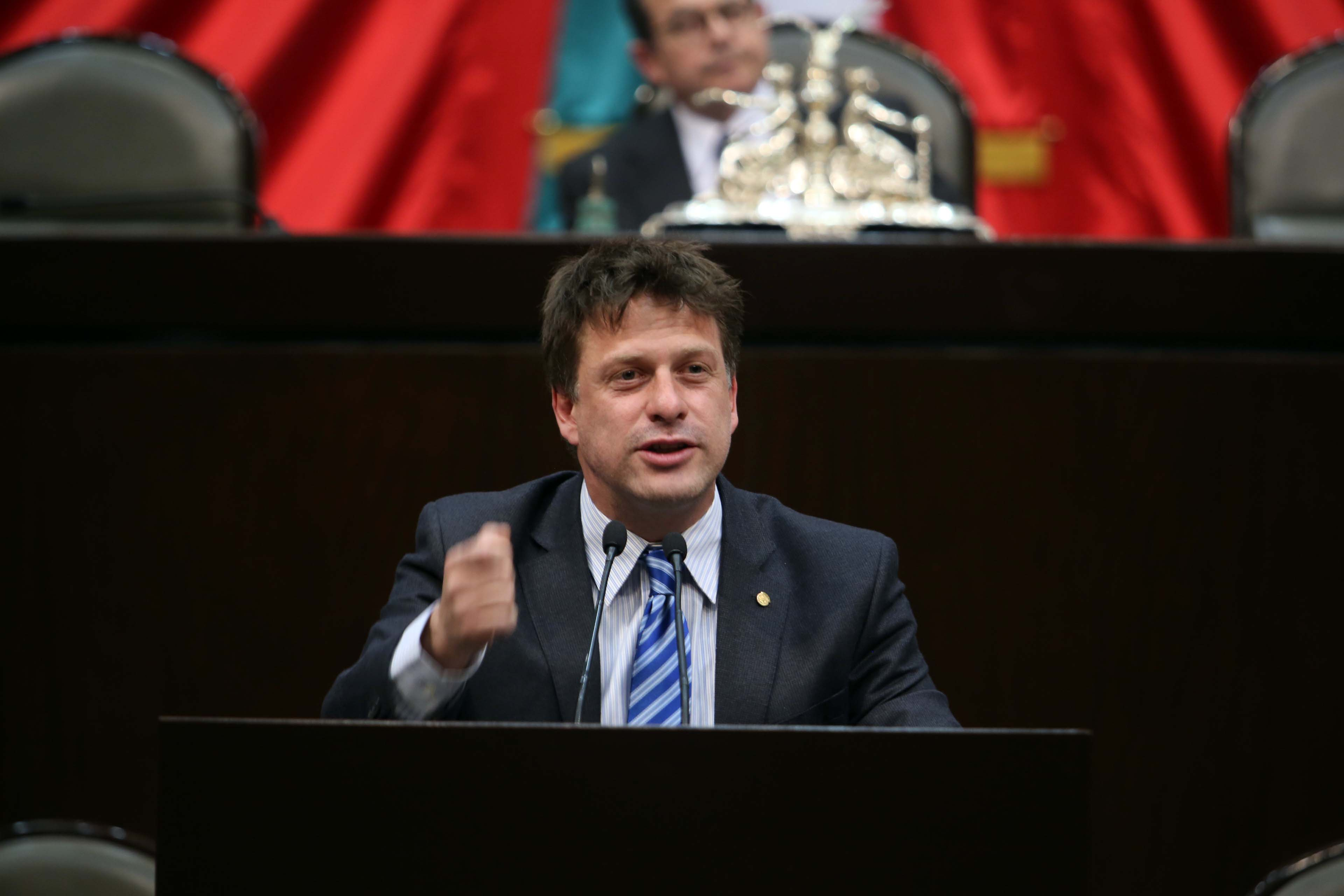
- Fernando Belaunzarán Méndez
- Born: 3 January 1970 (age 56); Coyoacán, Federal District, Mexico
- Occupation: politician
- Political party: PRD

Fernando Belaunzarán Méndez (born 3 January 1970) is a politician affiliated with the PRD. As of 2013 he served as Congressman of the LXII Legislature of the Mexican Congress representing Mexico City.

== UNAM ==
Fernando Belaunzarán Méndez was actively involved in student political and cultural causes during his permanence through the UNAM FFyL, and serve as a college counselor between 1993 and 1995.

He was leader of the "historical trend" (‘moderados') of the University Student Council (CEU). He participated in different political moments of the student community,. He founded in 1994 together with other students, the Caravan Ricardo Pozas which aimed to provide humanitarian aid (food, medicine, tools) to the indigenous communities of Chiapas, which at that time were not only fighting with extreme poverty but with an active armed conflict in the region.

On May 24, 1994, he interpellated the presidential candidate Ernesto Zedillo, amid a controversial visit to the UNAM He also convened the Movement of Excluded Students of Middle and Higher Education which in 1995 succeeded on the admission of more than thousand students that were rejected, by protests, hunger strikes and the storming of Rectory Tower. On April 20, 1999, UNAM students closed the university facilities, In this conflict, Belaunzarán, was not found involved actively since the beginning, but as an advisor. The strike abruptly ended the day the Federal police raided and arrested the UNAM students and eviction of the strikers.

== LXII Legislature ==
LXII Legislature in which Belaunzarán was congressman, was characterized by the adoption of important laws and constitutional reforms, like, Education Reform, National Anti-Corruption System, Energy Reform, Taxes and Telecomm among others, which Belaunzarán vote in favor, and caused discontent among some voters of the Mexican left wing.

== Social Causes ==
Fernando Belaunzarán has been a driving force to promote the debate on drug policy in the country and if necessary, check the legislative agenda. During his tenure in the Mexican Congress House he promoted the legalization of medical and recreational cannabis, both through a bill as well an authorization for the medicinal poppy cultivation (Opium). He also organized the International Forum on Drug Policy, in July 2014, in Mexico City, where international speakers and politicians discussed a change of strategy needed in drug policy. He has been invited to participate in several forums in different countries, including Parlatino in 2014 and 2015.

On the issue of medical cannabis highlights the case of Graciela Elizalde promoted by Belaunzaran towards the end of LXII Legislature. Grace, a small 8 years- old who opened the door to cannabidiol for the treatment of Lennox-Gastaut, suffered multiple epileptic seizures a day. She became the first patient in Mexico with a compound of THC, fulfilling the legal procedure to import the drug in October 2015. It was widely covered by international press.

== Books ==
He has written several articles for different newspapers and four books as well.

- Tiempos Turbulentos. Ensayos en el año del Complot.
- Herejías políticas en momentos decisivos.
- Autor del libro La Guerra de los Herejes.
- Herejía, crítica y parresí o de como conseguir chamba sin salir de tu casa.
