= Jesús Ortega =

Mexican politician (born 1952)

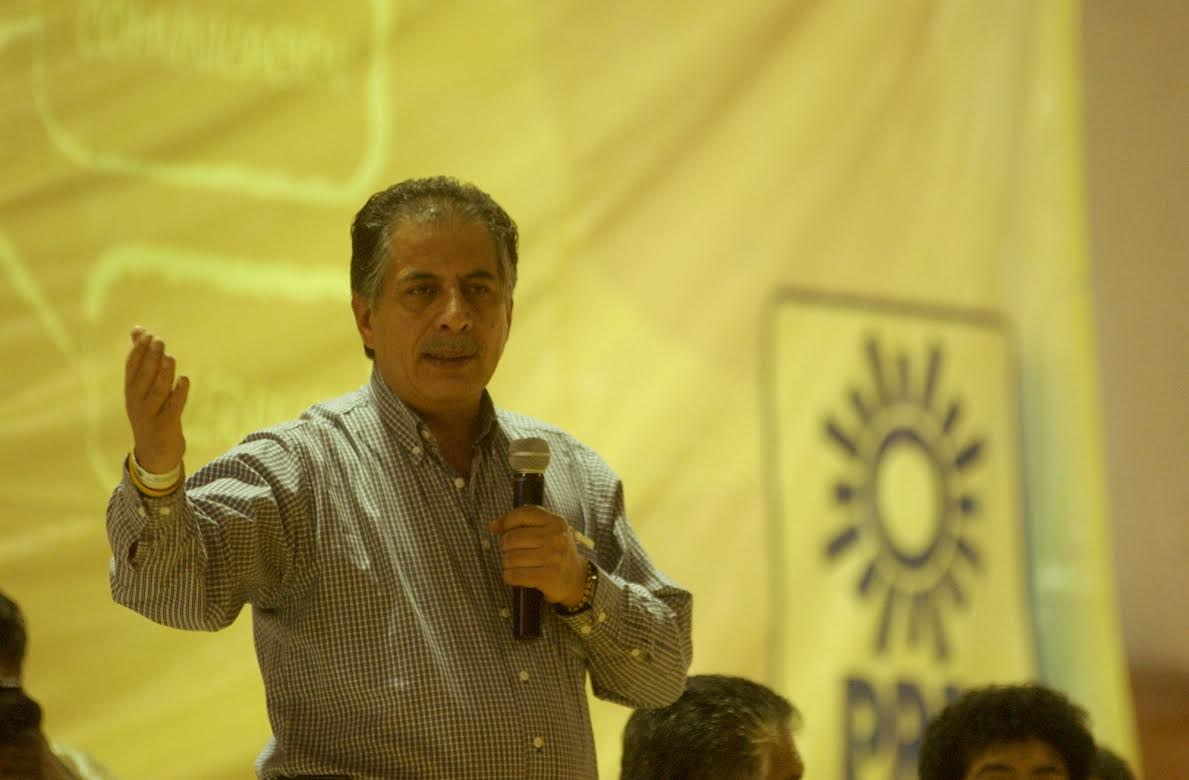
Portrait of Jesús Ortega Martínez

Jesús Ortega Martínez (born November 5, 1952, in Aguascalientes) is a Mexican centre-left politician affiliated with the Party of the Democratic Revolution (PRD). He has served in the lower and upper house of the Mexican Congress. He was elected president of the PRD in 2008. He served as president until he was succeeded by Jesús Zambrano Grijalva in 2011.

== Early life and education ==
Ortega was born on November 5, 1952. He grew up in Aguascalientes and moved to Mexico City to study in the Escuela Nacional de Ciencias Biológicas of the National Polytechnic Institute (IPN).

== Political career ==
He became a member of the now-defunct Workers' Socialist Party (PST), which he represented in the Chamber of Deputies during the LI Legislature (1979–1982). He later joined the Partido Mexicano Socialista (PMS), and served in the Chamber of Deputies from 1988 to 1991 (LIV Legislature)as a member of PMS.

Ortega and his former party, the PMS, supported the candidacy of Cuauhtémoc Cárdenas for the 1988 Mexican presidential election. He became a founding member of the Party of the Democratic Revolution (PRD). As a member of the PRD, he was elected to serve in the Chamber of Deputies during the LVI Legislature.

In 1996, Andrés Manuel López Obrador and Ortega ran for president and general secretary of the PRD, respectively, and won the PRD internal elections. They served in these positions from 1996-1999. In 2000 he won a seat in the upper house of Congress.

Ortega unsuccessfully mounted a campaign to be the PRD's candidate in the 2006 election for Head of Government of the Federal District (Mexico City), losing to Marcelo Ebrard. Polling in 2005 found him to be the third most popular choice for the PRD's nomination, behind Ebrard and Pablo Gómez Álvarez.

In 2008, Ortega ran for the presidency of the PRD, where he faced former Head of Government of the Federal District Alejandro Encinas. The election results were controversial, with both leading candidates accusing each other of fraud. Ortega was described as the moderate candidate in the contest, with Encinas an ally of López Obrador. While a PRD party commission appealed Ortega's victory, the Federal Electoral Tribunal affirmed Ortega's victory over Encinas.

In September 2012, he assumed the position of National Coordinator of Nueva Izquierda, an internal current of the Partido de la Revolución Democrática (Party of the Democratic Revolution).

Party political offices
| Preceded by Guadalupe Acosta Naranjo | President of the Party of the Democratic Revolution; 2008 – 2011 | Succeeded by Jesús Zambrano Grijalva |
