= Carlota Alfaro =

Puerto Rican fashion designer

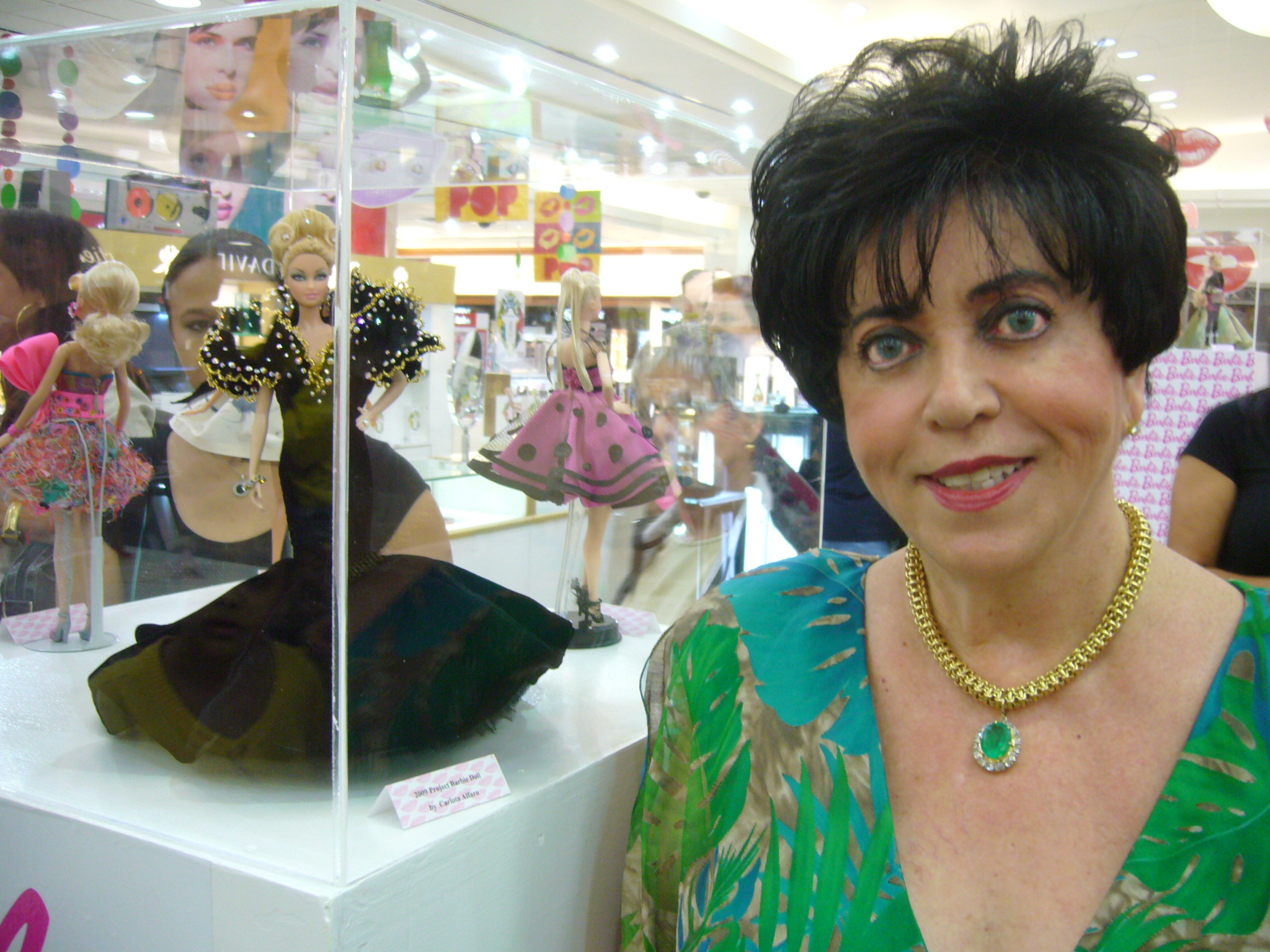
- Alfaro in 2009
- Born: 4 June 1933 (age 92); Santurce, Puerto Rico
- Other names: "Puerto Rico's grande dame of fashion"
- Occupation(s): Fashion designer and writer
- Years active: 1960–present
- Movement: Haute couture

Carlota Alfaro (born June 4, 1933) is a high fashion designer. She is known as "Puerto Rico's grande dame of fashion".

== Biography ==
Alfaro was born in Santurce, Puerto Rico and showed a passion for design ever since she was a child, often designing clothes for family and friends. She was raised in Santurce where her aunt taught her how to sew.

Alfaro reached international fame in Latin America, Europe and the United States during the 1960s, decade in which she also created the Instituto Carlota Alfaro, aimed towards passing on her knowledge to young fashion design students. Alfaro's specialty is haute couture. During the 1980s, she published a series of designs in a local newspaper's fashion column, called Destellos de la moda. Her signature dress is the exaggerated mermaid cut.

Alfaro has received many national awards, and her collections have been sold at local markets around the world, including Neiman Marcus, Bloomingdales and Saks Fifth Avenue.

== See also ==
- List of Puerto Ricans
- History of women in Puerto Rico
