= Gonzalo Abad Grijalva =

Ecuadorian educator

- Born: August 1, 1910; Chone, Manabi Province, Ecuador.
- Died: June 13, 2009 (aged 98)
- Occupation: Ecuadorian educator
- Parent(s): Carlos Abad Piedra and Matilde Grijalva

Academic background
- Education: Central University of Ecuador; Free University of Brussel; Teachers College of Colombia

Academic work
- Discipline: Educator
- Institutions: Ministry of education; UNESCO

Gonzalo Abad Grijalva (August 1, 1910 – June 13, 2009) was an Ecuadorian educator who served as Ecuador's Minister of Education and was a delegate of UNESCO.

== Biography ==
He was born in Chone, Manabí Province, Ecuador, on August 1, 1910. His parents were Carlos Abad Piedra and Matilde Grijalva Macías.

In 1924 he studied at the Juan Montalvo Normal School (high school) in Quito. In 1930 he enrolled at the Central University of Ecuador to become a mathematics and physics teacher. Based on his good grades, the Ecuadorian government awarded him a scholarship to pursue his graduate studies at the Free University of Brussels and then at the Teachers College at Columbia University, New York.

In 1942 he married María Luisa. In 1961 he was appointed the Minister of Education by the government of Carlos Julio Arosemena Monroy (in office: 1961–1963). In 1963 he received the Order of Merit (Grand Cross) from the Ecuadorian government. In 1972 he replaced Oswaldo Guayasamín as the President of the House of Ecuadorian Culture, after Guayasamín had a disagreement with General Vicente Anda Aguirre, the minister of education during the dictatorship of Guillermo Rodríguez Lara (in office: 1972–1976). He resigned from the post after 6 months due to the lack of funds necessary to accomplish many projects. In 1976 he married Jeannine Rouseau Contaud.

He was the Ambassador of Ecuador to Paris from 1979 to 1983, appointed by the administration of President Jaime Roldós Aguilera (in office: 1979–1981).

He died on June 13, 2009.
