= Alfaro, Quito =

Coordinates: 0°13′58.7″S 78°30′53.9″W

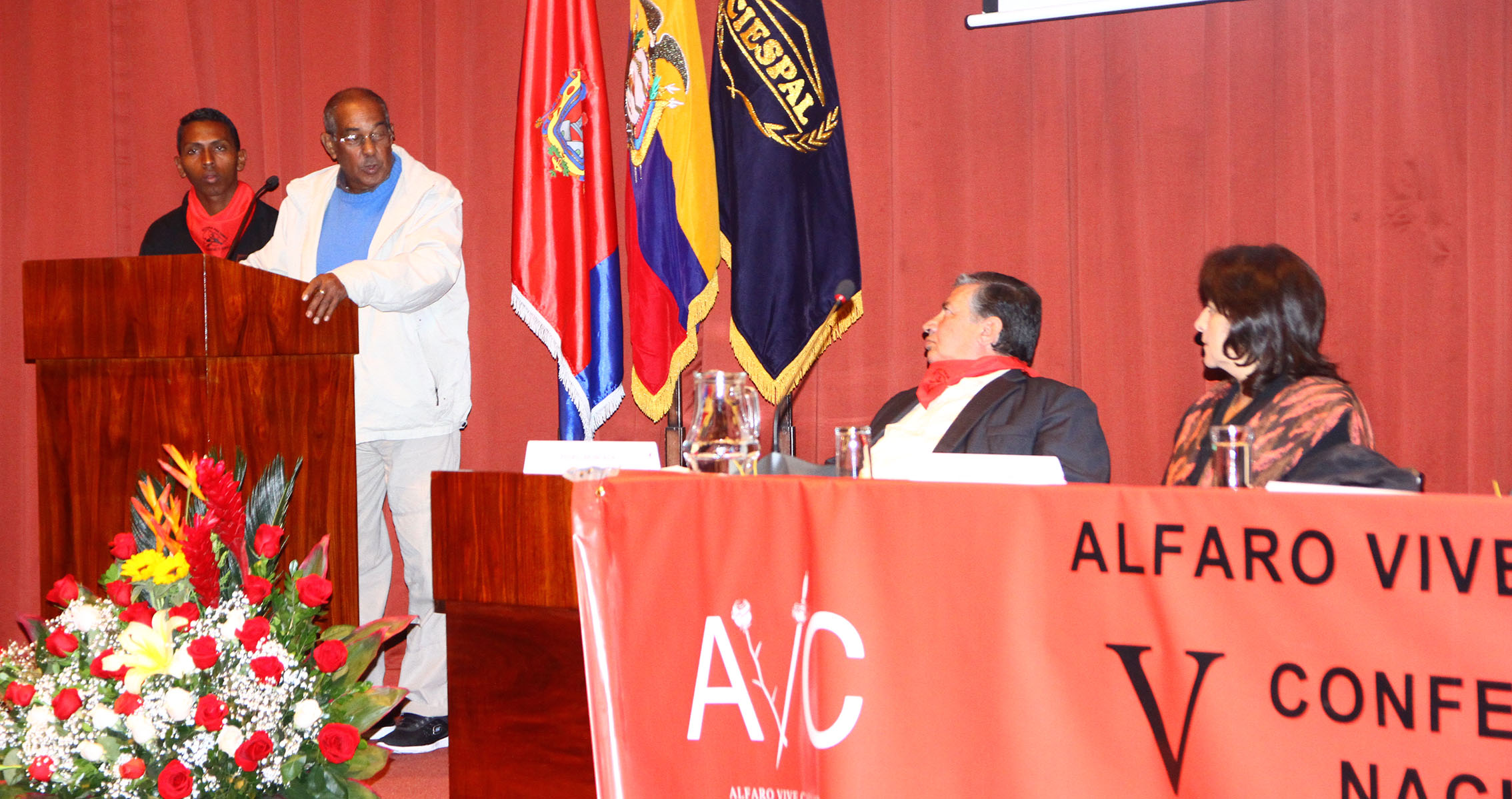

Alfaro is an electoral urban parish or district of Quito, Ecuador. The parish was established as a result of the October 2004 political elections, when the city was divided into 19 electoral urban parishes.
