= Fabián Alfaro =

Chilean footballer (born 1981)

Personal information
- Full name: Fabián Mauricio Alfaro Pérez
- Date of birth: September 23, 1981 (age 45)
- Place of birth: Copiapó, Chile
- Height: 1.75 m (5 ft 9 in)
- Position: Defender

Senior career*
Years	Team	Apps	(Gls)
2005–2007	Deportes Copiapó	64	(2)
2008	Cobresal	6	(0)
2009	San Marcos de Arica	11	(0)
2009–2011	Deportes Copiapó	65	(2)
Total		146	(4)
- * Club domestic league appearances and goals

Fabián Mauricio Alfaro Pérez (born September 23, 1981, in Copiapó) is a Chilean footballer who plays for Deportes Copiapó of the Primera B Chilena.
