= Sonya Fe =

American painter

- Born: 1952 (age 73–74)
- Education: Art Center College of Design
- Known for: Painting

Sonya Fe (born 1952) is a Chicana painter born and raised in Los Angeles.

== Biography ==
Fe is one of eight children born to Jewish-American mother Ruth Goldfein and father Joseph Williams who was Narragansett and Mexican-American. During her childhood she lived in the William Mead Housing Project in Downtown Los Angeles. As a young person, she witnessed and was visually influenced by the Chicano art movement.

Sonya always had full support from her parents to pursue art, along with her seven siblings. She would go out with her father and was encouraged to draw whatever interested her the most, this became how Sonya would learn how to paint. At the young age of 13, Sonya Fe received her first art scholarship to attend Otis Art Institute in Los Angeles. She received her BA degree from the Art Center College of Design in Pasadena, California in 1976. After her time at the Art Center she was able to walk away with new techniques in how to mix colors and how to turn art into a career. However, Sonya claims that she was not able to learn how to paint in school, instead, Sonya taught herself how to paint simply by experimenting with paint in any way she could. She was not concerned with the final product of her paintings in the beginning because her goal was to learn the craft and how to express her thoughts and feelings in each painting.

She now lives in Elk Grove in Sacramento County, and is married to Arturo Vasquez, a children’s book author and they have a son who is a graphic designer.

== Art ==
Fe's work often makes use of wax, oil, and earth tones, and they reflect social and cultural issues with themes centering on child abuse/neglect and the woman's place in society. Fe admits "The figures themselves are not anatomically correct-some have little definition. However, the faces are very defined, making the face the center of attention. My main concern is clearly with the relationships among these women's varying physical presence and at the same time bringing into equilibrium the active lines, and the colors that define them."

As a Hispanic American artist, Fe's work reflects issues and inequalities in gender, race, and human thought. “Chicana artist Sonya Fe paints for women. She paints for children. She paints for those who bear the weight of the world without being seen.” Her work has been featured in magazines such as Forbe's Sunstorm Magazine, Sacramento Magazine, and Sixteen Magazine. Pat Villeneuve describes her paintings as "relatively large....and are done in wax and oil" and her drawings as "done in colored pencil and other media, [and] are more personal representations..."

Fe illustrated a children’s book titled You Can Draw Too, published by Publishing Children’s Stories, a press she co-founded. In 1998, she received the national Artist Award from the California State Senate.

Fe's work has been exhibited nationally and are in the collections Carnegie Art Museum, the Cheech Marin Collection, and the Smithsonian Institution. In Los Angeles, she worked with other artists to restore the Great Wall of Los Angeles.

The most known Sonya Fe exhibit is called “Are You With Me?” being shown from October 16, 2021- May 29, 2022 which included 27 oil paintings and 18 mixed-media drawings. The exhibition sought to be a biographical depiction of her own life as well as depicting images of women’s roles decided by society as well as children’s innocence. The exhibition catalog includes the Sonya Fe quote explaining her exhibit, “I want the viewer to stand with me while looking at the world. I want them to feel, see, and understand what I am saying- to not be left behind. I want to ask them, ‘Are you with me?’” The exhibit “Are You With Me?” was curated by Norma Chairez-Hartell, and embarked on a national tour after it was shown at the Riverside Art Museum.

Prior to her “Are you with me?” exhibition she made her mark throughout California, across the nation and even into Mexico and Japan. Her art had first been shown in museums and galleries in California in an exhibition that started at the Las Cruces Museum of Art by Nrma Chairez-Hartell from May 7, 2021 to July 24, 2021 in addition to a solo exhibition at the Morris Grave Museum.

In an interview with PBS, Sonya Fe shares what initially drew her to the world of art and what continues to inspire her contributions to Chicano culture. She expresses her love for painting with raw emotion, allowing the audience to interpret her work through their own experiences. Fe has played a significant role in increasing the visibility of Chicano art and strongly believes in the movement that Chicano artists are building.

== Collections ==
- National Museum of Mexican Art, Chicago, IL
- Museo Del Barrio, New York, NY
- Carnegie Museum, Oxnard, CA
- Morris Graves Museum, Eureka, CA
- Museum of Contemporary Hispanic Art, New York, NY
- San Diego Art Museum, San Diego, CA
- Smithsonian Museum, Washington D.C.
