= Eduardo Mendoza (footballer) =

Mexican footballer (born 1993)

Eduardo Mendoza Herrera (born 19 May 1993 in Lázaro Cárdenas, Michoacán) is a Mexican professional footballer who plays in the forward position. He is currently on loan at Correcaminos UAT of the Ascenso MX division, from Monarcas Morelia.
