= Karen Quiroga Anguiano =

Mexican politician

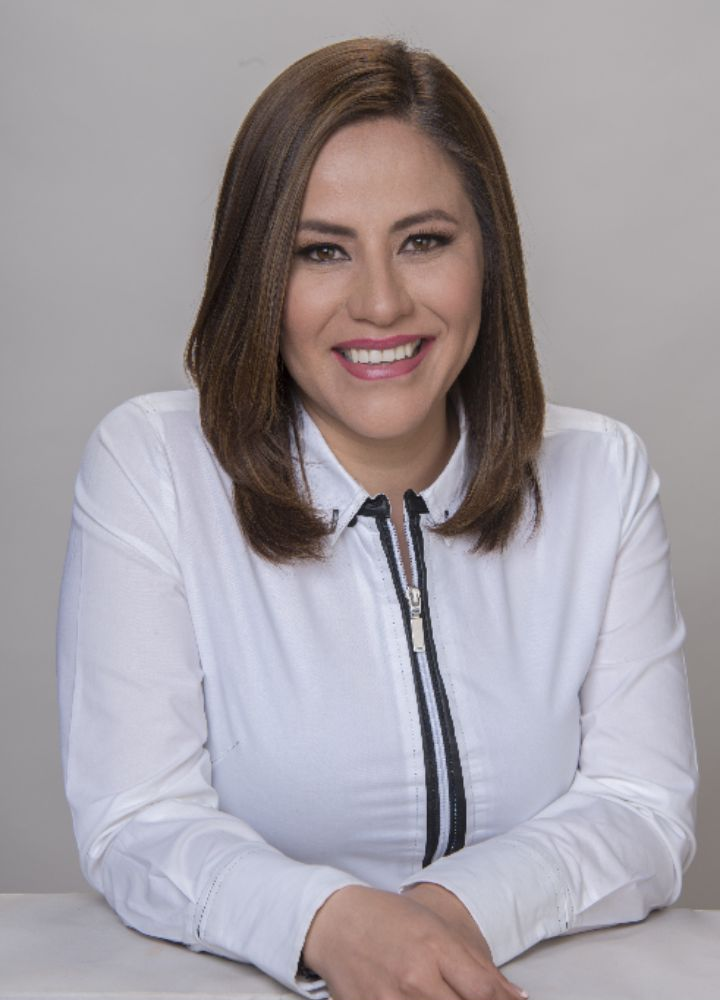
- Born: 19 January 1980 (age 46); Iztapalapa, Federal District, Mexico
- Occupation: Deputy
- Political party: PRD

Karen Quiroga Anguiano (born 19 January 1980) is a Mexican politician affiliated with the PRD. In 2012–2015 she served as a federal deputy in the 62nd Congress, representing the Federal District's eighteenth district for the PRD.
