= Adriana Díaz Contreras =

Mexican politician

- Born: 1 March 1970 (age 56); Morelos, Mexico
- Occupation: Politician
- Political party: PRD

Adriana Díaz Contreras (born 1 March 1970) is a Mexican politician from the Party of the Democratic Revolution. From 2006 to 2009 she served as Deputy of the LX Legislature of the Mexican Congress representing Morelos.
