= Agustín Basave Benítez =

Mexican politician

- Born: September 21, 1958 (age 68); Monterrey, Mexico
- Occupations: Politician, author, and academic
- Political party: Democratic Revolution

Agustín Francisco de Asis Basave Benítez (born September 21, 1958) is a Mexican politician and former president of the Party of the Democratic Revolution. From August 29 to November 6, 2015, he represented Nuevo León in the Chamber of Deputies of the LXIII Legislature. He resigned from the Chamber on November 6, 2015, in order to become president of the PRD, a position he held until July 2, 2016.

== Early life and education ==
Basave was born on September 21, 1958, in Monterrey. He served as a full-time investigator at the UNAM's Institute of Social Investigations and graduated with a bachelor's degree in Computer Administration Systems, awarded by the Monterrey Institute of Technology and Higher Education in 1980. Two years later, he obtained his master's degree in public policy and public administration from Purdue University, and in 1991, he graduated from Oxford University with a doctorate in political science.

== Career ==
Basave was originally a member of the PRI and served in several positions. Most notable among these was a three-year term in San Lázaro as a federal deputy to the LV Legislature, from 1991 to 1994. He presided over the Border Matters Commission and was the secretary of the Programming and Budget Commission. Simultaneously with his first tour of duty as a federal deputy, he served as an advisor to the PRI candidate for president, Luis Donaldo Colosio.

After a year as director of policy development for the SEGOB, Basave was tapped to become the president of Fundación Colosio, A.C., where he lasted two years. From 1997 to 1999, Basave directed the Corriente Renovadora within the PRI and served as a researcher at Tec de Monterrey. In 1999, he founded the school's Department of Political Science and Law.

The late 1990s and early 2000s marked a major transition for Basave, most notably in terms of political party. From 2001 to 2004, Basave served as ambassador to Ireland. In 2002, Basave left the PRI; three years later, he participated in the campaign of the Coalition for the Good of All; he also ran for federal deputy in 2006.

In the late 2000s, after being a president of the Consulting Council of the Broad Progressive Front, Basave returned to academia. He spent two years teaching at the UNAM's School of Political and Social Sciences (2007–09) and left that post to head the graduate school of the Universidad Iberoamericana, later heading the university's Office of Outreach and Internal Relations.

In 2015, Basave was placed on the party list from the second proportional representation district and won a seat in the Chamber of Deputies; he briefly served on the Migratory Matters and Transparency and Anticorruption Commissions. However, he lasted little more than two months in the seat. He resigned on November 6, 2015, and was replaced by his alternate Fernando Galván Martínez, from the same party. The next day, he became president of the PRD, winning 295 votes of a possible 304. He arrived at a party fraught with internal issues and losing popularity with the electorate.

In January 2016, Basave presented his resignation from the PRD presidency, but took it back and continued as the head of the party. On June 18, Basave definitively presented his resignation from the presidency effective July 2, noting that he failed to serve as a "sort of referee" between internal factions and that the decision was not prompted by the party's performance in gubernatorial elections. Basave will return to the Chamber of Deputies.

=== Academic work ===
Basave has been a regular guest on various radio and television opinion programs and has written columns for various newspapers. Among the outlets where Basave has contributed are Excélsior, Reforma, FOROtv, the Primer Plano program from Canal Once, and Radio Monitor. He also hosted a program, ¿A que le tiras...?, on the efektoTV cable channel.

Basave also has published several books, including Soñar no cuesta nada, México mestizo and Mexicanidad y esquizofrenia.
