= Jesús Zambrano Grijalva =

Mexican politician

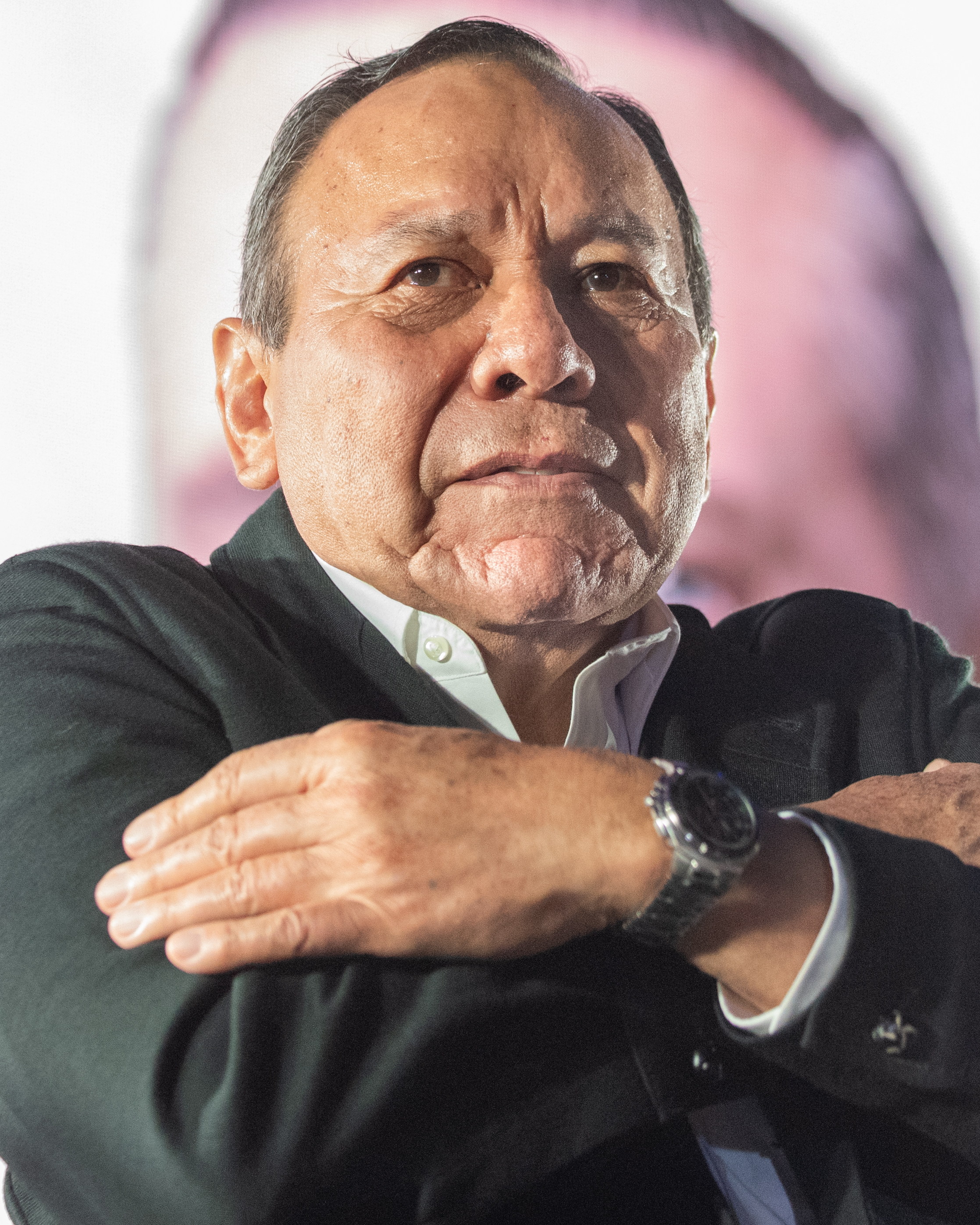
- Zambrano Grijalva in 2023
- Born: 1 October 1953 (age 72); Empalme, Sonora, Mexico
- Occupation: Politician
- Political party: PRD

José de Jesús Zambrano Grijalva (Note: In this Mexican name, the surname is Zambrano and the second or maternal family name is Grijalva.) (born 1 October 1953) is a Mexican politician who served as president of the Party of the Democratic Revolution (PRD) from 2011 to 2014 and from 2020 to 2024, a position he still held when the party lost its national registration in the aftermath of the 2024 general election. He also served as a federal deputy during the 56th and 61st Congresses, both times representing Sonora, and in the 63rd Congress, representing the Federal District.

== Life ==
Jesús Zambrano Grijalva was born on 1 October 1953 in Empalme, Sonora. He studied for a degree in physics and mathematics from the Universidad de Sonora, which was not completed, and later obtained a degree in law through the open university system.

Meanwhile, he surged through the ranks of various left-wing groups. He also was a member of the Frente Urbano Zapatista and the Liga Comunista 23 de Septiembre. His activism with the communist league resulted in a prison stay in 1974 and 1975. He also earned the nickname El Tragabalas (The Bullet-Swallower) during this time. Later, he moved on to organized political parties, including the Partido Patriótico Revolucionario, where he directed its newspaper, Tribuna Proletaria. In 1987, he was a founding member of the short-lived Mexican Socialist Party, and two years later, he helped to found the PRD. From 1990 to 1993, he represented the PRD at the Federal Registry of Electors.

In 1994, Zambrano was elected to his first of three terms in San Lázaro. He was the secretary of the Government and Constitutional Points Commission and also served on two other commissions: Communications and Transport and a select committee to investigate the death of Luis Donaldo Colosio. After his term, Zambrano ran for governor of Sonora in 1997 and came in third; he made another bid for the office in 2003, with the same result.

After his first loss in Sonora, Zambrano Grijalva headed to the Federal District, a PRD stronghold, where he was the Public Defender (Procurador Social) from 1997 to 1998 and the borough chief of Gustavo A. Madero from 1998 to 1999. He left that post to become the PRD's general secretary, a post he held for four years. From 2001 to 2003, Zambrano Grijalva studied for and received a degree in sociology from the Universidad Autónoma de San Luis Potosí. In 2004, during the leadership of Andrés Manuel López Obrador, Zambrano Grijalva returned to the Federal District government, as an advisor, liaison to Congress, and coordinator of strategic projects.

The aftermath of the 2006 presidential election caused Zambrano and others to distance themselves somewhat from López Obrador. Sympathizers formed the "Nueva Izquierda" (New Left) internal movement within the PRD. "Los Chuchos", as they were known, quickly ascended to power in the party, and in 2008, they placed Jesús Ortega Martínez in the party presidency.

In 2009, Zambrano returned to the Chamber of Deputies, representing Sonora. During the 61st Congress, he served as vice president of the Board of Directors and as secretary of the Mesa de Decanos, which groups the longest-serving federal legislators. He continued to put in time with the PRD, serving as coordinator of the party's Hidalgo gubernatorial campaign in 2010.

In 2011, Zambrano Grijalva was elected to be the new head of the PRD; he resigned from the Chamber of Deputies and Héctor Barraza Chávez served the remainder of his term. In March 2014, his three-year term was extended by several months until internal elections could be held that summer.

In 2015, Zambrano was elected yet again to the Chamber of Deputies for his third term, this time from the party list representing the Federal District. He served as president of the chamber's Board of Directors.
