= Party of the Democratic Revolution =

Mexican state-level political party

Party of the Democratic Revolution Partido de la Revolución Democrática
- Founders: Cuauhtémoc Cárdenas; Porfirio Muñoz Ledo; Ifigenia Martínez; Andrés Manuel López Obrador
- Founded: 5 May 1989; 37 years ago
- Dissolved: 19 December 2024; 21 months ago (at national level)
- Split from: Institutional Revolutionary Party (majority)
- Preceded by: National Democratic Front; Mexican Socialist Party (legal predecessor)
- Headquarters: Benjamín Franklin No. 84, Colonia Escandón, C.P. 11800. Mexico City; Mexico
- Youth wing: Juventudes de Izquierda
- Membership (2023): ▼999,249
- Ideology: Social democracy; Progressivism; Historical: Democratic socialism
- Political position: Centre-left; Historical: Left-wing
- National affiliation: Fuerza y Corazón por México (2023–2024); VXM (2020–2023)
- Continental affiliation: COPPPAL; São Paulo Forum
- International affiliation: Progressive Alliance
- Chamber of Deputies: 0 / 500 (0%)
- Senate: 0 / 128 (0%)
- Governorships: 0 / 32 (0%)
- State legislatures: 28 / 1,123 (2%)

The Party of the Democratic Revolution (Spanish: Partido de la Revolución Democrática [paɾˈtiðo ðe la reβoluˈsjon demoˈkɾatika], PRD) is a state-level social democratic political party in Mexico (previously national, until 2024). The PRD originated from the Democratic Current, a political faction formed in 1986 from the Institutional Revolutionary Party (PRI). The PRD was formed after the contested general election in 1988, which the PRD's immediate predecessor, the National Democratic Front, believed was rigged by the PRI. This sparked a movement away from the PRI's authoritarian rule.

As of 2023, the PRD was a member of the Fuerza y Corazón por México (Strength and Heart for Mexico) coalition. Internationally, the PRD was a member of the Progressive Alliance. The members of the party are known colloquially in Mexico as Perredistas. In 2024, the party failed to reach the necessary percentage of votes to keep its registration as a national political party.

== History ==
=== Early origins ===
==== Break from the PRI (1986–1988) ====
The PRD had its origins with the leftist members of the PRI, Institutional Revolutionary Party. The PRI had dominated Mexican politics since its founding in 1929. In 1986, a group of PRI members – including Ifigenia Martínez, Rodolfo González Guevara, Porfirio Muñoz Ledo, and Cuauhtémoc Cárdenas – formed the Democratic Current, a political faction within the PRI.

The Democratic Current aimed to pressure the PRI to become a more democratic party and to address the issue of national debt including the social effects of the economic crisis that came from attempting to pay that debt. The Democratic Current was also against technocratization, in which the people in power had not held public office and were scholars who were often educated abroad. Under the Miguel de la Madrid presidency which lasted from 1982–1988, the PRI and Mexico were moving towards a technocracy especially since de la Madrid was a technocrat himself. The Democratic Current did not have many technocrats and was thus left out of the decision-making process. This political marginalization led the Democratic Current members to be more vocal about their concerns because they did not have a position of power to protect within the PRI.

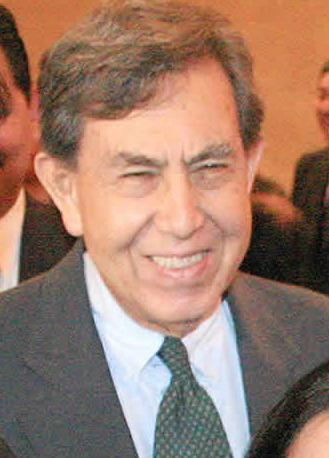
Cuauhtémoc Cárdenas Solórzano, Founder of the PRD

After public criticisms and debate between the Democratic Current and the PRI, ten Democratic Current members signed Working Document Number One which was the official beginning of the Democratic Current. However, the PRI refused to acknowledge the Democratic Current as an organization unless they joined a union, which was allowed in the PRI. The forming of a group that was not united because of work but because of difference in ideology within the PRI caused fear of division within the party.

Once de la Madrid's six-year term as president was coming to a close, the PRI chose six possible candidates for president and notably did not choose Cárdenas. The PRI had no process to apply as a candidate so Cárdenas could not run as a candidate for president. On 4 October 1987, Carlos Salinas de Gortari was ultimately chosen as the PRI candidate. Gortari did not embody anything that the Democratic Current wanted and many of the Democratic Current members left the PRI including Cárdenas during November 1987. Some Democratic Current members went on to support Cárdenas in his 1988 quest for presidency and help in the founding of the PRD.

==== 1988 presidential election ====
On 12 October 1987, Cárdenas became the Authentic Party of the Mexican Revolution's presidential candidate. Cárdenas still remained an independent candidate due to electoral laws which meant that many parties could choose Cárdenas as their candidate. The groups of the independent left that supported Cárdenas were the Mexican Socialist Party which included the Unified Socialist Party of Mexico, the Mexican Workers' Party, the Patriotic Revolutionary Party, the Communist Left Unity, and the People's Revolutionary Movement. The parastatal groups, state-owned enterprises that are separate from government, that supported Cárdenas were the Authentic Party of the Mexican Revolution, Popular Socialist Party, and the Party of the Cardenist Front of National Reconstruction, which made up the National Democratic Front. Other groups that supported Cárdenas were the Social Democratic Party, Ecologist Green Party of Mexico, Democratic Unity, Movement for Socialism, Critical Point Revolutionary Organization, and Neighborhood Assembly To provide a mechanism to coordinate and communicate with one another about campaign activities, these groups formed a coordinating body named the National Democratic Front (Mexico). The Mexican Socialist Party did not join in an official capacity, rather the party signed a separate pact with the Democratic Current.

In the 1988 presidential election, Cárdenas had come closer than any other political candidate to winning against the PRI, which had been in power since 1929. The victory of the PRI's candidate, Carlos Salinas de Gortari, was largely considered guilty of electoral fraud in 1988; this was after the computers tabulating votes had reportedly crashed. As a result, Cárdenas claimed that he had won the election, although he never declared himself president. The National Democratic Front continued to support Cárdenas by signing a Declaration for the Defense of Popular Sovereignty. Protests erupted in support of Cárdenas, the largest of which occurred on 16 July and had an attendance of at least 300,000 people. Nonetheless, the election was ratified. Years later, it was determined that there was indeed electoral fraud in the election.

=== Founding ===
The 1988 election sparked a movement against the authoritarian rule of the PRI. As an integral part of the movement towards democracy, the Party of the Democratic Revolution was formed as Mexico's only leftwing party. On 5 May 1989, Cárdenas declared the establishment of the PRD. Former PRI members who also helped found the PRD include: Cárdenas, Porfirio Muñoz Ledo, Ifigenia Martínez and Andrés Manuel López Obrador.

The party was founded by smaller left-wing parties such as the Mexican Communist Party (PCM), Unified Socialist Party of Mexico (PSUM), Mexican Socialist Party (PMS) and Mexican Workers' Party (PMT). The PMS donated its registration with the Federal Electoral Commission (CFE) to enable the new party to be established.

=== First decade (1989–1999) ===
PRD posters in Oaxaca, 1996

Small leftist group leaders joined the PRD which left small leftist organizations vulnerable. Additionally, some leftist organizations were wary that their concerns would be lost by joining a political group.

In the early years, the PRD was not successful in elections because of electoral fraud. The PRD often claimed that the PRI was participating in electoral fraud. This was in contrast to PAN, the conservative party, who chose to cooperate with the PRI. However, the PRD also cooperated with the PRI to make policy changes that moved towards democracy.

Salinas, PRI member and president of Mexico from 1988 to 1994, had made some improvements to the Mexican economy but Mexico still did not have a democratic system. During this time the PRD had become involved with many social justice movements against the neoliberal and antidemocratic policies of the PRI. The most famous of which was the party's involvement with the Zapatista Army of National Liberation (EZLN). Some members of the party wanted to strongly and publicly denounce the armed struggle, whereas others decided to emphatically approve the movement and its goals therefore, it was difficult to form a united front. Nonetheless, many PRD supporters also supported the EZLN and bolstered the movement through the use of posters and murals at PRD events. Although these instances portrayed the party to appear to be more radical than they were, Cárdenas himself took advantage of this support. He met with Subcomandante Marcos and did not attempt to distance the party from the EZLN. This support did not pay off as the EZLN did not help the PRD win any votes and Marcos accused the PRD of being the same as the PRI and PAN. The PRI labeled Cárdenas and the PRD as sympathizers of the EZLN and supporters of armed struggle. Additionally, the PRD had a difficult time transitioning from a movement with a non-negotiable goal to a party that pushed gradual reforms.

==== 1994 presidential election: Cárdenas ====
Cárdenas ran for national presidency under the PRD in 1994. Cárdenas ran against Diego Fernández, PAN candidate, and PRI party winner of the election, Ernesto Zedillo Ponce. Cárdenas made the Alianza Democrática Nacional campaign, where he mobilized 57 organizations. Cárdenas did not cooperate well with the PRD and was sometimes contradictory to the PRD.

The PRI used its media influence to promote the idea that changing the governing party would disrupt the nation as well as to portray Cárdenas and the PRD as confrontational and violent.

After his loss, Cárdenas claimed fraud; however, the party did not support him and instead focused on winning seats in Congress.

==== 1994 presidential election aftermath ====
In 1997, the PRD won its first governorship with Cárdenas as governor of Mexico City. The PRD also gained the second largest majority in the Chamber of Deputies. These victories were due in part to changes in electoral rules. These changes included the creation of the new Federal Elections Institute in 1990 which established six independent councilors who required legislative approval.

This division between currents was seen during the internal election of 14 March 1999 when there were voting discrepancies.

By the end of 1999, 650 members of the PRD had been assassinated, mostly by the PRI, as a way to intimidate those working towards democracy, civic engagement, and social movements.

=== Second decade (1999–2009) ===
==== 2000 presidential election: Cárdenas ====
After the election of Vicente Fox, PAN candidate, the PRD announced that it would not file any complaints about the elections. This was a shift in strategy from the usual protests of fraud. However, some local PRD activist groups filed complaints but these were turned down by the PRD and the electoral court.

==== 2006 presidential election ====
The former mayor of Mexico City, Andrés Manuel López Obrador, was the presidential candidate for the "Coalición por el Bien de Todos" (Coalition for the Good of All) in the 2006 presidential elections. López Obrador ran against Felipe Calderón, PAN candidate, and Roberto Madrazo, PRI candidate.

López Obrador's campaign relied on citizen's networks (redes ciudadanas) that focused on mobilizing the public to campaign. This strategy focused on López Obrador as an individual and not the PRD. This was worrisome to PRD leaders because they thought that the PRD's concerns would not be addressed. However, many party members thought that López Obrador would win so these concerns were not addressed.

After the general election of 2 July 2006 and a recount of the 9.09% of the ballot tally sheets which supposedly presented irregularities, the Federal Electoral Institute recorded the vote results in favor of Felipe Calderón by a margin of 0.58 percent, about 243,000 votes. These results were later validated by the Federal Electoral Tribunal. However, the PRD claimed that there was election fraud. The claims of election fraud have been rejected by the Federal Electoral Tribunal (TEPJF), which considered these "notoriously out of order" ("notoriamente improcedente") and certified PAN's candidate Felipe Calderón as the winner.

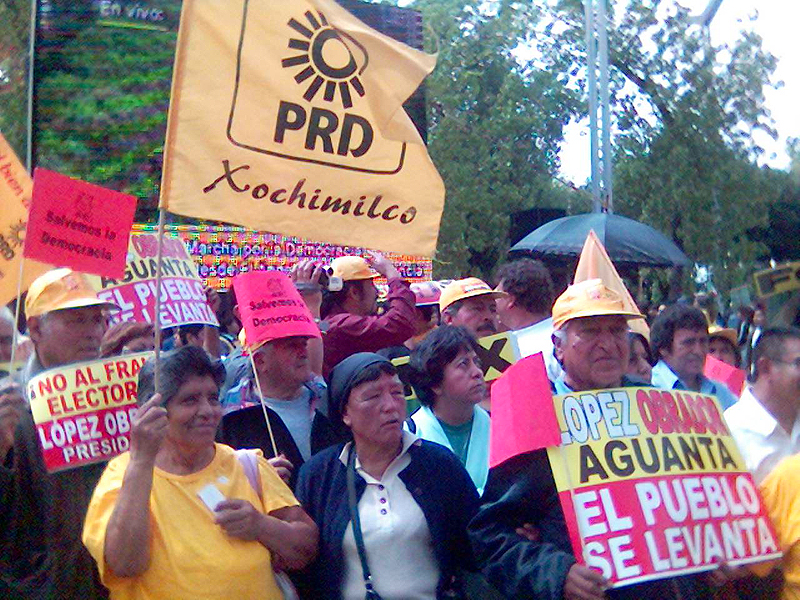
PRD activists at rally

López Obrador then rallied his supporters to hold demonstrations in the capital, Mexico City. These demonstrations were organized by the PRD, whose stronghold is in Mexico City. The PRD had called for demonstrations and set up camps in the capital's main square, blocking one of its main avenues (Paseo de la Reforma) for six weeks to demand a recount of all votes, which was not granted. The camps were later dismantled after a confrontation with the Mexican Army became likely.

On 5 September, the Federal Electoral Tribunal announced that there was not enough evidence of electoral fraud that legitimized Calderon as president. This caused López Obrador to maintain his campaign of civil disobedience and declared himself as "Legitimate President" in a "public open vote" (people in the main square raising their hands). López Obrador did not recognize the legitimacy of Calderón as president. The PRD was criticized for not complying with the democratic system that it had lauded and helped create. However, the PRD could not agree on whether they should move forward and cooperate with the current system and contribute to policy or take on an uncompromising stance in an attempt to overturn the current system. This split later trickled on to other things such as electoral and petroleum reforms where one part of the party wanted to cooperate while the other refused to out of allegiance to López Obrador.

In 2008, after bitter infighting within the party, Jesús Ortega, an opponent of Andrés Manuel López Obrador, was elected party president. In the 2009 legislative elections, López Obrador supported two smaller parties while maintaining his ties to the PRD.

==== Videoscandals ====
The party had enjoyed a reputation of honesty unmatched by its competitors, until the "Video Scandals" a series of videos where notable party members were taped receiving cash funds or betting large sums of money in a Las Vegas casino.

Later, another video was recorded by Cuba's government where Carlos Ahumada, the man providing the money, states that members of the PRI and PAN, PRD's rivals, were planning the situation presented in the first video as part of a plot against Andrés Manuel López Obrador to discredit him as a possible presidential candidate.

Party members who were seen on the videotapes were expelled from the party, but those who were supposedly associated, but never legally charged, are still active members.

=== Modern era (2009–present) ===
==== 2012 presidential election results ====
López Obrador ran for president again in 2012, but lost to Enrique Peña Nieto.

After the loss, López Obrador told a rally in Mexico City's main plaza Zocalo on 9 September 2012 that he would withdraw from the Democratic Revolution Party "on the best of terms," as well as the Labor Party and Citizens' Movement (MC). He added that he was working on founding a new party from the Movement for National Regeneration, which he would later name MORENA.

==== 2018 presidential election: Ricardo Anaya ====
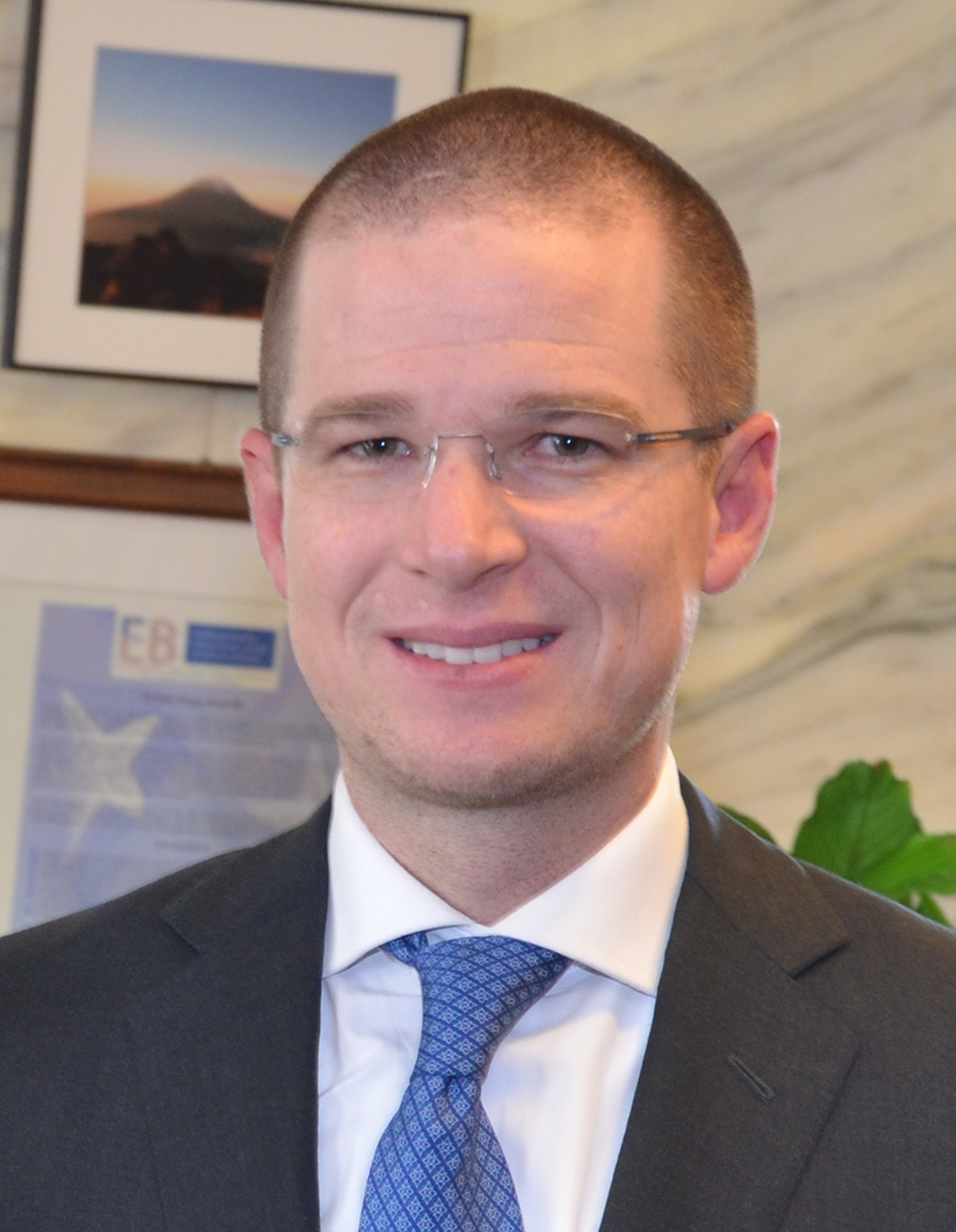
Ricardo Anaya in 2015.

The defeat of the PAN and the PRD in the Mexico general elections in 2012, as well as the departure of Andrés Manuel López Obrador from the PRD, caused these two parties to approach each other despite the friction obtained in the 2006 general elections.

In 2017, Ricardo Anaya, then President of PAN, announced his party's proposal to create an alliance of politicians called "Opposition Wide Front" to "form a coalition government that will result in a stable majority that can govern the country and make the change of regime a reality."

On 5 September, the PAN formalized an alliance with PRD and MC under the name of "Citizen Front for Mexico," registering the coalition before the National Electoral Institute, an alliance to last for 6 years.

On 17 December, the three parties ratified the alliance with the creation of an electoral coalition to participate in the federal elections of 2018 and multiple state elections with the name of "Por México al Frente."

==== 2018 presidential election aftermath ====
In August 2018, PRD abandoned Por México al Frente. In early 2019, the PRD split, with nine deputies leaving the PRD and joining Morena and the government coalition of López Obrador. This gave the government a two-thirds majority, allowing for the passage of constitutional reform.

On 22 December 2020, the PRD formed the new alliance Va por México, together with the National Action Party and the Institutional Revolutionary Party.

==== 2024 presidential election ====
In 2023, the PRD, along with the National Action Party and the Institutional Revolutionary Party formed the Fuerza y Corazón por México, an electoral alliance that competed in the 2024 Mexican general election with Xóchitl Gálvez as the coalitions' presidential candidate against the Sigamos Haciendo Historia coalition's candidate Claudia Sheinbaum of the Morena party.

=== Dissolution at national level ===
Having lost the general election and failed to have achieved 3% of the national vote in the 2024 general election (in neither the election for president, Senate, or Chamber of Deputies), the party lost its registration as a national party. It will remain registered as a state-level party and it can participate in the local elections of Aguascalientes, Baja California Sur, Guerrero, Mexico City, Michoacán, Morelos, Oaxaca, San Luis Potosí, Sonora, the State of Mexico, Tabasco, Tlaxcala and Zacatecas. On 28 August 2024, the two PRD senators-elect, Araceli Saucedo Reyes of Michoacán and José Sabino Herrera of Tabasco, switched their party affiliations to the Morena caucus ahead of the LXVI Legislature.

== State-level political party ==
After its dissolution at the national level, the PRD was able to maintain its registry in 13 federal entities.

State	Name	Founding	Dissolved
Aguascalientes	Party of the Democratic Revolution Aguascalientes	2024	—
Baja California Sur	Party of the Democratic Revolution Baja California Sur	2024	—
Mexico City	Party of the Democratic Revolution Mexico City	2024	—
State of Mexico	Party of the Democratic Revolution State of Mexico	2024	—
Guerrero	Party of the Democratic Revolution Guerrero	2024	—
Michoacán	Party of the Democratic Revolution Michoacán	2024	—
Morelos	Party of the Democratic Revolution Morelos	2024	—
Oaxaca	Party of the Democratic Revolution Oaxaca	2024	—
San Luis Potosí	Party of the Democratic Revolution San Luis Potosí	2024	—
Sonora	Party of the Democratic Revolution Sonora	2024	—
Tabasco	Party of the Democratic Revolution Tabasco	2024	—
Tlaxcala	Party of the Democratic Revolution Tlaxcala	2025	—
Zacatecas	Party of the Democratic Revolution Zacatecas	2024	—

== Election results ==
=== Presidential elections ===
Election year	Candidate	# votes	% vote	Result	Note
1994	Cuauhtémoc Cárdenas	5,852,134	17.1	✗ Defeated	
2000	Cuauhtémoc Cárdenas	6,256,780	16.6	✗ Defeated	Coalition: Alliance for Mexico
2006	Andrés Manuel López Obrador	14,756,350	35.3	✗ Defeated	Coalition: Coalition for the Good of All
2012	Andrés Manuel López Obrador	15,848,827	31.6	✗ Defeated	Coalition: Broad Progressive Front
2018	Ricardo Anaya	12,607,779	22.27	✗ Defeated	Coalition: Por México al Frente
2024	Xóchitl Gálvez	16,502,697	28.11	✗ Defeated	Coalition: Fuerza y Corazón por México

=== Congressional elections ===
==== Chamber of Deputies ====
Election year	Constituency		PR		No. of seats	Position	Presidency	Note
Election year	Votes	%	Votes	%	No. of seats	Position	Presidency	Note
1994	5,590,391	16.7	5,728,733	16.7	71 / 500	Minority	Ernesto Zedillo	
1997	7,435,456	25.7	7,518,903	25.7	125 / 500	Minority	Ernesto Zedillo	
2000	6,948,204	18.7	6,990,143	18.7	67 / 500	Minority	Vicente Fox	Coalition: Alliance for Mexico
2003	4,694,365	18.2	4,707,009	18.2	97 / 500	Minority	Vicente Fox	
2006	11,941,842	29.0	12,013,364	29.0	158 / 500	Minority	Felipe Calderón	Coalition: Coalition for the Good of All
2009	4,217,985	12.2	4,228,627	12.2	71 / 500	Minority	Felipe Calderón	
2012	13,426,702	27.0	13,502,179	27.0	101 / 500	Minority	Enrique Peña Nieto	Coalition: Broad Progressive Front
2015	1,941,105	5.13	4,335,731	10.87	56 / 500	Minority	Enrique Peña Nieto	Coalition: Broad Progressive Front
2018	96,393	0.17	2,984,861	5.27	23 / 500	Minority	Andrés Manuel López Obrador	Coalition: For Mexico to the Front
2021	248,505	0.51	1,792,700	3.64	17 / 500	Minority	Andrés Manuel López Obrador	Coalition: Va por México
2024	20,374	0.04	1,449,660	2.53	1 / 500	Minority	Claudia Sheinbaum	Coalition: Fuerza y Corazón por México

==== Senate elections ====
Election year	Constituency		PR		No. of seats	Position	Presidency	Note
Election year	Votes	%	Votes	%	No. of seats	Position	Presidency	Note
1994			5,579,949	16.8	8 / 128	Minority	Ernesto Zedillo	
1997			7,564,656	25.8	16 / 128	Minority	Ernesto Zedillo	
2000	7,027,944	18.9	7,027,994	18.8	16 / 128	Minority	Vicente Fox	Coalition: Alliance for Mexico
2006	12,292,512	29.7	12,397,008	29.7	36 / 128	Minority	Felipe Calderón	Coalition: Coalition for the Good of All
2012	13,609,393	27.2	13,718,847	27.3	28 / 128	Minority	Enrique Peña Nieto	Coalition: Broad Progressive Front
2018	96,393	0.17	2,984,861	5.27	9 / 128	Minority	Andrés Manuel López Obrador	Coalition: For Mexico to the Front
2024	76,082	0.13	1,363,012	2.36	2 / 128	Minority	Claudia Sheinbaum	Coalition: Fuerza y Corazón por México

=== Governorships ===
==== Mexico D.F. ====
Years in office	Chief of government	Note
1997–1999	Cuauhtémoc Cárdenas	
1999–2000	Rosario Robles	
2000–2005	Andrés Manuel López Obrador	
2005–2006	Alejandro Encinas	
2006–2012	Marcelo Ebrard	
2012–2018	Miguel Ángel Mancera	
2018	José Ramón Amieva	

==== Zacatecas ====
Years in office	Candidate	Note
1998–2004	Ricardo Monreal Ávila	
2004–2010	Amalia García	

==== Tlaxcala ====
Years in office	Candidate	Note
1999–2005	Alfonso Sánchez Anaya	

==== Baja California Sur ====
Years in office	Candidate	Note
1999–2005	Leonel Cota Montaño	
2005–2011	Narciso Agúndez Montaño	

==== Michoacán ====
Years in office	Candidate	Note
2002–2008	Lázaro Cárdenas Batel	
2008–2012	Leonel Godoy	
2015–2021	Silvano Aureoles Conejo	

==== Guerrero ====
Years in office	Candidate	Note
2005–2011	Zeferino Torreblanca Galindo	
2011–2014	Ángel Aguirre Rivero	
2014–2015	Rogelio Ortega Martínez	

==== Chiapas ====
Years in office	Candidate	Note
2000–2006	Pablo Salazar Mendiguchía	
2006–2012	Juan Sabines Guerrero	

==== Tabasco ====
Years in office	Candidate	Note
2012–2018	Arturo Núñez Jiménez	

==== Morelos ====
Years in office	Candidate	Note
2012–2018	Graco Ramírez Garrido	

==== Oaxaca ====
Years in office	Candidate	Note
2010–2016	Gabino Cué Monteagudo	In coalition with PAN, PRD, Convergence, and PT

==== Puebla ====
Years in office	Candidate	Note
2010–2016	Rafael Moreno Valle Rosas	In coalition with PAN and PRD
2018	Martha Erika Alonso	In coalition with PAN and PRD. In December of that same year, 10 days after assuming as governor, Alonso died in a helicopter crash.

==== Sinaloa ====
Years in office	Candidate	Note
2010–2016	Mario López Valdez	In coalition with PAN and PRD

==== Veracruz ====
Years in office	Candidate	Note
2016–2018	Miguel Ángel Yunes Linares	In coalition with PAN and PRD

== Principles ==
The PRD believes that Mexico currently has major problems of economic and social inequality that halt social development and affect liberty and democratic coexistence. Which is why the PRD has developed the following principles for their political party.

=== Democracy ===
- The PRD considers democracy to be the most fundamental principle that it hopes to establish in Mexico.
- The PRD believes that democracy is the political regime that should be established in society because the ruling power goes to the people through voting.
- The internal organization of the party should be democratic.
- The PRD believes that democracy in Mexico is strengthened by an open, democratic, and transparent system of parties.
- The PRD acknowledges the diversity of Mexico and is committed to preserving and developing it.
- The PRD is also committed to a secular state in which there can be liberty, tolerance, and coexistence between all people.

=== Human rights ===
- The PRD is against any form of segregation or discrimination.
- The PRD fights to promote, expand, respect, protect, and guarantee the exercise of human rights understood in its most broad meaning which includes:
  - civil rights
  - political rights
  - economic rights
  - social rights
  - cultural rights
  - environmental rights
  - right to access to information
  - right to solidarity for the collective benefit of all citizens
  - and rights of ethnic groups
- The PRD also emphasizes these rights regarding the following groups:
  - young people
  - children
  - women
  - senior citizens
  - the lesbian, gay, transsexual, transgender, bisexual, and intersexual community
  - migrant workers in the nation and abroad.
- The PRD recognizes Indigenous communities as equal regarding the human rights that they are entitled to, with differences that must be respected.
- These differences include their:
  - traditions
  - culture
  - forms of social expression
  - and language.
- The human rights that they are entitled to include:
  - right to self-autonomy
  - right to their land
  - right to the use of their land
  - right to conservation
  - right to collectively use their natural resources
  - right to access to economic development.
- The PRD believes it is an obligation of the state to support with public policy and methods necessary to guarantee the development of all indigenous communities and towns.
- The PRD sustains the fundamental principle of the San Andrés Accords.
- The PRD is also against the death penalty, militarization of police, and military jurisdiction to crimes and misdemeanors of civic order.

=== Substantive equality and diversity regarding sexual orientation ===
- The PRD believes in the equality between women and men as well as gender mainstreaming.
- The PRD champions access to the same treatment and opportunities between men and women.
- The PRD strives for women to have access to exercise their human, sexual, and reproductive rights and to make choices about their bodies in a free and informed manner.
- The PRD promotes gender equality in all social spheres which are manifested in patriarchal and machismo-based power relations that threaten the dignity of women.

=== Education, science, and culture ===
The PRD defends the educational principles that inspired the third article of the constitution and alight itself with an education -from beginning education to university- that is secular, public, free, scientific, and of quality, as well as an education that strengthens national identity.

=== Economy ===
The PRD, since its founding, believes that the state should have jurisdiction and should intervene in the fundamental and prioritized areas of the productive sector, such as nutrition, production of clean energy, telecommunications, the process of technology, infrastructure, communication mediums, financial systems, and technology trade for the national and regional development, restraining ownership and dominion of hydrocarbons and radio-electric spectrum for the nation and the recovery of basic goods that guarantee sovereignty.

=== Social justice ===
The PRD defends the rights of every Mexican worker, the preservation and expansion of social security, and the permanent improvements of contractual conditions.

=== Environment ===
The PRD adopts the principle of sustainable development as well as preserving the cultural environment. The PRD does this to satisfy the necessities of current and future generations, based on the responsible use of natural resources, including new tools for development, that would allow for the protection and recovery of the environment with comprehensive public policy.

=== International scope ===
The PRD supports the self-determination of communities, non-intervention, legal equality of states, the cooperation for national development and sovereignty, and the respect and incorporation of international treaties into legislation.

== Internal organization ==
The PRD consists of: congresses, councils, and executive committees, an assembly, and a committee. The nation, states, and municipalities have the same organization. They each have a congress, a council, and an executive committee. Congress has the most authority, the council coordinates communication between congresses, and the executive committee applies the guidelines set in place by the council. The maximum rule for any elected position is three years. The national, state and municipal president cannot be reelected for the same position. The PRD has an anti-discriminatory policy for its internal elections. The PRD has policies put in place that guarantee the inclusion of women, young people, and indigenous people.

The National Congress is the maximum authority of the PRD. The National Congress approves the statue, the declaration of principles, the program, and the political organization of the party. 90% of the National Congress is made up of delegates elected in municipal assemblies. The rest of the National Congress is made up of two delegates for each State Council, the presidents of the State Councils, the members of the National Executive Committee, and the elected delegates of the National Council that shall not exceed 4% of the total delegates in the Party's Congress. The National Council chooses the majority of its 21-member executive committee except for the president of the party, the secretary of the party, and the parliamentary group coordinators.

In 2014, the PRD became the first political party to have internal elections organized by the Federal Electoral Institute where those affiliated with the party could vote for the members of the National Congress and Council as well as State and Municipal Councils. 2 million people participated in the internal elections which is about 45% of those affiliated with the party.

=== Currents ===
Inside the PRD, there are "currents" that are dedicated to specific approaches and stances or about specific themes or movements. These include:

- National Democratic Alternative (Alternativa Democrática Nacional)
- New Left (Nueva Izquierda)
- New Sun Forum (Foro Nuevo Sol)
- National Democratic Left (Izquierda Democrática Nacional)
- Political Action Group (Grupo Acción Política)

=== Presidents ===
Years in office	President	Note
1989–1993	Cuauhtémoc Cárdenas	
1993	Roberto Robles Garnica	Interim
1993–1996	Porfirio Muñoz Ledo	
1996–1999	Andrés Manuel López Obrador	
1999	Pablo Gómez Álvarez	Interim
1999–2002	Amalia García	
2002–2003	Rosario Robles	
2003–2005	Leonel Godoy Rangel	Interim
2005–2008	Leonel Cota Montaño	
2008	Graco Ramírez and Raymundo Cárdenas	Legal representatives
2008	Guadalupe Acosta Naranjo	Interim
2008–2011	Jesús Ortega	
2011–2014	Jesús Zambrano Grijalva	
2014–2015	Carlos Navarrete Ruiz	
2015–2016	Agustín Basave Benítez	
2016	Beatriz Mojica Morga	Interim
2016–2017	Alejandra Barrales	
2017–2018	Manuel Granados Covarrubias	
2018	Ángel Ávila Romero	Interim
2018–2020	Ángel Ávila, Fernando Belaunzarán, Karen Quiroga, Adriana Díaz, Camerino Márquez and Estefany Santiago	Extraordinary National Directorate
2020–2024	Jesús Zambrano Grijalva	

== See also ==
- Politics of Mexico
- List of political parties in Mexico
- History of democracy in Mexico
