= President of the Senate (Mexico) =

Presiding officer of the Mexican Senate

President of the Chamber of Senators
- Presidente de la Cámara de Senadores
- Senate Seal

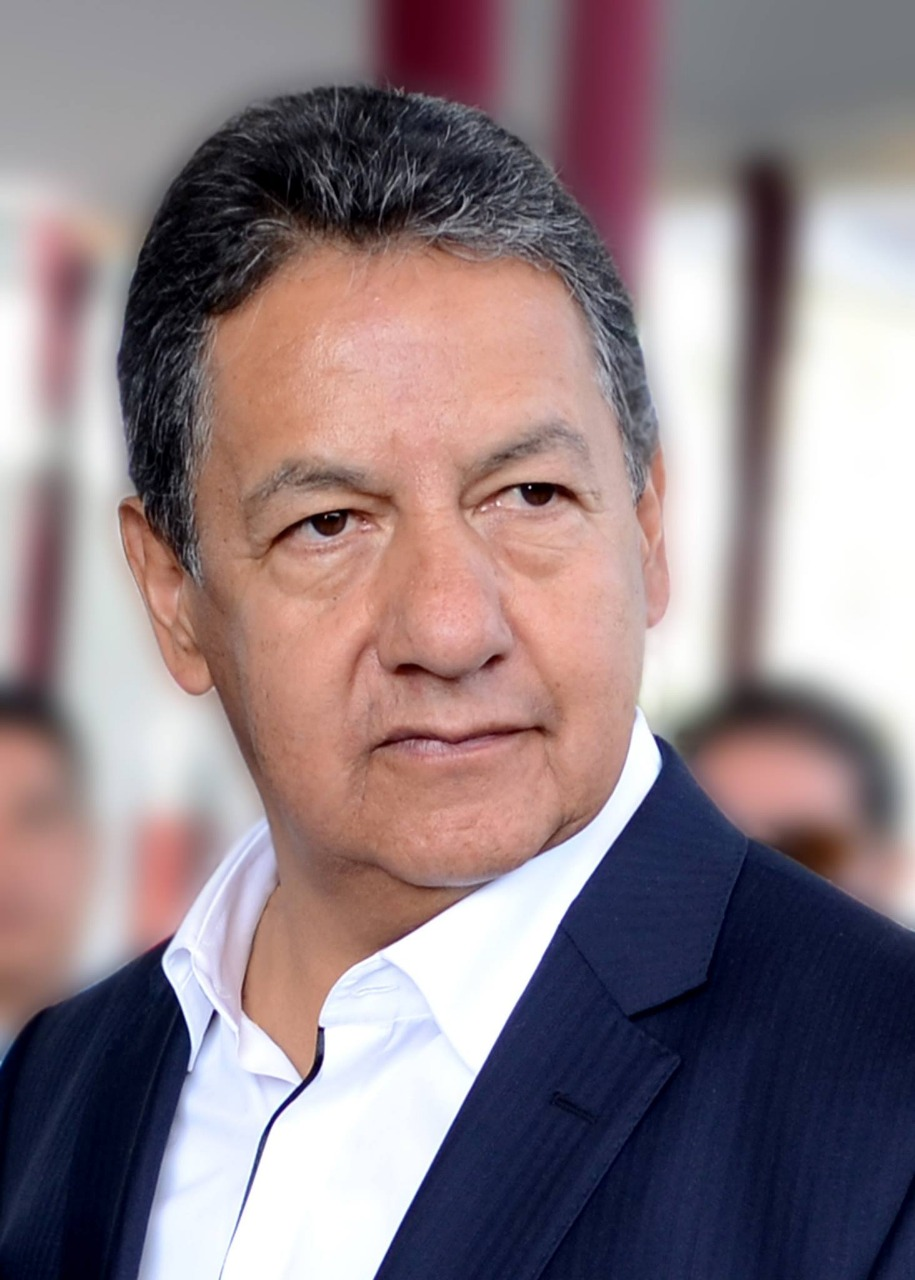
- Incumbent; Higinio Martínez since 1 September 2026
- Senate of the Republic
- Style: Senador(a) presidente(a)
- Status: Presiding officer
- Seat: Senate Palace, Mexico City
- Appointer: Senate
- Term length: One year
- Constituting instrument: Constitution of Mexico
- Formation: 1 January 1825; 201 years ago
- First holder: Valentín Gómez Farías

The president of the Senate (Spanish: Presidente de la Cámara de Senadores) is the presiding officer of the Mexican Senate. The incumbent president is Senator Higinio Martínez Miranda.

The Senate of Mexico, at the beginning of each annual legislative session, elects an executive board (Mesa Directiva) from among its 128 members. The executive board comprises a president, three vice-presidents, and four secretaries, elected by an absolute majority of the senators. The president, and other members of the executive board may be re-elected for the following year without restriction. The president of the executive board also serves as the President of the Senate.

Although the President of the Senate is the presiding officer of the upper house of the Mexican Congress, the President of the Chamber of Deputies is the President of Congress as a whole.

== Presidents of the Senate 1824-1857 ==
Name	State/Entity	Term	Notes
Valentín Gómez Farías	Jalisco	1 January 1825 – 31 January 1825	
Simón de la Garza	Nuevo León	1 February 1825 – 28 February 1825	
Florentino Martínez	Chihuahua	1 March 1825 – 5 April 1825	
Juan de Dios Cañedo	Jalisco	5 April 1825 – 30 April 1825	
José Manuel Couto	Veracruz	1 May 1825 – 21 May 1825	

== Presidents of the Senate 1874-2000 ==
Name	State/Entity	Term	Notes
José Castillo Torre		1926	
Higinio Alvarez		1928	
Agustín Casas, D. N. Santos		1931	
Fernando Amilpa y Rivera		1948	
Carlos I. Serrano		1951	
Silvano Barba González		1953	
Salvador Urbina		1954	
Antonio Rocha Cordero		1955	
Miguel Osorio Ramirez		1956	
Teófilo Borunda		1957	
Vicente Dávila Aguirre		1958	
Rodolfo Brena Torres		1959	
Hílario Medína		1960	
Carlos Román Celis		1961	
Rafael Moreno Valle		1962	
Ramón Ruiz Vasconcelos		1963	
Manuel Tello Baurraud		1964	
María Lavalle Urbina		1965	
José Ricardi Tirado		1966	
Florencio Barrero Fuentes		1967	
Fernando Ordorica Inclán		1967	
Baltazar R. Leyva Mancilla		1968	
Alfredo Ruiseco Avellaneda		1968	
Mario C. Olivera		1969	
Alfredo Toxqui Fernández de Lara		1970	
Carlos Pérez Cámara		1971	
Florencio Salazar Martínez		1972	
Enrique González Pedrero		1973	
Francisco Luna Kan, Guadalupe López Bretón		1974	
Enrique Olivares Santana		1975	
Emilio M. González Parra		1975	
Joaquín Gamboa Pascoe		1976	
Federico Amaya Rodríguez		1976	
Juan José Gastélum Salcido, José Guadalupe Cervantes		1977	
Antonio Ocampo Ramírez, Javier Rondero Zubieta		1978	
Silverio Ricardo Alvarado, Rafael Minor Franco		1979	
Nicolás Reynés Berezaluce		1980	
Martha Chávez Padrón		1980	
Blas Chumacero		1981	
Miguel González Avelar, Américo Villareal Guerra, Mariano Piña Olaya, Antonio Riva Palacio		1982	
Antonio Riva Palacio, Norberto Mora Plancarte, Raúl Salinas Lozano, Miguel González Avelar, Gilberto Muñoz Mosqueda		1983	
José Ramírez Gamero, Celso Humberto Delgado Ramírez		1984	
Miguel González Avelar, Salvador Neme Castillo, Antonio Riva Palacio, Ernesto Millán Escalante		1985	
Javier Ahumada Padilla, Rigoberto Ochoa Zaragoza, Víctor Manzanilla Schaffer, Agustín Téllez Cruces, Alfonso Zegbe Sanen, Gonzalo Martínez Corbalá		1986	
Antonio Riva Palacio, Juan Sigrido Millán Lizárraga, Mario Hernández Posadas, Patrocinio González Garrido		1987	
Jesús Rodríguez y Rodríguez, Héctor Hugo Olivares Ventura		1988	
Emilio M. González, Nicolás Reynés Berezaluce, Alfonso Martínez Domínguez		1989	
Teófilo Torres Corzo, Emilio M. González, Maximiliano Silerio Esparza, Enrique Burgos García		1990	
Fernando Silva Nieto, Emilio M. González, Alonso Aguirre Ramos, Artemio Iglesias Miramontes		1991	
Salvador Neme Castillo, Emilio M. González, Gustavo Guerrero Ramos, Manuel Aguilera Gómez		1992	
Emilio M. González, Salvador Sánchez Vázquez, Mauricio Valdés Rodríguez, Humberto Lugo Gil, Eduardo Robledo Rincón		1993	
Fernando Ortiz Arana, Ricardo Monreal Avila, Raúl Enrique Carrillo Silva, Oscar Ramírez Mijares		1994	
Ernesto Navarro González, Guadalupe López Bretón, Gustavo Carvajal Moreno, Humberto Lugo Gil		1995	
Raúl Durán Reveles, Genovevo Figueroa Zamudio, Fernando Ortiz Arana, Germán Sierra Sánchez, Ernesto Navarro González, Miguel Alemán Velasco, Carlos Humberto Aceves del Olmo		1996	
Heladio Ramírez López, Laura Pavón Jaramillo, Alvaro Vallarta Ceceña, Manuel Medellín Milán, Genovevo Figueroa Zamudio, Dionisio Eduardo Pérez Jácome		1997	
Heladio Ramírez López, Juan Ramiro Robledo Ruiz, Ignacio Vázquez Torres, Fernando Palomino Topete, Dionisio Eduardo Pérez Jácome		1998	
Héctor Ximénez González, Cristóbal Arias Solís, Juan Antonio García Villa, Sami David David		1999	
María de los Ángeles Moreno	Mexico City	? – March 2000 – 1 September 2000	

== Presidents of the Senate since 2000 ==
Legislature	Session	Term	Portrait	Name	Party
58th	1	September 1, 2000 – August 31, 2001		Enrique Jackson	Institutional Revolutionary Party
58th	2	September 1, 2001 – August 31, 2002		Diego Fernández de Cevallos	National Action Party
58th	3	September 1, 2002 – August 31, 2003		Enrique Jackson	Institutional Revolutionary Party
59th	1	September 1, 2003 – August 31, 2004		Enrique Jackson	Institutional Revolutionary Party
59th	2	September 1, 2004 – August 31, 2005		Diego Fernández de Cevallos	National Action Party
59th	3	September 1, 2005 – August 31, 2006		Enrique Jackson	Institutional Revolutionary Party
60th	1	September 1, 2006 – August 31, 2007		Manlio Fabio Beltrones	Institutional Revolutionary Party
60th	2	September 1, 2007 – August 31, 2008		Santiago Creel	National Action Party
60th	3	September 1, 2008 – August 31, 2009		Gustavo Madero Muñoz	National Action Party
61st	1	September 1, 2009 – August 31, 2010		Carlos Navarrete Ruiz	Party of the Democratic Revolution
61st	2	September 1, 2010 – August 31, 2011		Manlio Fabio Beltrones	Institutional Revolutionary Party
61st	3	September 1, 2011 – August 31, 2012		José González Morfin	National Action Party
62nd	1	September 1, 2012 – August 31, 2013		Ernesto Cordero Arroyo	National Action Party
62nd	2	September 1, 2013 – August 31, 2014		Raúl Cervantes Andrade	Institutional Revolutionary Party
62nd	3	September 1, 2014 – August 31, 2015		Miguel Barbosa Huerta	Party of the Democratic Revolution
63rd	1	September 1, 2015 – August 31, 2016		Roberto Gil Zuarth	National Action Party
63rd	2	September 1, 2016 – August 31, 2017		Pablo Escudero Morales	Ecologist Green Party of Mexico
63rd	3	September 1, 2017 – August 31, 2018		Ernesto Cordero Arroyo	National Action Party
64th	1	September 1, 2018 – August 31, 2019		Martí Batres	National Regeneration Movement
64th	2	September 1, 2019 – August 31, 2020		Mónica Fernández Balboa	National Regeneration Movement
64th	3	September 1, 2020 – August 31, 2021		Eduardo Ramírez Aguilar	National Regeneration Movement
65th	1	September 1, 2021 – August 31, 2022		Olga Sánchez Cordero	National Regeneration Movement
65th	2	September 1, 2022 – August 31, 2023		Alejandro Armenta	National Regeneration Movement
65th	3	September 1, 2023 – August 31, 2024		Ana Lilia Rivera	National Regeneration Movement
66th	1	September 1, 2024 – August 31, 2025		Gerardo Fernández Noroña	National Regeneration Movement
66th	2	September 1, 2025 – August 31, 2026		Laura Itzel Castillo	National Regeneration Movement
66th	3	September 1, 2026 – Incumbent		Higinio Martínez	National Regeneration Movement

== List of presidents of the Gran Comisión 1877-2000 ==
Name	Term	Notes
Juan N. Méndez	20 September 1877 – 31 August 1880	
Benigno Arriaga	18 September 1880 – 31 August 1882	
Felipe Arellano	25 September 1882 – 31 August 1884	
Cástulo Zenteno	17 September 1884 – 31 August 1886	
Pedro Diez Gutiérrez	17 September 1886 – 31 August 1888	
Fernando Mendizábal	17 September 1888 – 31 August 1890	
José Montesinos	17 September 1890 – 31 August 1892	
Juan Bustamante	17 September 1892 – 31 August 1894	
Apolinar Castillo	17 September 1894 – 31 August 1896	
José A. Puebla	18 September 1896 – 31 August 1898	
Antonio Falcón	17 September 1898 – 31 August 1900	
Emilio Rabasa	17 September 1900 – 31 August 1904	
Rafael Dondé	17 September 1904 – 31 August 1906	
Manuel A. Mercado	17 September 1906 – 31 August 1908	
Sebastián Camacho	17 September 1908 – 31 August 1910	
Nicolás López Garrido	17 September 1910 – 31 August 1912	
Luis del Carmen Curiel	17 September 1912 – 31 August 1917	
José J. Reynoso	11 October 1917 – 31 August 1918	
Ildefonso V. Vázquez	13 September 1918 – 31 August 1920	
Jonas García	6 September 1920 – 31 August 1922	
Rafael Subarán Capmany	2 September 1922 – 31 August 1924	
Abel Rodríguez	2 September 1924 – 31 August 1926	
José J. Reynoso	11 October 1926 – 31 August 1928	
Pedro Belauzarán	2 September 1928 – 31 August 1930	
Jerónimo Siller	2 September 1930 – 31 August 1932	
César Alayola Barrera	2 September 1932 – 31 August 1934	
Dámaso Cárdenas del Río	2 September 1934 – 31 August 1937	
José González Gallo	2 September 1937 – 31 August 1940	
Alfredo Zárate Albarrán	2 September 1940 – 31 August 1943	
Rafael Rangel	2 September 1943 – 31 August 1946	
Carlos I. Serrano	2 September 1946 – 31 August 1952	
Pedro de Alba	2 September 1952 – 31 August 1955	
José Rodríguez Clavería	2 September 1955 – 31 August 1958	
Rodolfo Brena Torres	3 September 1958 – 31 August 1961	
Manuel Moreno Sánchez	4 September 1961 – 31 August 1964	
Manuel Moreno Moreno	4 September 1964 – 31 August 1967	
Manuel Bernardo Aguirre	4 September 1967 – 31 August 1970	
Enrique Olivares Santana	2 September 1970 – 31 August 1973	
Carlos Sansores Pérez	3 September 1976 – 7 December 1976	
Joaquín Gamboa Pascoe	7 December 1976 – 31 August 1982	
Miguel González Avelar	2 September 1982 – 31 August 1985	
Antonio Riva Palacio	26 March 1985 – 18 December 1987	
Salvador Neme Castillo	19 December 1987 – 31 August 1988	
Emilio M. González	5 September 1988 – 1994	
Humberto Lugo Gil	1994	
Fernando Ortiz Arana	15 October 1994 – 5 March 1997	
Genovevo Figueroa Zamudio	6 March 1997 – 27 October 1998	
María de los Ángeles Moreno	29 October 1998 – 31 August 2000	
