= Condecoración Miguel Hidalgo =

Condecoración "Miguel Hidalgo"
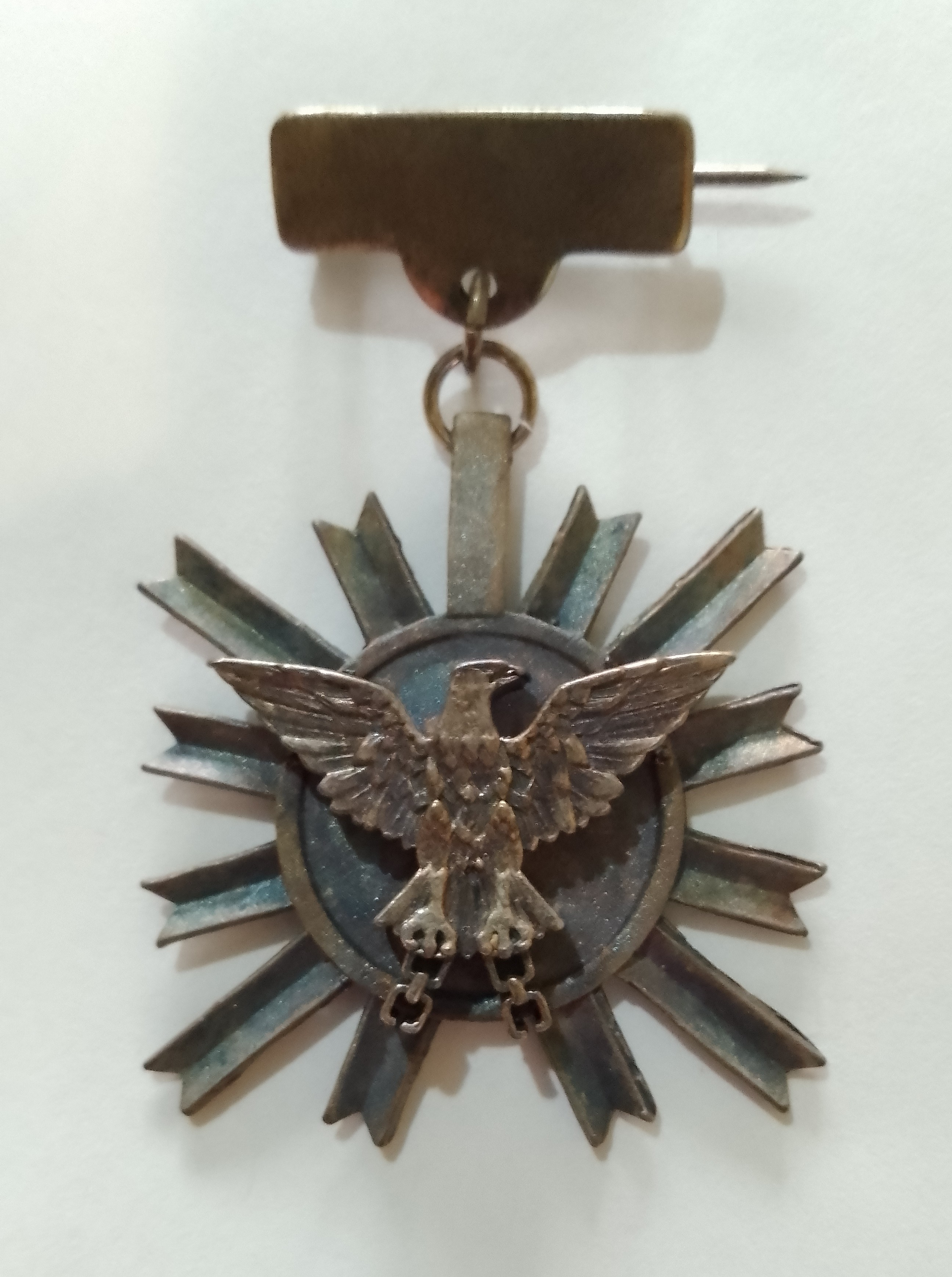
- Plaque of the Decoration
- Type: State decoration
- Awarded for: Eminent or distinguished merits; exemplar conduct or life's work; relevant services rendered unto the Nation or to Humanity; or heroic acts
- Presented by: Mexico
- Eligibility: Mexican citizens
- Status: active de jure, dormant de facto

The Condecoración "Miguel Hidalgo" or Miguel Hidalgo Decoration forms part of the Mexican Honours System. It is de jure the highest award that the United Mexican States can issue its citizens. It is awarded for eminent or distinguished merits; exemplar conduct or life's work; relevant services rendered unto the Nation or to Mankind; or heroic acts. There are very few records of it being awarded.

== Background ==
The award is named after Miguel Hidalgo y Costilla (1753–1811), Mexican Catholic priest and main leader of the Mexican War of Independence.

In 1975, President Luis Echeverría signed the decree establishing the Mexican Law of Prizes, Stimuli and Civil Rewards, which lists the awards issued by the Executive Branch of the Government of Mexico and established the Condecoración "Miguel Hidalgo" as the nation's highest award to its own citizens.

== Description ==
The decoration consists of four classes:

- Collar:
  - For heroic acts, difficult to repeat by a person of exemplary conduct;
  - For services rendered unto the Nation or to Humanity, of a transcendent and extremely beneficial nature.
- Cross:
  - For eminent merits;
  - For outstandingly exemplar conduct;
  - For heroic acts or services rendered which would not merit a collar.
- Band:
  - For distinguished merits;
  - For conduct so exemplary that it warrants making it public knowledge.
- Plaque:
  - For merits not contemplated by the previous grades.

== Recipients ==
- Hilario Durán Herreros – Received the Band in 1978 for his contributions to the development of Mexico's Customs Regulations and Administrative Reform.
- Jesús Silva Herzog – Received the Collar in 1979 for his contributions to Mexico's academic system and for his merits as "Economic Liberator"
- Ignacio T. Chavez – Received on May 8, 1980, from President Jose Lopez Portillo for his merits as "Doctor and Humanist"
- Nicolas T. Bernal – Received on May 8, 1980, from President Jose Lopez Portillo for his merits as "Floresmagonist Fighter"
- 58 health workers from hospitals of IMSS, ISSSTE, Insabi, Semar, and Pemex – Received the Collar on September 16, 2020, for their work in combatting the COVID-19 pandemic.
- 425 Condecoraciones. November 20, 2020, the "Agreement granting the Miguel Hidalgo Decoration in cross grade to the health personnel indicated, for eminent merits and outstandingly exemplary conduct in the attention of the health emergency caused by the SARS-CoV2 virus (COVID-19)", was published in the Official Gazette of the Federation. in which a total of 425 creditors were listed to the award.
- For outstandingly exemplary conduct and in band degree, for distinguished merits in the attention of the health emergency caused by the SARS-CoV2 virus (COVID-19) provided in the Law of Prizes, Incentives and Civil Rewards, the Jury of Award of the Miguel Hidalgo Decoration formulated by opinion the proposals to the Award Council, of 6,650 people decorated in band grade.DOF

== See also ==
- Belisario Domínguez Medal of Honor – Highest award issued by the Mexican Senate and de facto highest award for Mexicans.
- Order of the Aztec Eagle – Highest award issued by the Government of Mexico to foreigners.
- Mexican Honours System
- National Public Administration Prize – Highest award issued by the Government of Mexico to Mexican civil servants.
- National Prize for Arts and Sciences – Highest award issued by the Government of Mexico to Mexican artists and scientists.
