= Salvador Zubirán =

Mexican doctor (1898–1998)

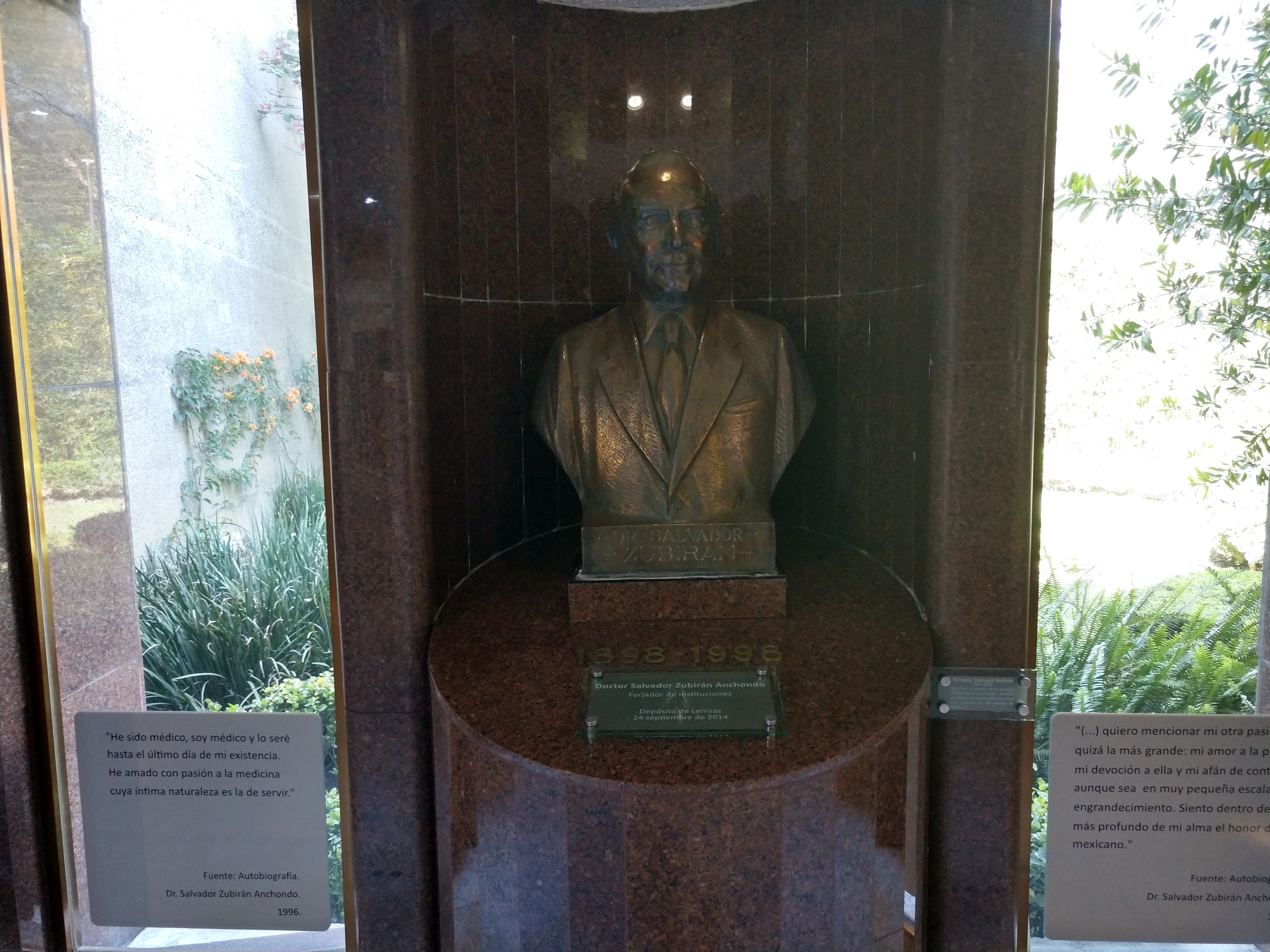
Facilities of the National Institute of Medical Sciences and Nutrition Salvador Zubirán, Mexico City.

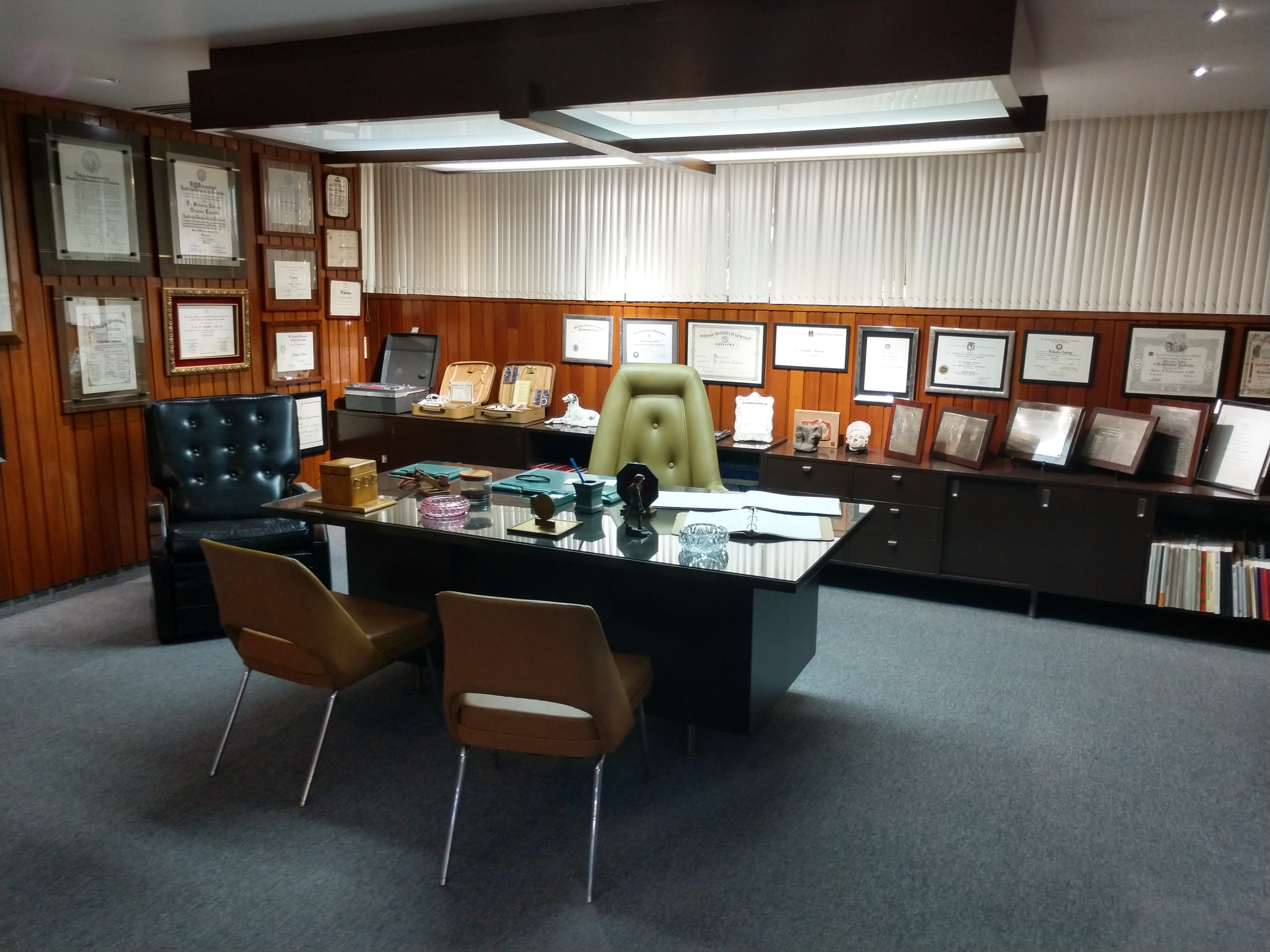
Replica of the doctor's office Salvador Zubirán. Facilities of the National Institute of Medical Sciences and Nutrition Salvador Zubirán, Mexico City.

Salvador Zubirán Anchondo (23 December 1898, Cusihuiriachi, Chihuahua – 10 June 1998, Mexico City) was one of Mexico's most prominent physicians and nutritionists.

== Biography ==
He received his MD from the National University of Mexico (UNAM) Faculty of Medicine and visited the Peter Bent Brigham Hospital in Boston, Massachusetts, United States, from 1924 to 1925, where he received a diploma.

Upon his return to Mexico he started the nutrition department in Mexico City's General Hospital, and later received an assignment to start the National Institute of Nutrition, one of the country's premier medical institutions. On 6 January 1945, he was appointed as its first director general. Zubirán also served as the rector of the National Autonomous University of Mexico (UNAM) during the 1940s; during this appointment, he was very influential in the creation of the University City.

In 1985, in Chihuahua, he married María Luisa López-Collada Márquez de Richardson, the widow of American banker William B. Richardson II. By this marriage, he became the stepfather of the American politician and one-time presidential hopeful Bill Richardson.

He was a recipient of the National Prize for Arts and Sciences in 1968 and of the Belisario Domínguez Medal of Honor, the highest honor awarded by the Senate of Mexico, in 1986.

== Legacy ==
In 1981, the National Institute of Medical Sciences and Nutrition was renamed to the National Institute of Nutrition Salvador Zubirán, and again in 2000 to the National Institute of Medical Sciences and Nutrition Salvador Zubirán (INCMNSZ).

Preceded by María Lavalle Urbina	Belisario Domínguez Medal of Honor; 1986	Succeeded by Eduardo García Maynez
