= Belisario Domínguez Medal of Honor =

Mexican award by the Senate

Belisario Domínguez Medal of Honor Medalla de Honor "Belisario Domínguez" del Senado de la República
- Awarded for: contribution "toward the welfare of the Nation and mankind"
- Presented by: Mexico
- Eligibility: Mexican entities representing "the cultural spirit of the time"
- Status: currently constituted
- Ribbon bar of the medal

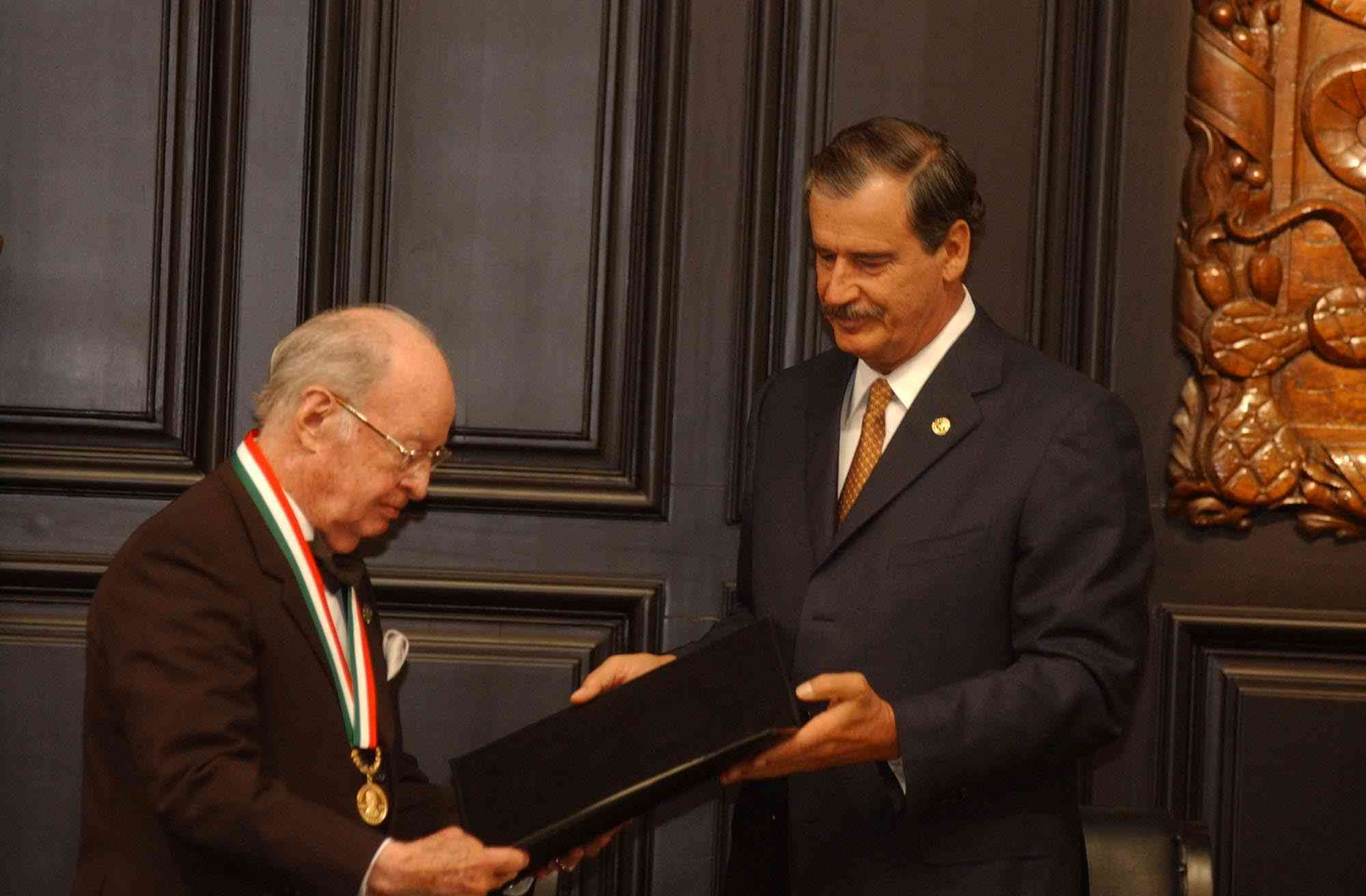
Carlos Canseco González is awarded the Belisario Domínguez Medal by President Vicente Fox

The Belisario Domínguez Medal of Honor (Spanish: Medalla de Honor "Belisario Domínguez" del Senado de la República) is the highest award bestowed by the Mexican Senate.

It forms part of the Mexican Honors System and is currently Mexico's highest active award since there are no records of the Condecoración "Miguel Hidalgo" being presented since 1979. The award has been given every year since 1954 by the Senate of Mexico to eminent Mexicans with a distinguished lifetime career who contributed most "toward the welfare of the Nation and mankind".

Only Mexican entities representing "the cultural spirit of the time" are allowed to submit nominations for this award. This provision typically allows universities, newspapers, learned societies, non-governmental organizations and government entities to nominate candidates.

== Background ==
The award is named after politician Belisario Domínguez (1863–1913). Domínguez was a Senator for the state of Chiapas at the time of the Mexican Revolution. After Victoriano Huerta's coup d'état, which ousted President Francisco I. Madero, Domínguez circulated a speech as a letter to fellow members of congress in which he denounced Huerta's actions and encouraged Congress to depose him. At the end of his letter he also encouraged readers to make copies of it and distribute them around the country. The speech was not taken well in Huerta's circles and Domínguez was assassinated a few days later, on October 7, 1913.

In 1953, President Adolfo Ruiz Cortines signed the decree establishing the award in remembrance of this "martyr of democracy". That same year the Senate decided to bestow the first medal on the bust of Belisario Domínguez that already existed in the Senate Chamber as a symbolic act. It is for this reason that the medal was awarded twice in 1954.

== Description ==
The medal consists of a single class and is awarded to a single recipient during a solemn ceremony in the Senate Chamber on October 7. A gold medal hanging from a silk ribbon with the colors of the Mexican flag is given together with a diploma signed by the President of the Republic and the leader of the Senate.

The medal has the national coat of arms on one side together with the inscription "Estados Unidos Mexicanos, H. Cámara de Senadores 1952–1958" ("United Mexican States, Honourable Chamber of Senators 1952–1958"). The reverse side of the medal has an image of Domínguez' bust together with the inscription "Ennobleció a la Patria, 7 de octubre de 1913" ("Ennobled the Nation, October 7, 1913").

== Recipients ==
The following is a complete list of people who have been recipients of the Belisario Domínguez Medal. Only in 1954 and 2021 the medal has been awarded twice.

- 1954 – Rosaura Zapata and Erasmo Castellanos Quinto
- 1955 – Esteban Baca Calderón
- 1956 – Gerardo Murillo, "Dr. Atl"
- 1957 – Roque Estrada Reynoso
- 1958 – Antonio Díaz Soto y Gama
- 1959 – Heriberto Jara Corona
- 1960 – Isidro Fabela
- 1961 – José Inocente Lugo
- 1962 – María Tereza Montoya
- 1963 – María Hernández Zarco
- 1964 – Adrián Aguirre Benavides
- 1965 – Plácido Cruz Ríos
- 1966 – Ramón F. Iturbe
- 1967 – Francisco L. Urquizo
- 1968 – Miguel Angel Cevallos
- 1969 – María Cámara Vales, widow of Pino Suárez, Francisco I. Madero's vice president
- 1970 – Rosendo Salazar
- 1971 – Jaime Torres Bodet
- 1972 – Ignacio Ramos Praslow
- 1973 – Pablo E. Macías Valenzuela
- 1974 – Rafael de la Colina Riquelme
- 1975 – Ignacio Chávez Sánchez
- 1976 – Jesús Romero Flores
- 1977 – Juan de Dios Bátiz Peredes
- 1978 – Gustavo Baz Prada
- 1979 – Fidel Velázquez Sánchez
- 1980 – Luis Padilla Nervo
- 1981 – Luis Alvarez Barret
- 1982 – Gen. Raúl Madero González
- 1983 – Jesús Silva Herzog
- 1984 – Salomón González Blanco
- 1985 – María Lavalle Urbina
- 1986 – Salvador Zubirán
- 1987 – Eduardo García Maynez
- 1988 – Rufino Tamayo
- 1989 – Raúl Castellano Jiménez
- 1990 – Andrés Serra Rojas
- 1991 – Gonzalo Aguirre Beltrán
- 1992 – Ramón G. Bonfil
- 1993 – Andrés Henestrosa Morales
- 1994 – Jaime Sabines Gutiérrez
- 1995 – Miguel León-Portilla
- 1996 – Griselda Álvarez Ponce de León
- 1997 – Heberto Castillo Martínez
- 1998 – José Angel Conchello Dávila (posthumous)
- 1999 – Carlos Fuentes
- 2000 – Leopoldo Zea Aguilar
- 2001 – José Ezequiel Iturriaga Sauco
- 2002 – Héctor Fix Zamudio
- 2003 – Luis González y González
- 2004 – Carlos Canseco González
- 2005 – Gilberto Borja Navarrete
- 2006 – Jesús Kumate Rodríguez
- 2007 – Carlos Castillo Peraza (posthumous)
- 2008 – Miguel Ángel Granados Chapa
- 2009 – Antonio Ortiz Mena (posthumous)
- 2010 – Javier Barros Sierra (posthumous)
- 2010 – Luis H. Álvarez
- 2011 – Cuauhtémoc Cárdenas Solórzano
- 2012 – Ernesto de la Peña (posthumous)
- 2013 – Manuel Gómez Morín (posthumous)
- 2014 – Eraclio Zepeda
- 2015 – Alberto Bailleres
- 2016 – Gonzalo Miguel Rivas Cámara (posthumous)
- 2017 – Julia Carabias Lillo
- 2018 – Carlos Payán
- 2019 – Rosario Ibarra de Piedra
- 2020 – Personnel of the National Health System on the occasion of the COVID-19 pandemic
- 2021 – Manuel Velasco Suárez (posthumous) and Ifigenia Martínez Hernández
- 2022 – Elena Poniatowska
- 2023 – Ninfa Deándar

== See also ==
- Condecoración Miguel Hidalgo
- Orders, decorations, and medals of Mexico
