= Roberto Gil =

Roberto Gil is the name of:

- Roberto Gil (footballer), Spanish footballer
- Roberto Gil (politician), Mexican politician
