= María Hernández =

María Hernández may refer to:

- María Hernández Zarco (1889–1967), Mexican printer and revolutionary
- Maria L. de Hernández (1896–1986), Mexican-American rights activist
- María Julia Hernández (1939–2007), Salvadoran human rights advocate
- María Antonieta Hernández (born 1958), Mexican gymnast
- María Talavera Hernández (born 1964), Mexican politician
- María de la Paz Hernández (born 1977), Argentine field hockey player
- María Hernández (golfer) (born 1986), Spanish golfer
- María Hernández (swimmer) (born 2001), Nicaraguan swimmer

== See also ==
- Maria Hernandez Park, a municipal park in Brooklyn, New York City
