= María Lavalle Urbina =

First female president of the Mexican Senate

Belisario Domínguez Medal of Honor
- In office 1985–1985
- Preceded by: Salomón González Blanco
- Succeeded by: Salvador Zubirán

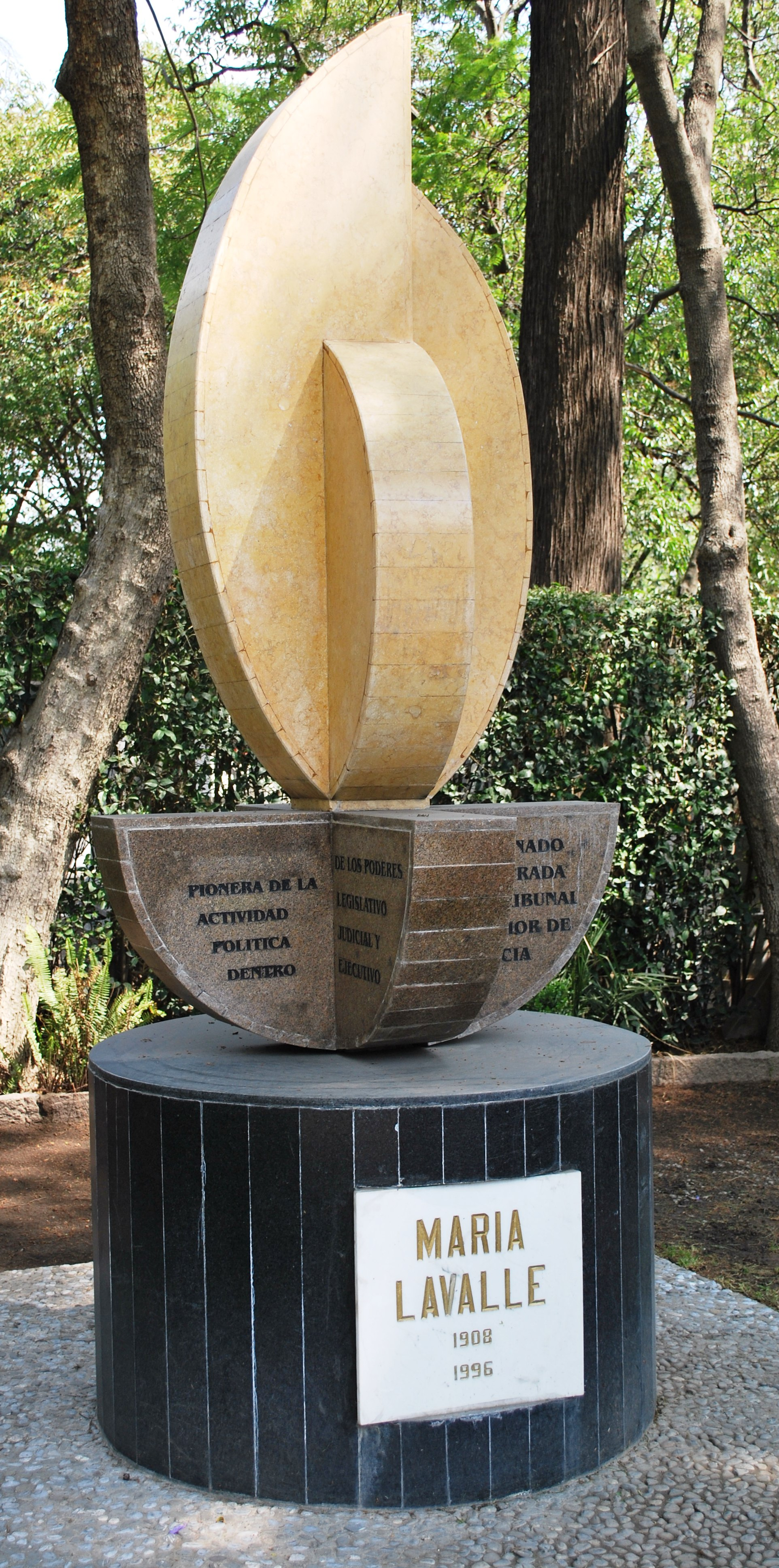
Tomb of Maria Lavalle in the Panteon Civil de Dolores cemetery in Mexico City

María Lavalle Urbina (Campeche, Campeche, May 24, 1908 - Mexico City, April 23, 1996) was a Mexican lawyer and politician who served as the first female president of the Mexican Senate.

== Early life ==
María Lavalle Urbina was born on May 24, 1908, in Campeche, Mexico. She was the daughter of don Manuel Covian and Esperanza Urbina Alfaro. Urbina had two brothers, Carlos Manuel, born in 1904, and Eduardo José, born in 1910. Lavalle and her siblings grew up in a very cultured environment. Don Manuel Covian was a native of Campeche and had studied law and pharmacology. He was a local deputy, a member of the judiciary, and the director of Periódico Official. Esperanza Urbina Alfaro was described by many as charming and as the "prototypical campechana matron" because of her beauty and altruism. Close friends of Maria Lavalle Urbina describe how influential her family and upbringing were to her development.

== Education and professional career ==
María Lavalle began her career as an elementary school teacher in 1926 at the age of 18. Later in her life, she studied law at the Autonomous University of Campeche, from 1940 to 1944, and received her bachelor's degree. A few years later she served as the first female judge of the Tribunal Superior de Justicia del Distrito y Territorios Federales (The Superior Court of the District and Federal Territories) from 1947 to 1954. Then, for ten years she was the head of the Departamento de Previsión Social de la Secretaría de Gobernación (the Department of Social Welfare of the Secretariat of the Interior), during the administration of President Gustavo Díaz Ordaz. In 1965, she became the first woman to occupy a seat in Mexico's Senate. As a lawyer, she held many other prominent positions such as Mexico's representative to the UN Commission on the Status of Women (1957-1968), Mexican delegate to the Inter-American Commission of Women of the OAS (1965), Member of the Partido Revolucionario Institucional (Institutional Revolutionary Party) since 1930, in which she served as the director of the national women's executive committee (1965-1971), Director of the Civil Registry of the Ministry of Governance (1970-1976), Secretary of Basic Education (1976-1980) and Director of the National Commission of Free Text Books of the Ministry of Education (1982-1996). She also contributed the following written work pertaining to the welfare of women and minors: Child Delinquency (1945), Delinquency of Minors (1949) and Legal Status of Mexican Women (1953).

== Awards and recognitions ==
Due to her exemplary work in advancing the cause of human rights, especially of women, Maria Lavalle Urbina has been the recipient of a great deal of awards. In her honor, the Mexican chapter of the World Association of Women Journalists and Writers created the Maria Lavalle Urbina national award. This specific award is given annually and is an integral aspect of the National Institute of Women. Maria was declared Woman of the Year in 1963. She was Mexico's representation in over forty international meetings. Maria has been honored with various awards, including the UN award for distinguished services rendered to the cause of human rights. This is especially notable because it was the first and only award ever given to a woman and would remain so until December 1973. She was also awarded the Belisario Domínguez Medal of Honor in 1965 for her extensive political achievements. Additionally, Maria received the United Nations Prize in the Field of Human Rights in 1976. Maria Lavalle Urbina is a fundamental part of Mexico's history. She was the first woman to engage politically in what was considered to be a man's world. She fought for women's rights and blazed the path for equality between the sexes.

== Death ==
María Lavalle Urbina on died April 23, 1996, in Mexico City. On November 28, 2006, the remains of Lavalle, Emma Godoy Lobato (a prominent journalist that promoted the defense of old age) and Dolores del Río (a famous Mexican actress) were interred at the Rotunda of Illustrious Persons. In this ceremony the memory of María was honored by the former Secretary of the Interior, Carlos María Abascal Carranza. The President of the Foreign Relations Committee of the Senate of the Republic also spoke at the ceremony, highlighting Urbina's terrific career as a lawyer and political figure. Urbina is one of only six women in the Rotunda of Illustrious Persons. After her death, the state of Campeche erected a statue in her name.

Preceded by Salomón González Blanco	Belisario Domínguez Medal of Honor; 1985	Succeeded by Salvador Zubirán
