= Carlos Canseco =

Mexican physician and philanthropist

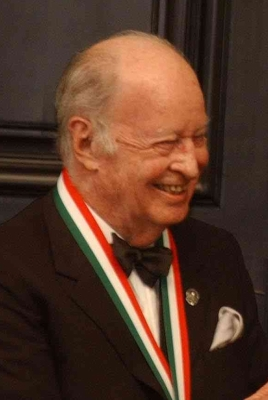
Carlos Canseco

Carlos Canseco González (March 17, 1921, in Tampico, Mexico – January 14, 2009, in Monterrey, Mexico) was a Mexican physician and philanthropist. In January 2002 he was honored as one of the "Public Health Heroes of the Americas" by the Pan American Health Organization.

Canseco graduated from the National Autonomous University of Mexico (UNAM) with a doctorate in medicine and specialized in allergy at the Northwestern University and in clinical immunology at the University of Pittsburgh in Pennsylvania, United States.

Back in Mexico he taught the first course of allergology at the University of Nuevo León (UANL) and raised money to build the first Children's Hospital in Monterrey.

In 1950 he co-founded the Monterrey Football Club and joined Rotary International, a philanthropic organization he chaired worldwide in 1984. As president of Rotary International and inspired by Francisco Balmis he launched an international campaign to eradicate polio by using an aerosol vaccination he co-developed with Albert Sabin in 1982.

Canseco served as Nuevo León's state secretary of health and has received honorary degrees from several universities including the Seoul National University in South Korea. On October 7, 2004 he received the Belisario Domínguez Medal from the Mexican Senate.

Canseco died on January 14, 2009, in Monterrey, Nuevo León. Leaving a legacy of knowledge and development in the Northern Capital.

Preceded by Luis González y González	Belisario Domínguez Medal of Honor; 2004	Succeeded by Gilberto Borja Navarrete
Non-profit organization positions
Preceded by William E. Skelton	President of Rotary International; 1984-1985	Succeeded by Edward F. Cadman
