= Enrique Jackson =

Mexican politician (1945–2021)

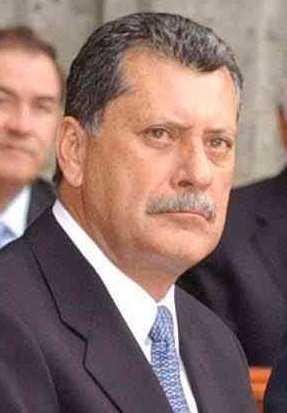

President of the Senate of Mexico
- In office 1 September 2005 – 31 August 2006
- Preceded by: Diego Fernández de Cevallos
- Succeeded by: Manlio Fabio Beltrones
- In office 1 September 2002 – 31 August 2004
- Preceded by: Diego Fernández de Cevallos
- Succeeded by: Diego Fernández de Cevallos
- In office 1 September 2000 – 31 August 2001
- Preceded by: Dionisio Pérez Jácome
- Succeeded by: Diego Fernández de Cevallos

Personal details
- Born: Jesús Enrique Jackson Ramírez; 24 December 1945 Los Mochis, Sinaloa, Mexico
- Died: 1 December 2021 (aged 75) Mexico City
- Party: PRI
- Occupation: Politician

Jesús Enrique Jackson Ramírez (Note: In this Mexican name, the surname is Jackson and the second or maternal family name is Ramírez.) (24 December 1945 – 1 December 2021) was a Mexican politician affiliated with the Institutional Revolutionary Party (PRI). In addition to holding numerous positions in his party he served in both chambers of Congress.

== Life ==
Jackson was born in Los Mochis, Sinaloa, in 1945. He studied for, but never received, a bachelor's degree in public administration from the National Autonomous University of Mexico (UNAM) and started a career in the federal bureaucracy and the PRI. He joined the party in 1970 and began his civil service career in the 1970s in agencies such as IDECO (1973–74) and the Secretariat of Labor (1977–83). Between 1983 and 1985, he was the director general of Liconsa, then a chapter of the Compañía Nacional de Subsistencias Populares (CONASUPO), which produced and distributed milk for social welfare programs.

From mid-1980s to the mid-1990s, before the introduction of direct elections of local officials in Mexico City, Jackson was appointed chief administrator (delegado) of Mexico City's Cuauhtémoc borough (1985–1988), took charge of the Federal District's security office (1988) and headed the public transportation authority (1989–1990). In 1998, he became the Federal District's secretary of government.

He also had a lengthy career in the PRI, holding many positions including director of the party's Institute for Political, Economic and Social Studies (1981), president of the PRI in the Federal District (1990–92), and president of Fundación Colosio, A.C. (1995).

He died on 1 December 2021, at the age of 75, while partaking of a steam bath at his club in Mexico City.

=== Legislative career ===
Jackson was elected to the Chamber of Deputies for the first time in 1997, for the 57th Legislature. He was the president of the first Political Coordination Board and sat on commissions dealing with the Federal District, Government, Constitutional Points, and National Defense, as well as an investigative commission that looked into the operations of CONASUPO.

Three years later, Jackson headed to the Senate for the 58th and 59th Legislatures, where he presided over the Board of Directors and the Political Coordination Board, making him one of the highest-ranking PRI members in the Senate.

During the first months of 2005, he participated in the PRI presidential primaries.

After 15 years, the PRI returned Jackson to San Lázaro as a proportional representation deputy from the first electoral region, representing his home state of Sinaloa, to the Chamber of Deputies to the 63rd Legislature. He sat on three commissions: Bicameral for National Security, National Defense, and Navy, and was the PRI's vice coordinator in the Chamber of Deputies. Additionally, he was designated as a representative from the Chamber of Deputies to the Constituent Assembly of Mexico City, which convened from September 2016 to January 2017. His selection was a replacement after the naming of another PRI proportional representation deputy, Carmen Salinas, prompted significant backlash.

== See also ==
- 2006 Mexican general election
