= Manlio Fabio Beltrones =

Mexican politician

Manlio Fabio Beltrones Rivera
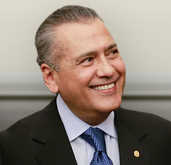

Governor of Sonora
- In office 22 October 1991 – 12 September 1997
- Preceded by: Rodolfo Félix Valdés
- Succeeded by: Armando López Nogales

President of the Senate of Mexico
- In office 1 September 2010 – 31 August 2011
- Preceded by: Carlos Navarrete Ruiz
- Succeeded by: José González Morfin
- In office 1 September 2006 – 31 August 2007
- Preceded by: Enrique Jackson
- Succeeded by: Santiago Creel

President of the Chamber of Deputies
- In office 1 September 2004 – 31 August 2005
- Preceded by: Juan de Dios Castro Lozano
- Succeeded by: Heliodoro Díaz Escarraga

Member of the Chamber of Deputies for Sonora's 4th district
- In office 1 September 1982 – 31 August 1985
- Preceded by: Rubén Duarte Corral
- Succeeded by: Bulmaro Andrés Pacheco Moreno

Personal details
- Born: August 30, 1952 (age 74) Villa Juárez, Benito Juárez Municipality, Sonora
- Party: Independent
- Other political affiliations: Institutional Revolutionary Party (1968-2024)
- Education: UNAM
- Profession: Economist
- Website: http://www.beltrones.com/Home

Manlio Fabio Beltrones Rivera (born August 30, 1952) is a Mexican economist and elected official, former member of the Institutional Revolutionary Party (PRI), a senator from Sonora since September 1, 2024, and a former federal deputy from September 1, 2012, to August 14, 2015. He was the president of the Senate during its 2006 to 2007 session and was reelected to that position for the 2010 to 2011 term. He served as Governor of Sonora from October 22, 1991, to September 12, 1997. He served two terms as federal deputy. He was the President of the Chamber of Deputies from 2004 to 2005. From 2015 to June 2016, he was the president of the Institutional Revolutionary Party.

== Career ==
From an early age, Beltrones entered public life. He joined the PRI at 18, while studying economics at the UNAM. In addition to his electoral posts, he was president of the PRI's state committee in Sonora (Presidente del Comité Directivo Estatal del PRI); Secretary of Government (Secretario de Gobierno); undersecretary of the federal Interior Ministry (Subsecretario de Gobernación) and Secretary General of the PRI's most influential membership branch, Confederación Nacional de Organizaciones Populares, or CNOP.

In 1981, Beltrones married Sylvia Sánchez. The two have one daughter, Sylvana Beltrones Sánchez, a proportional representation federal deputy for the PRI. She is married to Pablo Escudero Morales, a Green Party senator.

At the age of 39, he became governor of his native state. His term was distinguished by the construction of public projects in the state, even though the nation was going through a period of austerity. Finances in the state were the first to be audited and certified by professional auditing firms. In Sonora, he is particularly remembered for presiding over the creation of a new charter at the Universidad de Sonora. He has been an advocate of what is called the "new architecture of the Mexican state", a system under which all parties—as well as the Mexican public—have a voice in day-to-day policy-making. Beltrones has stated repeatedly that there can be no "untouchable" topics in Mexico's political arena and that the country deserves and requires a political class that encourages competitive policies that permit the country to prosper.

== 2012 presidential elections ==
Since 2010, it was speculated nationwide that he was going to seek his party's nomination for the 2012 presidential election. In 2011 various polls showed Beltrones leading the field of presidential candidates for the 2012 Mexican presidential election. However, on November 20, 2011, he announced that he was not doing so and this paved way for his fellow Institutional Revolutionary Party (PRI)'s president-elected Enrique Peña Nieto. Beltrones was widely expected to become the leader of PRI after its former president controversially stepped down in early December 2011.

== Later political career ==
Beltrones Rivera won election as one of Sonora's senators in the 2024 Senate election, occupying the first place on the Fuerza y Corazón por México coalition's two-name formula.

== Controversy ==
In 1994, incoming president Ernesto Zedillo requested that the United States provide his administration with the names of Mexican officials suspected of corruption who should not be considered for positions in the new administration. The United States indicated that Beltrones was suspected of using his power as governor of Sonora to protect drug lord Amado Carrillo Fuentes. Beltrones denied the allegations.

In March 2021 it was revealed that Sylvana Beltrones Sánchez, daughter of Manlio Fabio Beltrones, had deposited US$10.4 million in the Banca Privada d’Andorra (BPA) in Andorra when she was 26 years old. Now at 38 and a senator, Beltrones Sánchez explained that she and her mother had opened the account to deposit the US$2.8 million from the sale of apartments in Miami, although she did not explain where the other nearly US$8 million came from. In 2015 Andorran judge Canòlich Mingorance secretly investigated the senator, her mother, and her father for alleged money laundering. The investigation ended on October 18, 2018 at the request of the PGR.
