= Carlos Navarrete Ruiz =

Mexican politician affiliated with the Party of the Democratic Revolution

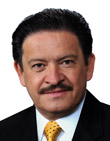

President of the Party of the Democratic Revolution
- In office 5 October 2014 – 6 November 2015
- Preceded by: Jesús Zambrano Grijalva
- Succeeded by: Agustín Basave Benítez

President of the Senate of Mexico
- In office 1 September 2009 – 31 August 2010
- Preceded by: Gustavo Madero Muñoz
- Succeeded by: Manlio Fabio Beltrones

Personal details
- Born: 26 September 1955 (age 70) Salvatierra, Guanajuato, Mexico
- Party: PRD (since 1989); PMS (1987–1989); PST (1975–1987)

Carlos Navarrete Ruiz (born 26 September 1955) is a Mexican politician affiliated with the Party of the Democratic Revolution (PRD). He served as Senator of the LX and LXI Legislatures of the Mexican Congress representing Guanajuato. He also served as Deputy in the LIV and LVI Legislatures.

From October 2014 until November 2015 he serves as President of the PRD.

Navarrete served in the LII Legislature of the Congress of Guanajuato via proportional representation from 1982 to 1985 as a member of the Workers' Socialist Party (PST).
