= Orders, decorations, and medals of Mexico =

The Mexican Honors system consists of civil orders, decorations and medals that are conferred on citizens and foreigners in recognition of their services and achievements. Although the indigenous empires that made up modern Mexico had their own way of recognizing individuals, the current system traces its roots from colonial New Spain, and has evolved because of events since the country's independence.

The following is a partial list of the orders, awards and prizes that have been or are currently issued as state decorations by the Government of Mexico.

== Mexican Empire ==
=== First Empire (1822–1823) ===
- Order of Guadalupe (First version)

=== Second Empire (1864–1867) ===
- Imperial Order of Guadalupe (renewed version)
- Imperial Order of the Mexican Eagle
- Imperial Order of Saint Charles

== United Mexican States ==
=== Current Honors ===
According to the Law on Prizes, Stimuli and Civil Rewards, Mexico's highest award for its own citizens is the Condecoración Miguel Hidalgo. Despite its presence in the law, there are no records of it being presented since 1979.

The Law also lists one Order for foreigners and 17 National Prizes, without specifying their order precedence. They are, by order of appearance:

- The Mexican Order of the Aztec Eagle, which is the highest award Mexico bestows on foreigners;
- The National Prize for Arts and Sciences;
- The National Demography Prize;
- The National Prize for Sports;
- The National Sporting Merit Prize;
- The National Civic Merit Prize;
- The National Labor Prize;
- The National Youth Prize;
- The National Community Service Prize;
- The National Seniority in Public Service Prize;
- The National Public Administration Prize;
- The National Forestry Merit Prize;
- The National Civil Defense Prize;
- The National Indigenous Labor and Culture Prize;
- The National Human Rights Prize;
- The National Nature Conservation Prize;
- The National Public Safety Prize;
- The National Ceramics Prize.

The Executive Branch of the Mexican Government, through its Secretariats, also issues lesser awards that are not governed by the Law on Prizes, Stimuli and Civil Rewards, such as the Ohtli Award issued by the Secretariat of Foreign Affairs.

The Legislative Branch, through the Senate, awards the Belisario Domínguez Medal of Honor, which is de facto the highest award issued by the Government to its citizens.

== See also ==
- Military decorations of Mexico
