= Diego Fernández de Cevallos =

Mexican politician

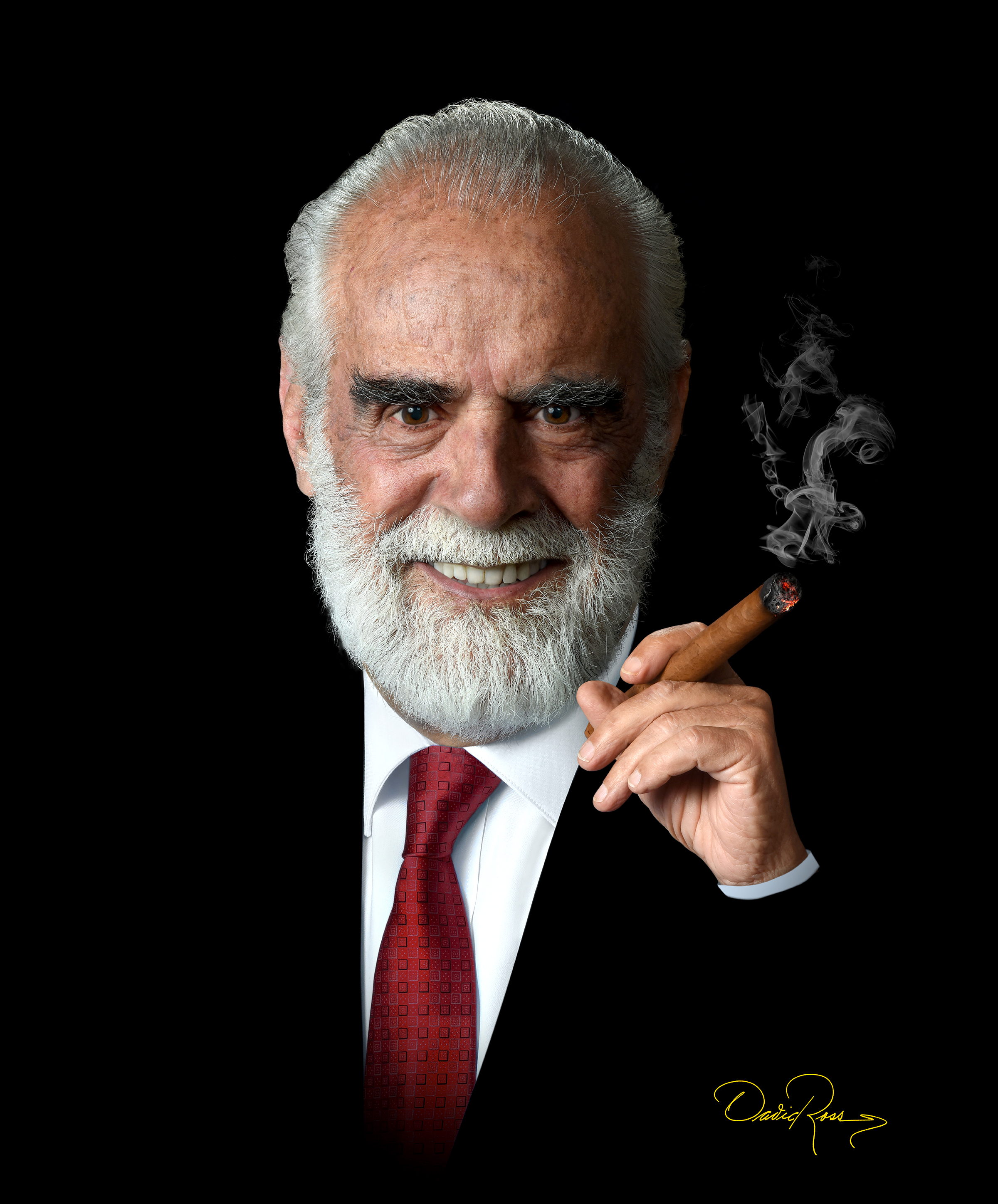
- Cevallos in 2019

President of the Senate of Mexico
- In office 1 September 2004 – 31 August 2005
- Preceded by: Enrique Jackson Ramírez
- Succeeded by: Enrique Jackson Ramírez
- In office 1 September 2001 – 31 August 2002
- Preceded by: Enrique Jackson Ramírez
- Succeeded by: Enrique Jackson Ramírez

Senator of the Republic Proportional representation
- In office 1 September 2000 – 31 August 2006

Member of the Chamber of Deputies Proportional representation
- In office 1 September 1991 – 31 August 1994

Personal details
- Born: Diego Fernández de Cevallos Ramos; 16 March 1941 (age 85) Mexico City, Mexico
- Party: National Action Party (1959-present)
- Domestic partner: Liliana de León Maldonado (since 2010)
- Children: 4
- Education: National Autonomous University of Mexico (LL.B)
- Occupation: Lawyer, politician
- Nickname: El Jefe Diego

Diego Fernández de Cevallos Ramos (Spanish pronunciation: [ˈdjeɣo feɾˈnandes ðe seˈβaʝos]; born 16 March 1941) is a Mexican lawyer and politician affiliated with the conservative National Action Party (PAN). He was a presidential candidate in the 1994 election and President of the Mexican Senate.

== Life and career ==
Fernández de Cevallos was born in Mexico City, the son of José Fernández de Cevallos Martínez and Beatriz Ramos Íñigo. He received a bachelor's degree in law from the National Autonomous University of Mexico (UNAM) and took several courses in economics at the Ibero-American University, where he also worked as a professor of criminal and commercial law.

He joined the conservative National Action Party (PAN) in 1959 and led its parliamentary group in the Chamber of Deputies (during the 55th legislature) and in the Senate (2003–06). In 1994 he ran for president representing his party and lost against the PRI candidate, Ernesto Zedillo Ponce de León.

Outside politics, Fernández de Cevallos runs an influential law firm specialized in criminal, civil and commercial law. He was married only by the religious rite to Claudia Gutiérrez Navarrete. Currently he lives with his partner Liliana de León Maldonado.

At 80 years of age Fernández de Cevallos decided to join social media in order to persuade young people to adopt conservative values. President Andrés Manuel López Obrador (AMLO) responded to Fernández de Cevallos' criticisms of his government by showing a video of a debate they had in 2000.

== Abduction ==
Fernández de Cevallos was abducted from one of his properties, located in Pedro Escobedo, Querétaro, on 14 May 2010. His abandoned vehicle was found nearby, with signs of a violent struggle. Fernandez de Cevallos' kidnappers demanded $100 million in exchange for his release, but decreased the amount. He was released from this abduction on December 20, 2010 in exchange for an amount that hasn't been officially disclosed by him or his family.

== See also ==
- List of kidnappings
- List of solved missing person cases (2010s)
- National Action Party (Mexico)
- Carlos Salinas de Gortari
- Videoscandals

Party political offices
Preceded by Manuel Clouthier	PAN presidential candidate 1994 (lost)	Succeeded by Vicente Fox
