= Pablo Escudero Morales =

Mexican politician

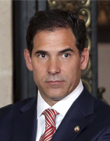

President of the Senate of Mexico
- In office 1 September 2016 – 31 August 2017
- Preceded by: Roberto Gil Zuarth
- Succeeded by: Ernesto Cordero Arroyo

Senator of the Congress of the Union from Mexico City
- In office 1 September 2012 – 1 September 2018
- Preceded by: Federico Döring
- Succeeded by: Emilio Álvarez Icaza

Member of the Chamber of Deputies from the Federal District
- In office 1 September 2009 – 31 August 2012
- Constituency: 4th electoral region

Personal details
- Born: 6 July 1973 (age 53) Mexico City, Mexico
- Party: PVEM
- Spouse: Sylvana Beltrones Sánchez
- Education: Anahuac University
- Occupation: Lawyer

Pablo Escudero Morales (born 6 July 1973) is a Mexican politician and lawyer. A member of the Ecologist Green Party of Mexico (PVEM), he is a former federal deputy and senator. From 2016 to 2017, he served as president of the Senate.

== Studies and professional career ==
Pablo Escudero graduated with a law degree from the Universidad Anáhuac and a master's in public administration from the National Institute of Public Administration in Madrid, Spain.

He began his career in public administration in 1997 as the coordinator of the program for the responsibilities of public servants of the Mexican Social Security Institute (IMSS). After leaving in 2000, he returned to the IMSS the next year as private secretary to the comptroller. After brief stints at Pemex and the Secretariat of the Civil Service, he moved to the National Human Rights Commission (CNDH), where from 2003 to 2005 he served as private secretary to CNDH president José Luis Soberanes Fernández; he then was the CNDH's secretary of administration until 2006 and senior officer of the institution from 2006 to 2009.

== Legislative career ==
In the 2009 mid-terms, he was elected to the Chamber of Deputies as a proportional representation deputy for the PVEM during the 61st Congress. In that legislative session, he was president of the Civil Service Commission and secretary of the Oversight Commission for the Superior Auditor of the Federation and National Defense Commission.

In 2012, he was nominated by the coalition of the Institutional Revolutionary Party (PRI) and PVEM as part of its senatorial ticket for the Federal District. The ticket placed second, and Escudero was elected as the minority senator from the Federal District for the 62nd and 63rd Congresses. He served as chair of the Anti-Corruption and Citizen Participation Commission and member of commissions on Human Rights, the Federal District and Constitutional Points.

On 31 August 2016, he was elected president of the Senate for a six-month term.

== Personal life ==
Pablo Escudero is married to Sylvana Beltrones Sanchez, daughter of PRI politician Manlio Fabio Beltrones.
