= Emma Godoy =

Mexican writer, radio personality and activist (1918–1989)

- Born: March 25, 1918; Guanajuato
- Died: July 30, 1989 (aged 71); Mexico City
- Resting place: Rotunda of Illustrious Persons
- Occupation: Writer; Radio personality; Activist
- Education: Escuela Normal Superior; National Autonomous University of Mexico; Sorbonne; École du Louvre
- Genre: Poetry; fiction; essays; art criticism
- Notable awards: Ibero-American Novel Award

Emma Godoy Lobato (25 March 1918 – 30 July 1989) was a Mexican writer, philosopher, psychologist, educator, radio personality and activist, best known for her literary contributions and her advocacy for the rights and dignity of the elderly in Mexico.

== Early life and education ==
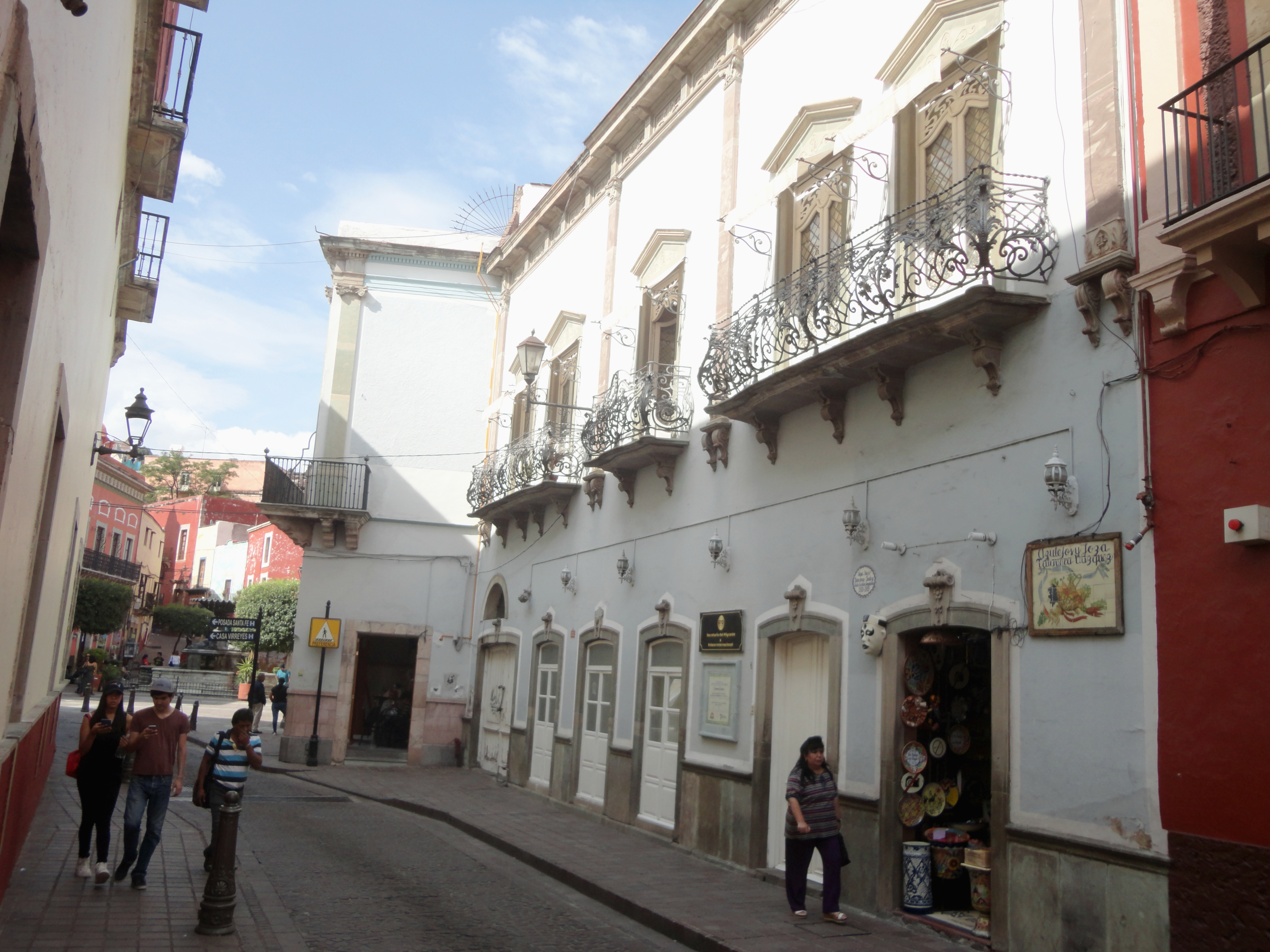
Emma Godoy's house in Guanajuato

She was born on March 25, 1918, in Guanajuato.

The daughter of Abigail Lobato and Enrique Godoy, she was the youngest of 15 siblings. She spent her early years in her hometown until, at the age of eight, she moved with her entire family to Mexico City, settling in the Popotla neighborhood. Her early fascination with storytelling was inspired by tales from her nanny Brígida.

After studying at the Institute of Feminine Culture (Spanish: Instituto de Cultura Femenina), Godoy earned a Master's degree in Spanish Language and Literature from the Escuela Normal Superior and a Doctorate in Philosophy from the National Autonomous University of Mexico (UNAM). She also studied Psychology and Pedagogy, took courses in Philosophy at the Sorbonne in Paris, and studied Art History at the École du Louvre.

== Professional work ==
She taught at several institutions, including the Escuela Normal Superior, the Universidad del Claustro de Sor Juana, and the Autonomous University of Guadalajara.

She was a member of the Mexican Society of Philosophy and the International Academy of Philosophy of Art. She was member of the board of the National Institute of Senility Spanish: Instituto Nacional de la Senectud), adviser for the Mexican Society of Philosophy (Spanish: Sociedad Mexicana de Filosofía) and honorary chairman of the Philosophy Ateneum of the Universidad Panamericana.

== Literary work ==
Emma Godoy was a writer of poetry, fiction, essays, and art criticism. Her writing often explored themes such as spirituality, solitude, eroticism, and existential anxiety. She published 18 books. Notable works include:

- Pausas y arena (1948)
- Caín el Hombre (1950)
- Érase un hombre pentafásico (1961)
- Sombras de magia (1968)
- La mujer en su año y en sus siglos (1975)
- El Arte de Envejecer (1975)
- El Tiempo y Yo (1980)
- Antología de la Vejez (1981)
- La mera verdad o ¿puros cuentos? (1985)
- Apocalipsis (1986)
- El secreto para amar (1989)

Her novel Érase un hombre pentafásico earned her the Ibero-American Novel Award from the William Faulkner Foundation in 1962.

Godoy contributed to several publications, including Ábside (1940), a cultural magazine; she also took part in The book and the people (Spanish: El libro y el Pueblo) in 1963; in Fine arts notebooks (Spanish: Cuadernos de Bellas Artes) in 1964; and in the supplement México in the High Culture (Spanish: México en la cultura) of the newspaper Novedades.

== Radio ==
Emma Godoy used radio to connect with people and share her ideas, especially about how older adults should be treated with respect and dignity. In the 1970s, she began giving talks on XEW, the best-known radio station in Mexico City.

She participated in the radio programs Daily Talks (Spanish: Charlas diarias), Our Home (Spanish: Nuestro Hogar), and The World of Women (Spanish: El mundo de la Mujer).

Her radio shows were friendly and easy to understand. She spoke about aging, how to stay emotionally healthy, and how people should keep learning and growing no matter their age. Her goal was to help older adults feel proud of who they are and to teach society to value their wisdom. Emma made complicated ideas simple, so everyone could understand and feel inspired. She became a voice for change, encouraging older people to take part in life and society.

Although there are few recordings of her programs, her radio work is still remembered. The Mexican Radio Institute (IMER) honored her in a podcast series called Autorretratos, showing how important her voice was on the air.

She also became popular through her radio program Dialogue between generations (Spanish: Dialogar entre generaciones), where she promoted dialogue between young and older generations, encouraging mutual respect and understanding.

== Advocacy for elder rights ==
In 1973, Emma Godoy founded and led Dignification of Old Age (DIVE) (Spanish: Dignificación de la Vejez), an association to promote the rights of the elderly, under the motto: "Old age should be teacher, advisor, and guide." Her efforts were instrumental in the creation of the first public institution dedicated to the care of old age: the National Institute for the Elderly (INSEN) by the Mexican government in 1979, which later became the National Institute for Older Adults (INAPAM). This institution continues to support and implement programs benefiting older adults in Mexico.

== Personal life ==
Emma Godoy never married and had no children.

In 1949 she met Chilean writer Gabriela Mistral, the recipient of the Nobel Prize in Literature in 1945, and the two became good friends. Gabriela and Emma shared the same last name: Gabriela Mistral was only a pseudonym, since her real name was Lucila Godoy Alcayaga. Mistral wrote letters to Godoy, visited her in Mexico, and dedicated poems to her. In 1968, as a homage 10 years after Mistral died, Emma published Antología de Gabriela Mistral : momentos de su vida y de su obra.

Godoy died on July 30, 1989, in Mexico City. In 2006, her remains were moved to the Rotunda of Illustrious Persons in the Panteón Civil de Dolores, in Mexico City. She is one of only eight women buried there, alongside Ángela Peralta, Virginia Fábregas, Rosario Castellanos, María Lavalle Urbina, Amalia González Caballero, María Izquierdo and Dolores del Río.

== Awards and recognition ==
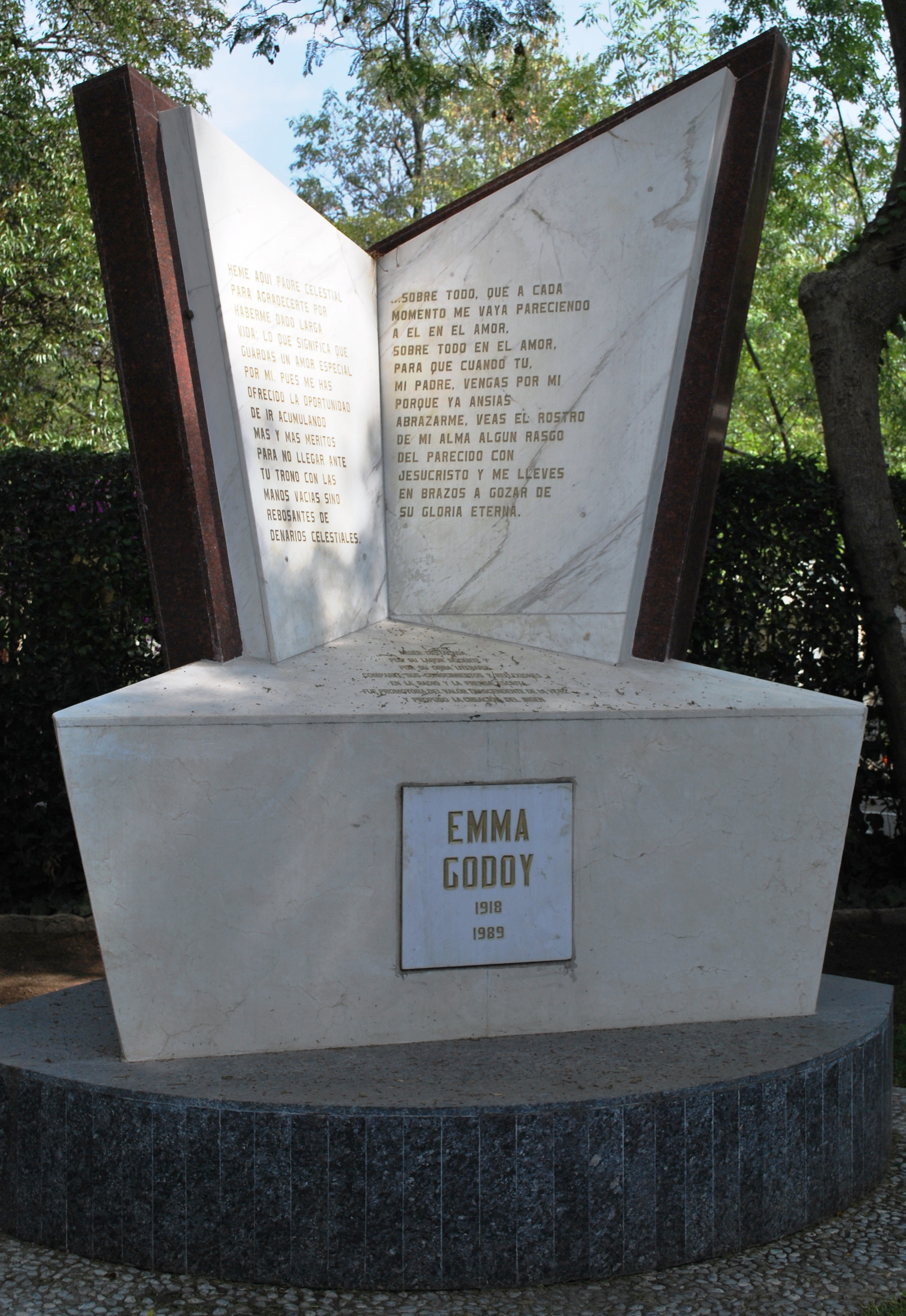
Tomb of Emma Godoy at the Panteón de Dolores

Emma Godoy's contributions were acknowledged both nationally and internationally:

- Ibero-American Novel Award (1962) — Awarded by the William Faulkner Foundation of the University of Virginia for her novel Érase un hombre pentafásico
- Sophia International Award (1979) — Presented by the Mexican Philosophy Atheneum (Spanish: Ateneo Mexicano de Filosofía)
- Eight Columns Award — Granted by the Autonomous University of Guadalajara
- Sor Juana Inés de la Cruz Award — Granted by the Mexican Women's Atheneum (Spanish: Ateneo Mexicano de Mujeres)

In 2006, in recognition of her significant contributions, her remains were transferred to the Rotunda of Illustrious Persons in Mexico City, a national honor reserved for distinguished individuals who have contributed to the nation's cultural, scientific, literary, civic, military, and political heritage.

Several elementary, middle schools and preschool are named after her.

On March 25, 2022, Google honoured Emma Godoy with a Doodle commemorating her 103rd birthday.
