= María Hernández Zarco =

Mexican revolutionary (1889–1967)

- Born: 8 August 1889; Mexico City, Mexico
- Died: 1967 (aged 77–78); Mexico City, Mexico
- Awards: Belisario Domínguez Medal

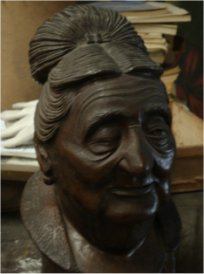
Bronze bust of María Hernández Zarco

María Hernández Zarco (8 August 1889 – 1967) was a Mexican printer notable for her participation in the Mexican Revolution. In 1963, the Senate of Mexico awarded her the Belisario Domínguez Medal for her contribution to the overthrow of Victoriano Huerta's dictatorship.

== Early years ==
María Hernández Zarco was born on 8 August 1889 in Mexico City. She was the eldest daughter of Vicente Hernández and María Zarco, who had four other children. She was a paternal granddaughter of the historian Juan E. Hernández y Dávalos and a maternal great-granddaughter of the journalist Francisco Zarco. Upon the death of her father in 1906, she began working as a printer in the printing press "La mujer Mexicana" of Luz Fernández, widow of Herrera, where she printed the newspaper La Voz de México and later the newspaper El Reformador, a publication directed by Andrés Molina Enríquez and Luis Cabrera Lobato.

== Mexican Revolution ==
María Hernández Zarco was a supporter of Francisco I. Madero, was affiliated with the liberal club "Benito Juárez" and was a founding member of the Casa del Obrero Mundial in 1912. After the Ten Tragic Days, the assassination of Madero and the establishment of Victoriano Huerta's dictatorship, many newspapers and printing houses opposed to the Huerta government were closed, including the newspaper El Reformador, which supported the Madero government. Hernández Zarco went to work for the printing house run by Adolfo Montes de Oca, a supporter of Félix Díaz. There she met Belisario Domínguez, senator for the state of Chiapas.

As a senator, Domínguez was noted for his criticism of Huerta's government. Because of his political stance, print shops in Mexico City refused to print his speeches for fear of being shut down by the government as other critical outlets had been. However, Hernández Zarco agreed to publish his speeches in secret, without informing Montes de Oca, who had also refused to support Domínguez. When Belisario Domínguez was assassinated in October 1913, Hernández Zarco decided to republish his speeches, redistributing them under the title Palabras de un muerto ("Words of a Dead Man"). As a result of this action, Hernández Zarco was persecuted by the Huerta government; she was forced into exile in Veracruz, where she remained until 1918.

== Later years ==
After the revolution, Hernández Zarco worked at the Talleres Gráficos de la Nación and the Secretariat of Public Education. She retired in 1947. She was recognized as a veteran in 1963 and received the Belisario Domínguez Medal from the Senate for her role in overthrowing Victoriano Huerta and for her support of the senator from Chiapas. She died in 1967.
