= National Public Administration Prize =

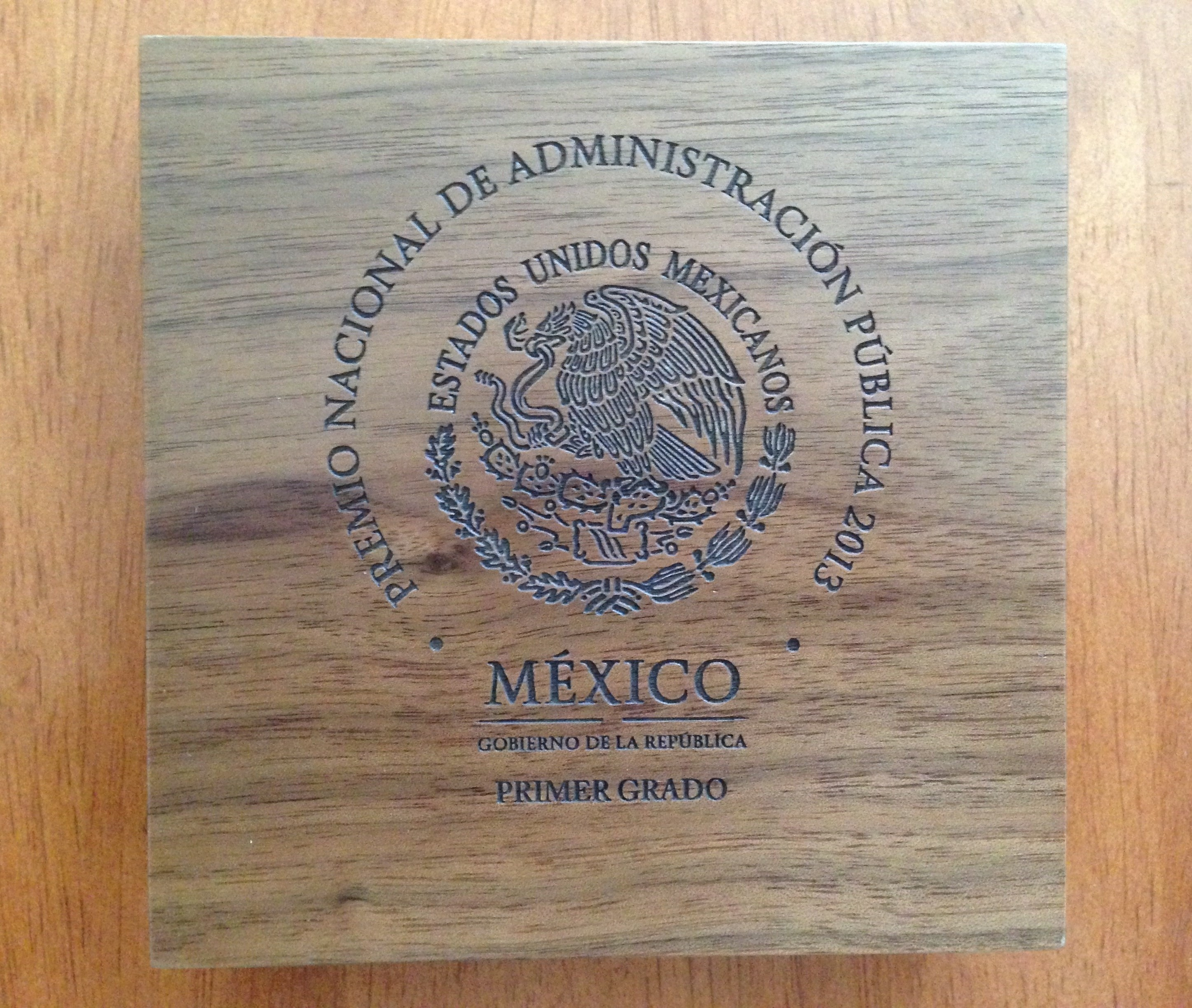
- 1st Class medal box of the XXXIII edition
- Type: 3-grade state decoration
- Awarded for: Improvement and innovation in government services
- Presented by: Mexico
- Eligibility: Mexican Civil Servants
- Status: Currently awarded
- Established: 1980
- First award: Lázaro Barajas Gutiérrez
- Final award: Alfonso de Alba Aguayo

Highlights
- Total: 33 of each of three classes
- Website: http://www.usp.funcionpublica.gob.mx/PNAP/
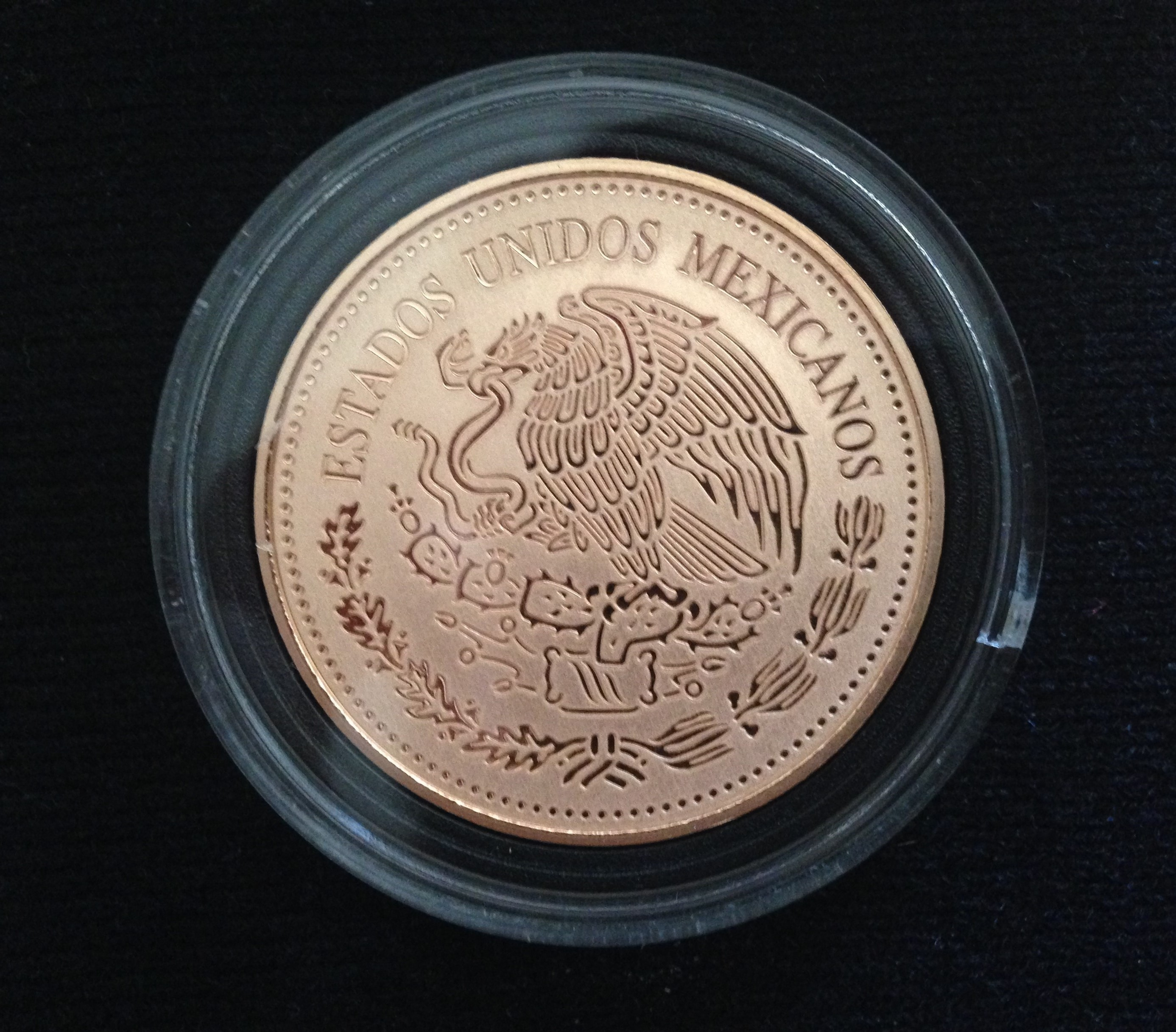
- Obverse of the 1st Class medal awarded in the XXXIII edition to Alfonso de Alba

The National Public Administration Prize (known in Spanish as the Premio Nacional Administración Pública or PNAP) forms part of the Mexican Honours System. It is, along with its corresponding Medal, the highest decoration that the country confers on its public servants for works that improve the functions of the nation's federal government.

== History ==
The Prize was established by decree of President José López Portillo following an Act of the Mexican Congress in 1980 and is governed by the country's federal law on awards. Since then, it has been Mexico's highest recognition to civil servants that have contributed substantially to improve federal services.

== Classes ==
The classes are :

1. 1er Grado ("1st Class"), with gold medal;
2. 2ndo Grado ("2nd Class"), with silver medal;
3. 3er Grado ("3rd Class"), with bronze medal.

Recipients of all grades receive a diploma, a lump sum determined annually by the President of Mexico, and have their names recorded on the Prize's Book of Honor.

== Design ==
As of the XXXIII award, all three classes of the medal feature the Coat of arms of Mexico engraved on the obverse and the grade, year and name of the serving President of Mexico on the reverse.

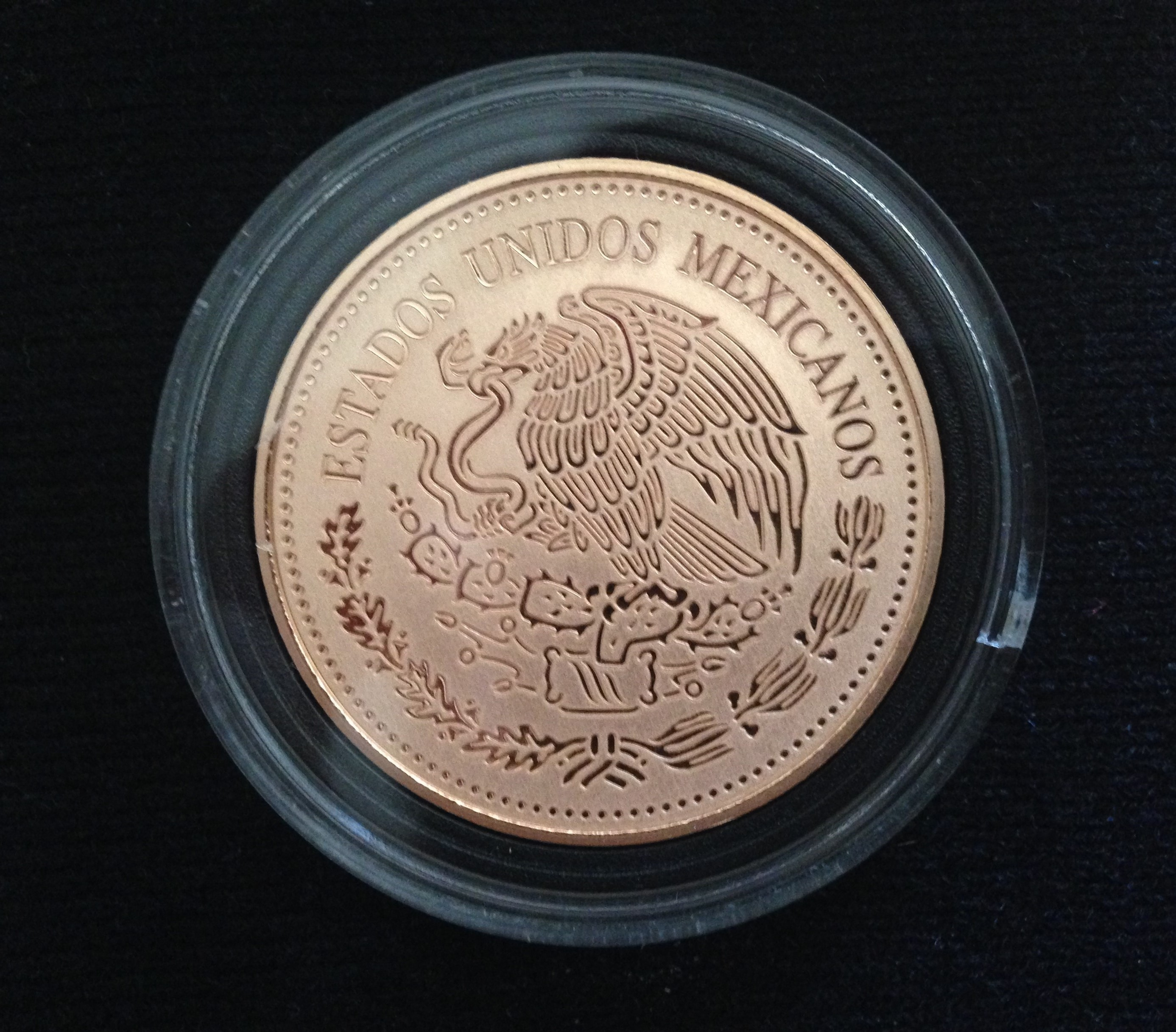
Obverse of the 1st Class Medal

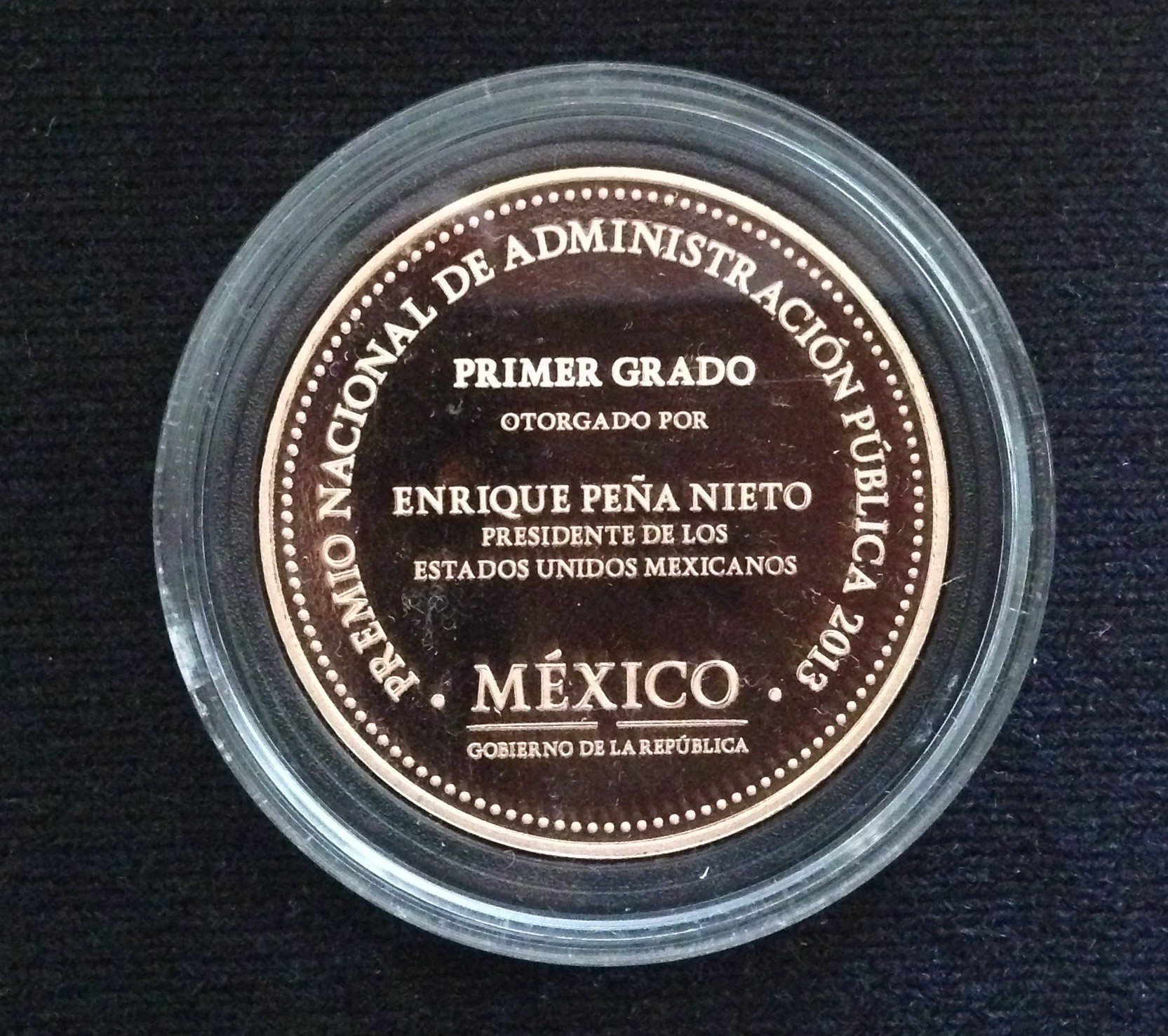
Reverse of the 1st Class medal

== Award Criteria ==
Award of the Prize is outlined by Mexico's Norma para otorgar el Premio Nacional de Administración Pública . Presently, the jury is presided by the head of Mexico's Ministry of Public Administration and is composed of representatives from the Office of the President and the National Institute of Public Administration.

The evaluating committee invites academics and specialized researchers from the country's higher education institutions to evaluate the works submitted by the public servants. In the 2013 edition, the institutions that participated in this process were the National Autonomous University of Mexico (UNAM), the Universidad Autónoma Metropolitana (UAM), the Latin American Social Sciences Institute (FLACSO), the Universidad Iberoamericana (UIA) and the Monterrey Institute of Technology and Higher Education (ITESM).

The invitation to participate is issued by each of the government ministries in July of each year, with works due by the last day of August. The Prize is traditionally awarded 5 December to commemorate the signing of the first charter of federal workers, but it has also been awarded on different dates, notably the 2013 edition.

== Recipients ==
A complete list of winners can be found at the Public Administration Ministry's website:Participantes ganadores del PNAP

The most recent winners have been:

- 1st Class: Alfonso de Alba Aguayo from the Secretariat of Foreign Affairs.
- 2nd Class: Brenda García Salazar y José Antonio Paredes Cortés from the Office of Sonoran Health Services, a dependency of the Secretariat of Health.
- 3rd Class: Andrés Aguayo Rico from the Office of Federal Roads and Bridges, a dependency of the Secretariat of Communications and Transportation.

== Additional Sources ==
- Mexican Chamber of Deputies. Ley de premios, estímulos y recompensas civiles (Law of civilian prizes, stimuli and awards). Text of the law as of 26 August 2014. (Pdf, in Spanish).
