= Roberto Gil Zuarth =

Mexican politician

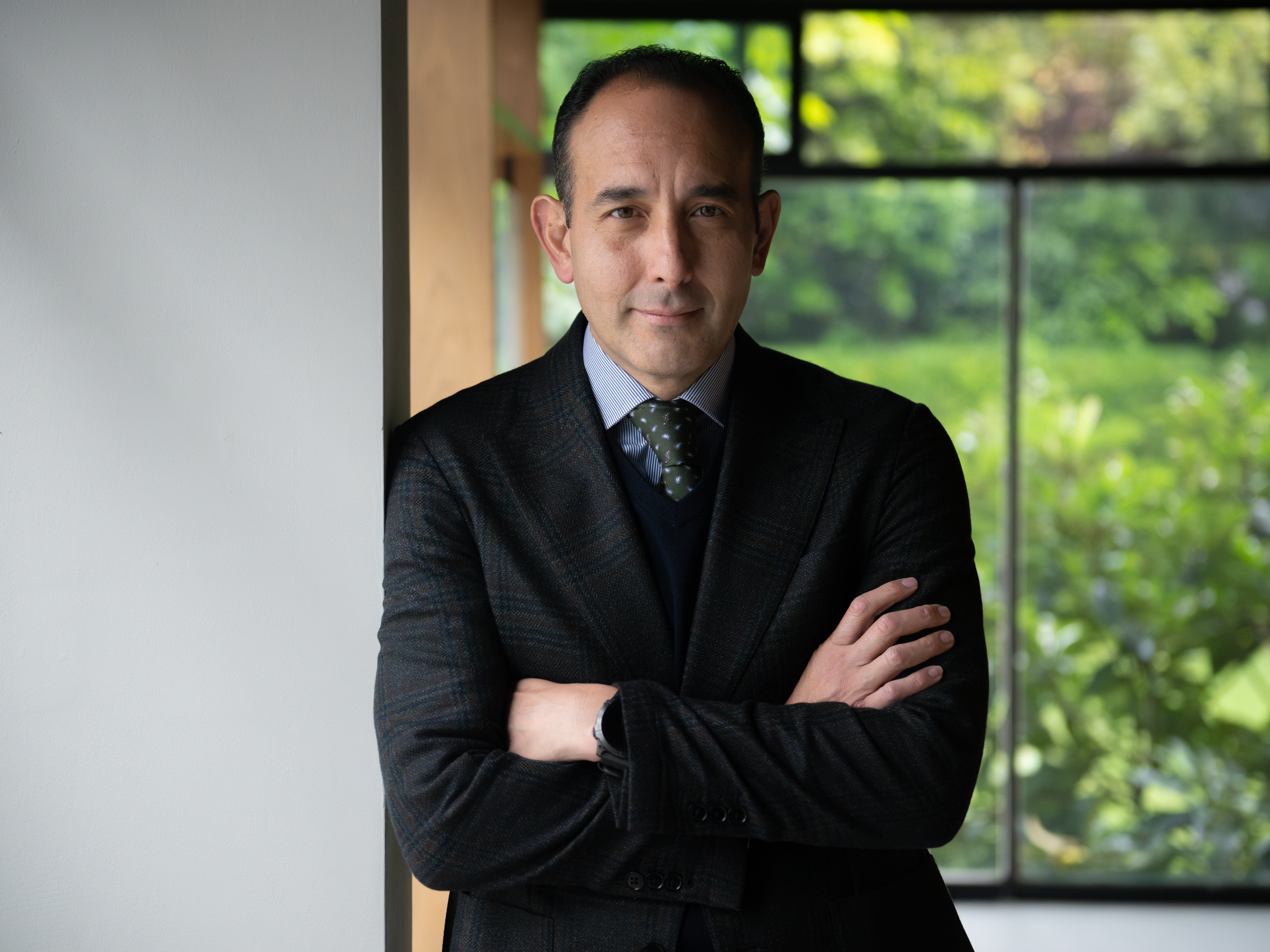

President of the Senate of Mexico
- In office 1 September 2015 – 31 August 2016
- Preceded by: Miguel Barbosa Huerta
- Succeeded by: Pablo Escudero Morales

Member of the Chamber of Deputies from Chiapas
- In office 1 September 2009 – 31 August 2012
- Constituency: 3rd electoral region

Personal details
- Born: 10 October 1977 (age 48) Villaflores, Chiapas, Mexico
- Party: PAN
- Occupation: Senator

Roberto Gil Zuarth (born 10 October 1977) is a Mexican politician affiliated with the PAN. He was Undersecretary of the Interior. He also served as Deputy between 2009 and 2011 during the 61st Legislature. He contended in 2010 for the presidency of the National Action Party against Gustavo Madero Muñoz. He was Private Secretary to Mexican President Felipe Calderón. He currently serves as Senator of the LXIII Legislature of the Mexican Congress.From 1 September 2015 to 31 August 2016, he was the President of the Mexican Senate.

== Early years and political career ==
Roberto Gil Zuarth studied law at the Instituto Tecnológico Autónomo de México, and has a master's degree in constitutional law by the Charles III University of Madrid being a candidate to a PhD in law by the same university.

He served as executive secretary of the Political Coordination Board in the Chamber of Deputies. He later served as technical secretary of the presidency of the executive board of the chamber.

He later became advisor to Alonso Lujambio, member of the general council of the Federal Electoral Institute. From December 2006 to September 2007, he was chief advisor to the Secretariat of the Civil Service, which was run at the time by Germán Martínez Cázares. He was named representative of the PAN to the General Council of the Federal Electoral Institute and later named attorney to the National Executive Committee of his Party.

In 2009, he was elected federal deputy for the PAN to the Mexican Chamber of Deputies. During this period he became undercoordinator of legislative process for the National Action Party's Parliamentary Group at the Chamber, as well as Secretary in the Budget and Public Accounts Committee. He was also secretary of the Special Committee for the analysis of the Tax Expenditure Budget, and a member of the Constitutional Affairs Committee.

He requested license from his charge as deputy in 2010, when he was named Undersecretary of the Interior of the Secretariat of the Interior. In January 2011, he was named Private Secretary of Mexican President Felipe Calderón.

He resigned a year later to become general coordinator of the National Presidential Campaign of Josefina Vázquez Mota, candidate of the PAN to the Mexican Presidency in the 2012 general elections. On those same elections he won a seat as Senator of the Republic.

He is the author of several academic articles and essays on topics such as constitutional law, electoral law, and parliamentary law. He was a weekly columnist of Mexican journal Excélsior, until he became President of the Senate.

In 2013, the ITAM gave him the Professional Merit Award of the Public Sector, an award given every year to former alumni with distinguished professional careers.

== Other activities ==
He has worked as an academic in the Universidad Anáhuac México Sur, teaching constitutional processes and political theory. Since May 2005, he was the academic coordinator of the program on electoral law of the ITAM.

Since 2005, he is member of the Mexican Network for a Democracy of Quality. He has been advisor to the Unit for the Promotion of Democracy of the Organization of American States in the regional project of better parliamentary practices (2003), advisor to the Inter-American Development Bank in the program of institutional strengthening of the Congress of the Republic of Peru, advisor of the United Nations Development Program (UNDP), and of the Mexican Representation in the State University of New York (SUNY).

== Publications ==
Books

- "La inhabilitación de partidos políticos". /In/ TENORIO, Manuel (coord.). Constitucionalismo mexicano. Planteamientos en la forma y estructura. Aportaciones para el estudio de las reformas estructurales. México: Editorial Porrúa-Universidad Anáhuac México Norte, 2009, pp. 99–117.
- "Estado social y democrático de Derecho: las implicaciones jurídicas de la fórmula". /In/ VALADÉS, Diego; CARBONELL, Miguel. El Estado constitucional contemporáneo. Culturas y sistemas jurídicos comparados, tomo I, México: Universidad Nacional Autónoma de México, 2006, pp. 351–373.
- "Mecanismos parlamentarios para la gobernabilidad democrática". /In/ PAOLI, Francisco (coord.) Memorias del Foro Interamericano sobre Modernización Legislativa México: Cámara de Senadores, 2005.
- "Balance de la LVII Legislatura" (with Nelly Arocha and José María Lujambio). /In/ PAOLI, Francisco (coord.) La Cámara de Diputados en la LVII Legislatura. México: Cámara de Diputados, 2000.
- "Breves consideraciones sobre la Ley de Justicia Indígena del Estado de Quintana Roo". /En/ Anuario de Derecho Público. El Federalismo hoy, núm. 2, Mc. Graw Hill – ITAM, México, 1998.

Magazine articles

- "Institucionalización en reversa. La nueva legislatura frente a la modernización de la Cámara de Diputados". In Este País, number 123, June 2001, pp. 21–26.
- "Reglamento de debates: reflexiones en torno a un galimatías constitucional". /In/ Quórum Legislativo, number 83, October–December 2005, pp. 181–192.
- "Filemón y el Tribunal Electoral". /In/ Voz y voto, number 190, December 2008, pp. 48–50.
- "Entre el chantaje y la medicina". /In/ Voz y voto, number 256, June 2014.
