= Miguel González Avelar =

Mexican politician

Miguel González Avelar (March 19, 1937 – November 22, 2011) was a Mexican politician who served as the Secretary of Public Education from 1985 to 1988 within the government of President Miguel de la Madrid. He died from heart and kidney failure on November 22, 2011, at the age of 74.
