= Eduardo García Máynez =

Eduardo García Máynez (January 11, 1908 – September 2, 1993) was an academic, jurist, and philosopher of Mexican law. He was a member of the National College, managing Director of Instituto Tecnologico Autonomo de Mexico, teacher at National Autonomous University of Mexico, General Secretary and researcher at Instituto de Investigaciones Filosoficas and writer of books on law.
