= Michoacán =

State of Mexico

Michoacán Michhuahcān (Nahuatl languages)
- State
- Free and Sovereign State of Michoacán de Ocampo; Estado Libre y Soberano de Michoacán de Ocampo; Tlahtohcayotl Michhuahcān
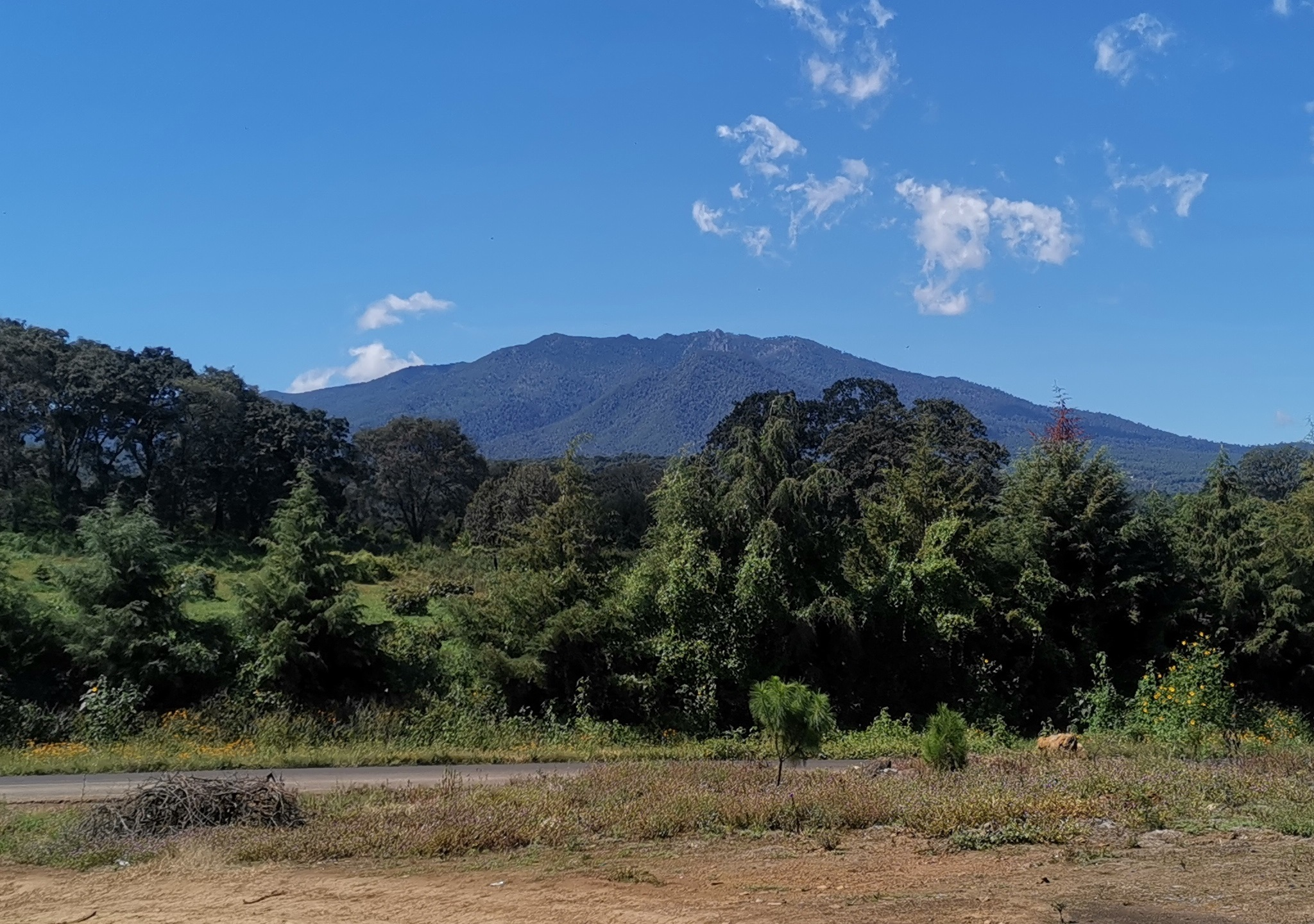
- View of Cerro Patamban

- Coat of arms
- Mottoes: Heredamos Libertad, Legaremos Justicia Social 'We Inherited Freedom, We Will Bequeath Social Justice'; El alma de Mexico 'The soul of Mexico'
- State of Michoacán within Mexico
- Coordinates: 19.21°N 101.91°W
- Country: Mexico
- Capital and largest city: Morelia
- Municipalities: 113
- Admission: December 22, 1823
- Order: 5th

Government
  - Governor: Alfredo Ramírez Bedolla
  - Senators: Cristóbal Arias Solís; Blanca Estela Piña Gudiño; Antonio García Conejo
  - Deputies: Federal deputies: • 14; • 3; • 2; • 1; • 1

Area
  - Total: 58,599 km^{2} (22,625 sq mi)
- Ranked 16th
- Highest elevation: 3,840 m (12,600 ft)

Population (2020)
  - Total: 4,748,846
  - Rank: 9th
  - Density: 81.040/km^{2} (209.89/sq mi)
  - Rank: 13th
- Demonym: Michoacano (a)

GDP
  - Total: MXN 700 billion (US$34.8 billion) (2022)
  - Per capita: US$7,066 (2022); 27th of 32
- Time zone: UTC−6 (CST)
- Postal code: 58–61
- Area code: Area codes: • 1; • 2; • 3
- ISO 3166 code: MX-MIC
- HDI: ▲0.758 high Ranked 27th of 32
- Website: michoacan.gob.mx

Michoacán, (Note: English: /mɪˌtʃoʊəˈkɑːn/ mih-CHOH-ə-KAHN, Spanish: [mitʃo.aˈkan] or [mitʃwaˈkan]; Nahuatl: Michhuahcān [mit͡ʃˈwaʔkaːn]; Western Highland Purepecha: P'uɽempo.) formally Michoacán de Ocampo, (Note: Spanish: [mitʃo.aˈkan de oˈkampo, mitʃwaˈkan -].) officially the Free and Sovereign State of Michoacán de Ocampo, (Note: Spanish: Estado Libre y Soberano de Michoacán de Ocampo; Nahuatl: Tlahtohcayotl Michhuahcān.) is one of the 31 states which, together with Mexico City, compose the Federal Entities of Mexico. The state is divided into 113 municipalities and its capital city is Morelia (formerly called Valladolid). The city was named after José María Morelos, a native of the city and one of the main heroes of the Mexican War of Independence.

Michoacán is located in western Mexico, and has a stretch of coastline on the Pacific Ocean to the southwest. It is bordered by the states of Colima and Jalisco to the west and northwest, Guanajuato to the north, Querétaro to the northeast, the State of México to the east, and Guerrero to the southeast.

The name Michoacán is from Nahuatl Michhuahcān, from michhuah [ˈmit͡ʃwaʔ] 'possessor of fish' and -cān [kaːn] 'place of' and means "place of the fishermen", referring to those who fish on Lake Pátzcuaro. In pre-Hispanic times, the area was the home of the Purépecha Empire, which rivaled the Aztec Empire at the time of Spanish encounter. After the Spanish conquest, the empire became a separate province which became smaller over the colonial period. The state and its residents played a major role in the Mexican War of Independence.

Today, the state is still home to a sizable population of Purépecha people as well as minor populations of Otomi and Nahua. The economy is based on agriculture, ranching, fishing, mining, and the arts. The major tourism draw for the state is the Lake Pátzcuaro–Tzintzuntzan–Quiroga area, which was the center of the Purépecha Empire; as well as the location of the Tzintzuntzan yácata pyramids. The national and state parks which include the winter grounds of the monarch butterflies (Mariposas Monarca) are located here. Michoacán is known for its Spanish colonial towns. In 1991, Morelia was declared an UNESCO World Heritage Site for its well-preserved colonial buildings, pink stone cathedral, historic center, and aqueduct. Michoacán has ten Pueblos Mágicos; such as the towns of Pátzcuaro and Santa Clara del Cobre.

Day of the Dead celebrations in some parts of Michoacán, such as the towns of Janitzio and Pátzcuaro, are often considered to be the most elaborate and famous in all of Mexico. The famous Parícutin volcano, which is one of the Seven Natural Wonders of the World, is located near the city of Uruapan. The state is known as "the soul of Mexico".

== History ==
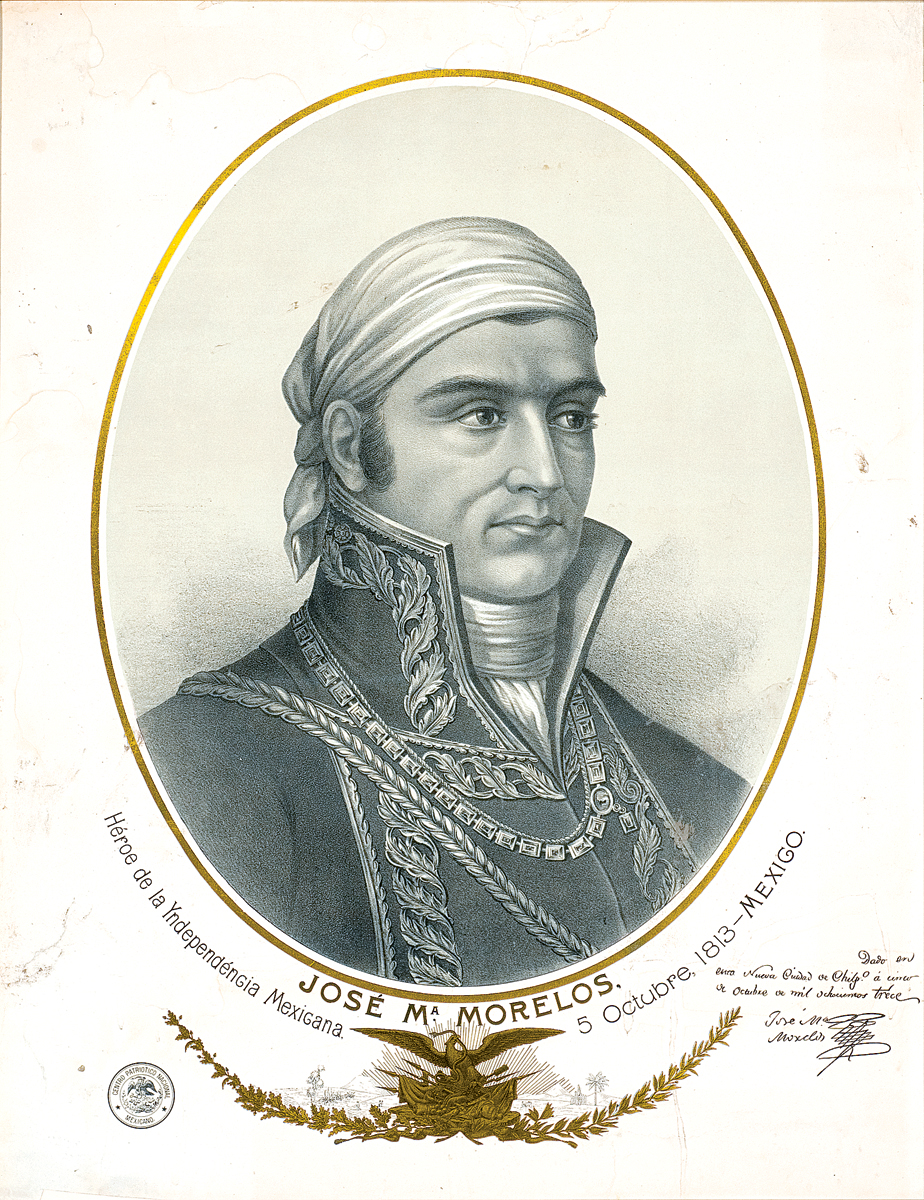
Catholic priest and insurgent leader José María Morelos

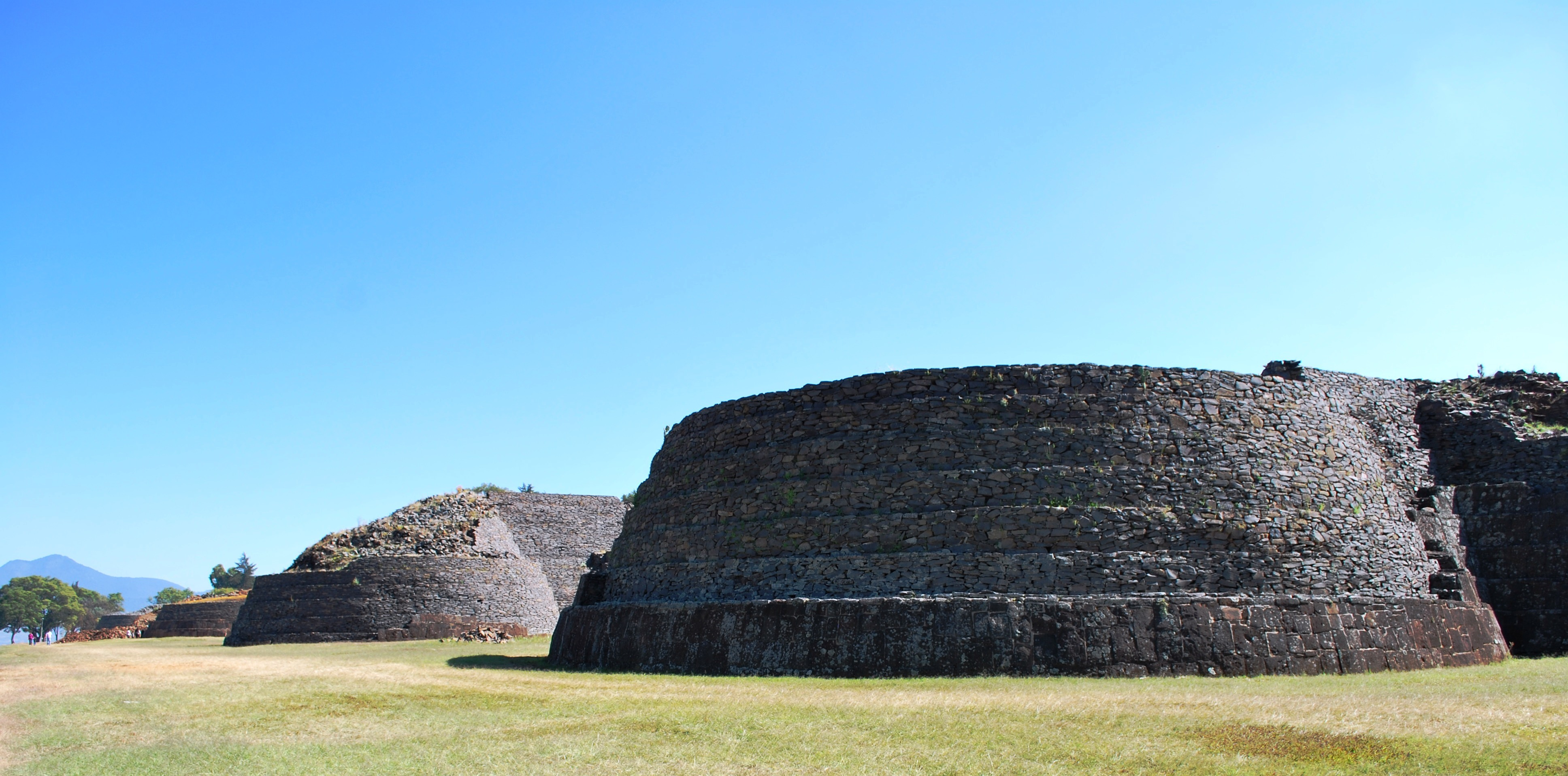
Yacata pyramids of Tzintzuntzan

=== Lithic period ===
The earliest human settlement of the Michoacán region started during the Palaeoindian or Lithic period, pre-dating c. 2500 BC, and carried out by small groups of hunter-gatherers, as evidenced by fluted projectile points and other stone tools found together with remains of mammoths and bison.

Most documentation for this human occupation during this period is from the basin of Lake Chapala, although similar activities also happened in the late Pleistocene lakes of the region, such as Cuitzeo, Zacapu, and maybe Pátzcuaro.

=== Archaic Period ===
There are barely any known remains of the Archaic period from Michoacán, with preceramic deposits from c. 2500 to c. 2200 BC being attested from the Los Portales Cave in conjunction with waste flakes of basalt and obsidian, one projectile point, and one mano.

=== Preclassic period ===
The Preclassic population of Michoacán lived in agricultural villages, especially located in El Opeño in the west and the basin of the Balsas river in the south.

The remains of these first societies to produce ceramics suggest that the Michoacán region was occupied with various localised cultures with their own histories and dynamics of interaction with their neighbours and with each other. This diversity of cultures would remain the norm in the Michoacán region until the rise of the Purépecha Empire.

The formative culture of El Opeño dates from c. 1500 to c. 800 BC, and performed a burial cult whose remains consist of tombs including ceramic vessels, figurines, and the burial shafts themselves, suggesting that this culture interacted along the Santiago-Lerma river with more western cultures in Jalisco and Nayarit, as well as with other cultures to the east.

In the middle and lower basin of the Balsas river were El Infiernillo villages whose ceramics suggest ties to the Capacha culture of Colima and the Pacific coast from Nayarit to Guerrero.

Remains of domesticated maize pollen from c. 1500 BC suggests that Michoacán was more densely inhabited during the Early and Middle Preclassic than attested by the archaeological evidence.

During the late Preclassic period, at least three regional cultures existed in Michoacán:

- the Chupícuaro culture of the northern and central zones, along the drainage of the middle Lerma river in northern Guanajuato, the Cuitzeo basin, and some localised variants near Morelia and in the Zacapu and Pátzcuaro basins
  - were adapted to lake environments, and built their villages on islands in marshes or along lake shores or rivers;
- the Chumbícuaro culture of the Tepalcatepec basin in the south west,
- and the Balsas/Mezcala culture in the central Balsas basin to the south.

These cultures were each defined by small village societies, and they have been distinguished from each other by differences in the ceramics associated with their respective burials.

=== Classic Period ===
Over the course of the Late Preclassic and Early Classic periods, the sites of Santa Maria near Morelia, Loma Alta in the Zacapu basin, and Chehuayo in the Cuitzeo basin, experienced developments such as changes in the style of ceramics and public architecture becoming more complex, with sunken patios and platforms.

At the Loma Alta site, there were some sherds of Thin Orange pottery, cloisonné, and an uncommon necropolis which had been repeatedly reused and where four types of burial had been performed.

By the 1st centuries AD, social ranks existed in the larger settlements, although their location on the floor of lake basins and their absence in defensible positions suggests there was barely any aggression or population movements.

During the Classic period, three regionally distinct cultures existed in Michoacán which nonetheless were related to nearby areas in the south and west:

- the presence of Chupícuaro-type or similar artefacts along the upper Lerma river in the Toluca basin attests of significant but indirect links existed between northern Michoacán and Central Mexico,
- during c. 100 BC to c. 100 AD, the Chumbícuaro existed in the plain of Apatzingán,
- the Balsas/Mezcala culture was located along the central Balsas river.

==== Development of ceremonial centres ====
Between c. 400 and c. 900 AD, an important cultural transformation happened in Michoacán in the form of the appearance of ceremonial centres where village societies had been the norm. The ceremonial centres from this period were widely spread out throughout Michoacán, and included the ones at El Otero near Jiquilpan, Tres Cerritos near Cuitzeo, and minor ones at Queréndaro and/or Zinapécuaro in the Cuitzeo basin, and Tingambato near the Pátzcuaro basin. These ceremonial centres were separated from each other by lands inhabited by populations continuing to live in village societies while also interacting with these ceremonial centres.

Concurrent with this development, the Zacapu basin experienced significant population growth, with the number of sites doubling during the Jaruacuaro phase (c. 600 to c. 700 AD), and again during the Lupe phase (c. 700 to c. 850 AD), so that by the La Joya phase at the end of the Late Classic Period (c. 850 to c. 900 AD), there were 58 sites. The settlements of this period were also located away from the lakeshore, especially in the area between Zacapu and the Lerma river, and they included pyramids, plazas and ball courts. A deeply buried irrigation canal in the Pátzcuaro basin from the Lupe-La Joya phase suggests an intensification of agriculture.

The major centres of this period contained architectural structures and artefacts suggesting they were in direct contact with the Teotihuacán culture of the Mexico basin:

- at El Otero were present a ball court, plazas and pyramids, stucco painting, and large group tombs, including one where were buried 42 individuals along with jade, rock crystal, pyrites, and turquoise;
- at Tres Cerritos were three large mounts and two sunken plazas, with the largest structure there including talud-tablero and at least two large tombs, of which one contained 20 individuals together with 120 vessels, marine shell, jade, turquoise, rock crystal, and an alabaster Teotihuacán mask;
- at Tingambato, dating possibly from c. 800 to c. 900 AD, were a series of plazas, altars, a central pyramid, a ball court, and large tombs where were buried at least 30 to 40 people together with a cloisonné-decorated vessel, marine shell, and mosaic disks inlaid with pyrites, jadeite, jade and turquoise, while six of the male burials exhibited dental mutilation; the talud-tablero of the pyramid and plazas showed links to central Mexico, although most of the ceramics were local.

Outside of the ceremonial centres, a few sites from the Lerman river to the Cuitzeo basin to the middle of the Balsas river contained Thin Orange pottery, cloisonné decoration, mosaic disks, Teotihuacán-like figurines, and sometimes talud-tablero architecture.

The number of Central Mexican-type artefacts is low in all these settlements, and they represent only a small part of material goods linked with the central Mexican Classic period culture: thus, while dental mutilation is attested at Tingambato, its variety is limited compared to those of Central Mexico, and for example dental incrustation was absent in Michoacán.

The significance of these new ceremonial centres and the presence of Teotihuacán-type artefacts there is still uncertain. Because most of the research on them was of salvage nature, none of the deposits at the large centres has been dated more precisely to between c. 400-900 AD, meaning that:

- they might be from the Middle Classic and show that the local population worked significantly with the economic network from Teotihuacán;
- or they may be from the Epi-Classic period (c. 700-900 AD) and originated among elites, priests or artisans who moved out of the Mexico basin as a result of the collapse of Teotihuacán and brought aspects of their culture with them;
- or they may have resulted from a combination of both processes, in addition to the independent formation of complex societies in Jalisco during the Classic Period.

The strongest evidence suggests that these came about due to interaction between Teotihuacán along the Balsas river during the Middle Classic Period, as well as central Mexican interaction with central and northern Michoacán after c. 600 AD. Therefore, the presence of Thin Orange pottery, a Teotihuacán mask, and "al fresco" decoration on some sherds at Loma Alta in the Zacapu basin are not linked with any significant changes in settlement pattern or ceramic style during the Loma Alta and Jaracuaro phases (c. 0-600 AD), while observable changes in settlement patterns and ceramic styles are instead linked to populations moving from the lakeshore sites to the area between Zacapu and the Lerma river, meaning that the central Mexican elements entering Michoacán might have done so via Classic Period populations in southern Guanajuato instead of directly through the east.

As a result of these contacts, the process of social differentiation which was already happening accelerated, and the formation of polities occupying discrete territories and competing to access inter-regional and intra-regional trade to the east and west intensified. By c. 800 AD, regions of northeastern Michoacán were interacting directly with central Mexico, which in turn intensified the increased output of the obsidian mines at Zináparo.

=== Postclassic Period ===
The changes in Michoacán continued so that by c. 900 AD they had caused major changes in settlement patterns: populations became concentrated at defensible locations in the Cuitzeo and Zacapu basins, as well as along the Lerma and Balsas rivers, with this process continuing until the formation of the Purépecha state.

Along with these changes in settlement patterns, the local population adopted red-on-cream ceramics on a widespread basis, integrating them with local pottery traditions. These ceramic style shifts are known from a wide part of northern and central Michoacán, including Zinapécuaro, Cuitzeo, Tiristaran, Morelia, Teremendo, Zacapu, Lake Pátzcuaro, Carapan, Zamora, and Tangamendapio. Polychrome pottery with negative decoration resembling the pottery of Guanajuato was already present at the site of Urichu in the Pátzcuaro basin by c. 400 AD, and after c. 900 AD these polychrome ceramics became more common. The ceramics of the future Purépecha would be derived from the polychrome pottery which became widespread in Michoacán after c. 900 AD.

Metallurgy was introduced in Michoacán during the early Postclassic Period by merchants from southern Ecuador who participated in the canoe trade through the Santiago-Lerma and Balsas-Tepalcatepec rivers. Metal objects from this time is known only from burial, and was made of copper and an alloy of copper and silver through cold hammering, annealing, and lost-wax casting in styles and object types known from earlier coastal Ecuador.

During the early and middle Postclassic Period, the local elites of Michoacán competed for communities and they marked their relative success with polychrome pottery, metal goods, and patron deities. Due to the lack of regional authority which possessed decision-making power while the populations were increasing, populations became extremely concentrated in some regions, such as at Zacapu, where 20,000 people and 13 sites occupied 11 kilometres square of the malpais, but the lake marsh below it was not inhabited.

During the middle and late Postclassic Period, the societies of Michoacán had little direct interaction with central Mexico, instead participating in regional cultures and sharing traits and beliefs which would later be typical of the Purépechas, and some of which might have arrived from further west along the Santiago-Lerma river system, while others were results of local cultural changes. Changes during this period included:

- the development of more complex metallurgy,
- ceramic pipes becoming more abundant,
- the presence of polychrome pottery with negative decoration,
- the building of mounds filled with rubble which were clustered into plazas on hillslopes and malpaís,
- and the presence of petroglyphs which were later associated with the Purépecha solar god of hunting, Curicaueri.

Sites which were already occupied at this period were later considered as sacred by the Purépecha.

At this time, new metalworking techniques and styles were introduced from Ecuador via the coastal trade routes. These new forms of metallurgy included loop-eye needles, axe money made of sheet metal, and wirework bells which were worked hot. New alloys were also produced, such as regular bronze and arsenical bronzes made of copper and arsenic or copper, tin and arsenic.

During the late Postclassic Period, a migration of Chichimeca hunters (especially deer hunters) and gatherers of Nahua ethnicity arrived into central Michoacán, among whom were the Uacúsecha (lit. 'eagles') who would become the royal dynasty of the Purépecha Empire. These migrants settled in discrete communities in and near the Pátzcuaro basin where already lived the Purépecha population. The new migrants were likely few in number or had assimilated into other local cultures before arriving into central Michoacán, due to which there is no evidence of movements of Uto-Aztecan Chichimecas from the northern boundary of Mesoamerica, and the inhabitants of the Michoacán central plateau remained predominantly Purépecha speakers.

==== Formation of the Purépecha Empire ====
The population sizes of the various language speakers in the Pátzcuaro basin differed significantly by c. 1200 AD, and among them the Nahuatl-speaking Chichimecs, that is the Uacúsecha of Pátzcuaro city, were small in number. Competition between the elites of these Chichimecs for access to basic resources led to several wars which resulted in the concentration of political and economic power among the Uacúsecha, with the warrior-leader Tariácuri uniting the various polities of the Pátzcuaro basin into a single state over the course of c. 1300 to c. 1350 AD.

After Tiariacuri's death, his son and his nephews continued to expand the state he founded outside of the Pátzcuaro basin, and initiated the political and economic changes which saw the foundation of the Purépecha Empire.

During the Middle Postclassic Period, the number of sites in the Purépecha Empire increased and the inhabited area increased twice, with many of the new sites being located on newly exposed islands and on fertile lake soil exposed by a phase of decrease in lake water levels. During the later Postclassic, these sites were flooded, and the settlements moved to the new lakeshore and to highly fertile agricultural areas, causing the number of sites and inhabited area to again double in size, leading to the maximum expansions of Urichu, Pareo and the whole exposed island of Xarácuaro, as well as densely occupied towns with public architecture at Tocuaro, Arocutin, Charahuen, and Ajuno (Axuni).

Thus, the population density of Michoacán peaked during the Late Postclassic, and the largest and most densely populated settlements, including both ceremonial centres and cities, date from this period.

=== Protohistoric period ===
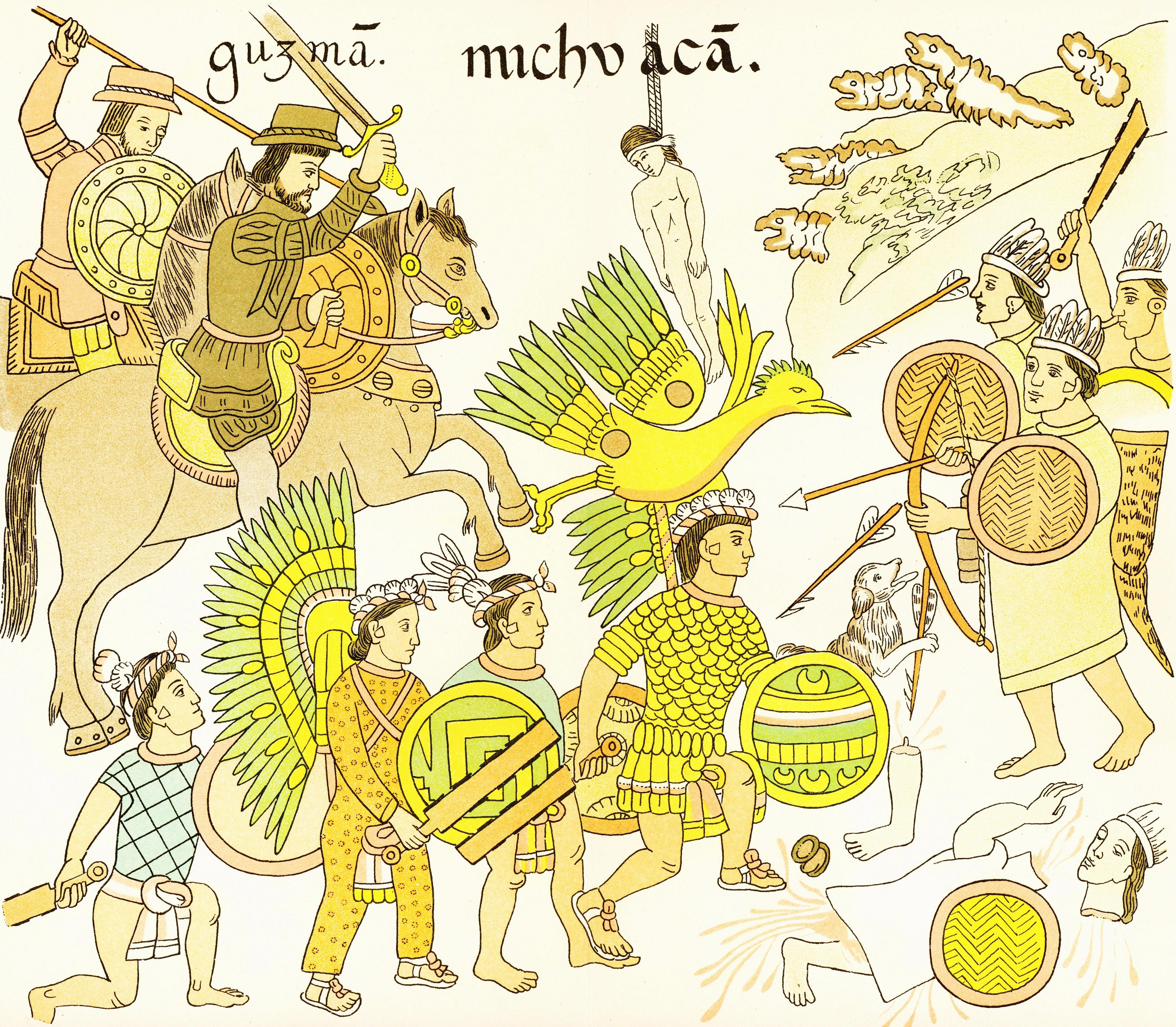
Spanish-Tlaxcalan conquest of Michoacan under conquistador Nuño de Guzmán

Although some sparse and limited archaeological research has been conducted in Michoacan, most of it relates to the Purepecha Empire. Therefore, the only sources for the Late Postclassic and the Protohistoric periods come from 16th century ethnohistoric and historic sources, especially the Relación de Michoacán.

=== Purépecha Empire ===
The main pre-Hispanic civilization of the state is that of the Purépecha, which was centered in the Lake Pátzcuaro area. Before the 13th century, both Nahua and Purépecha peoples were here, sustaining themselves by agriculture and fishing. The Purépecha are descendants of a late arrival of Chichimeca who came from the north. At Lake Pátzcuaro, they came upon people with similar cultures to their own but who were more technological and socially advanced. The formation of the Purépechan state in the 13th century, when these people started their own dominion at Uayameo, today Santa Fé de la Laguna, and becoming dominant over the entire Lake Pátzcuaro area by the 15th century. Conquest of neighboring tribes and territories occurred between 1401 and 1450, as they absorbed peoples with different cultures and languages into the empire. By the late 15th century, this state rivaled that of the Aztecs, having expanded their territory over much of what is now Michoacán and into part of Colima, Nayarit, Querétaro, Guanajuato, Guerrero and Jalisco. The Aztecs attempted to invade the Purépecha but were repelled. Because of this attack, the Purépecha later denied the Aztecs aid in their defense of Tenochtitlan against the Spanish and the Tlaxcala. The Purépechas are noted by historians to be one of the few rare instances in the Americas were the indigenous people had some experience with metallurgy prior to the arrival of the Europeans, especially coppersmithing and other metal ores located in their empire. Their descendants are still widely regarded for this today.

=== Colonial period ===
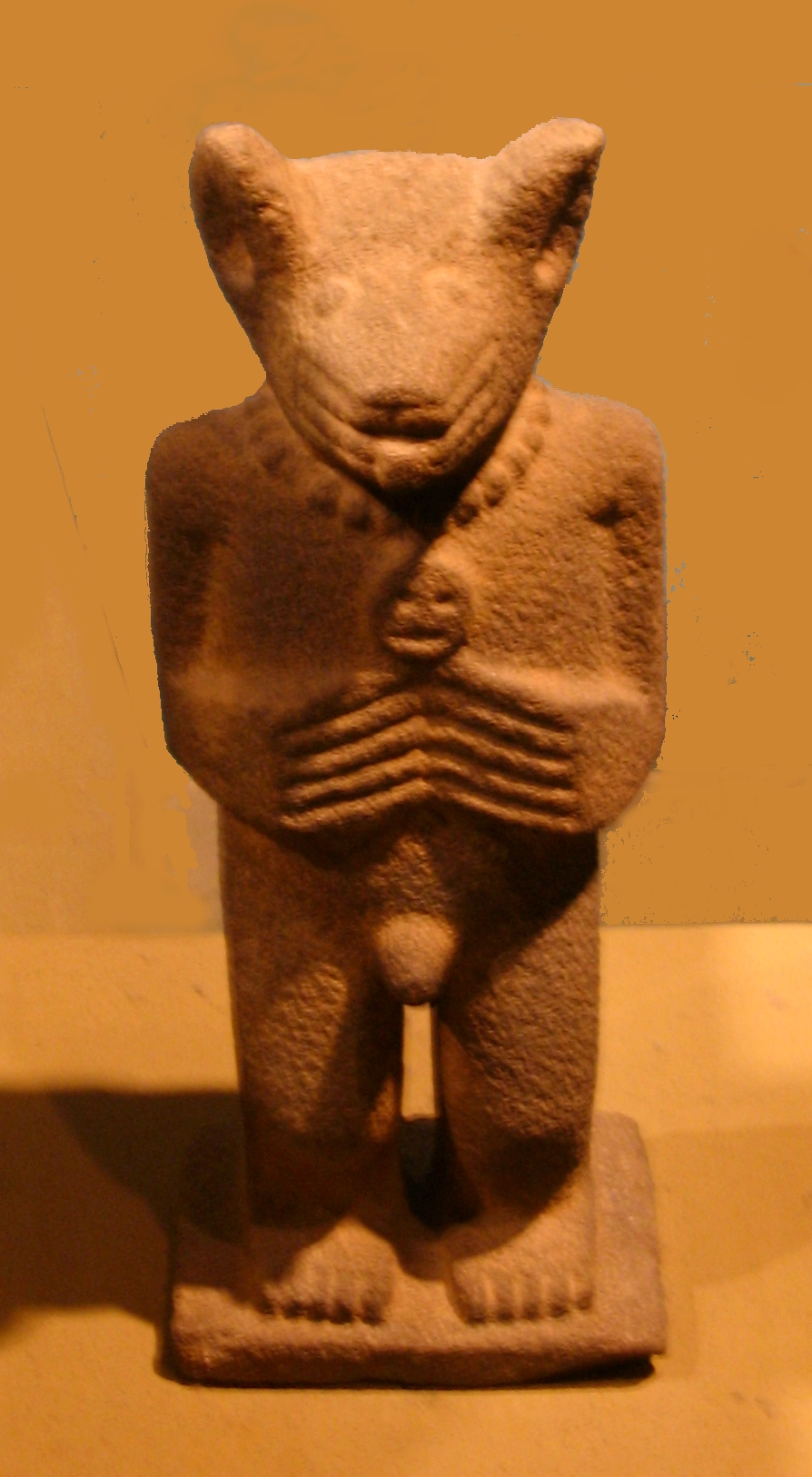
Purépecha coyote statue

Prior to the arrival of any Spaniard in the territory, then-ruler Zuanga died of smallpox, presumably carried by one of the Aztec delegations seeking military aid. He was succeeded by Tanganxoan II. The first Spaniard to the area was Cristóbal de Olid. The Spanish destruction of Tenochtitlan and their promise to allow him to remain ruler convinced Tanganxoan II to submit to Spanish rule. But, Nuño de Guzmán reneged on this agreement and killed Tanganxoan II in 1530, a crime for which he was tried and exiled to Spain where he would die in prison.

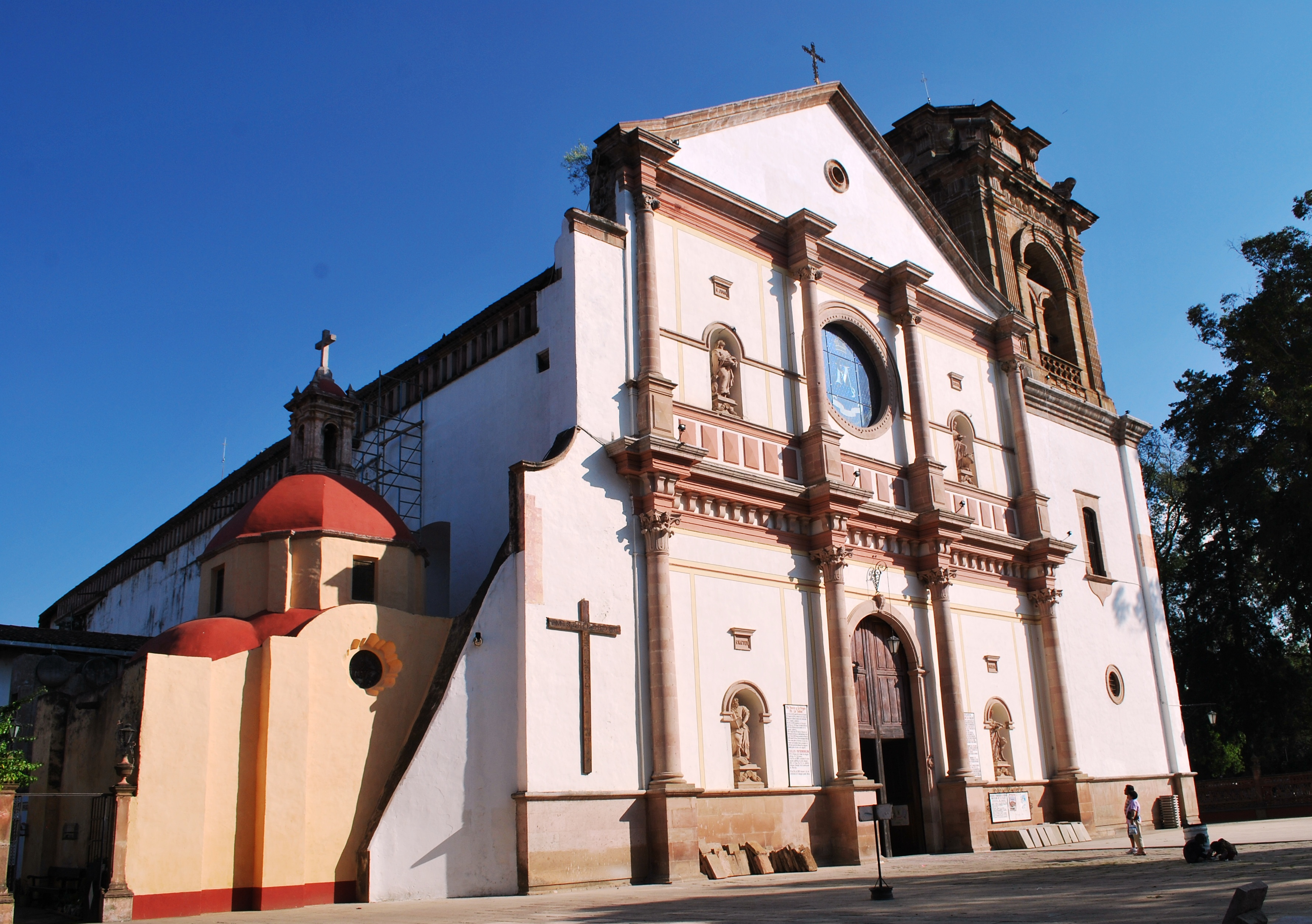
Basilica of Nuestra Señora de la Salud in Patzcuaro

During the first years of the conquest, Michoacán was part of the "Kingdom of Mexico", a subdivision of colonial Mexico which included the current states of Michoacán, Estado de México, Querétaro, Hidalgo, Tlaxcala, Oaxaca, Morelos, Guerrero, Veracruz, Tabasco, Guanajuato and parts of San Luis Potosí, Jalisco and Colima. These lands were divided into encomiendas among the conquistadors. The provinces with the largest populations were called Alcaldías Mayores, with Michoacán being one of these, with its capital initially at Tzintzuntzan. Soon after, it was moved to Pátzcuaro and eventually settled in what is now Morelia. The provincial and later state capital was founded by viceroy Antonio de Mendoza in 1541. It became the political and ecclesiastical center of the province after the death of Vasco de Quiroga in 1565.

Soon after the Spanish Conquest, evangelists from the Franciscan, Augustinian, Carmelite and other orders established monasteries all over the territory. Some of the best-known are Juan de Moya, Martín de la Coruña and Jacob the Dacian. As first governor, Nuño de Guzmán disrupted and devastated the social and economic order of the area. Vasco de Quiroga succeeded Guzman, bringing Franciscan and Augustinian friars to both evangelize and repair the area's broken economy and social institutions. Quiroga founded the Spanish city of Pátzcuaro in 1538, calling it the Ciudad de Mechuacán. For his efforts, Quiroga is still referred to in the Pátzcuaro area as "Tata (grandfather) Vasco". The diocese of Michoacán was established in 1536 by Pope Paul III, and its boundaries coincide with the old Purépecha kingdom. Its first bishop was Vasco de Quiroga.

The Universidad Michoacana de San Nicolás de Hidalgo began as the Colegio de San Nicolas Obispo, founded by Vasco de Quiroga in Pátzcuaro in 1540. It was originally a seminary for the training of evangelists. It was granted a royal seal in 1543 to become the Real Colegio de San Nicolás Obispo. The school was moved to Morelia in 1580 and was fused with the Colegio de San Miguel Guayangareo. In 1590, its name was changed to the Seminario Tridentino, afterwards to Seminario Conciliar in 1601. By the end of the 17th century, the name returned to Colegio de San Nicolás but its structure was profoundly changed, adding studies such as philosophy, civil law, and others. At the end of the 18th and beginning of the 19th centuries, a number of figures associated with the Mexican War of Independence, such as Miguel Hidalgo y Costilla, José María Morelos and others were associated with this school. By the mid-19th century, the school had been secularized and renamed the Primitivo y Nacional Colegio de San Nicolás de Hidalgo adding studies such as chemistry, physics and other sciences. The current name and organization was adopted after the Mexican Revolution in 1917.

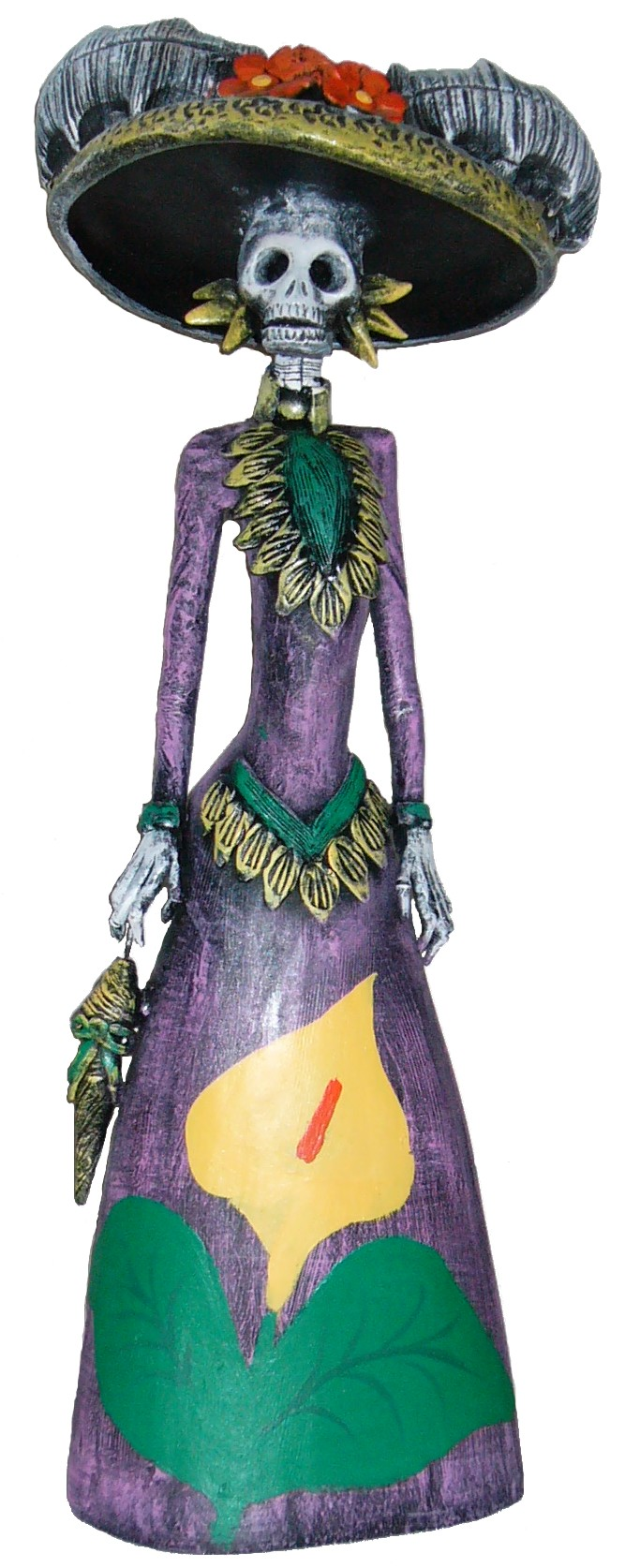
La Calavera Catrina figure bought in Pátzcuaro

From the 16th to the 18th centuries, Augustinian, Franciscan and Carmelite missions were constructed in the territory as well as civil constructions, especially in the city now known as Morelia. Mining in areas such as Angangueo, Tlalpujahua and Inguaran had begun, as well as the establishment of agricultural and livestock haciendas. The first school of higher education, called the Primera Casa de Altos Estudios en América, was founded by Alonso de la Veracruz in Tiripetío. Michoacán was made a separate province from "Mexico" in 1602. By the mid-17th century, the indigenous population had declined by half. In 1776, the territory of Michoacán was reduced to the area in which the modern states of Michoacán and Colima are now. Soon after, Colima split to join with the province of Guadalajara, leaving Michoacán roughly with the territory it has today.

During the entire colonial period, the economy was concentrated in the hands of the Spanish-born, who held vast lands and haciendas. They also held the rights over minerals mined in places such as Tlalpujahua, Angangueo and Huetamo. Indigenous peoples were exploited for their work, and slavery was not uncommon. Education was restricted for only those born in Spain and their descendants and was controlled by the Church. The main educational institutions were the Colegio de San Nicolas, founded in the 16th century; and the Seminary of San Pedro and San Pablo, founded in the 18th century. These schools produced a number of distinguished men, but the best-known is Miguel Hidalgo y Costilla. At the end of the 18th century, ideas from Europe began to infiltrate the upper classes of the state, especially in Valladolid (Morelia) and Zamora. These would eventually lead to the Mexican War of Independence in the early 19th century. This war was foreshadowed by the 1809 conspiracy in Valladolid.

One of the early and main protagonists of the war, Miguel Hidalgo y Costilla, was educated as a priest in the state and began to disseminate Enlightenment ideas here. Soon after Hidalgo performed the Grito de Dolores in Dolores (now Dolores Hidalgo), Guanajuato, a number of people influenced by his thought took up arms against the colonial government. These included Manuel de la Torre Lloreda, Gertrudis Bocanegra, José María Garcia Obeso and Ignacio López Rayón. During his campaign, Hidalgo returned to Valladolid, issuing a decree eliminating slavery.

After Hidalgo's death, much of the insurgency and spies against the Spanish viceroy were located in Michoacán, with documents such as the "Primera Constitución o Decreto Constitucional para la Libertad de la América Mexicana" (First Constitution or Constitutional Decree for the Liberty of the Mexican America) and "Sentimentos de la Nacion", both of which would shape constitutions and governments in the years to come. The first Mexican Supreme Court was also founded here. The Mexican War of Independence was culminated by the army of Agustín de Iturbide, also a Michoacán native, who took Morelia in May 1821.

After the war ended in 1821, the territory of Michoacán became the "Free and Sovereign State of Michoacán on January 31, 1824. This state was initially divided into 4 departments and 22 portions (partidos) under the Ley Territorial of 1825, with the first constitution ratified in the same year. The name of the capital was changed from Valladolid to Morelia at the same time.

In 1831, the state was reorganized into 61 municipals and 207 locales (tenencias). Due to the struggle between centralists and federalists in Mexico in the 19th century, Michoacán's rights as an entity would change depending on who was in control. The state was declared a department in 1836 but became a more independent state again in 1846. Colima broke off from Michoacán to form its own state in this year. In 1849, the municipality of Coyuca was separated to form the state of Guerrero. In 1853, the state became a department again, regaining state status in 1856. In 1857, Contepec was separated from the state of Guanajuato and attached to Michoacán. In 1863, the diocese of Michoacán was reduced in size, but its status was also elevated to archdiocese.

During the French Intervention in Mexico, Morelia was taken by French forces in 1863. Since resistance to the French was particularly strong here, punitive acts were undertaken by the French in places like Zitácuaro, where much of the city was burned. One of the first victories against the French during the Intervention occurred in Zamora.

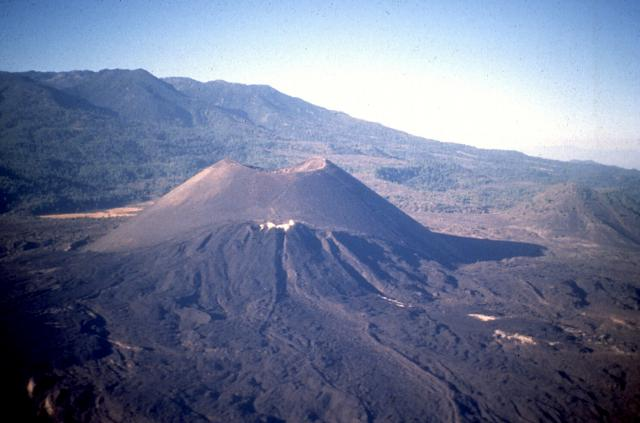
Parícutin in 1997

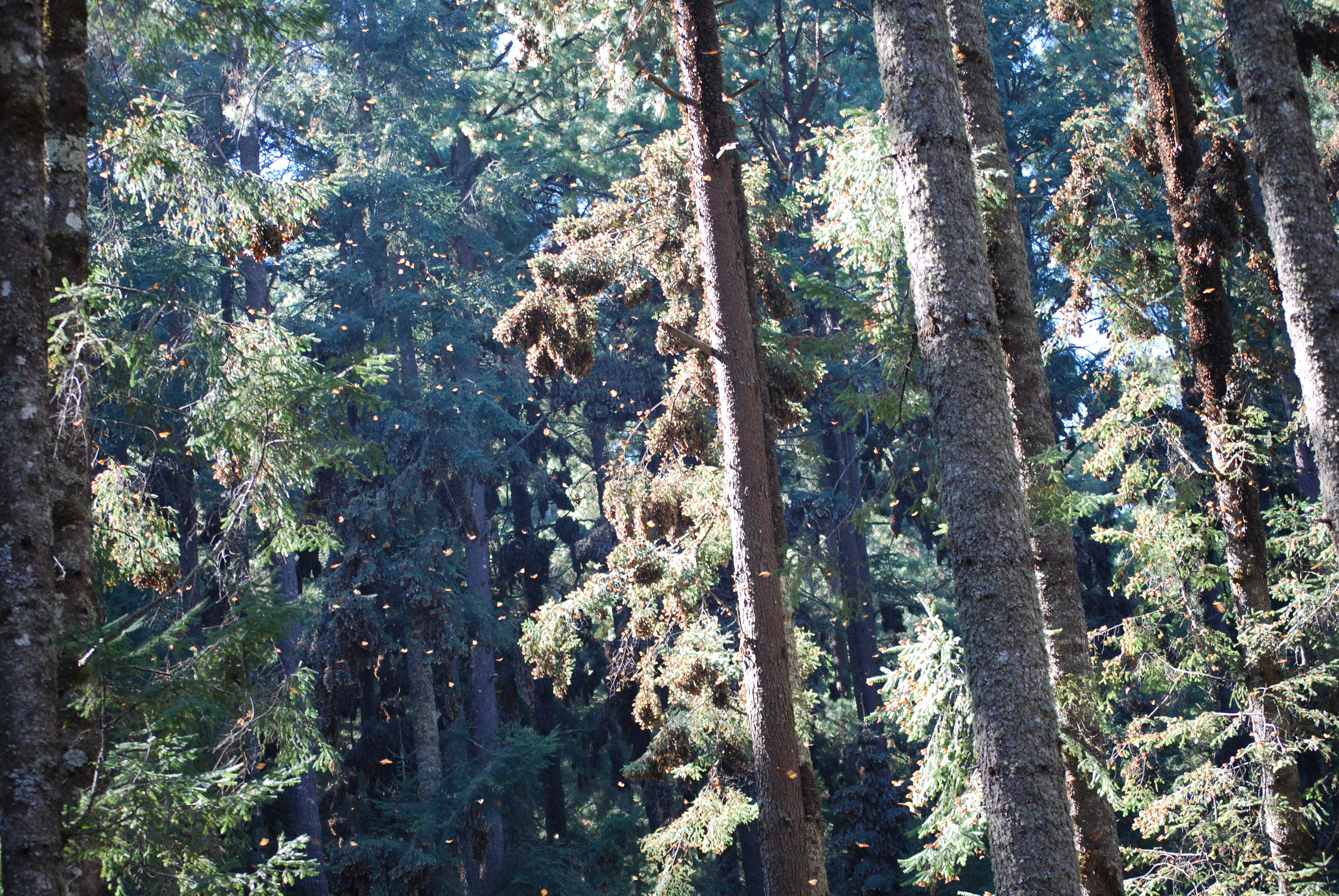
Monarch butterfly sanctuary near the pueblo of Angangueo

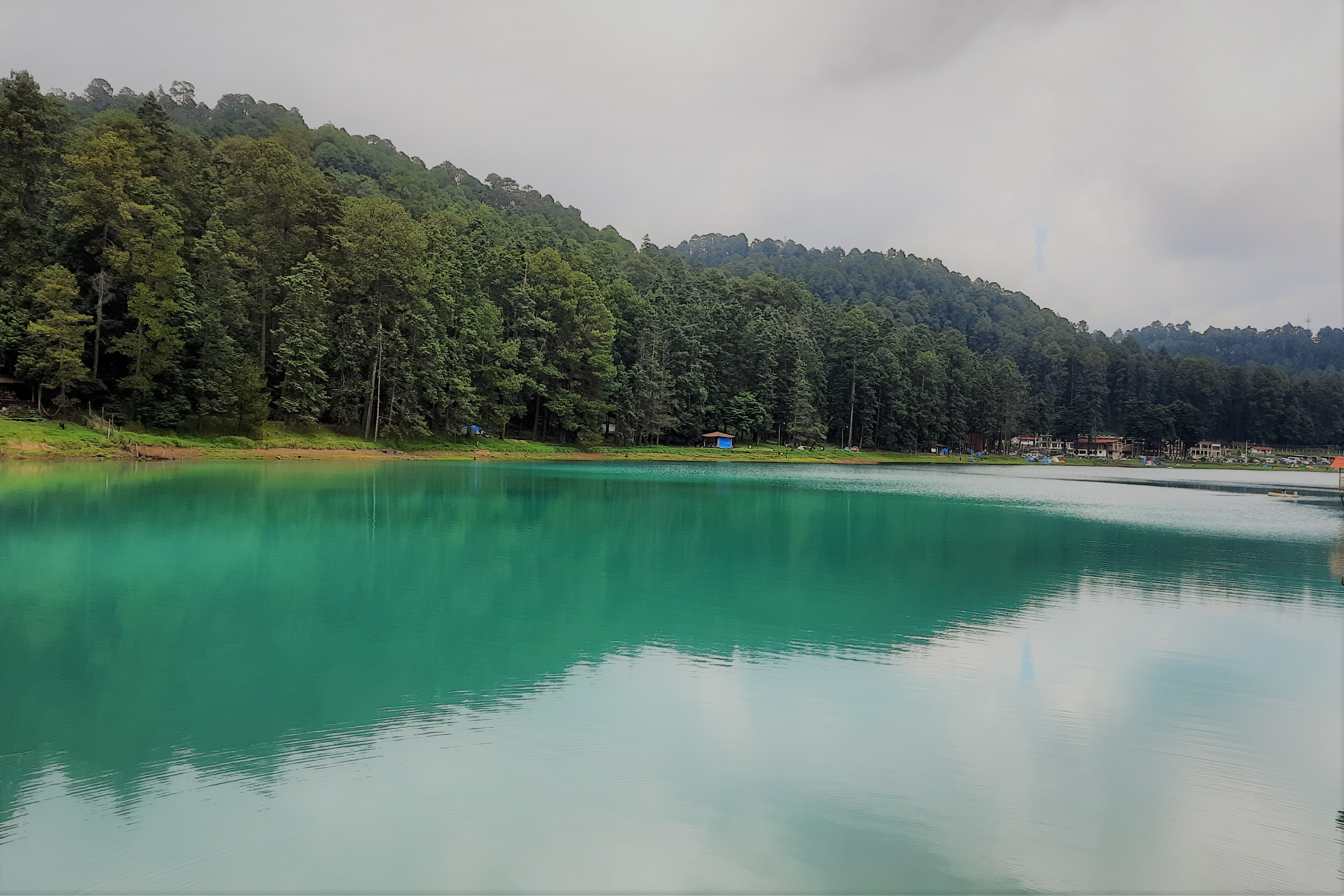
Laguna Larga in Los Azufres

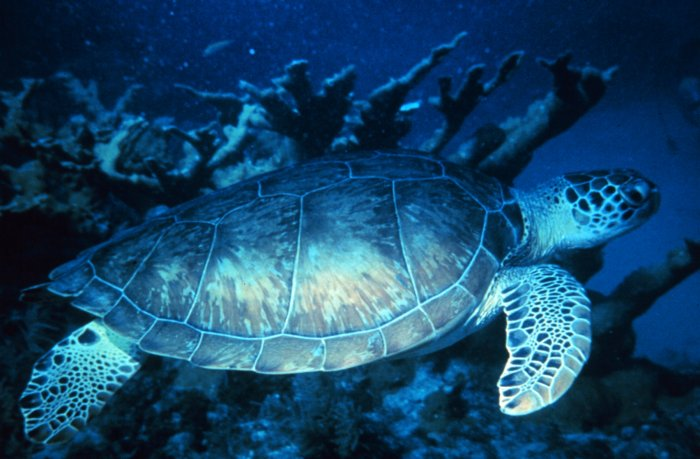
Green sea turtle swimming in the Mexican Pacific

In 1907, Michoacán's boundaries changed again with the addition of the communities of Pungarabato and Zirandaro added from Guerrero state to make the Balsas River a natural border. The Mexican Revolution came to Michoacán in 1911, when those loyal to Francisco I. Madero proclaimed Santa Clara del Cobre as their territory, then went on to take towns around Lake Pátzcuaro under the leadership of Salvador Escalante. The governor of the state, Aristeo Mendoza, resigned. Fighting among various factions would continue in parts of the state for the rest of the war. The state's current constitution was ratified in 1918. In 1920, the Universidad Michoacana de San Nicolás de Hidalgo was founded.

Soon after the end of the Revolution, the Cristero War would affect the state, which affected agricultural production and distribution. In 1926, hostilities closed the seminaries in Morelia and Zamora. Near the end of the war, Lázaro Cárdenas was elected governor of the state and served until 1932; he became president of Mexico in 1934.

Michoacán has been badly affected by the Mexican drug war, due to its methamphetamine and marijuana production. That resulted in the start of an anti-drug trafficking campaign in 2006, an anti-narcotics operation since 2006, grenade attacks in 2008, a shootout in 2015 as well as a massacre and clashes in 2019.

== Geography ==
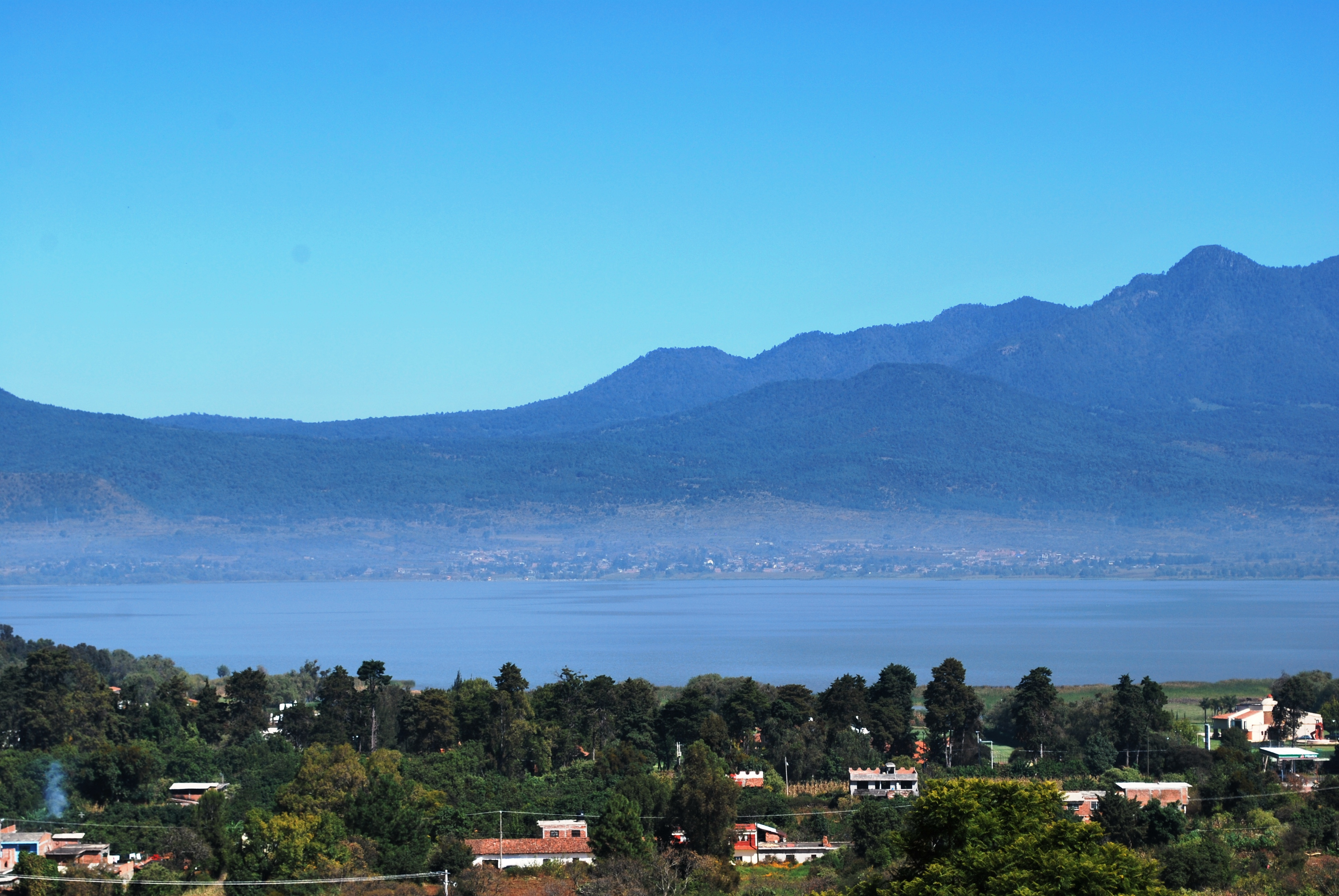
View of Lake Pátzcuaro from Tzintzuntzan

Michoacán is located in west-central Mexico, in the extreme southwest of the central highlands. It borders the states of Jalisco, Guerrero, Estado de México, Guanajuato, Querétaro, and Colima, with a 217 km (135 mi) coastline on the Pacific Ocean. The state has a territory of 58,836.95 km^{2} (22,717.07 sq mi), making it the sixteenth-largest in Mexico (exactly at the midpoint among Mexican states in area). It also has 1,490 km^{2} (580 sq mi) of marine territory off its Pacific coast.

The state is crossed by the Sierra Madre del Sur, the Trans-Mexican Volcanic Belt and the Inter-mountain Valleys region. The Sierra Madre del Sur crosses the state northwest to southeast for approximately 200 km (120 mi) in the southwest between the municipalities of Chinicuila and Arteaga along the Pacific Coast. It is considered to be a continuation of the Sierra Madre Occidental. Peaks in this range average about 2,900 m (9,500 ft) above sea level, with the largest being the Cerro de las Canoas. The Trans-Mexican Volcanic Belt crosses the state from west to east toward the Toluca Valley and Valley of Mexico. This mountain range is marked by appearance of many volcanoes, active, dormant, and extinct alike. This system is subdivided into regions such as the Sierra de Tancítaro, Sierra de Periban, Sierra de San Angel and others. The best-known volcano in this region is the Paricutín volcano.

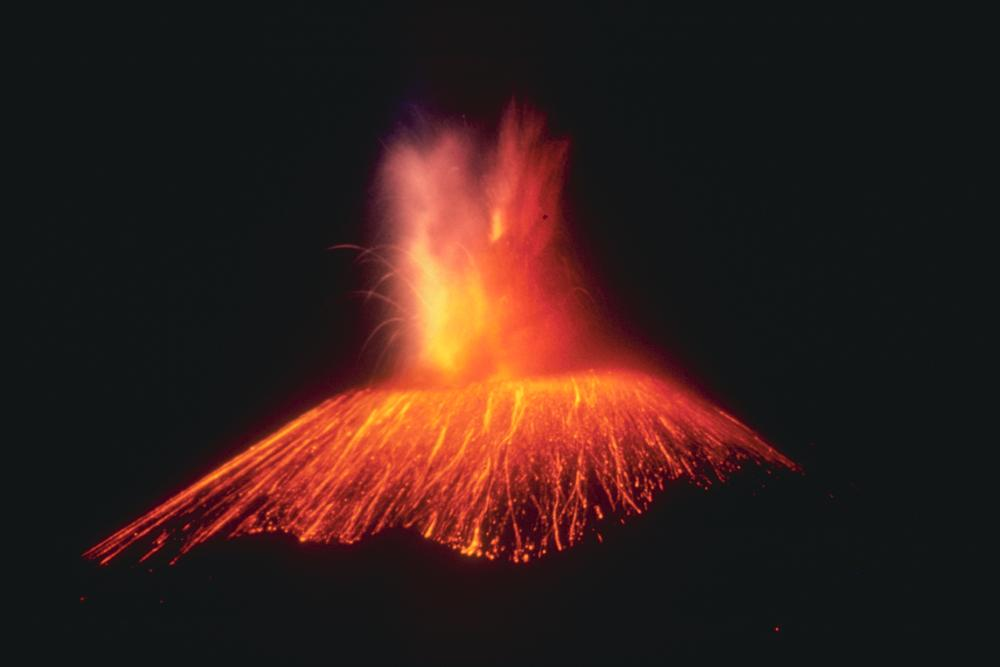
Parícutin 1943 eruption at night

The state has a large number of lakes, waterfalls, lagoons, hot springs, and a natural system of waterways, including parts of two of the country's largest rivers, the Lerma and the Balsas. These waterways are divided into three regions, called the North, Central and South. The North region includes the Lerma Basin. On the Lerma River is the Tepuxtepec Dam which has a capacity of 371 million m^{3}. Rivers that empty into the Lerma in Michoacán include the Tlalpuhahua, Cachivi and Duero. Another river basin here is that of Lake Cuitzeo, which extends over an area of 3,618 m^{2} (38,940 sq ft). The two main rivers that feed this lake are the Grande de Morelia and Queréndaro.

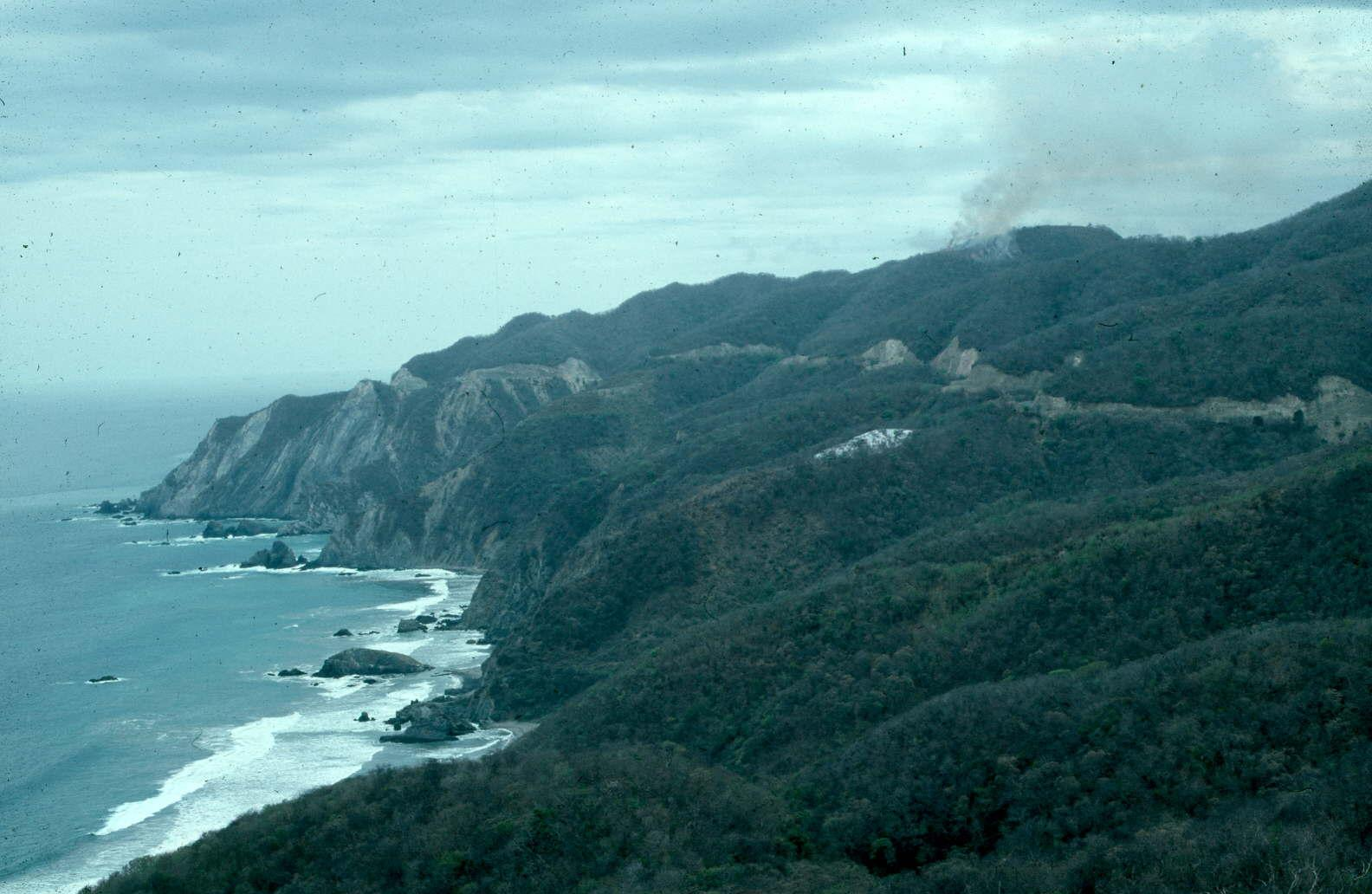
Sierra Madre del Sur along the Michoacán seacoast

The Central region is represented by lakes Pátzcuaro and Zirahuén. Lake Pátzcuaro has a surface area of 1,525 km^{2}. This lake is fed by a number of surface and subterranean water flows with the principal rivers leading here including the San Gregorio and Chapultepec. This lake has five islands within it called Janitzio, Yunuén, La Pacanda, Tecuén, Jarácuaro, Urandén and Carián. Lake Zirahuén has an area of 615 km^{2} (237 sq mi) and is fed by streams such as Manzanilla and Zinamba. These two lakes are considered to be the main tourist attraction of the state.

Most of the state's rivers and streams are located in the south region of the state, with the Balsas River being the most important. The most important tributaries of this river include the Cutzamala, Carácuaro and Tepalcatepec rivers. Within this region is the coastal watershed, which is the area between the Sierra Madre del Sur and the coastline. This area includes small rivers such as the Coahuayana, Aquila, Ostula, Motín del Oro, Coire, Cachán and Nexpa which flow directly into the Pacific.

Much of the climate of the state is determined by altitude and other geographical features. Average temperatures vary from 13 °C (55 °F) to 29 °C (84 °F). Lower temperatures correspond with the highland areas in the north and east while the lower south and west, called La Costa (the coast) or Tierra Caliente (hot land) register higher temperatures. In the hotter lowlands, high temperatures regularly exceed 30 °C (86 °F) and have been known to reach over 40 °C (104 °F) in the summer. The lowest temperatures are registered in highland areas such as the Sierra de Coalcomán and the Sierra del Centro located near the border with the State of Mexico. Except for the Tierra Caliente, most of the state can experience freezing temperatures in the winter. Rainfall is also dependent on altitude with the lowlands receiving less rain than the mountain areas. There is a well-defined rainy season which extends from June to October over the entire state.

=== Flora ===
Ecosystems vary by altitude. Between 2,600 and 3,500 m (8,500 and 11,500 ft) above sea level, most of the vegetation are conifer forests. Between 1,000 and 2,600 m (3,300 and 8,500 ft), there are mixed forests and below this are broadleaf or tropical forests. Tree species include oak, cedar, fir and pine. Mango trees can be found in the eastern and western regions.

=== Fauna ===
Animal types vary from region to region but among mammals these can be found: raccoons, cacomistle, coyotes, lynxes, rabbits, bats, the white-tailed deer, armadillos, mountain lions, ocelots, the gray fox, and jaguars. The latter is an important symbol in Purépecha culture. Numerous bird species can be found including water fowl such as the Great blue heron, Wilson's Snipe, the ruddy duck, and storks. Eagles, parrots, the greater roadrunner, hawks, and falcons are found in the tropical and mountainous regions, including the crested caracara. The great horned owl, American barn owl, and hummingbirds are considered important cultural symbols to the Purépecha. It is also one of three Mexican states where the tarantula species Brachypelma hamorii is found, the other two being Jalisco and Colima. Tiger sharks, thresher sharks, humpback whales and spinner dolphins are found in the coastal waters of Michoacan. Reptiles including crocodiles, various sea turtle species including the leatherback sea turtle and green sea turtle, iguanas, snakes such as the Boa sigma, and caimans can be found in the waterways and along the coastal regions. Michoacán includes critical over-wintering habitat for most of the monarch butterflies from eastern North America. To the Purépechas, monarch butterflies symbolize the spirits of the dead as they journey from the afterlife. The Lake Pátzcuaro salamander, Anderson's salamander, and the jaguar axolotl (all close cousins of the famous Mexico City axolotl) are found in Michoacan, the latter being endemic to Zacapu Lagoon.

Flora and fauna of Michoacán

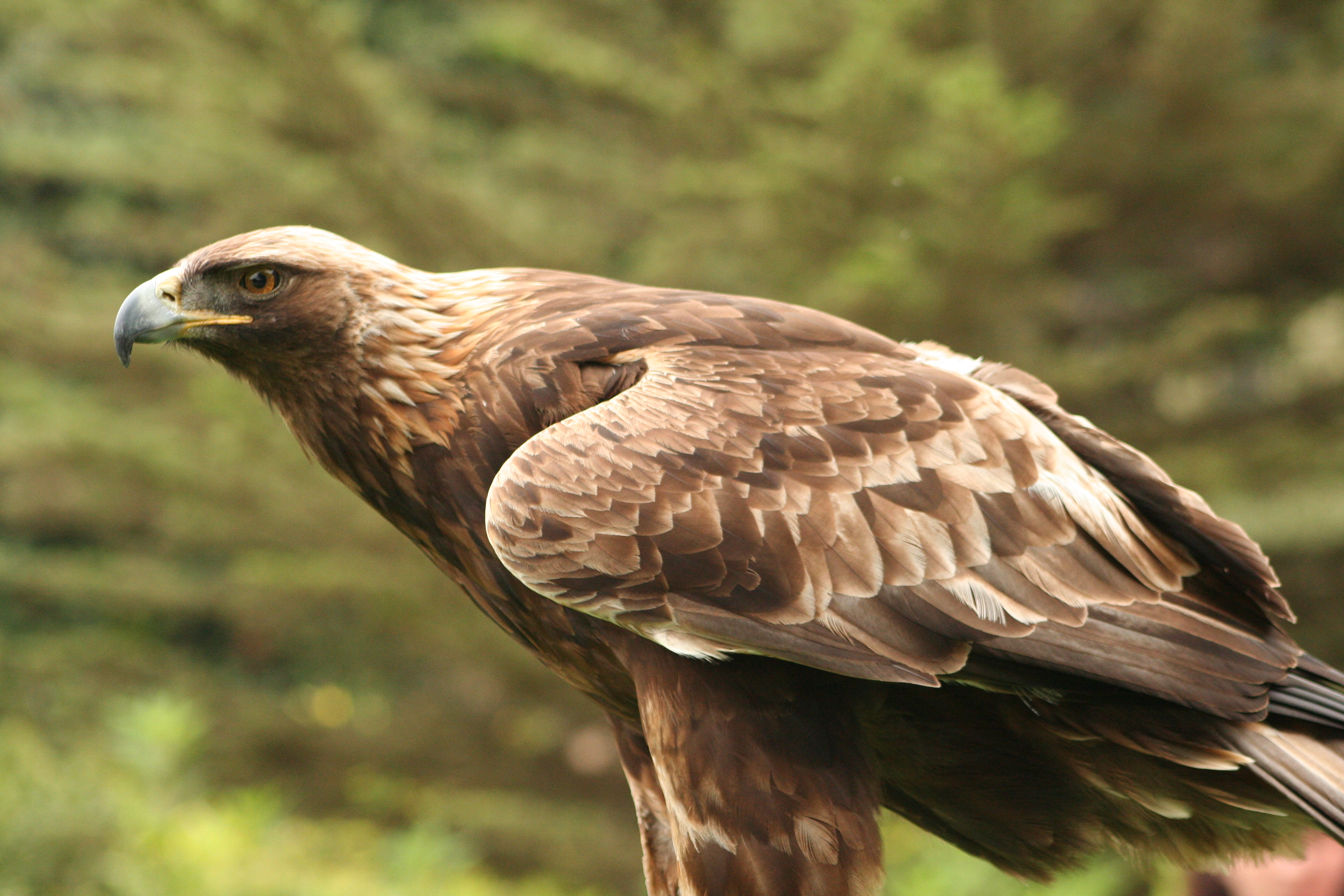
Aquila chrysaetos

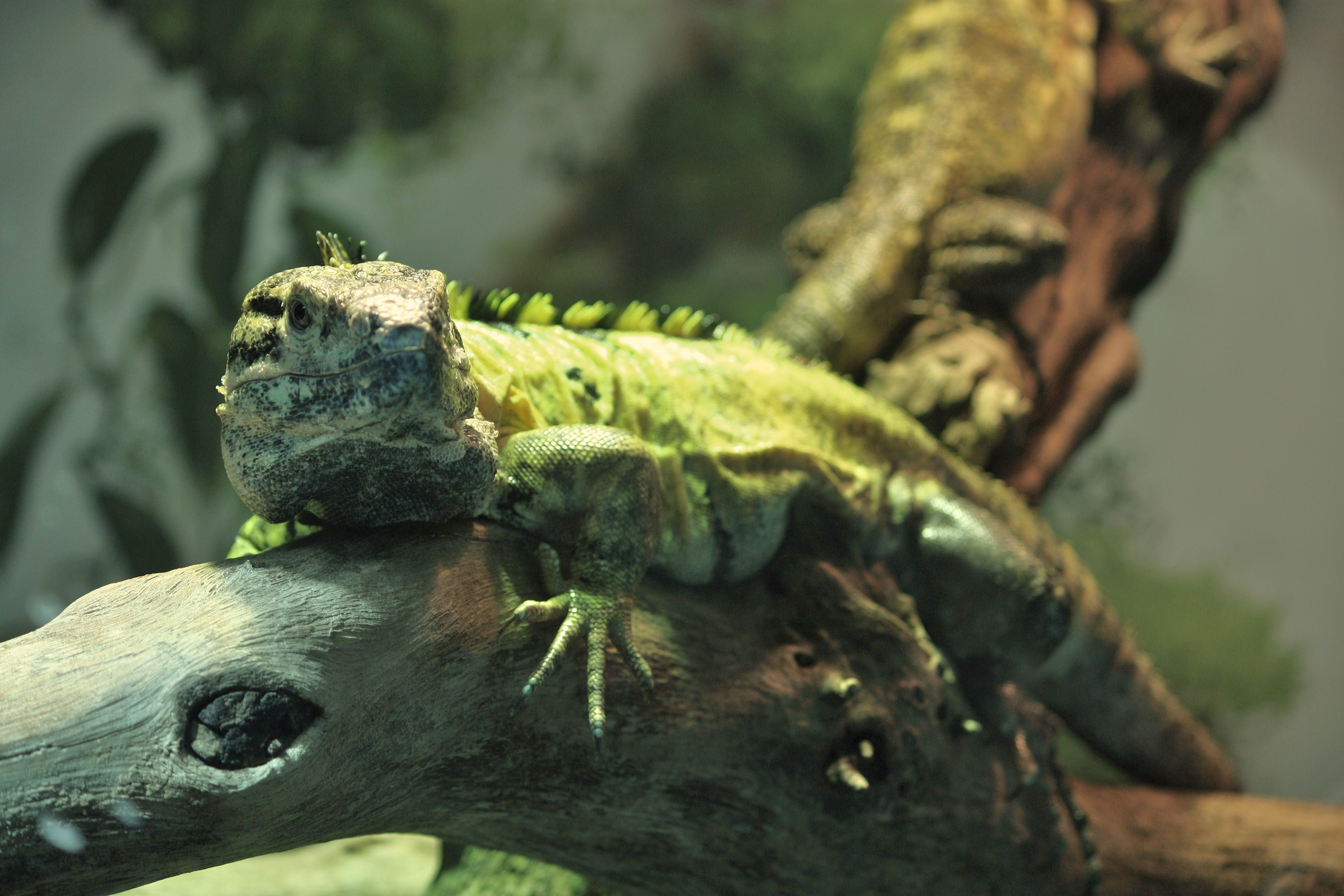
Ctenosaura pectinata

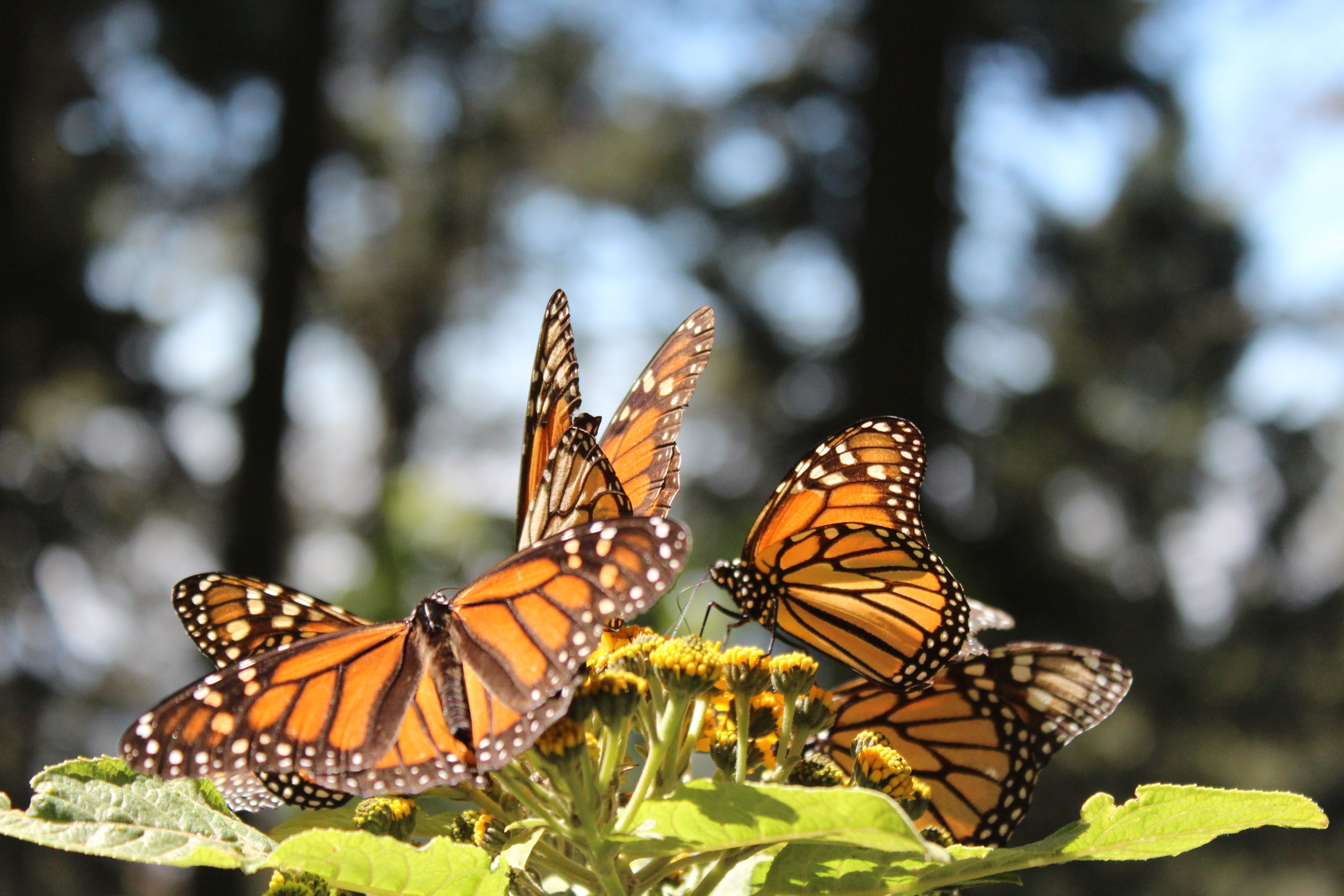
Monarch butterfly

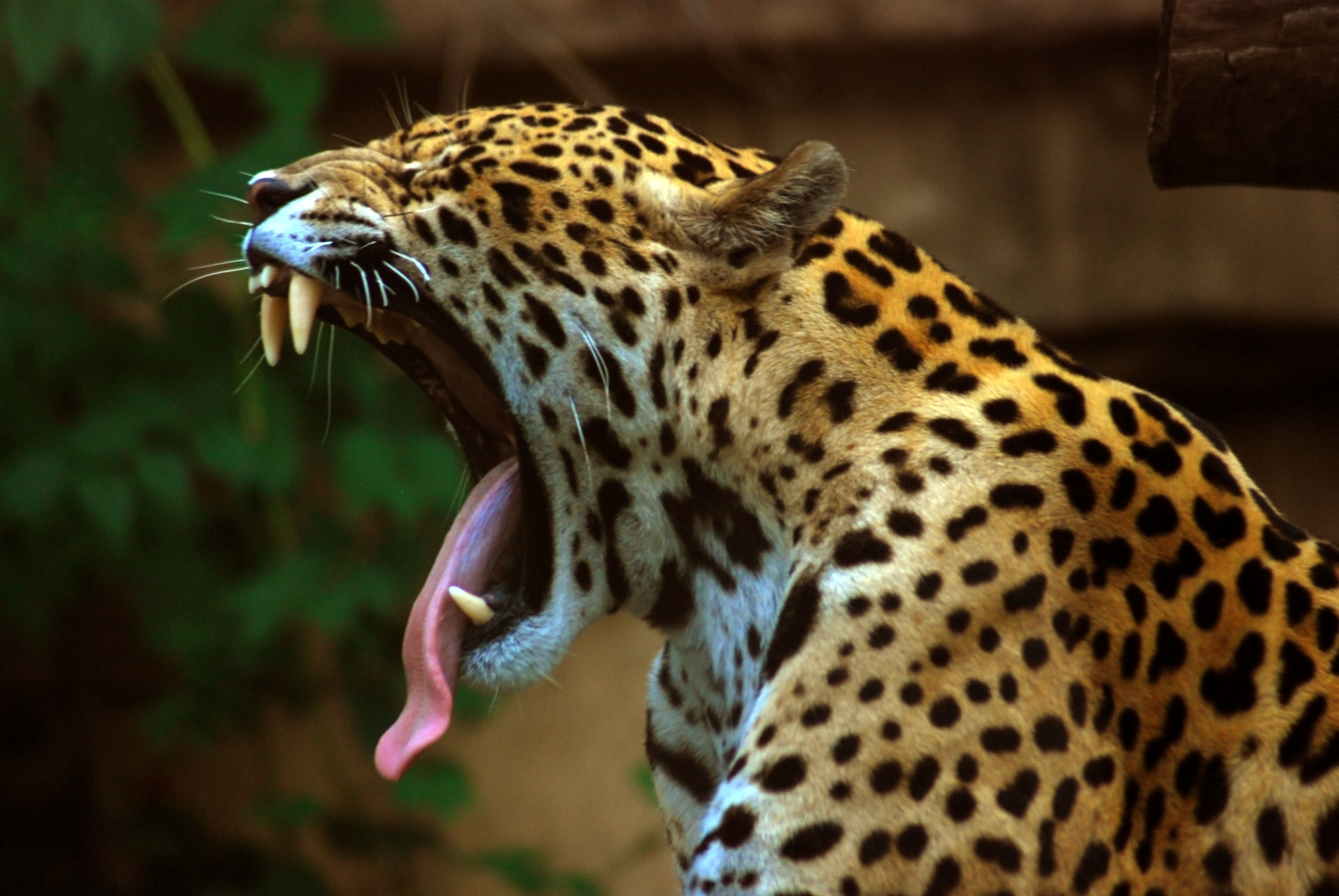
Jaguar

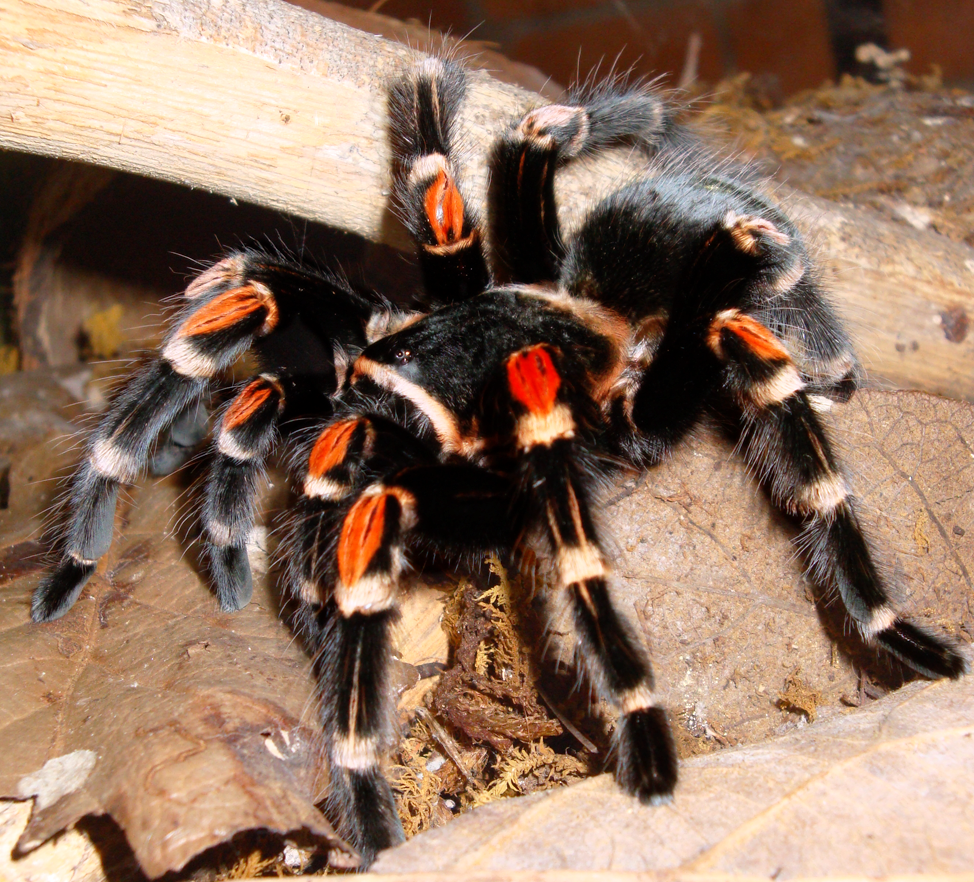
Brachypelma auratum

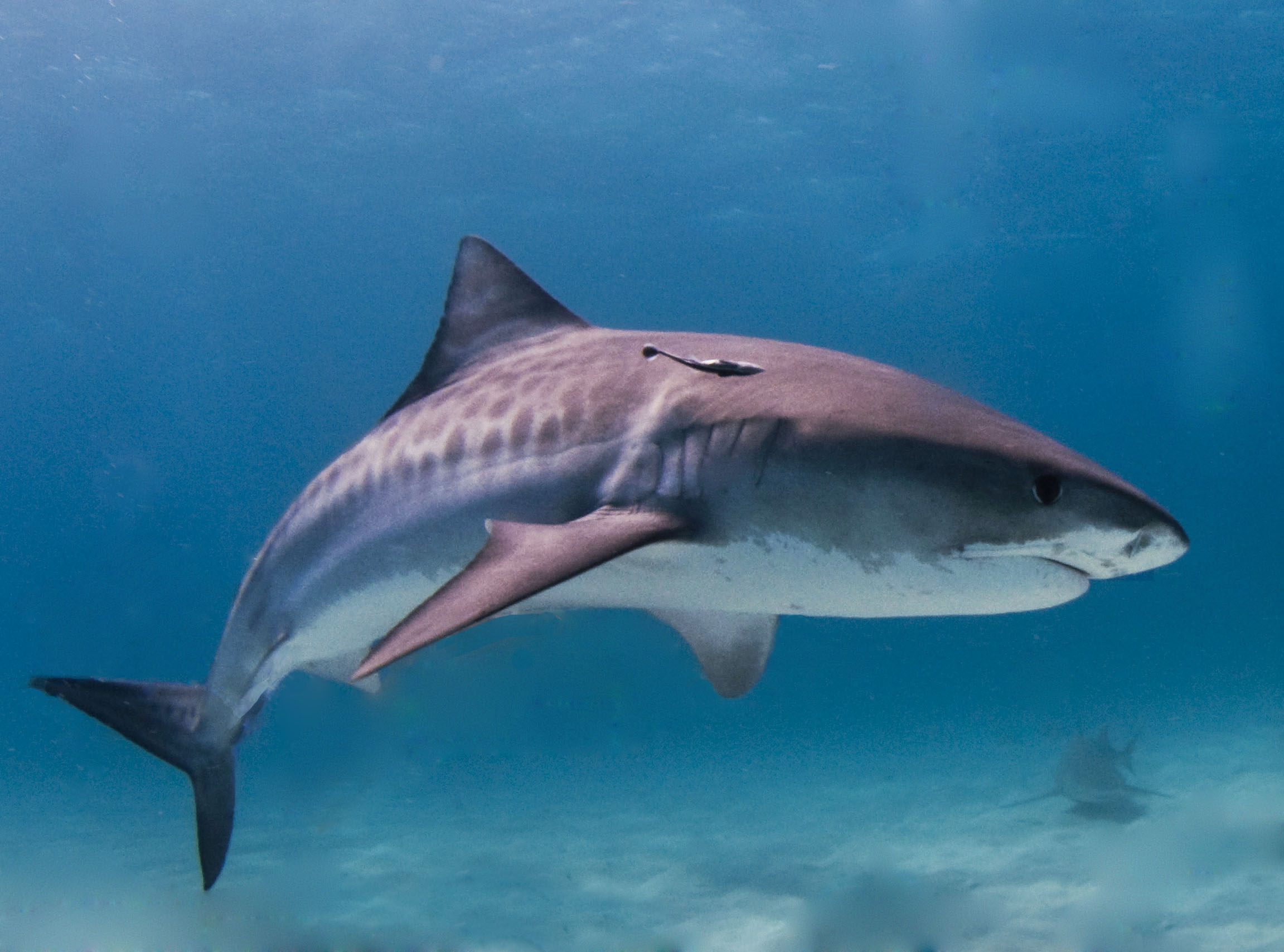
Galeocerdo cuvier

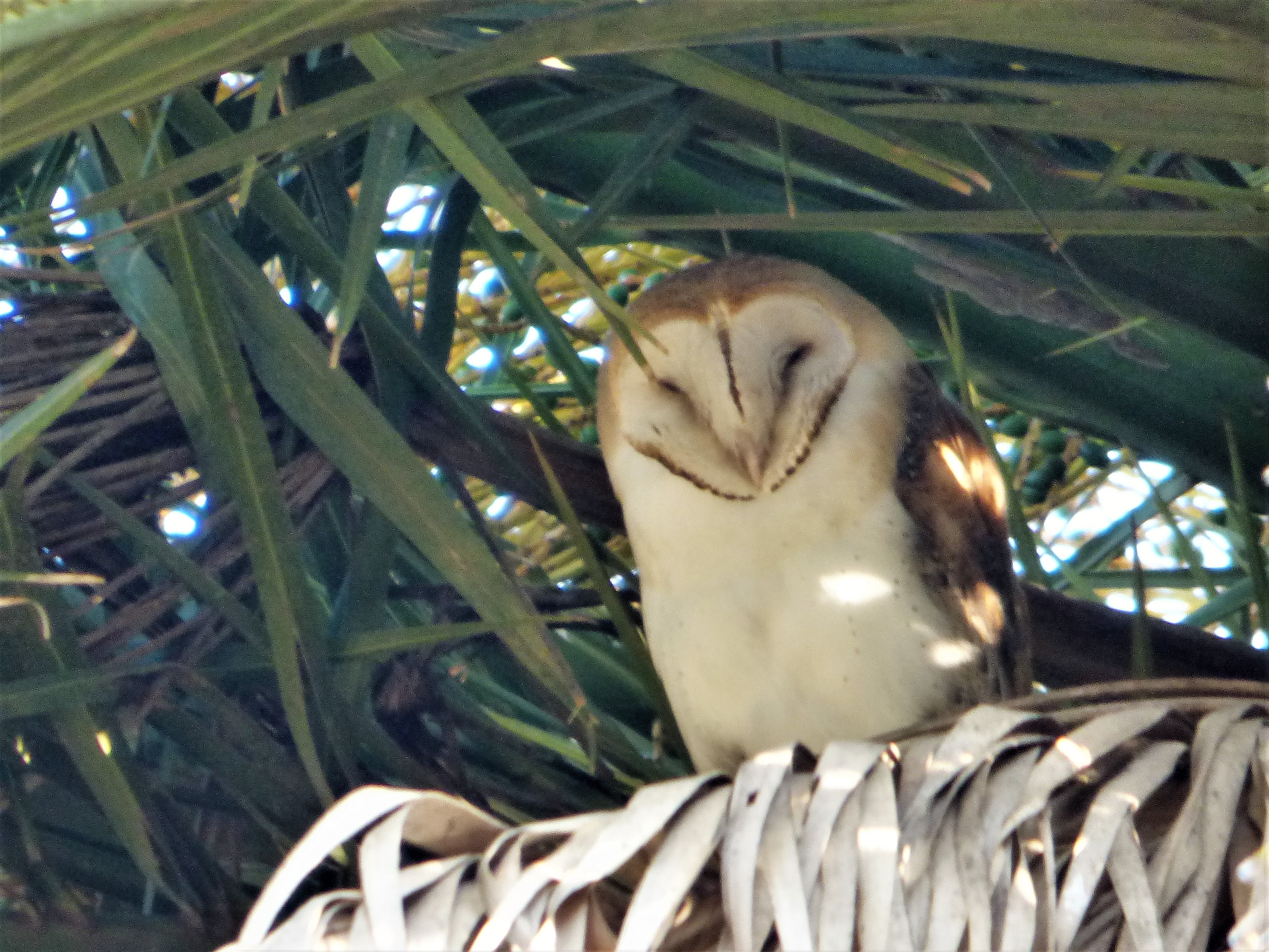
Ghost owl

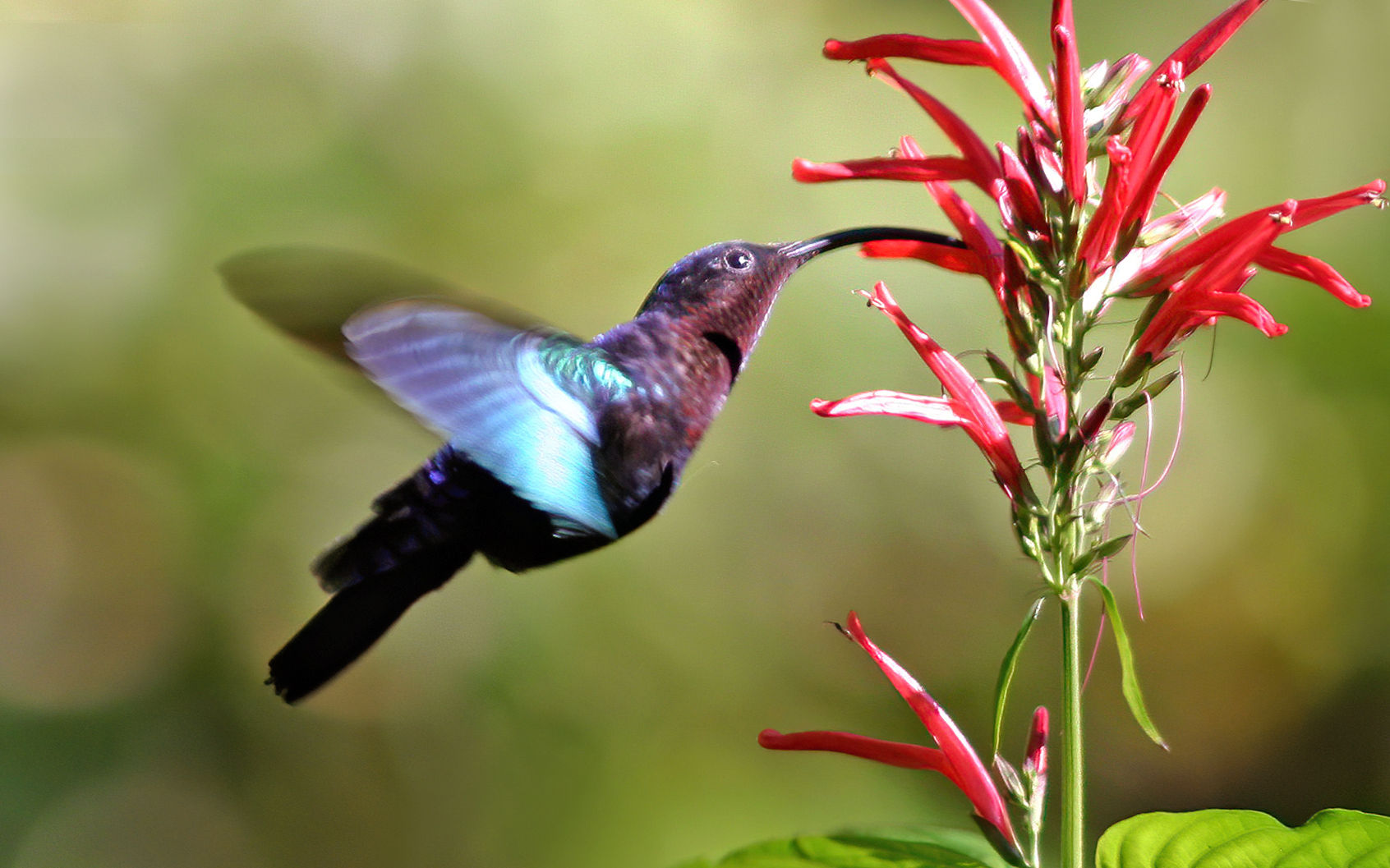
Hummingbird

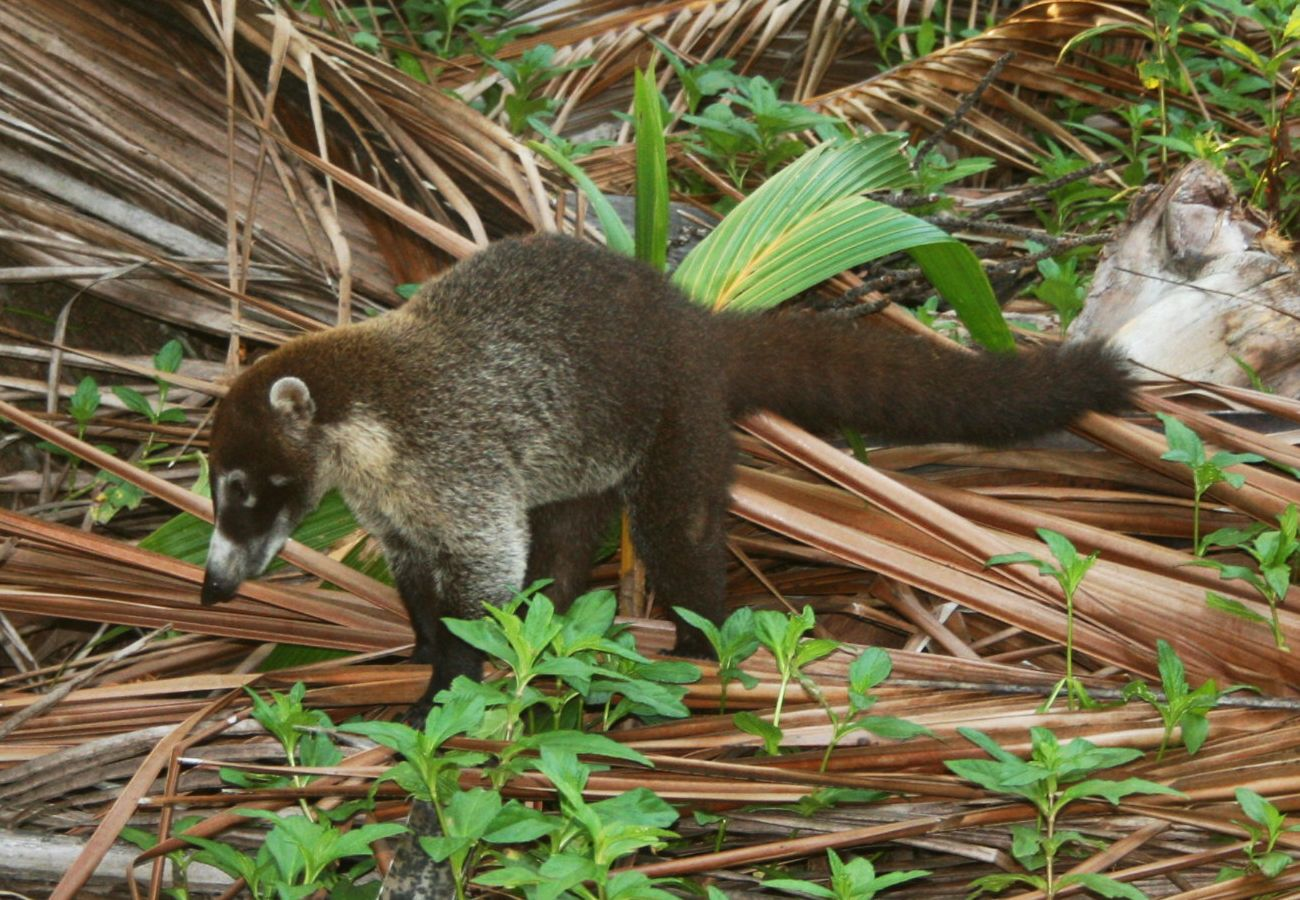
White-nosed coati

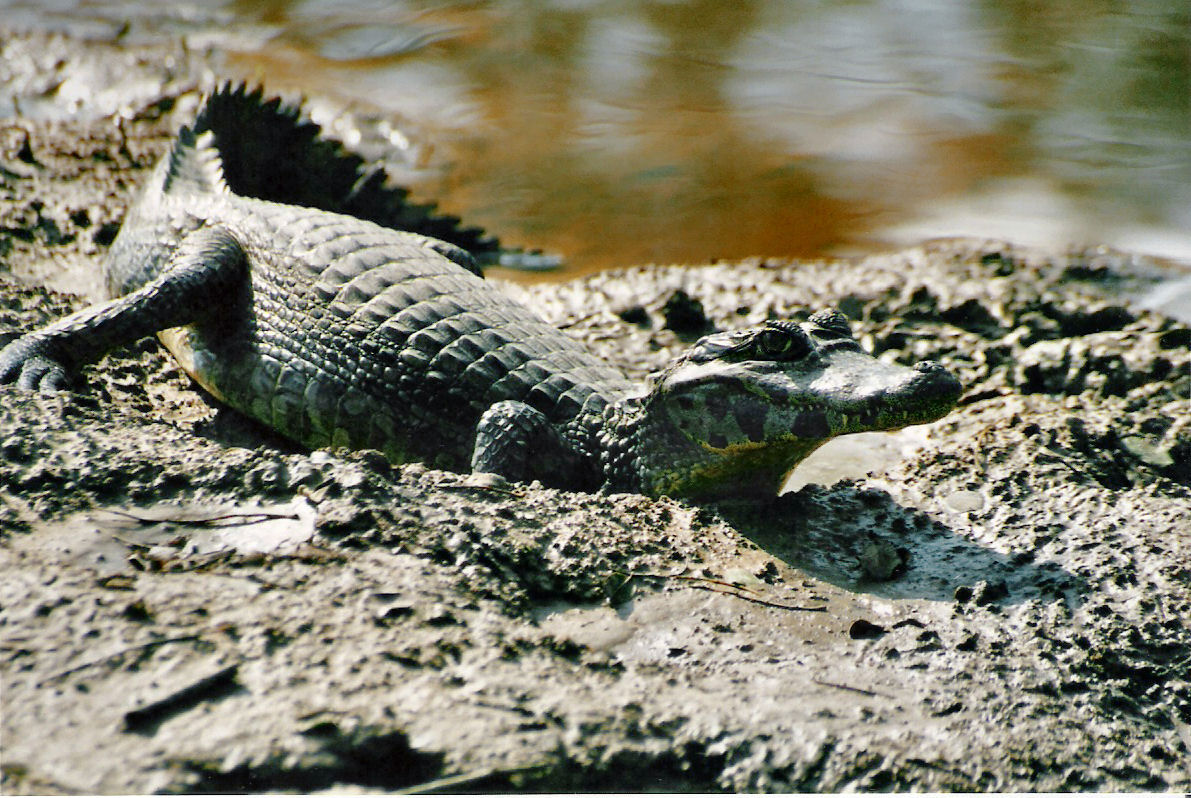
Caiman

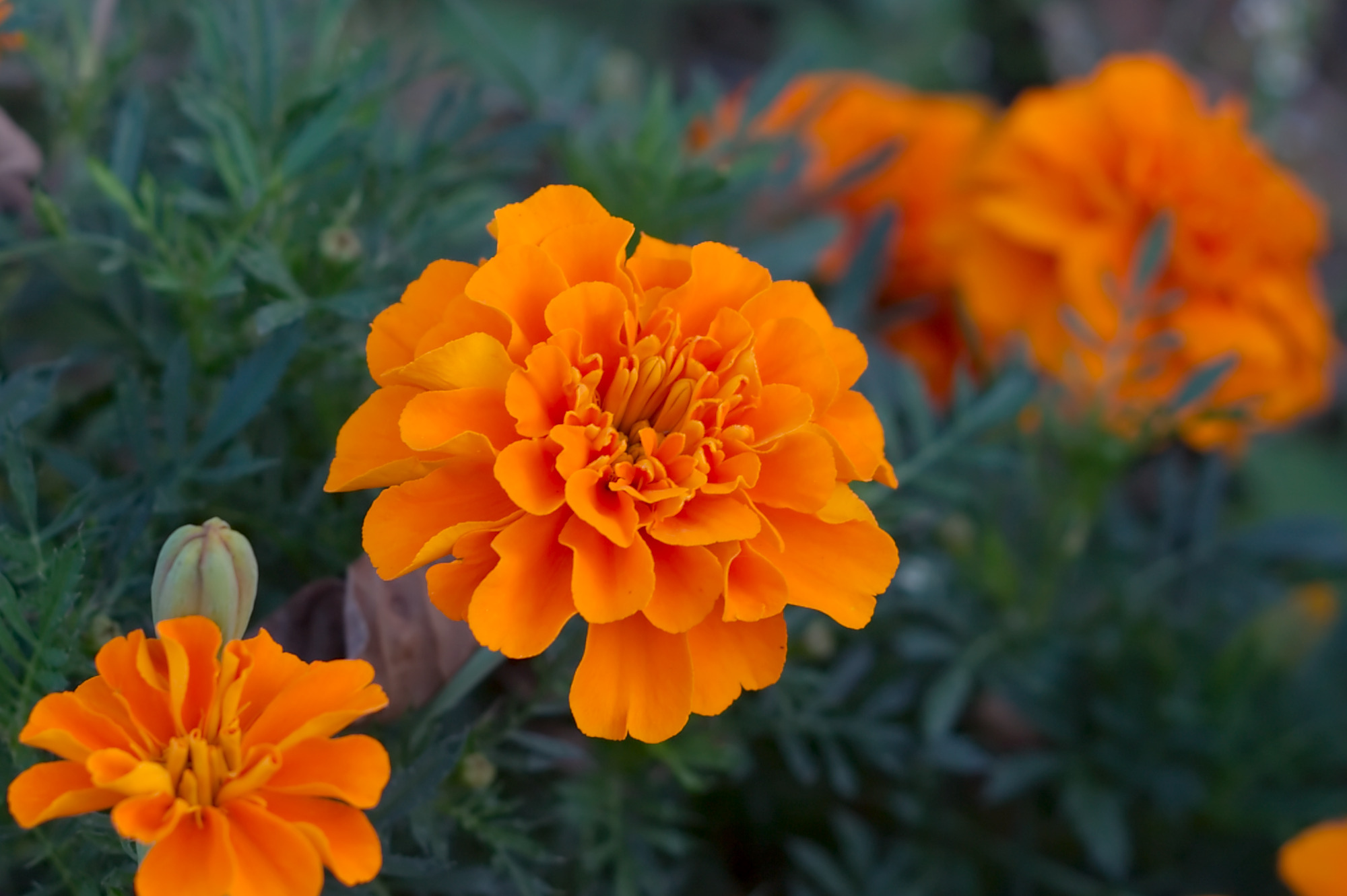
Tagetes

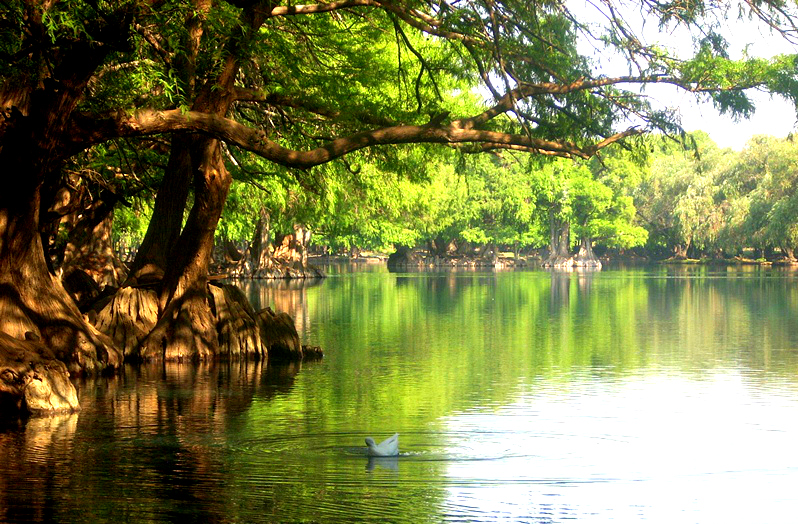
Taxodium mucronatum

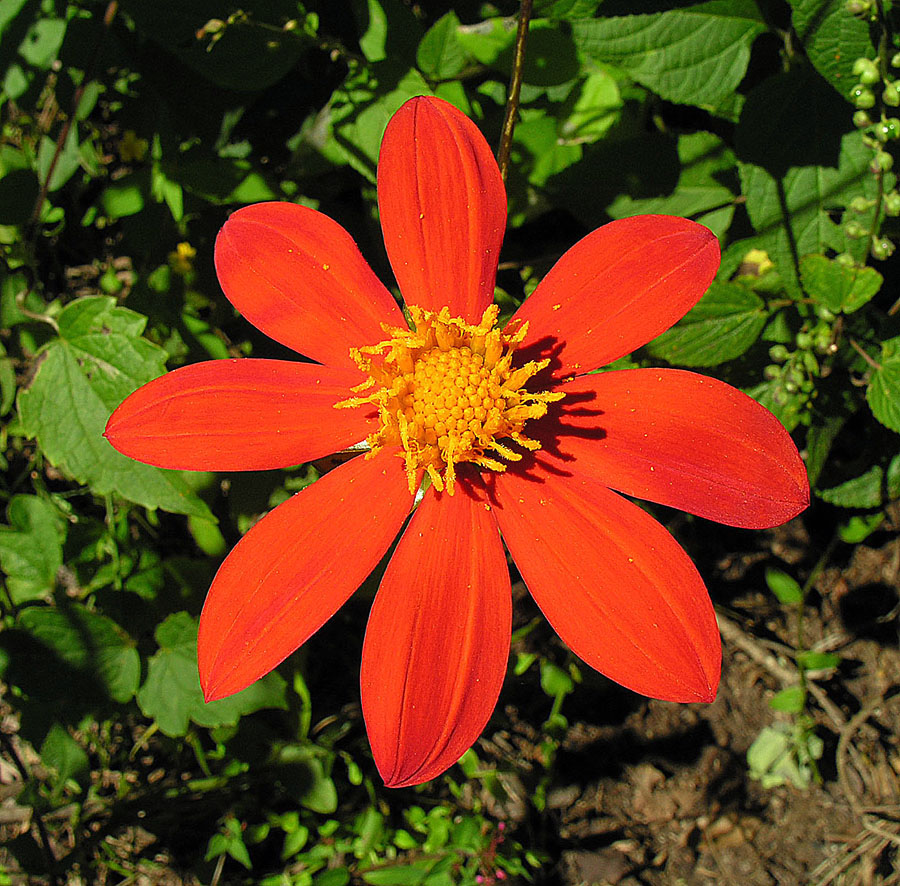
Dahlia coccinea

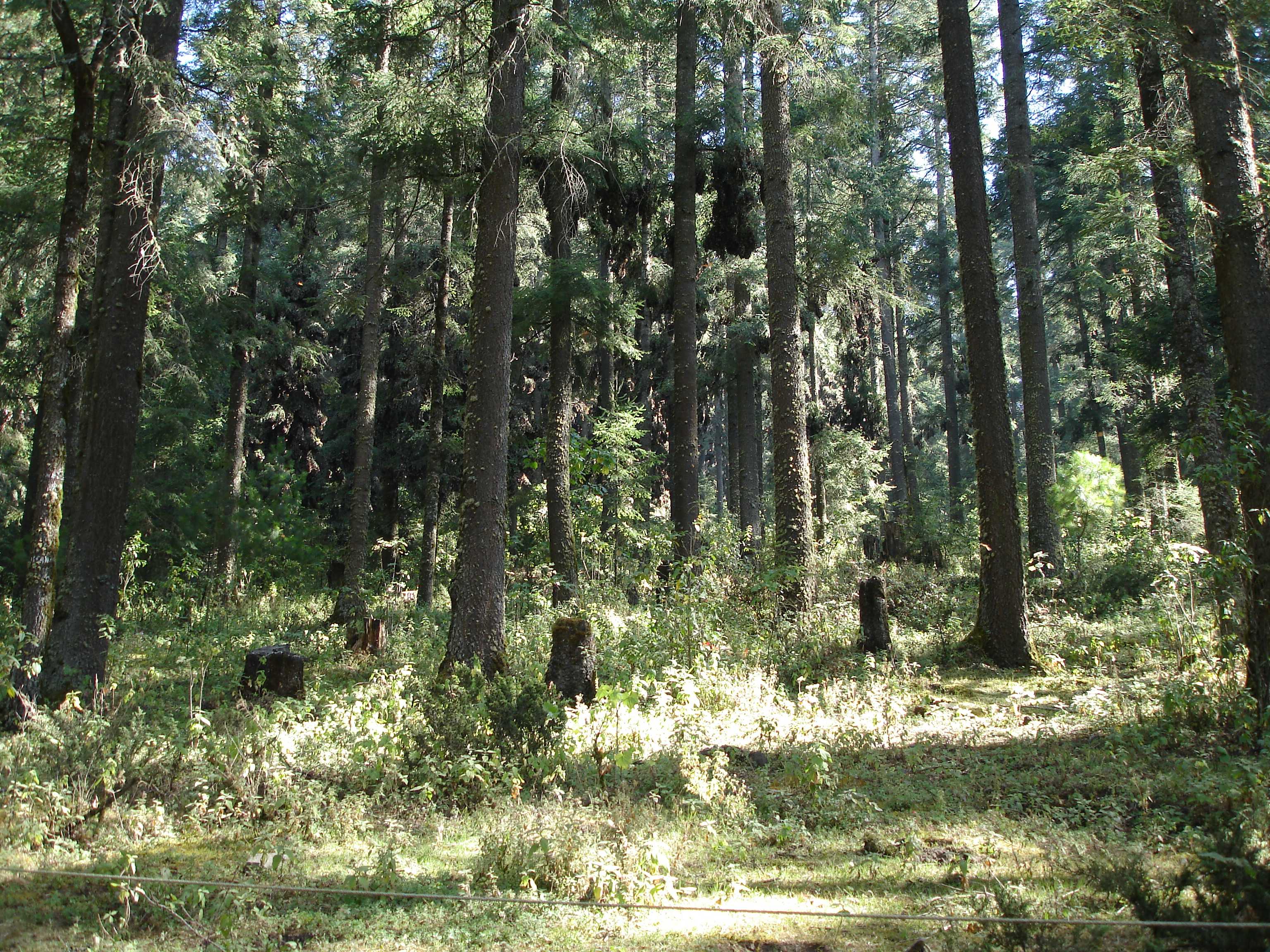
Abies religiosa

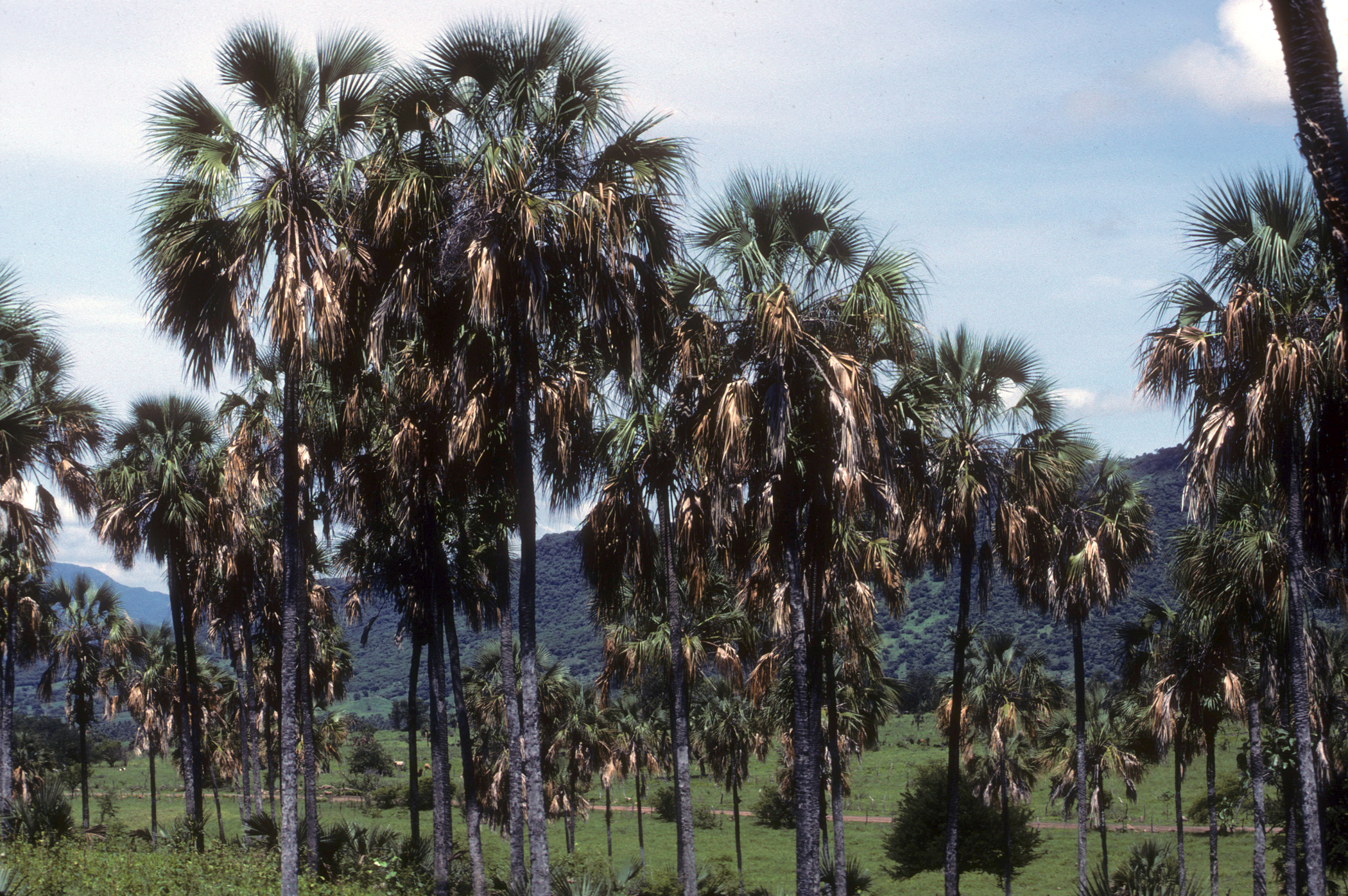
Sabal pumos

=== Protected areas ===
Protected areas in Michoacán include Barranca del Cupatitzio, Bosencheve, Cerro de Garnica, Insurgente José María Morelos, Lago de Camécuaro, and Rayón national parks, Monarch Butterfly and Zicuirán-Infiernillo biosphere reserves, and Pico de Tancítaro Flora and Fauna Protection Area. Lake Pátzcuaro and Zacapu Lagoon are Ramsar Sites, designated wetlands of international importance.

== Economy ==
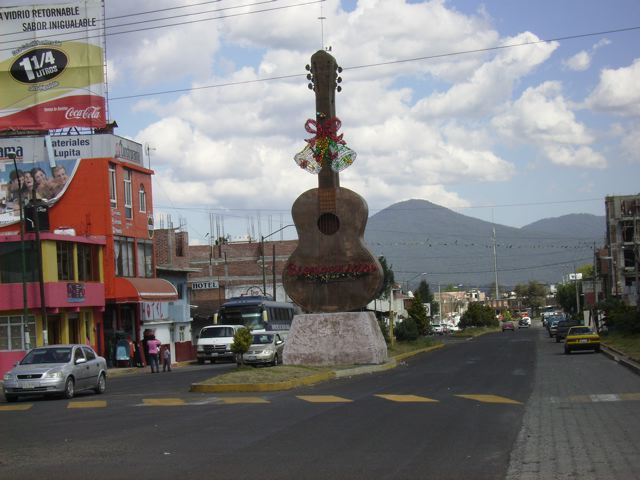
The famed guitar town of Paracho

The economy of the state is based on agriculture, ranching, forest products, fishing and crafts. Most of the population is employed in three sectors: agriculture (34%), mining and manufacturing (23%), and commerce (37%).

=== Agriculture ===
Municipalities of Michoacán that grow avocados (2004)

Agriculture occupies over a million hectares of land in the state or 20% of the land area. Three-fifths of this agriculture occurs only during the rainy season. Irrigation farming is restricted to areas such as the Apatzingán Valley, the Bajío area of Michoacán, the Zamora Valley and some others. Principal crops include corn, sorghum, avocados, strawberries, peaches, wheat, limes, sugar cane and mangos. While corn accounts for 43% of the crops harvested, Michoacán is the largest producer of avocados in Mexico and in the world. 43% of farmland in the territory is dedicated to the raising of livestock, including cattle, domestic fowl, sheep, goats and pigs. In 2007, the state's production of meat, dairy and eggs was valued at over four billion pesos.

Notable contributors to early Michoacán's society and agriculture were Northern Italian Immigrants that arrived in the mid to late 1800s and were drawn to Michoacán's climate and striking resemblance to Northern Italian regions, like Lombardy, Italy. Italians were encouraged to migrate to Michoacán during Porfirio Diaz's presidency and were promised agricultural lands. A notable, industrious Northern Italian immigrant that settled in Michoacán was Dante Cusi. He was born on November 17, 1848 in Corvione di Gambara, Brescia, region of Lombardy, Italy. Dante Cusi founded the towns of Lombardia, Michoacán and Nueva Italia, Michoacán. Cusi brought modern technology, such as modern rice mills, irrigation systems, and built schools. hospitals, and churches. One of his greatest technological projects was his hydraulic network, which carried river water into barren lands.

Cusi specialized in rice harvesting. "In 1911, 2,500 tons of clean rice were produced, which rose to 6,000 in 1915. Each year 2-3,000 additional hectares were made cultivable, with two harvests per year, one seasonal and the other the result of irrigation. Productivity was increased with the introduction of more modern tillage techniques and the sowing of new varieties. Around 1920 each hectare produced 2,450 kg of raw rice: marketed after cleaning, which reduced its weight by 30%, it gave a net utility of 200 pesos." (Destinazioni, Polo, Friz Luigi). Cusi was known for giving life to previously uncultivated areas and building impressive networks of canals. He introduced technologies to Michoacán, such as irrigation systems, modern rice mills, modern tillage techniques and sowing of new varieties. By the 1920s, each Cusi hectare produced 2,450 kg of raw rice: marketed after cleaning, which reduced its weight by 30%, and thus gave a net utility of 200 pesos. Overall, Cusi's work and legacy exemplifies the agricultural & societal influence Northern Italians had in the Mexican state of Michoacán.

=== Forestry ===
Sixty percent of the state is covered in forest, with the most economically important of these located in the higher elevations at the eastern side. These forests mostly produce lumber and resin. These areas are estimated at 2,160,000 hectares, over half of which is pine forest. The most productive forests are located in the central and eastern portions of the state. Rainforest areas are estimated at 460,500 hectares. One problem facing the forested areas of the state is unsustainable logging. In addition to exploitable forest, there are also ecological reserves with tourist importance, especially the various monarch butterfly sanctuaries in the extreme east of the state.

=== Fishing ===
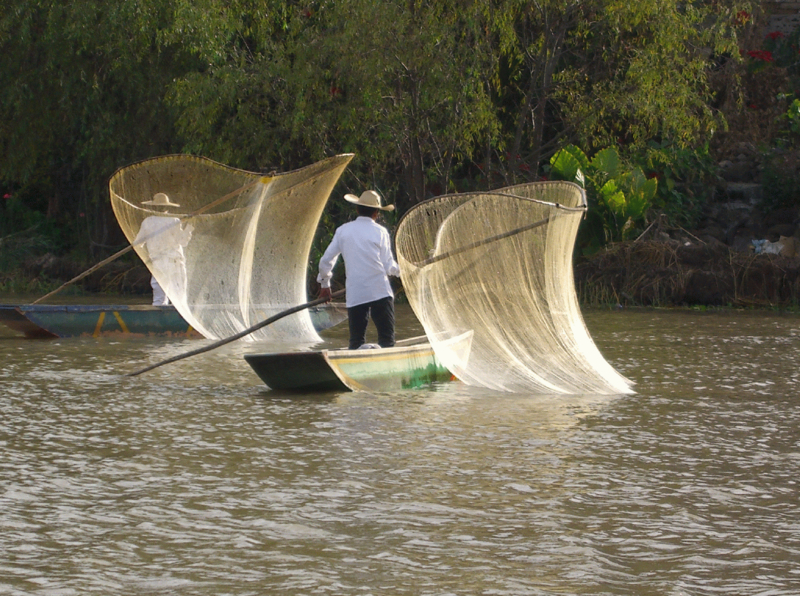
Fishermen in Lake Pátzcuaro

Michoacán's lakes, rivers and coastline make it an important producer of fish and seafood, both caught in the wild and farmed. The most important commercial fishing is for tilapia and carp.

=== Mining and minerals ===
Mining is an important economic activity in the state, which is mostly concentrated on the eastern side near the Mexico State border. However, iron is mined in the Lázaro Cárdenas area near the coast. Both metallic and non-metallic minerals are mined in the state. These include silver, gold, zinc, cadmium, lead, iron, copper, fill dirt, sand, gravel, lime, limestone, marble, and others. There are thirteen principal mining areas: Tlalpujahua, Angangueo, Los Azufres, Real de Otzumatlán, Tzitzio, Tiámaro, El Bastán, San Diego Curucupacéo, Inguarán, Las Truchas, and La Minita de Coalcomán. Michoacán is the second-largest producer of coke and third-largest producer of iron, which are essential to the steel industry, in Mexico. While there remains significant metallic deposits, their mining only contributes 1.64% to the economy.

=== Manufacturing ===
Most industrial activity is concentrated in the central region of the state, near the capital, where a number of industrial parks are located, such as Ciudad Industrial Morelia. However. there are other areas with industry, such as Apatzingán, Zamora, Jiquilpan and Sahuayo, as well as in the Lázaro Cárdenas area. Major production areas are iron and steel (34.27%), bottling (10.43%) and paper products (8.36%). Most people in the state are employed in service and commerce, and this sector contributes 19.07% to the overall economy. Most sales are in foodstuffs, drinks and tobacco.

== Transport ==
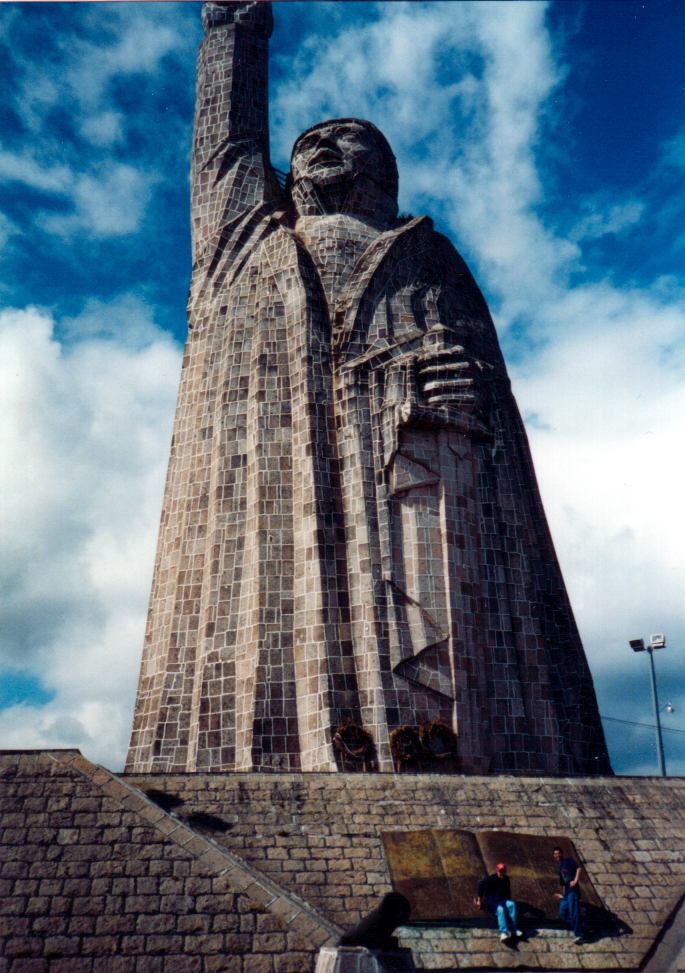
Statue of José María Morelos in Janitzio

The state contains more than 12,804 km (7,956 mi) of federal, state and local roads. Major highways in the state include Federal Highway 15 and the Morelia-Pátzcuaro highway. Intercity and interstate buses provide connections to places within the state and the rest of Mexico. About 91% of these bus lines are second class while just under nine percent are first class. Most rail lines are limited to the north and center of the state, providing freight service to Mexico City and Guadalajara. The state's main port is the city of Lázaro Cárdenas which contains 2,926 m (9,600 ft) of dock space. The dock is used mostly for the shipping of minerals and grains. There are two major international airports, Morelia International Airport and Uruapan International Airport. Smaller facilities exist in Zamora and Lázaro Cárdenas. The state has abundant hydroelectrical production due to dams on the Balsas River, the Lerma River and the Tepalcatepec River.

There are two cable car projects under construction as of 2025, one in Morelia and one in Uruapan. The system in Uruapan it was opened in April 2026.

== Media ==
One notable actress from Santa Elena, Michoacán is Elpidia Carrillo. She is best known for starring in the 1987 science fiction horror film Predator alongside Arnold Schwarzenegger.

As of 1995, the state had eight television stations, with seven out of operation. There is a system of educational television with 528 broadcast antennas.

Newspapers and news sites of Michoacán de Ocampo include: La Opinión de Apatzingán, a. m. de La Piedad, Diario ABC de Michoacán, El Diario Grande de Michoacán Provincia, El Sol de Morelia, El Sol de Zamora, Frecuencia Informativa Escrita , La Jornada Michoacán, La Opinión de Michoacán, La Voz de Michoacán.

== Education ==
The state provides public education from preschool level to high school. "Formal preschool" is offered in communities which have twenty five or more qualified students. Less formal preschools are operated in smaller communities. As of 1996, there were 5,433 primary schools serving 705,694 students with 25,485 teachers. There is a failure rate from grade to grade of about 9.7% with just under five percent leaving school permanently before finishing primary studies. The most common reason for departure is poverty. At the secondary level there are 174,354 students, which represent 22% of these eligible to attend. High school level studies are mostly geared to vocational studies and many attend via distance education. There are 24 public and private institutions of higher learning offering 49 different majors. Eight are technical colleges, four for teachers, the Universidad Michoacana de San Nicolás de Hidalgo, the Instituto Michoacano de Ciencias de la Educación and ten private institutions.

The Universidad Michoacana de San Nicolás de Hidalgo is located in Morelia. Its historical predecessor was founded in 1540, making it one of the oldest institutions of higher education in the Americas.

== Tourism ==
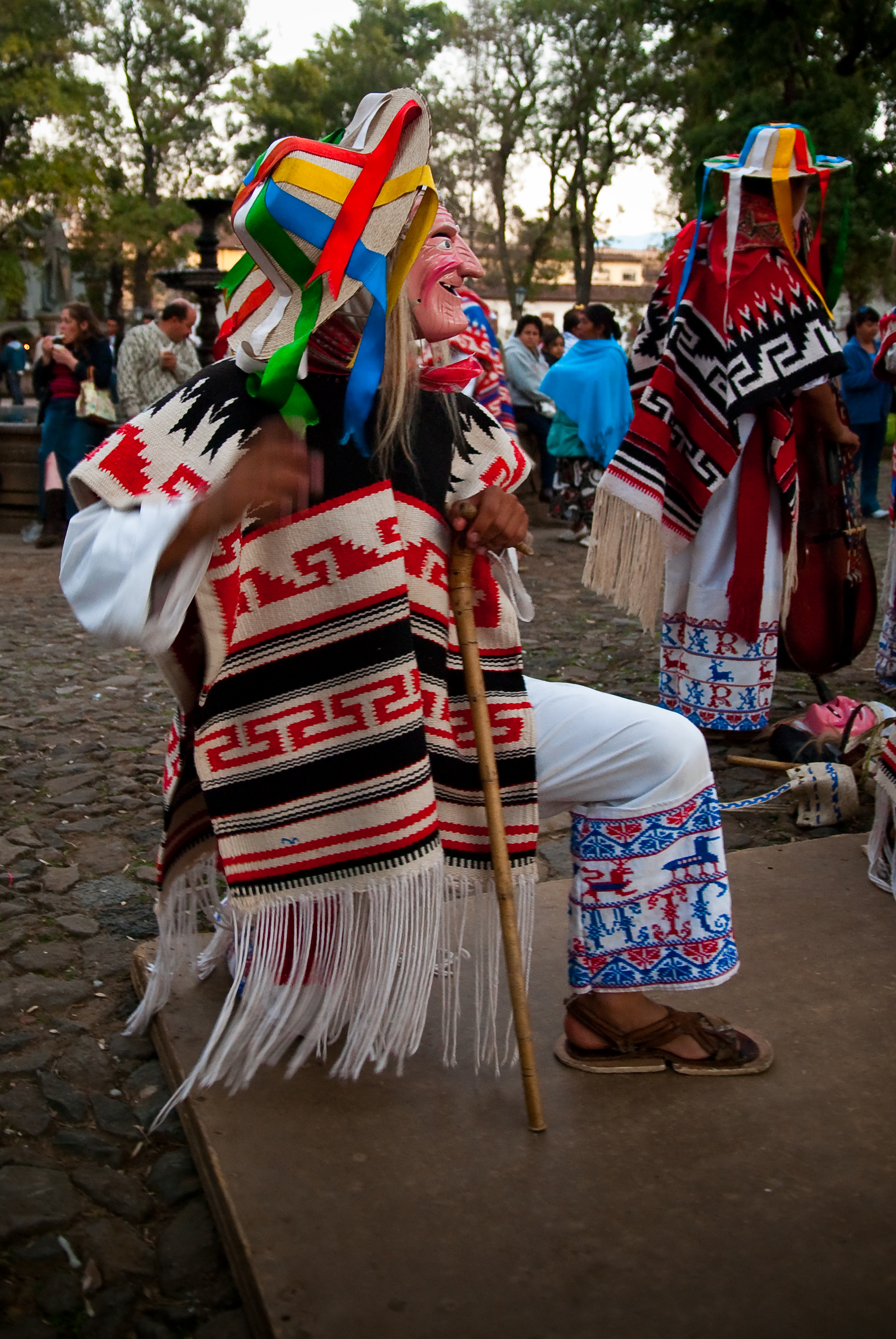
Danza de los Viejitos (Traditional folk dance of the Purépecha)

Carnitas are originally from Michoacán. Other traditional foods include cotija cheese, guacamole, morisqueta, tamales, pozole, enchiladas, mole sauce, and various sweets such as pan de muerto and chocolate champurrado (during the Day of the Dead celebrations), ice cream, churros, and ate, a kind of Mexican jelly made of many typical fruits.

The state ministry of tourism has divided the state into regions, mostly based on the major cities of Morelia, Uruapan, Pátzcuaro, Zamora, Lázaro Cárdenas, and Zitácuaro. The state contains a large number of potential attractions, most of which are classified as suitable for ecotourism. However, only 6.2% of these sites are visited by international tourists. Most visitors to sites are from within the state.

The Morelia region stresses its cultural and artistic heritage, especially its colonial architecture . The most important colonial structures are in Morelia and built in the 18th century. These include the cathedral, finished in 1744 and the main aqueduct finished at the end of the century. This architecture has made the city a World Heritage Site. In addition to the state capital, the region includes towns such as Charo, Capula, Tiripetio, Cuitzeo and Huandacareo, which contain archaeological sites, water parks and traditional cuisine. The rural areas of this zone contain more than 400 thermal springs, many of which have been turned into recreational areas and parks. These include Reino de Atzimba, Cointzio, Huandacareo and El Ejido. Morelia holds the annual Festival Internacional de Música de Morelia. The festival consists of more than forty concerts with over 500 artists from Michoacán and from around the world. Other festivals include the popular SalsaMich that features a 3-day Salsa dance competition. The Festival Internacional de Cine de Morelia is celebrated annually that is dedicated to Mexican cinema. The Plaza Monumental de Morelia was established in 1951, which was destined exclusively for bullfights. Nowadays, the ring also hosts concerts, lucha libre, and weddings.

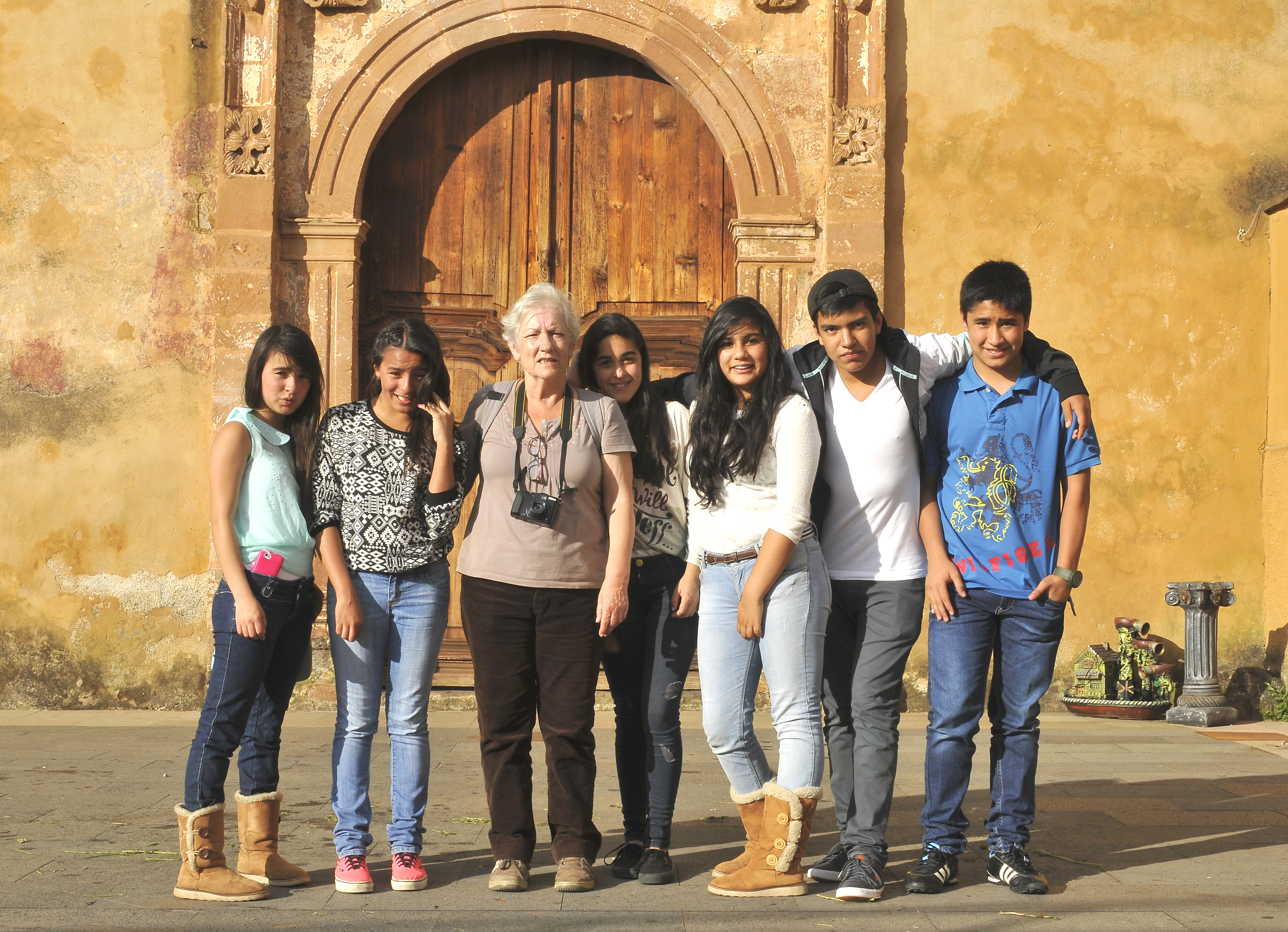
Tourist with locals in Pátzcuaro

The Uruapan region stresses its cultural and natural heritage. The city is one of the oldest settlements in the state, and was initially settled by the Meseta Purépecha peoples. This city contains a number of attractions such as La Huatápera, a colonial era hospital founded by Vasco de Quiroga, the Temple of San Francisco, and the Eduardo Ruiz Municipal Museum. Another attraction is the narrowest house in the world as documented by the Guinness Book of World Records. Other important cities in the region are Apatzingán and Caracha. Uruapan is surrounded by hundreds of hectares of forests and by fertile fields growing fruits and flowers, many of which only grow here. Some of the natural attractions of the zone include the Santa Catarina Dam and the La Tzaráacua and La Tzararacuita waterfalls. Smaller towns and villages in this region are known for their religious and popular festivals, many of which occur in the summer. Examples of these are the feasts of Señor del Calvario in Quinceo, of San Mateo Ahuiran in Paracho and the National Guitar Festival in Paracho. The best-known town in the region is San Juan Nuevo Parangaricutiro, which was founded due to the destruction of its original namesake by the eruption of the Paricutín volcano. The pre-Hispanic sites of Tingambato and Taretan are in this zone as well, which were important Purépecha cities.

The town of Paracho Mexico is a home to the craft off lutherie, the craft of building guitars and vihuelas. There are shopsin the town that sell mandolins, armadillo-backed guitars (concheras), acoustic bass guitars; as well as regular classical guitars and mandolins, bajo sextos, vihuelas, guitarrones and many others. Many of the stores and workshops allow visitors to watch the guitar-making process.

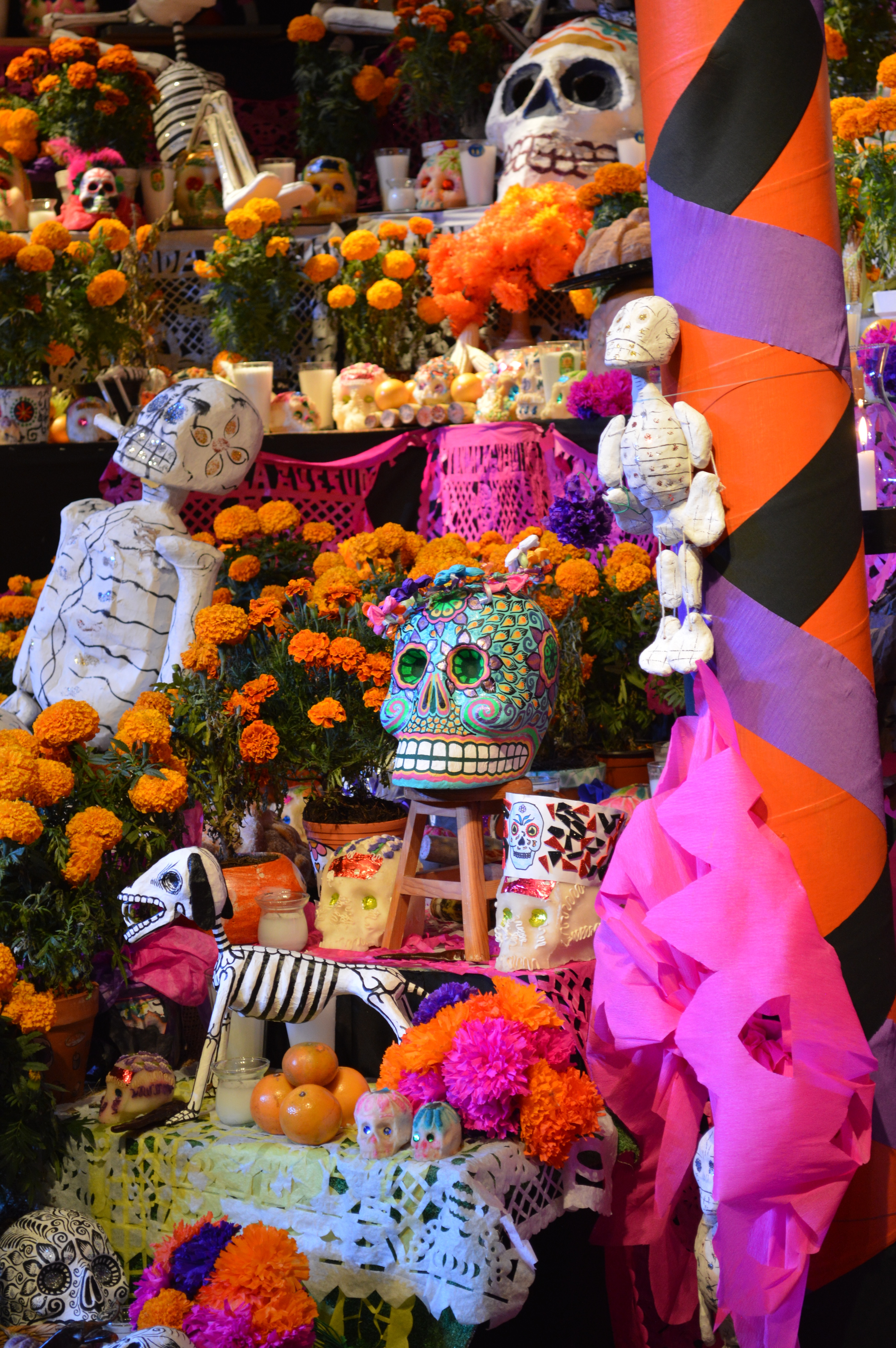
Noche de Muertos decorations

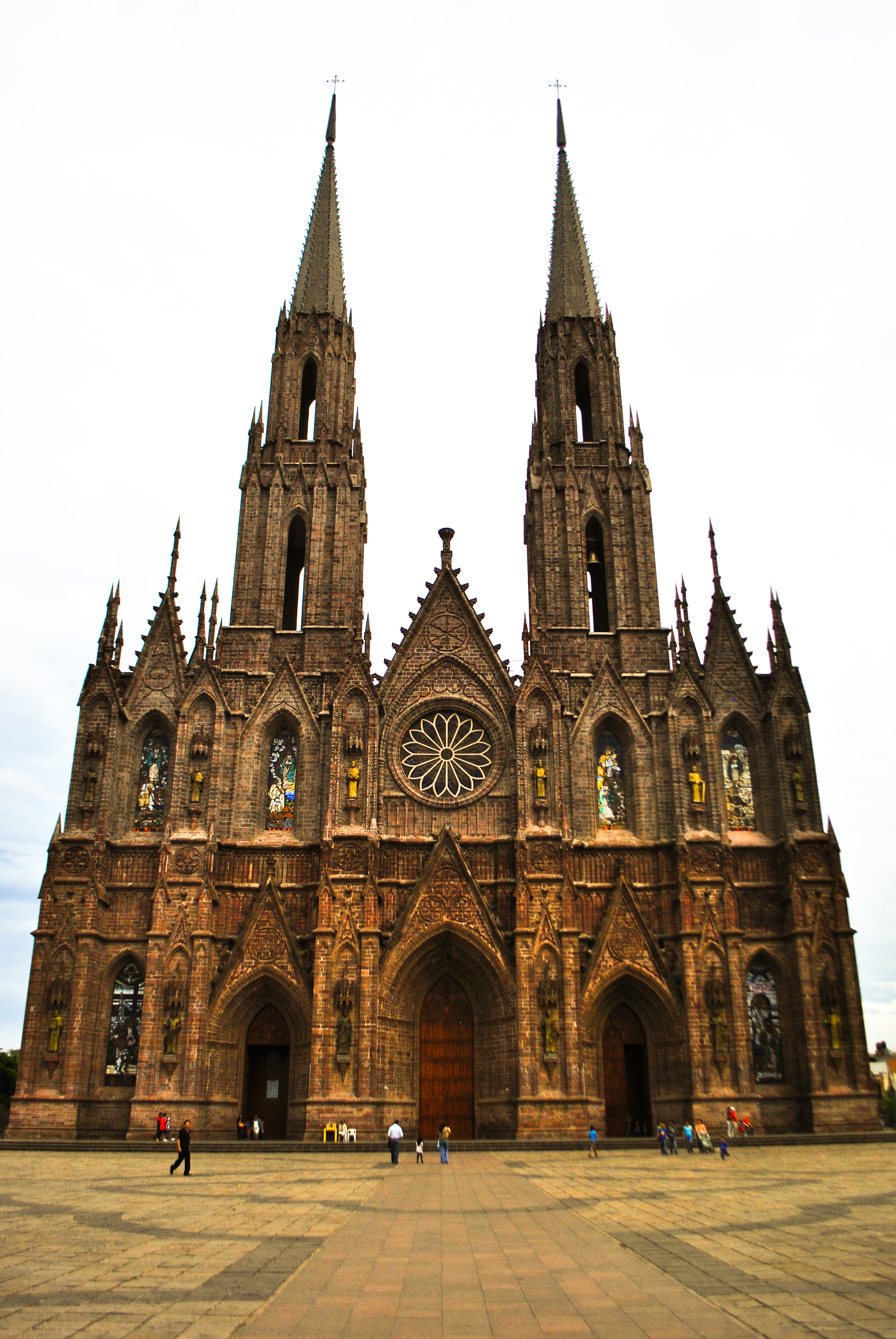
The Cathedral of Our Lady of Guadalupe in Zamora de Hidalgo

The Lázaro Cárdenas region is named after Michoacán's largest port and oceanside city. Here the state stresses the kilometres of beaches and other natural areas in which to practice ecotourism and extreme sports. Beaches include Maruata, Faro de Bucerías, the Pichi Estuary, La Laguna de Mezcala, La Ticla and Nexpa, with the last two popular for surfing, with their regular two-three-meter waves. A number of these beaches are protected areas, due to being a breeding ground for sea turtles.

The Pátzcuaro region is extremely important to the state due to its history of having been the center of the Purépecha Empire as well as the first capital of the colonial province of Michoacán. Its pre-Hispanic heritage is evident by the Tzintzuntzan and Ihuatizo sites as well as the large number of people who still speak the Purépecha language and maintain pre-Hispanic customs. Vasco de Quiroga established the first capital at Pátzcuaro and was instrumental to building the colonial era economy of the Lake Pátzcuaro area. The lake is surrounded by mountains and forests as well as the towns of Cuanajo, Tupátaro, Eronguícuaro and Quiroga. These towns are noted for their crafts and popular religious festivals such as the feast of the Señor del Rescate in Tzintzuntzan, Holy Week, and especially Noche de Muertos or Night of the Dead. This area is the most important to the state with the most visited town, Pátzcuaro with its basilica and museums.

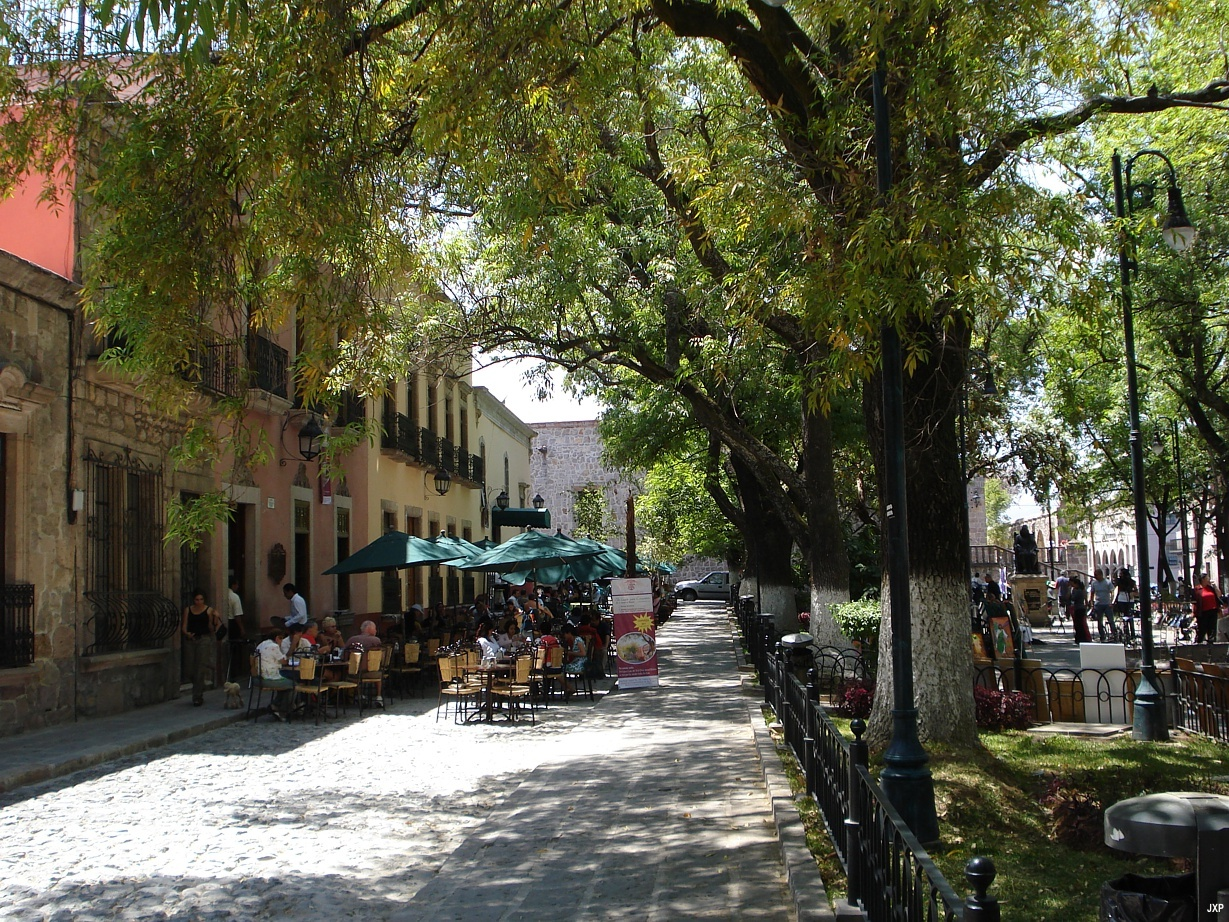
Jardin de las Rosas Garden and Park in Morelia

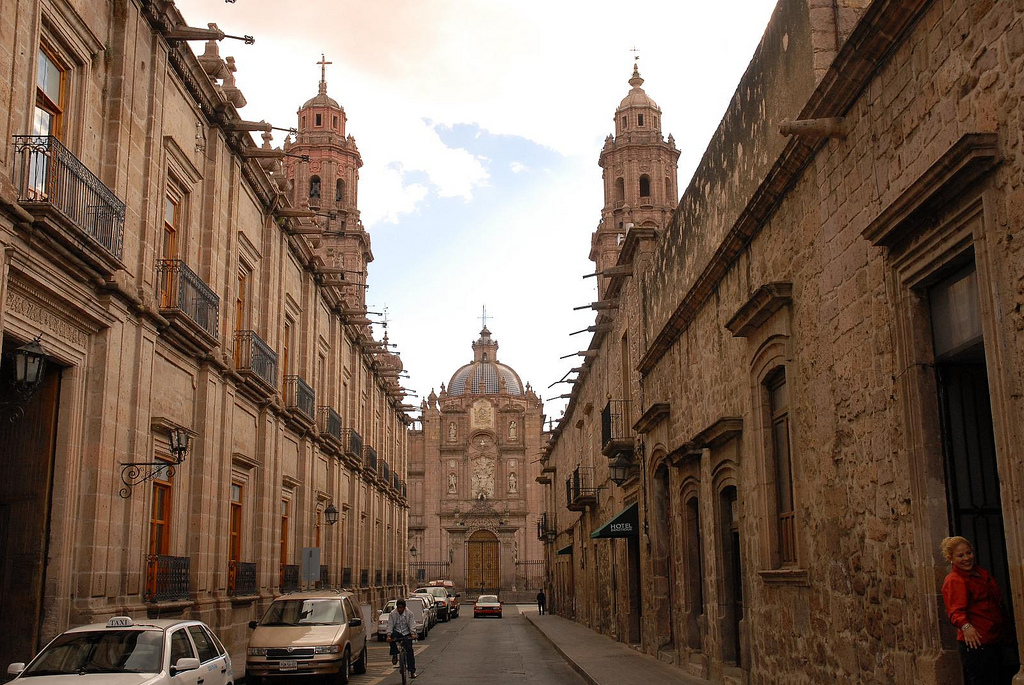
Street and Cathedral of Morelia

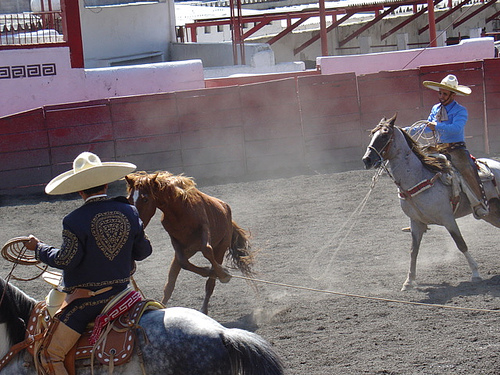
Traditional charro outfit

One of the largest tourist events in the state is Noche de Muertos or Night of the Dead. This is celebrated on the dates around November 2. Essentially, these are Day of the Dead celebrations, which are celebrated all over Mexico, but with unique variations. The events of these days show a blending of both pre-Hispanic and Catholic beliefs and traditions. Noche de Muertos is celebrated most strongly in the towns and villages around Lake Pátzcuaro such as Tzintzuntzan, Ihuatzio, Janitzio, as well as Pátzcuaro itself, which was the center of the Purépecha Empire. As in other parts of Mexico, altars to the dead, both in homes and on graves are erected and covered with offerings such as bread, fruit and other items. One aspect which is unique to the event here is the lighting and floating of hundreds of small candles and flowers on Lake Pátzcuaro on the night between November 1 and 2. It is also believed that on this night the ghosts of Mintzita, the daughter of Purépecha king Tzintzicha, and Itzihuapa arise. Their story is similar to that of Romeo and Juliet as they were never able to marry due to the Spanish invasion of their lands. Today, it is said that the two rise up and head toward a specific cemetery to receive visitors. There are a number of other rituals performed on these days such as the Terescuan y Campaneri, a kind of treasure hunt for hidden harvest items.

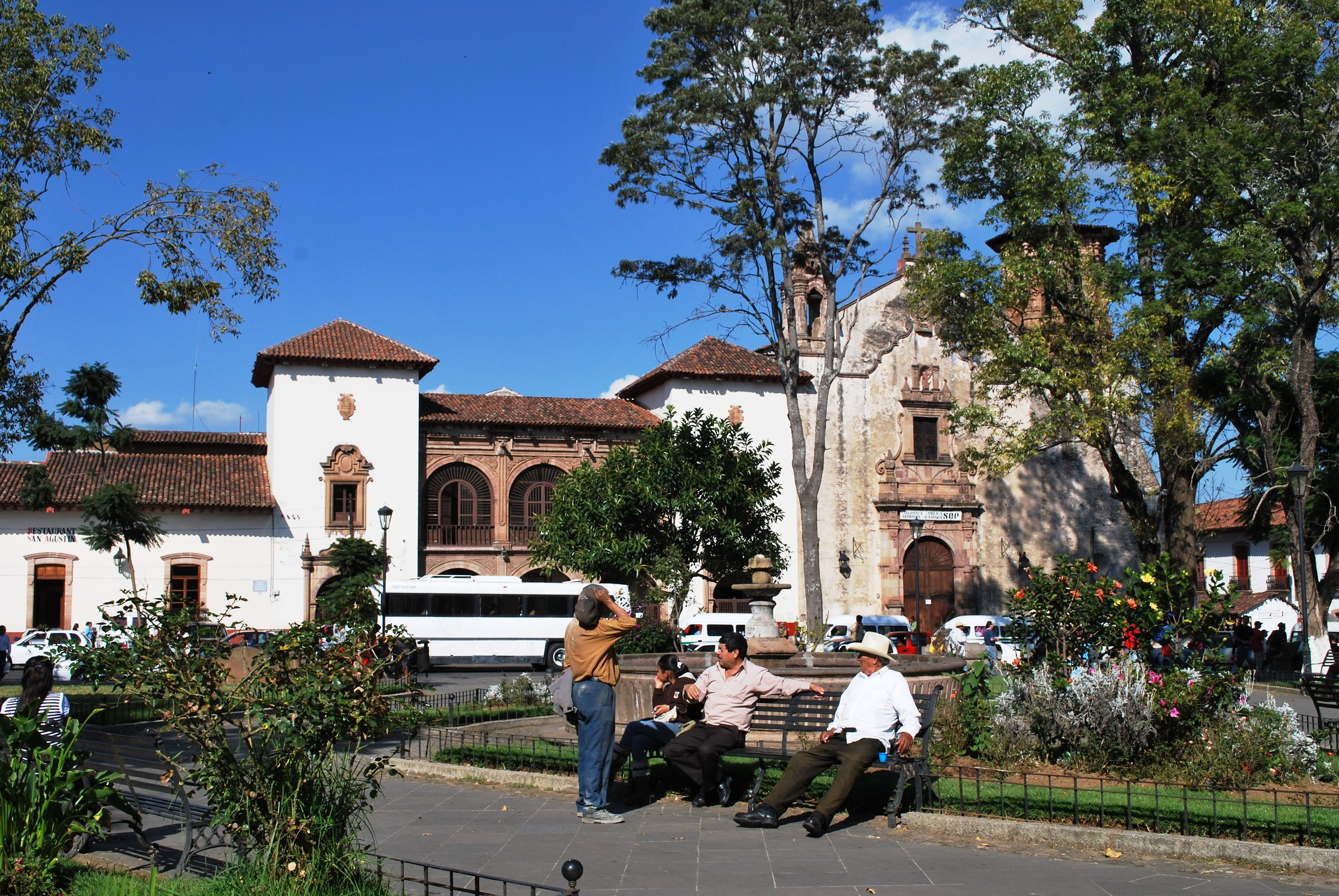
Gertrudis Bocanegra Plaza and the San Agustín Library in Pátzcuaro

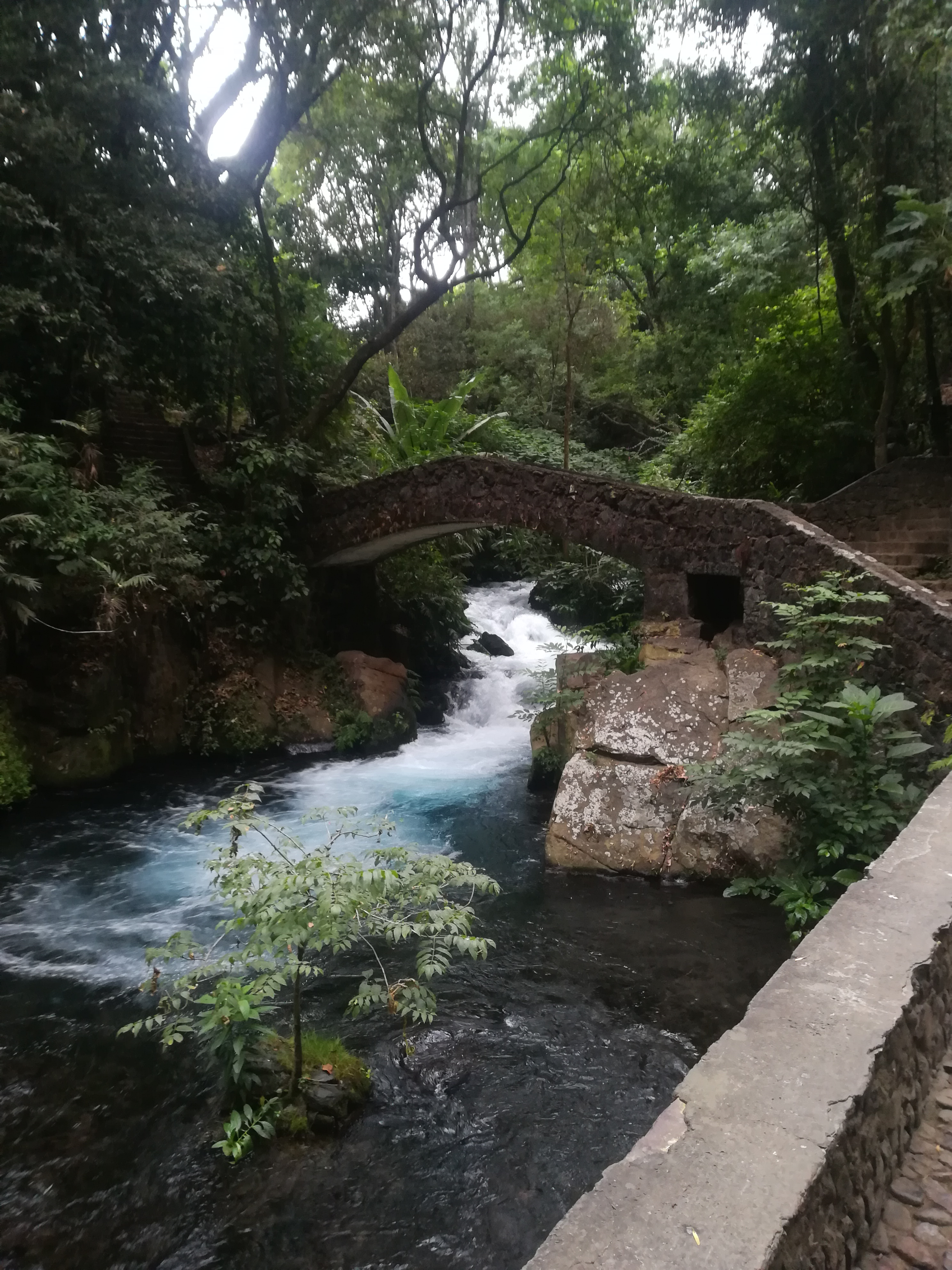
Cascada Parque Nacional in Uruapan

The Zamora region is in the northwestern part of the state in an area known as the Purépecha Mesa. Prehispanic languages and customs are preserved here as well as a large number of crafts such as the pottery of Ptamban and the embroidery of Tarecuato. The region is part of an area of Mexico known as the Bajío and has extensive agriculture, livestock and some industry. Regional dishes such as pigs' feet, breads baked in wood fired ovens, tamales, pozole and dishes made with avocados and corn are promoted here. Important towns outside of Zamora include Camécuaro, Orandiro, La Estancia and La Alberca. The city of Zamora is home to one of the oldest cultures in the west of Mexico which dates to about 1750 BCE, known as the Opeño. The Spanish city was founded as a military garrison.

The Zitácuaro region contains approximately a half million hectares of conifer forests, but is best known as being part of the wintering grounds of the monarch butterfly. The area is filled with old mining towns as well as an important archaeological site. The region is home to the Mazahua and Otomi peoples, many of whom produce crafts such as blankets, rebozos and ceramics. The city of Zitácuaro is the site of an important battle during the French Intervention in Mexico, which gives it the title of "Heroic City". Other important communities include Añgangueo, San Matias and Ciudad Hidalgo. The most important places to see monarch butterflies in the winter are in municipalities of Angangeo and Ocampo. The butterfly sanctuaries are called El Rosario, Cerro Campanario, Sierra Chincua and El Llanno de las Papas. In 2008, UNESCO declared this region part of a Monarch Butterfly Biosphere Reserve.

In total, there are 10 Pueblos Mágicos in Michoacán, in chronological order these are: Pátzcuaro, Tlalpujahua, Cuitzeo, Salvador Escalante, Angangueo, Tacámbaro, Tzintzuntzan, Jiquilpan, Paracho, and most recently Cotija in 2023.

== Crime ==
After the election of Vicente Fox in 2000, the Institutional Revolutionary Party (PRI) was no longer in power and there was a unexpected surge of criminal violence in Michoacán. From homicides and kidnappings to organized crime, the violence that began to emerge while in a position of political change had posed a significant threat to the nation's stability. Even though criminal groups and the state are on two ends of the spectrum, they are seen working together. Some criminal groups have an upper hand when it comes to the state and the sharing of information between the two happens as a mutually beneficial concept.

Criminal groups in Michoacán typically outgun the local security forces. With the heavy influence of criminal violence, even avocado farmers had to step in and combat this violence. Michoacán is the second largest avocado producer in the world, and with this profitable business comes organized crime that demands money from the avocado producers. Tancítaro has assembled the CUSEPT, civilian gunmen funded by local avocado growers, to protect against organized crime. Such non-governmental police groups have been formed because local police are sometimes seen as unhelpful or complicit. Turf disputes between rival cartels happens as well.

=== War on drugs ===
President Felipe Calderón first sent troops into Michoacán to regain control of the territory and fight the current drug cartels that had power when he took office in 2006. But his efforts backfired and ended up creating more violence instead. The number of homicides increased substantially. The state of Michoacán has one of the highest murder rates in Mexico. In 2013, the criminal group, the Knights Templar Cartel, essentially controlled the state. Although they eventually lost control, excessive criminal violence persisted.

=== Killings ===
Homicide happens frequently in Michoacán. On 26–28 October 2019, thirteen people, including four members of law enforcement, were killed in a firefight while performing a search warrant. Nine people, including three children, were killed in a video game arcade on February 3, 2020.

=== Kidnappings and ransoms ===
There have been aggressive disputes in the area, such as those over avocados.

=== Drug cartels ===
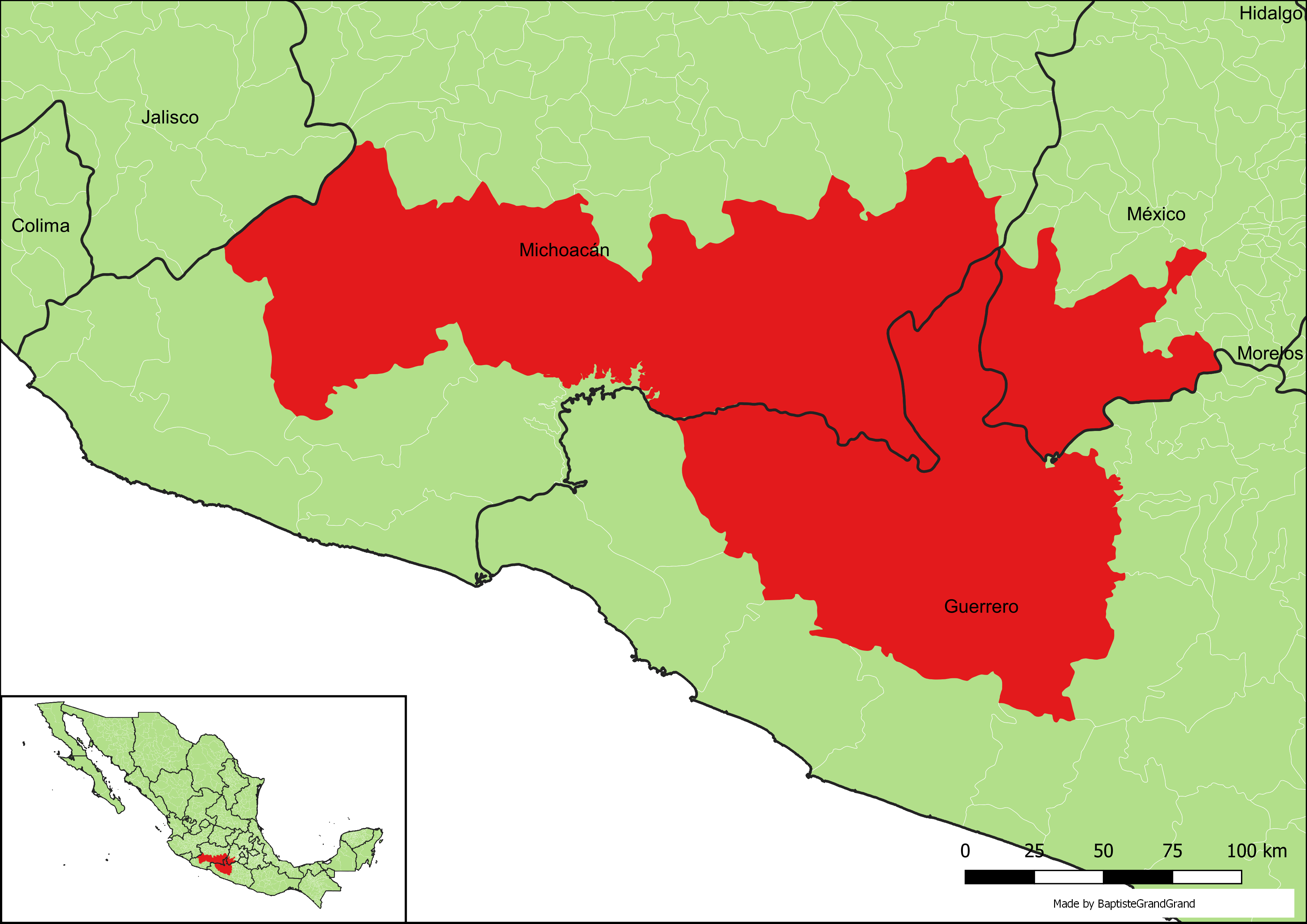
Michoacán, with Guerrero, covers much of the region of the Tierra Caliente

The rise of drug cartels in Michoacan as the state was going through a political change was pivotal. The cartels are able to pay state officials in bribes in exchange for keeping their criminal group up and successful. La Familia Michoacana, Jalisco New Generation Cartel, Los Zetas, Beltrán-Leyva Organization, the Knights Templar Cartel and Cárteles Unidos are some groups that operate in Michoacán. These groups are a threat to the government's security because Michoacán is now the center for drug production in the world. Drug cartels thrive in Michoacán due to what is called the Tierra Caliente in the southern part of the state. This region is rural and many parts are relatively inaccessible due to the terrain and lack of well-maintained roads, which makes it an ideal place for criminal activities.

=== Police and militia ===
Operation Michoacán, a major effort to combat drug cartels and crime in Michoacán, began in 2006 under the presidency of Felipe Calderón. There are many militias and vigilante groups in Michoacán that serve similar purposes.

=== Crime during COVID-19 ===
Due to crime, the United States Bureau of Consular Affairs advises not to travel to Michoacán (as of April 2021). During the COVID-19 pandemic, while the Mexican government was otherwise occupied, cartels took advantage as an opportunity to gain more power. In Michoacán, La Familia Michoacana cartel decided to give out food to the local community. This was an effort to further embed themselves in a position to control power and to show civilians that they need criminal groups like La Familia Michoacana.

== Demographics ==
Historical population
Year	Pop.	±%
1895	898,809	—
1900	935,808	+4.1%
1910	991,880	+6.0%
1921	939,849	−5.2%
1930	1,048,381	+11.5%
1940	1,182,003	+12.7%
1950	1,422,717	+20.4%
1960	1,851,876	+30.2%
1970	2,324,226	+25.5%
1980	2,868,824	+23.4%
1990	3,548,199	+23.7%
1995	3,870,604	+9.1%
2000	3,985,667	+3.0%
2005	3,966,073	−0.5%
2010	4,351,037	+9.7%
2015	4,584,471	+5.4%
2020	4,748,846	+3.6%

Michoacán is the seventh most populated state in Mexico and the average resident has a life expectancy of 73.3 years. It is estimated that each year about 40,000 people immigrate to the state while 78,000 leave, leading to population loss. Of those who leave, about one third go to other places in Mexico and the rest to other countries, principally the United States. The cities with the densest populations are Morelia, Uruapan and Zamora. The majority of the population are mestizos; meaning that they are part indigenous, part European (mainly from Spain), and some African. Michoacán is one of the most Catholic regions in Mexico.

Charreada is an important sport in the state. It celebrates the mestizo culture and heritage of Michoacán; in which the Spaniards employed the indigenous people as vaqueros or ranchers to herd cattle. During the Mexican Revolution, both sides used charros as soldiers. They were also used to maintain order against bandits. The typical Michoacán charro outfit consists of tight, embroidered pants and jacket, dress shirt, chaps, a cloak-like sarape, and a sombrero.

Michoacán has a history of European immigrants including: Italians, Spaniards, and the French. There are small Italian communities found throughout the state including the cities of Nueva Italia, Michoacán and Lombardia in Michoacán, both founded by Dante Cusi from Gambar in Brescia. During the Spanish Civil War, 456 children from Spain arrived in Morelia as refugees. Most of them stayed even after the war concluded.

The indigenous population is estimated at just over seven percent of the total, with most living in 29 municipalities. Many are Purépecha, which are located in the Meseta-Cañada, Pátzcuaro Lake, Zirahuén Lake, and Zacapu regions. In the east of the state, in the municipalities of Ocampo, Anguangueo, Tuxpan, Hidalgo, Maravatío and Zitácuaro, there is a mix of Mazahua, Otomi and Purépecha. On the coast can be found the Aquila, Chinicuila and Coahuayana peoples. The Purépecha are seen as Michoacán's most devoted Catholics; as well as mixing traditional indigenous elements such as Noche de Muertos.

According to the 2020 Census, 1.55% of Michoacán's population identified as Black, Afro-Mexican, or of African descent.

== Municipalities ==
Michoacán, as all states of Mexico, is divided into municipalities (municipios), creating 113 municipalities of Michoacán.

=== Largest cities ===
Largest cities or towns in Michoacán Source:
Rank		Municipality	Pop.
1	Morelia	Morelia	743,275
2	Uruapan del Progreso	Uruapan	299,253
3	Zamora de Hidalgo	Zamora	154,546
4	Apatzingán de la Constitución	Apatzingán	102,362
5	La Piedad de Cabadas	La Piedad	87,042
6	Zitácuaro	Zitácuaro	86,901
7	Ciudad Lázaro Cárdenas	Lázaro Cárdenas	83,637
8	Ciudad Hidalgo	Hidalgo	71,528
9	Sahuayo de Morelos	Sahuayo	70,042
10	Jacona de Plancarte	Jacona	61,510

=== Cities and communities ===
- Apatzingán
- Churumuco
- Ciudad Hidalgo
- Coalcomán
- Cotija
- El Rodeo de San Antonio
- Irimbo
- Jacona de Plancarte
- Jiquilpan
- Jungapeo
- La Huacana
- La Piedad de Cavadas
- Lázaro Cárdenas
- Los Reyes
- Maravatio
- Morelia
- Nueva Italia
- Pátzcuaro
- Puruandiro
- Quiroga
- Sahuayo de Morelos
- Santa Ana Maya
- Santa Inés
- Tacámbaro
- Tangancícuaro
- Tepalcatepec
- Uruapan
- Venustiano Carranza
- Villa Madero
- Villamar
- Yurécuaro
- Zacapu
- Zamora de Hidalgo
- Zináparo
- Zinapécuaro
- Zitácuaro

== See also ==
- Purépecha Empire
- La Familia Michoacana
- Ghosts in Mexican culture
- Agriculture in Michoacán
- Handcrafts and folk art in Michoacán
- Category:Natural history of Michoacán

== Sources ==
- Pollard, Helen Perlstein (2000). "Tarascans and Their Ancestors: Prehistory of Michoacán". In Foster, Michael S.; Gorenstein, Shirley (eds.). Greater Mesoamerica: The Archaeology of West and Northwest Mexico. Salt Lake City, United States: University of Utah Press. pp. 59–70. ISBN 978-0-874-80655-7.
