= 1st federal electoral district of Michoacán =

Federal electoral district of Mexico

Michoacán's 1st
- Electoral district of the Chamber of Deputies of Mexico

- 1st district since 2023

Incumbent
- Member: Leonel Godoy
- Party: ▌Morena
- Congress: 66th (2024–2027)

District
- State: Michoacán
- Head town: Lázaro Cárdenas
- Coordinates: 17°57′N 102°11′W
- Covers: 10 municipalities: Ario, Arteaga, Churumuco, Gabriel Zamora, La Huacana, Lázaro Cárdenas, Múgica, Nuevo Urecho, Parácuaro, Tumbiscatío
- PR region: Fifth
- Precincts: 211
- Population: 404,102 (2020 census)

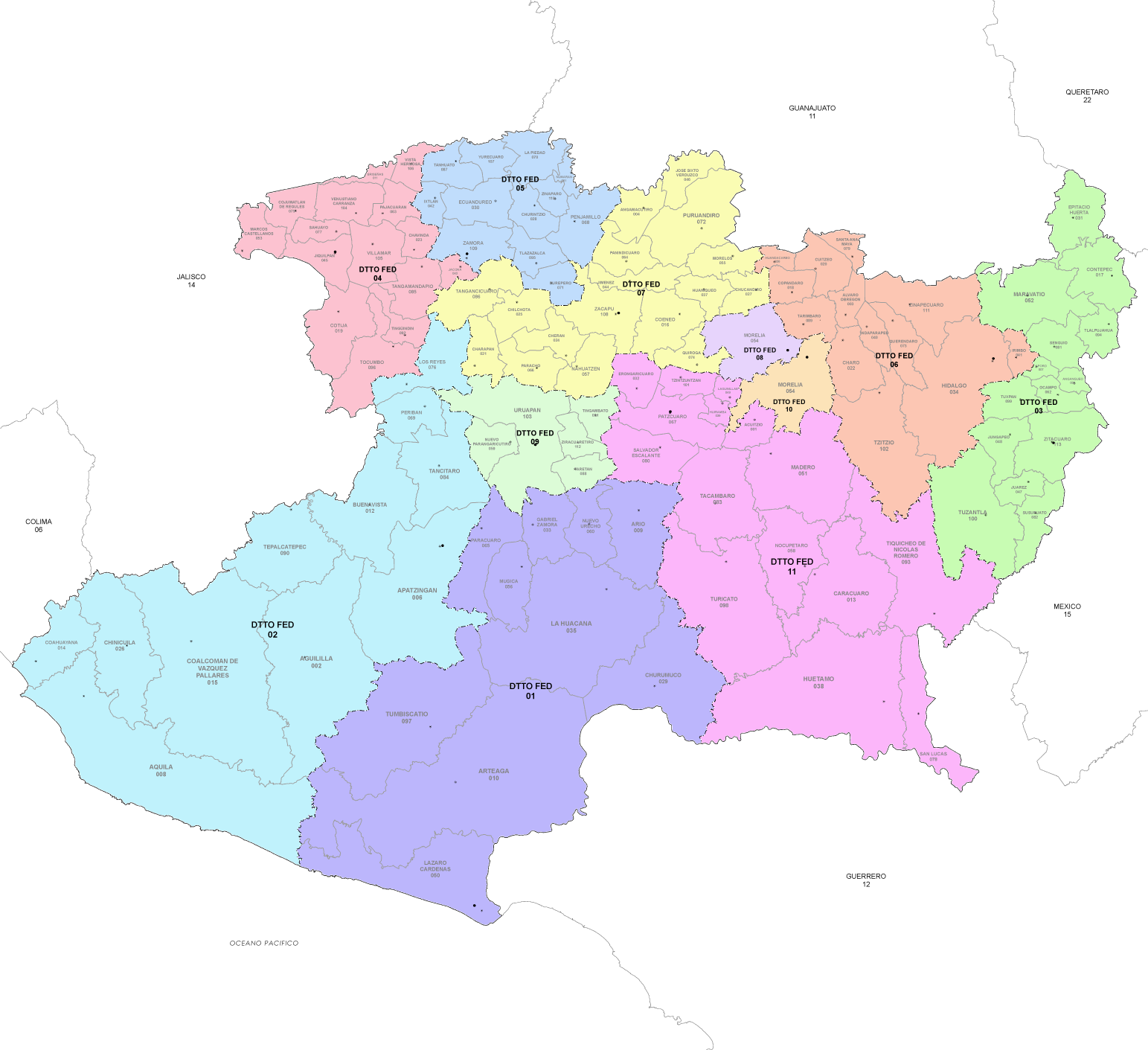
Michoacán's federal electoral districts since 2023

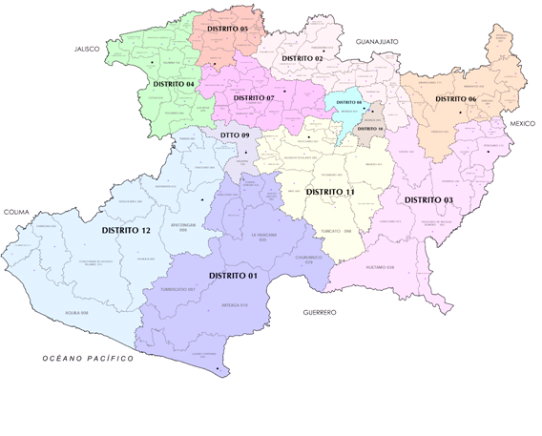
Michoacán under the 2017–2022 districting scheme

The 1st federal electoral district of Michoacán (Spanish: Distrito electoral federal 01 de Michoacán) is one of the 300 electoral districts into which Mexico is divided for elections to the federal Chamber of Deputies and one of 11 such districts in the state of Michoacán.

It elects one deputy to the lower house of Congress for each three-year legislative session by means of the first-past-the-post system. Votes cast in the district also count towards the calculation of proportional representation ("plurinominal") deputies elected from the fifth region.

The current member for the district, re-elected in the 2024 general election, is Leonel Godoy Rangel of the National Regeneration Movement (Morena).

== District territory ==
Michoacán lost its 12th district in the 2023 districting process carried out by the National Electoral Institute (INE). Under the new districting plan, which is to be used for the 2024, 2027 and 2030 federal elections, the 1st district covers 211 precincts (secciones electorales) across ten municipalities in the south of the state:

- Ario, Arteaga, Churumuco, Gabriel Zamora, La Huacana, Lázaro Cárdenas, Múgica, Nuevo Urecho, Parácuaro and Tumbiscatío.

The head town (cabecera distrital), where results from individual polling stations are gathered together and tallied, is the port city of Lázaro Cárdenas. The district reported a population of 404,102 in the 2020 census.

== Previous districting schemes ==
Evolution of electoral district numbers
	1974	1978	1996	2005	2017	2023
Michoacán	9	13	13	12	12	11
Chamber of Deputies	196	300				

2017–2022

Between 2017 and 2022, the district had almost the same configuration as in the current scheme. Its head town was at Lázaro Cárdenas and it covered nine of the 2023 municipalities, with Ario assigned to the 11th district.

2005–2017

Under the 2005 districting plan, Michoacán lost its 13th district. The 1st district's head town was at Lázaro Cárdenas and it comprised the municipalities of Ario, Arteaga, Churumuco, La Huacana, Lázaro Cárdenas, Múgica, Nuevo Urecho and Tumbiscatío; i.e., the 2023 municipalities, minus Gabriel Zamora and Parácuaro.

1996–2005

Under the 1996 districting plan, the 1st district was located in the north-west of the state. Its head town was the city of La Piedad and it covered 11 municipalities: Briseñas, Churintzio, Ecuandureo, La Piedad, Penjamillo, Purépero, Tanhuato, Tlazazalca, Vista Hermosa, Yurécuaro and Zináparo.

1978–1996

The districting scheme in force from 1978 to 1996 was the result of the 1977 electoral reforms, which increased the number of single-member seats in the Chamber of Deputies from 196 to 300. Under the reforms, Michoacán's district allocation rose from 9 to 13. The 1st district covered the state capital, the city of Morelia.

== Deputies returned to Congress ==
(Mexico) National parties
- Current
- PAN
- PRI
- PT
- PVEM
- MC
- Morena
- PAZ
- Somos
- Defunct or local only
- PLM
- PNR
- PRM
- PNM
- PP
- PPS
- PARM
- PFCRN
- CON
- PANAL
- PSD
- PES
- PES
- PRD

Michoacán's 1st district
Election	Deputy	Party	Term	Legislature
1916	Francisco Ortiz Rubio (Note: Ortiz Rubio requested that he be excused from the proceedings for the space of one month on 15 December 1916; he was replaced during his absence by his alternate, Ruiz Neri.); José Pilar Ruiz Neri		1916–1917	Constituent Congress of Querétaro
...
1976	Nicanor Gómez Reyes	Institutional Revolutionary Party	1976–1979	50th Congress
1979	Marco Antonio Aguilar Cortés	Institutional Revolutionary Party	1979–1982	51st Congress
1982	Francisco Xavier Ovando	Institutional Revolutionary Party	1982–1985	52nd Congress
1985	Macario Rosas Zaragoza	Institutional Revolutionary Party	1985–1988	53rd Congress
1988	Octavio Ortiz Melgarejo	Authentic Party of the Mexican Revolution	1988–1991	54th Congress
1991	Jorge Mendoza Álvarez	Institutional Revolutionary Party	1991–1994	55th Congress
1994	María Guadalupe Morales Ledesma	Institutional Revolutionary Party	1994–1997	56th Congress
1997	Guadalupe Sánchez Martínez	Party of the Democratic Revolution	1997–2000	57th Congress
2000	Jaime Rodríguez López	Institutional Revolutionary Party	2000–2003	58th Congress
2003	Alejandro Saldaña Villaseñor	Institutional Revolutionary Party	2003–2006	59th Congress
2006	Antonio Soto Sánchez	Party of the Democratic Revolution	2006–2009	60th Congress
2009	Julio César Godoy Toscano (Note: On 14 December 2010 Godoy Toscano was stripped of his parliamentary immunity on suspicions of ties with organized crime; he was replaced by his alternate, Madrigal Ceja.); Israel Madrigal Ceja	Party of the Democratic Revolution	2009–2010; 2010–2012	61st Congress
2012	Rodimiro Barrera Estrada	Party of the Democratic Revolution	2012–2015	62nd Congress
2015	Salomón Fernando Rosales Reyes	Institutional Revolutionary Party	2015–2018	63rd Congress
2018	Feliciano Flores Anguiano	National Regeneration Movement	2018–2021	64th Congress
2021	Leonel Godoy Rangel	National Regeneration Movement	2021–2024	65th Congress
2024	Leonel Godoy Rangel	National Regeneration Movement	2024–2027	66th Congress

== Presidential elections ==
Michoacán's 1st district
Election	District won by	Party or coalition	%
2018	Andrés Manuel López Obrador	Juntos Haremos Historia	66.7354
2024	Claudia Sheinbaum Pardo	Sigamos Haciendo Historia	73.0623
