= 9th federal electoral district of Michoacán =

Federal electoral district of Mexico

Michoacán's 9th
- Electoral district of the Chamber of Deputies of Mexico

- 9th district since 2023

Incumbent
- Member: Guadalupe Araceli Mendoza Arias
- Party: ▌Independent
- Congress: 66th (2024–2027)

District
- State: Michoacán
- Head town: Uruapan
- Coordinates: 19°25′N 102°03′W
- Covers: Nuevo Parangaricutiro, Taretan, Tingambato, Uruapan, Ziracuaretiro
- PR region: Fifth
- Precincts: 179
- Population: 428,017 (2020 census)

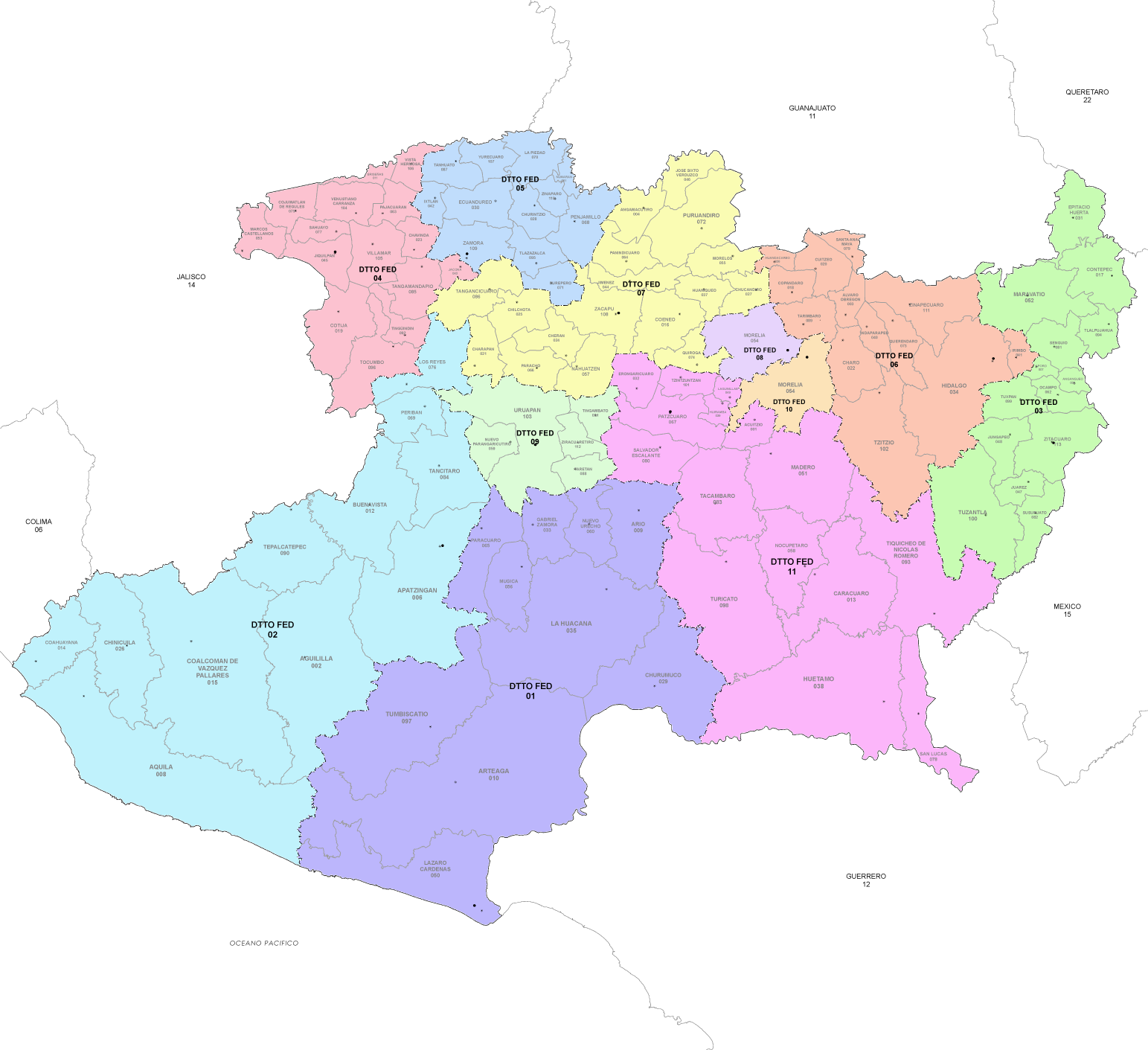
Michoacán's federal electoral districts since 2023

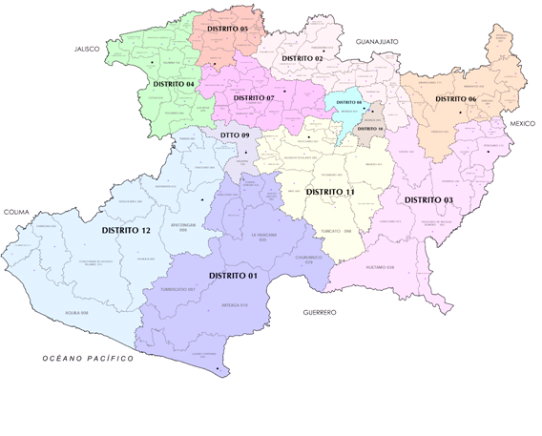
Michoacán under the 2017–2022 districting scheme

The 9th federal electoral district of Michoacán (Spanish: Distrito electoral federal 09 de Michoacán) is one of the 300 electoral districts into which Mexico is divided for elections to the federal Chamber of Deputies and one of 11 such districts in the state of Michoacán.

It elects one deputy to the lower house of Congress for each three-year legislative session by means of the first-past-the-post system. Votes cast in the district also count towards the calculation of proportional representation ("plurinominal") deputies elected from the fifth region.

The current member for the district, elected in the 2024 general election, is Guadalupe Araceli Mendoza Arias of the Movimiento del sombrero, the only deputy returned in that election without the support of a registered party.

== District territory ==
Michoacán lost its 12th district in the 2023 districting process carried out by the National Electoral Institute (INE). Under the new districting plan, which is to be used for the 2024, 2027 and 2030 federal elections, the 9th district covers 179 precincts (secciones electorales) across five municipalities in the centre-west of the state:

- Nuevo Parangaricutiro, Taretan, Tingambato, Uruapan and Ziracuaretiro.

The head town (cabecera distrital), where results from individual polling stations are gathered together and tallied, is the state's second largest city, Uruapan. The district reported a population of 428,017 in the 2020 census.

== Previous districting schemes ==
Evolution of electoral district numbers
	1974	1978	1996	2005	2017	2023
Michoacán	9	13	13	12	12	11
Chamber of Deputies	196	300				

2017–2022

Between 2017 and 2022, the district's head town was at Uruapan and it comprised solely that city and its surrounding municipality.

2005–2017

Under the 2005 districting plan, Michoacán lost its 13th district. The 9th district's head town was at Uruapan and it covered six municipalities:
- Nuevo Parangaricutiro, Taretan, Tingambato, Uruapan and Ziracuaretiro, as in the 2023 plan, plus Gabriel Zamora.

1996–2005

Under the 1996 districting plan, the district's head town was at Uruapan and it covered seven municipalities:
- Charapan, Paracho, and the five from the 2023 plan: Nuevo Parangaricutiro, Taretan, Tingambato, Uruapan and Ziracuaretiro.

1978–1996

The districting scheme in force from 1978 to 1996 was the result of the 1977 electoral reforms, which increased the number of single-member seats in the Chamber of Deputies from 196 to 300. Under the reforms, Michoacán's allocation rose from 9 to 13. The 9th district's head town was the city of Apatzingán de la Constitución and it comprised four municipalities:
- Apatzingán, La Huacana, Múgica and Parácuaro.

== Deputies returned to Congress ==
(Mexico) National parties
- Current
- PAN
- PRI
- PT
- PVEM
- MC
- Morena
- PAZ
- Somos
- Defunct or local only
- PLM
- PNR
- PRM
- PNM
- PP
- PPS
- PARM
- PFCRN
- CON
- PANAL
- PSD
- PES
- PES
- PRD

Michoacán's 9th district
Election	Deputy	Party	Term	Legislature
1916	Martín Castrejón		1916–1917	Constituent Congress of Querétaro
...
1979	Alfonso Quintero Larios	Institutional Revolutionary Party	1979–1982	51st Congress
1982	Juan Villegas Torres	Institutional Revolutionary Party	1982–1985	52nd Congress
1985	Juan Carlos Velasco Pérez	Institutional Revolutionary Party	1985–1988	53rd Congress
1988	Raúl Reyes Ramírez	Popular Socialist Party (Mexico)	1988–1991	54th Congress
1991	Jaime Calleja Andrade	Institutional Revolutionary Party	1991–1994	55th Congress
1994	Roldán Álvarez Ayala	Party of the Democratic Revolution	1994–1997	56th Congress
1997	Enrique Bautista Villegas	Party of the Democratic Revolution	1997–2000	57th Congress
2000	Jesús Garibay García	Party of the Democratic Revolution	2000–2003	58th Congress
2003	Carlos Hernán Silva	Party of the Democratic Revolution	2003–2006	59th Congress
2006	Fausto Mendoza Maldonado	Party of the Democratic Revolution	2006–2009	60th Congress
2009	Uriel López Paredes	Party of the Democratic Revolution	2009–2012	61st Congress
2012	Socorro de la Luz Quintana León	Institutional Revolutionary Party	2012–2015	62nd Congress
2015	Ángel II Alanís Pedraza	Party of the Democratic Revolution	2015–2018	63rd Congress
2018	Ignacio Campos Equihua	National Regeneration Movement	2018–2021	64th Congress
2021	Carlos Alberto Manzo Rodríguez (Note: Manzo Rodríguez resigned his seat on 27 February 2024 to contend (successfully) for the municipal presidency of Uruapan as an independent.); Esteban Rafael Constantino Magaña	National Regeneration Movement	2021–2024	65th Congress
2024	Guadalupe Araceli Mendoza Arias (Note: Mendoza Arias is the only non-party deputy to be elected to the 66th Congress.)	Independent politician	2024–2027	66th Congress

== Presidential elections ==
Michoacán's 9th district
Election	District won by	Party or coalition	%
2018	Andrés Manuel López Obrador	Juntos Haremos Historia	53.8824
2024	Claudia Sheinbaum Pardo	Sigamos Haciendo Historia	53.6960
