= Hurricane Nora (2021) =

Category 1 Pacific hurricane in 2021

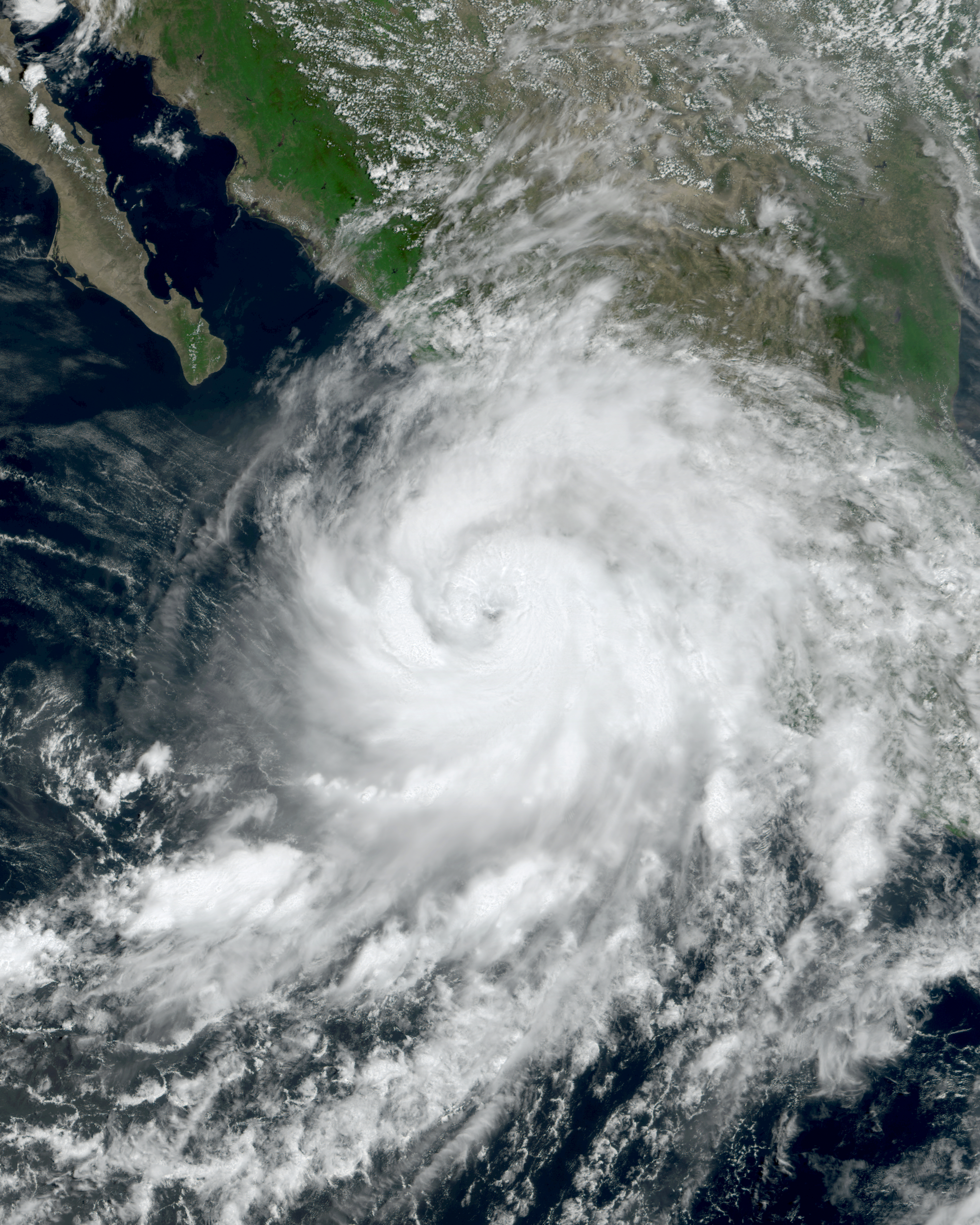
- Nora at peak intensity off the western coast of Mexico on August 28

Meteorological history
- Formed: August 24, 2021
- Dissipated: August 30, 2021

Category 1 hurricane
- 1-minute sustained (SSHWS/NWS)
- Highest winds: 85 mph (140 km/h)
- Lowest pressure: 977 mbar (hPa); 28.85 inHg

Overall effects
- Fatalities: 3 total
- Damage: $192 million (2021 USD)
- Areas affected: Western Mexico
- IBTrACS
- Part of the 2021 Pacific hurricane season

Hurricane Nora was a large tropical cyclone that caused significant damage across the Pacific Coast of Mexico in late August 2021. The fourteenth named storm and fifth hurricane of the 2021 Pacific hurricane season, Nora was first monitored by the National Hurricane Center (NHC) as an area of low pressure near the coast of Mexico. On August 24, the low organized into tropical depression, but struggled to develop further due to wind shear in its surrounding environment. The depression eventually intensified into a tropical storm and was named Nora as it tracked to the west-northwest. Nora peaked as a strong Category 1 hurricane with maximum sustained winds of 85 miles per hour (140 km/h) on August 28. The storm then grazed the west coast of Mexico and made landfall two separate times, first in the state of Jalisco, followed by neighboring Nayarit. Nora weakened as it interacted with land, dissipating on August 30 just inland of the Mexican coast.

Nora caused extensive and destructive flooding as the cyclone traversed the coast of Mexico, with rainfall accumulations peaking at 523 mm (20.6 in) in the town of Melchor Ocampo in Michoacán. Severe damage was reported to homes, businesses and hotels across several states in western Mexico. Overflowing rivers inundated numerous cities and rural areas. Three people died as a result of the hurricane, and a total of Mex$3.86 billion (US$192 million) in damage occurred throughout Mexico.

== Meteorological history ==
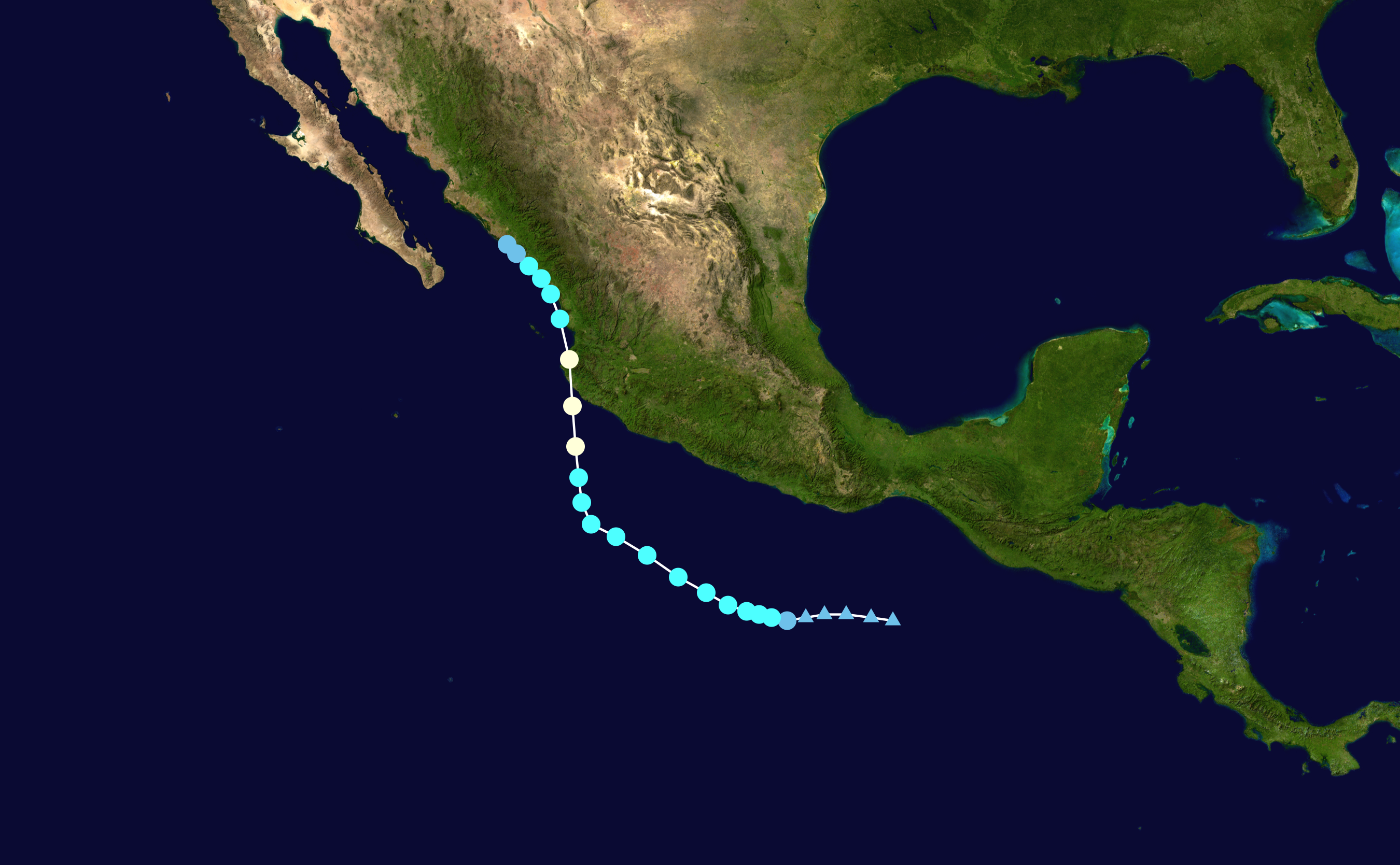
Map plotting the storm's track and intensity, according to the Saffir–Simpson scale Map key Saffir–Simpson scale Tropical depression (≤38 mph, ≤62 km/h) Tropical storm (39–73 mph, 63–118 km/h) Category 1 (74–95 mph, 119–153 km/h) Category 2 (96–110 mph, 154–177 km/h) Category 3 (111–129 mph, 178–208 km/h) Category 4 (130–156 mph, 209–251 km/h) Category 5 (≥157 mph, ≥252 km/h) Unknown Storm type Tropical cyclone Subtropical cyclone Extratropical cyclone, remnant low, tropical disturbance, or monsoon depression

Hurricane Nora originated from a tropical wave that emerged off Africa on August 13. It quickly moved westward over next few days, and at 15:00 UTC of August 19 as it moved into the Caribbean Sea, the National Hurricane Center (NHC) first indicated the possible development of an area of low pressure to the south of the coast of Mexico, giving it a 20% chance of forming in the next five days. The NHC further raised the system's probability of intensification occurrence to "medium" and then to "high" on the next day, and by August 24, a broad area of low pressure formed over warm sea surface temperatures. Scatterometer data on August 25 reported that a well-defined but small area of circulation inside the low-pressure area and was producing near tropical storm-force winds, with the NHC designating the disturbance as a tropical depression at 12:00 UTC of August 25. 6 hours later at 18:00 UTC, scatterometer data prompted the system's upgrade to a tropical storm, gaining the name Nora. Nora continued westward over a favorable environment for development. It became disorganized that night, with its convection being displaced to the northwest due to wind shear, as evidenced by satellite and microwave imageries.

Nora began to turn slightly northwest by the next day, with a decline in wind shear allowing the storm to strengthen and develop convection on August 27. Nora then began to turn north-northwestward, with it forming an eye on August 28. Its developing inner core became wrapped by deep convection with cold cloud tops, and by 12:00 UTC, Nora was upgraded to a Category 1 hurricane. At 15:00 UTC, microwave imagery showed that it had a closed eyewall. Later that same day at, Nora reached its peak intensity with maximum sustained winds reaching 85 miles per hour (140 km/h) and a minimal barometric pressure of 977 hPa (28.85 inHg), with its center grazing the coast of wester Jalisco, Mexico. on August 29, at 19:00 UTC, Nora was downgraded to a tropical storm due to land interaction within the coastline of mexico despite the warm sea surface temperatures within the gulf coast of California. This weakening trend would continue until Nora was downgraded to a remnant low early on August 30 as satellite analysts were unable to identify a low level center and scatterometer and synoptic data showed no surface circulation associated with Nora, thus dissipated that morning.

== Preparations, impact and aftermath ==
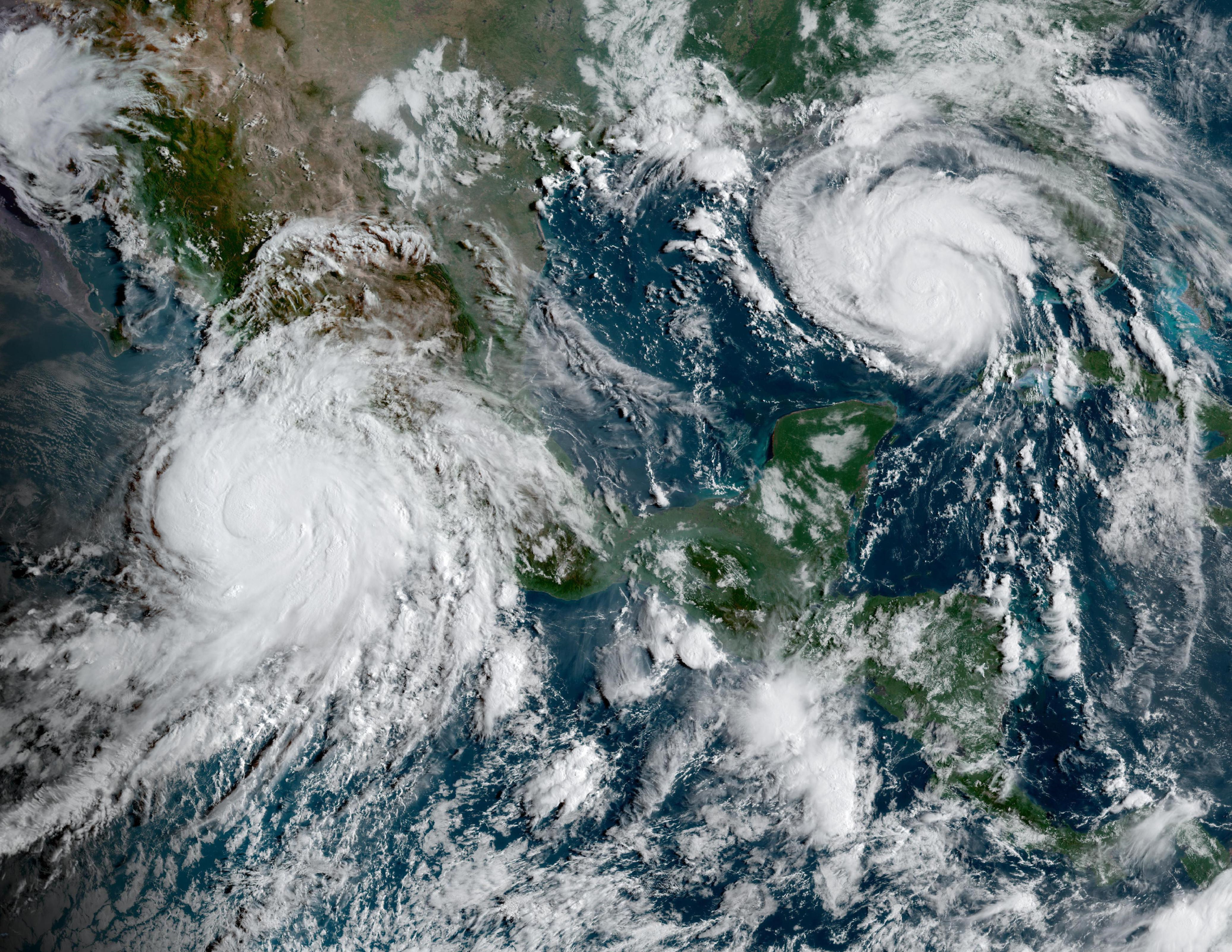
Captured on GOES-16 on Saturday August 28 at 14:00 (UTC), Hurricane Nora (left) and Hurricane Ida (right) both active simultaneously.

On August 30, the National Hurricane Center issued a hurricane warning from San Blas, Nayarit to Altata, Sinaloa. Hurricane watches and tropical storm warnings were issued in Altata to Topolobampo. Tropical storm watches were put in place from Cabo San Lucas and La Paz, Baja California Sur. The Servicio Meteorológico Nacional called for extreme precaution in the states of Colima, Michoacán, Guerrero, Oaxaca, and Jalisco. It was recommended for locals to get away from beaches and other low-lying areas that could be affected by high waves, avoid parking in wave-prone areas, and to go to safe areas defined by authorities. People who lived in areas threatened by Nora's flooding were monitored to give them the resources needed in the aftermath if they were affected.

Heavy rainfall occurred across the western coast of Mexico, with 300 mm (12 in) being recorded across coastal regions in Guerrero, Colima, Michoacán, Jalisco, Nayarit, and Sinaloa. A peak rainfall total of 523 mm (20.6 in) occurred at Melchor Ocampo, Michoacán. A total of 444.8 mm (17.51 in) of rain registered at José María Morelos y Pavón, Michoacán, and 421.2 mm (16.58 in) was recorded at the Observatorio de Mazatlán, Sinaloa. The storm left impacts in 44 municipalities and approximately 355,000 people without power. 30 rivers in Mexico had overflowed due to the flooding. In Chiapas, the body of a member of the Mexican Air Force was later found after he had been swept away by the strong currents. Severe damage occurred across Jalisco. In Puerto Vallarta, a bridge collapsed into the Cuale River, and buildings near the river were damaged. Overflowing rivers, falling trees, fallen power lines, and landslides prompted the closure of the Guadalajara–Colima highway and the El Grullo-Ciudad Guzmán state highway. At the latter, a landslide dropped a person into a 120 m (390 ft) deep ravine and injured two others. A construction worker also died in a landslide on a road connecting Ciudad Guzmán and San Gabriel. The Arroyo El Pedregal river overflowed in Melaque, Cihuatlán municipality, damaging at least 500 homes. Two people were reported missing in the municipality. The Bahía de Banderas was evacuated as the level of the Ameca River continued to increase, with a temporary shelter being established in San Vicente. Power outages were reported in the former city as a result of downed electrical lines and poles. A child also died in the collapse of a hotel, which was associated with Nora, and another person was reported to be missing. On September 5, a fisherman's body was found at a beach in Marquelia, Guerrero. In Ciudad Guzmán, flooding from the Los Volcanes river inundated some urban areas. Overall, three people were killed by the storm. Nora was responsible for 3.86 billion pesos (US$192 million) in damage, and Sinaloa was the hardest-hit state with 1.31 billion pesos (US$65 million) in damage.

The Government of Michoacán declared states of emergency for the municipalities of Arteaga, Lázaro Cárdenas, Tumbiscatio, Aquila, and Coahuayana in the wake of Nora. A road leading to Uruapan also collapsed and was closed by authorities. Landslides also damaged a highway between Uruapan and Lombardí. Mudslides made a road leading to the city of Morelia impassable. In the Port of Lázaro Cárdenas, the Acalpican river overflowed, causing flooding on August 29. There also were reports of other floods, landslides, and uprooted trees in Michoacán. In the municipal seat of Arteaga, the Toscano river flooded, which caused several cars to be dragged by the flow. Multiple homes and businesses were damaged. Federal, state, and municipal authorities worked on coastal roads to help restore communication damage caused by downed lines and trees.

== See also ==
- Weather of 2021
- Tropical cyclones in 2021
- List of Category 1 Pacific hurricanes
- Other storms of the same name
- Hurricane Manuel (2013) – Another Category 1 hurricane that caused heavy damage in northwestern Mexico
- Hurricane Olaf (2021) – Affected similar areas less than two weeks later
