= Agriculture in Michoacán =

Agriculture in Michoacán is the primary economic industry of the Mexican state of Michoacán, with avocado production being particularly important. In 2018, the state produced 1,674,855 tonnes of avocados, accounting for 76.7% of Mexico's production, while 166,604 hectares were planted with the crop, representing 72% of the national planted area. Both avocado production and planted area increased substantially between 1980 and 2018.

The avocado industry in Michoacán has been affected by organized crime. Criminal groups have extorted orchard owners, seized land, and cleared protected forests for avocado cultivation, while competition over the industry has contributed to violence. Illegal planting associated with avocado cultivation has contributed to the deforestation of pine and holm oak forests.

== Economic importance ==
As of 2017, agriculture in Michoacán, including livestock, formed the state’s primary economic industry. Of particular importance is the avocado sector; Mexico produces more avocadoes than any other country, and Michoacán is the primary growing area.

=== Avocado ===
Hass avocado is a hybrid’s result from a Mexican and a Guatemalan varieties. In 2017, more than 2 million 29 thousand metric tonnes of avocado were harvested in Mexico, 82.7% of which came from production in the state of Michoacán. The climate required to grow Hass avocado is a temperature ranging from 8 to 21 Celsius degrees and 1,200 to 1,600 mm annual precipitation (1 mm is equivalent to 1 water liter per square meter). Likewise, it is advisable to grow it between 800 and 2,500 m above sea level, on well-drained clay soils or clay-loam soils.

Avocado is among Mexico's top agricultural exports, its production accounts for 4.39% of the national GDP and 8.84% of the country’s fruit production. Its foreign trade’s evolution has considerably grown; in 2011, 951 million dollars were exported, while 2961 million dollars were exported in 2017. Exports to the US went from 4,859 tonnes in 1990 to 917,070 in 2018 (see Table 1).

The state of Michoacán, has gone from planting 30,979 hectares in 1980 to planting up to 166,604 in 2018; being the state with the greatest growth (see Table 2). It was also the state with the greatest growth in avocado production; in 1980, it produced 141,221 tonnes, and 1,674,855 in 2018 (see Table 3). In percentage terms, Michoacán represents 76.7% of the national volume and 72% of the planted surface (see Table 4). Likewise, the average and gross yields of the avocado production in Michoacán have considerably grown throughout time, this was highlighted by the exports to the US in 1997, 2004, and 2011.

Table 1.-Export of avocado tonnes from Mexico to the US and the rest of the world)
Year	US	World
1990	4,859	17,427
1995	4,726	54,595
2000	13,396	89,270
2005	145,111	229,166
2010	269,985	368,615
2015	808,310	989,721
2018	917,070	1,198,203

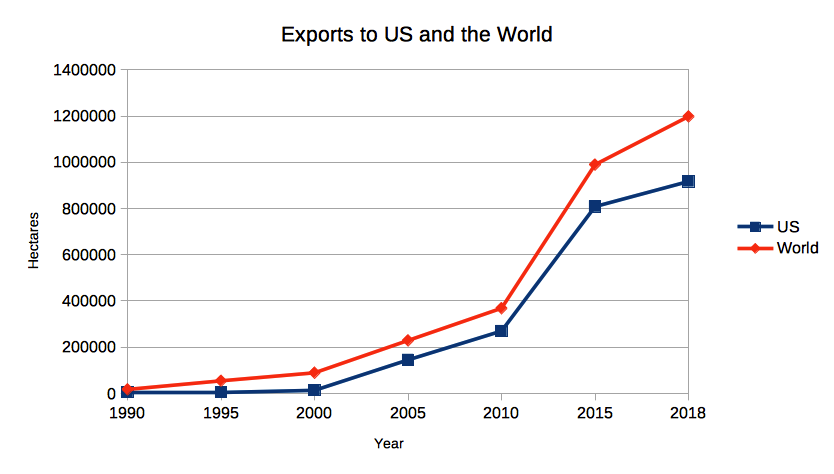
Data: Consejo Mexicano para el Desarrollo Rural Sustentable con datos del Servicio de Información Agroalimentaria y Pesquera

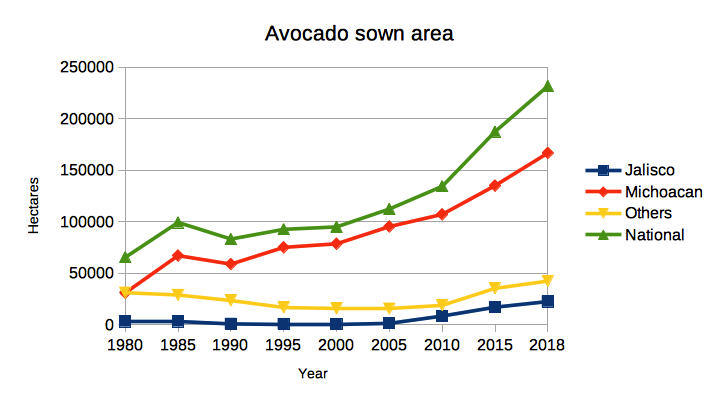
Data: Consejo Mexicano para el Desarrollo Rural Sustentable con datos del Servicio de Información Agroalimentaria y Pesquera

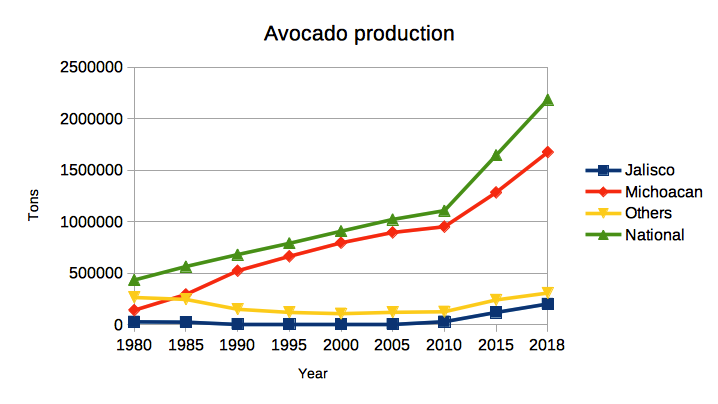
Data: Consejo Mexicano para el Desarrollo Rural Sustentable con datos del Servicio de Información Agroalimentaria y Pesquera

Table 2.- Avocado sown area (Hectares)
Year	Jalisco	Michoacán	Others	National
1980	3,250	30,979	31,132	65,361
1985	3,278	67,091	28,901	99,270
1990	844	58,798	23,490	83,132
1995	696	75,075	16,775	92,546
2000	654	78,530	15,707	94,892
2005	1,385	95,223	15,643	112,251
2010	8,468	107,058	18,796	134,322
2015	17,041	134,942	35,344	187,327
2018	22,529	166,604	42,391	231,524

Table 3.- Avocado Production (Tons)
Year	Jalisco	Michoacán	Others	National
1980	28,377	141,221	264,661	434,259
1985	25,257	294,332	245,720	565,309
1990	6,769	523,483	150,316	680,568
1995	6,650	663,636	119,744	790,030
2000	5,213	794,681	107,415	907,309
2005	5,911	895,098	120,506	1,021,515
2010	29,987	950,942	126,206	1,107,135
2015	119,647	1,283,313	241,265	1,644,226
2018	201,804	1,674,855	308,004	2,184,663

Table 4.- Main producing entities 2018
State	Tonnes	% National	Hectares	% National	Millions Pesos	% National
Michoacán	1,674,855	76.7	166,604	72.0	34,405	82.1
Jalisco	201,804	9.2	22,529	9.7	3,072	7.3
México	97,806	4.5	10,458	4.5	1,725	4.1
Nayarit	57,563	2.6	7,063	3.1	807	1.9
Morelos	43,644	2.0	5,433	2.3	540	1.3
Otros	108,991	5.0	19,438	8.4	1,359	3.2
Nacional	2,184,663	100	231,524	100	41,908	100

==== Municipalities that produce avocados ====
Geographically, Michoacán's avocado-producing zone represents 12.9% of the state’s territory. In 2003, the main avocado-producing municipalities were Uruapan, Tancítaro, Peribán, Tacámbaro, Nuevo Parangaricutiro, Salvador Escalante, Tingüindín, Ario, Los Reyes, Tingambato, and Ziracuaretiro (see Table 5); producing 800,452 tonnes in total. By 2018, the main municipalities’ production increased to 1,674,855 tonnes, an over 100% increase. Turicato joined the main avocado-producing municipalities that year (and Tingambato lost ground, see Table 6).

Table 5.- Main Avocado Producing Municipalities in Michoacán in 2003
Municipality	Tonnes
Uruapan	146,426
Tancítaro	130,899
Peribán	121,047
Tacámbaro	97,078
Nuevo Parangaricutiro	56,759
Salvador Escalante	55,150
Tingüindín	54,611
Ario	51,028
Los Reyes	26,796
Tingambato	13,743
Ziracuaretiro	13,408

Table 6.- Main Avocado Producing Municipalities in Michoacán in 2018
Municipality	Tonnes
Tancítaro	237,435
Salvador Escalante	182,929
Tacámbaro	180,463
Uruapan	176,542
Ario	173,511
Peribán	142,975
Nuevo Parangaricutiro	78,695
Los Reyes	66,696
Tingüindín	60,265
Turicato	55,047
Ziracuaretiro	50,700

==== Organized crime and avocado growing ====
The avocado industry in the state of Michoacán has become part of the growing interest of organized crime. They focus their action on three main areas: charging rent fees to the orchards’ owners, confiscation of the fields, and clearing protected forests to grow avocado trees. The wealth produced by growing avocado in the state of Michoacán has increased the collection of rent fees, extorsion, and land grabbing by several criminal organizations. This has created a struggle between drug cartels to control the territory, causing the people who live there to become entrapped in violence.

It is estimated that in 2019, drug trafficking cost 5,000 million Mexican pesos yearly to the avocado producers in the state of Michoacán. Also, violence in the region affects bilateral relations between Mexico and the United States, since the president of the Association of Avocado Producers (APEAM in Spanish) reported that the USDA inspectors have been held by criminal organizations. Likewise, Donald Trump’s administration threatened to stop avocado from the state of Michoacán exports due to the high rates of violence and the growing competitiveness to export avocado in other places from Latin America, such as Colombia and Peru.

Likewise, the violence suffered in the state has caused hundreds of families to migrate. Also, extortion and other criminal practices have not been limited to avocado producers, but implemented in the whole agricultural production in Michoacán, from the owners of crop fields to laborers. Another consequence of the intrusion of criminal organizations in Michoacán’s agriculture is illegal planting that lead to the deforestation of thousands of hectares of pine and holm oak forests.
