= La Huacana =

La Huacana may refer to

- La Huacana Municipality
- La Huacana, La Huacana, place in La Huacana Municipality
- La Huacana, San Lucas, place in San Lucas Municipality, Michoacán
