= Israel Madrigal Ceja =

Mexican politician

- Born: 28 August 1975 (age 51); Tumbiscatío, Michoacán, Mexico
- Occupation: Politician
- Political party: PRD

Israel Madrigal Ceja (born 28 August 1975) is a Mexican politician from the Party of the Democratic Revolution (PRD). From 2010 to 2012 he sat in the Chamber of Deputies representing Michoacán's first district as the alternate of Julio César Godoy Toscano, who was impeached on 14 December 2010.
