= 13th federal electoral district of Michoacán =

Defunct federal electoral district of Mexico

Coordinates: 17°57′N 102°11′W

The 13th federal electoral district of Michoacán (Spanish: Distrito electoral federal 13 de Michoacán) is a defunct federal electoral district of the Mexican state of Michoacán.

During its existence, the 13th district returned one deputy to the lower house of Congress for each legislative session by means of the first-past-the-post system. From 1979 onwards, votes cast in the district also counted towards the calculation of proportional representation ("plurinominal") deputies elected from the country's electoral regions.

Suspended in 1930, (Note: An amendment to Article 52 of the Constitution in 1928 changed the original provision of "one deputy per 60,000 inhabitants" to "one deputy per 100,000"; as a result, the size of the Chamber of Deputies fell from 281 in the 1928 election to 171 in 1934.) it was re-established as part of the 1977 political reforms. The restored 13th district was first contested in the 1979 mid-term election and it elected its final deputy in the 2003 mid-terms. It was dissolved by the Federal Electoral Institute (IFE) in its 2004/05 redistricting process because the state's population no longer warranted 13 districts.

== District territory ==
Evolution of electoral district numbers
	1974	1978	1996	2005	2017	2023
Michoacán	9	13	13	12	12	11
Chamber of Deputies	196	300				

1996–2005

In its final form, the 13th district comprised eight municipalities in the south-west of the state, along the border with Jalisco and Colima and the Pacific Ocean coast:
- Aquila, Arteaga, Chinicuila, Coahuayana, Coalcoman, Lázaro Cárdenas, Tepalcatepec and Tumbiscatio
The district's head town (cabecera distrital), where results from individual polling stations are gathered together and tallied, was the port city of Lázaro Cárdenas.

1978–1996

The districting scheme in force from 1978 to 1996 was the result of the 1977 electoral reforms, which increased the number of single-member seats in the Chamber of Deputies from 196 to 300. Under the reforms, Michoacán's allocation rose from 9 to 13. The restored 13th district's head town was at Lázaro Cárdenas and it comprised nine municipalities:
- Aguililla, Aquila, Arteaga, Buenavista, Chinicuila, Coahuayana, Coalcomán, Lázaro Cárdenas and Tepalcatepec.

== Deputies returned to Congress ==
(Mexico) National parties
- Current
- PAN
- PRI
- PT
- PVEM
- MC
- Morena
- Defunct or local only
- PLM
- PNR
- PRM
- PNM
- PP
- PPS
- PARM
- PFCRN
- Convergencia
- PANAL
- PSD
- PES
- PES
- PRD

Michoacán's 13th district
Election	Deputy	Party	Term	Legislature
1916	Rafael Márquez		1916–1917	Constituent Congress of Querétaro
1917	Vacant		1917–1918	27th Congress
1918	Alejandro R. Aceves		1918–1920	28th Congress
1920	José Bravo Betancourt		1920–1922	29th Congress
1922	Antonio Valladares		1922–1924	30th Congress
1924	J. Jesús Pineda		1924–1926	31st Congress
1926	Austreberto Muratalla Torres		1926–1928	32nd Congress
1928	Vacant		1928–1930	33rd Congress
The 13th district was suspended between 1930 and 1979
1979	José Luis González Aguilera	Institutional Revolutionary Party	1979–1982	51st Congress
1982	María Antonia Vázquez Segura	Institutional Revolutionary Party	1982–1985	52nd Congress
1985	Ignacio Ramos Espinoza	Institutional Revolutionary Party	1985–1988	53rd Congress
1988	Rafael Melgoza Radillo	Popular Socialist Party (Mexico)	1988–1991	54th Congress
1991	José Francisco Moreno Barragán	Institutional Revolutionary Party	1991–1994	55th Congress
1994	Desiderio Camacho Garibo	Party of the Democratic Revolution	1994–1997	56th Congress
1997	Antonio Soto Sánchez	Party of the Democratic Revolution	1997–2000	57th Congress
2000	Rogaciano Morales Reyes	Party of the Democratic Revolution	2000–2003	58th Congress
2003	Rafael García Tinajero Pérez	Party of the Democratic Revolution	2003–2006	59th Congress
