= Rodimiro Barrera Estrada =

Mexican politician

- Born: 20 March 1968 (age 58); Churumuco, Michoacán, Mexico
- Occupation: Politician
- Political party: PRI

Rodimiro Barrera Estrada (born 20 March 1968) is a Mexican politician affiliated with the Institutional Revolutionary Party (PRI).

In the 2012 general election he was elected to the Chamber of Deputies to represent Michoacán's first district for the 2012–2015 term.
