= Jesús Garibay García =

Mexican politician (born 1946)

- Born: 24 November 1946 (age 79); Coalcomán de Vázquez Pallares, Michoacán, Mexico
- Occupation: Politician
- Political party: PRD

José de Jesús Garibay García (born 24 November 1946) is a Mexican politician affiliated with the Party of the Democratic Revolution (PRD). In 2007–2009 he served in the Senate during the 60th Congress representing Michoacán as the replacement of Leonel Godoy Rangel. He also served in the Chamber of Deputies for Michoacán's ninth district during the 58th Congress (2000–2003).
