= Mugica =

Mugica or Múgica (in Basque Muxika) is a Basque surname. Variations: Mujica, Mújica, Mújico, Mujika, Mugika and Mojica.

- Antonio Mugica (born 1974), Venezuelan businessman
- Carlos Mugica (1930–1974), Argentine Roman Catholic priest and activist
- Francisco Múgica (born 1907), Argentine film director, film editor and cinematographer
- René Mugica (1909–1998), Argentine actor, film director and screenwriter

Also:

- Múgica (municipality), in the Mexican state of Michoacán
- Mugica brand of Llama-Gabilondo y Cia SA firearms
