= Lupita Arias =

Mexican politician (born 1981)

Member of the Chamber of Deputies
- Incumbent
- Assumed office 1 September 2024
- Preceded by: Carlos Alberto Manzo Rodríguez
- Constituency: 9th district of Michoacán

Personal details
- Born: Guadalupe Araceli Mendoza Arias; 21 March 1981 (age 45) Tepalcatepec, Michoacán, Mexico
- Party: Independent

Lupita Arias (born Guadalupe Araceli Mendoza Arias, (Note: In this Spanish name, the first or paternal surname is Mendoza and the second or maternal family name is Arias.) 20 March 1981) is a Mexican politician. She came to prominence following the 2024 general election in which she was the only candidate to win a seat in the Chamber of Deputies without the backing of any of the country's registered political parties.

== Early life ==
Lupita Arias was born in Tepalcatepec, in the Tierra Caliente region of the state of Michoacán, on 20 March 1981. Between the ages of 17 and 29, she was married and had three children, but the marriage ended in allegations of spousal abuse and separation. She then worked as a hairdresser and owned a dressmaking shop that employed 25 women. The business failed during the COVID-19 pandemic and, at the invitation of the Ecologist Green Party (PVEM), she decided to enter politics. She was also involved in activism on behalf of crime victims, women, the needy, and stray animals.

== Political career ==
In the mid-term election held on 6 June 2021, she contended for Michoacán's 9th congressional district, based in the city of Uruapan, on the Ecologist Green Party ticket. She placed fifth out a field of nine candidates, losing to Carlos Manzo of the National Regeneration Movement (Morena).

By the time of the 2024 general election, both she and Manzo had broken with their parties. After failing to secure Morena's nomination for the position of municipal president of Uruapan, Manzo founded the Movimiento del sombrero ("Hat Movement") as a local option for presenting independent candidacies for elected office as an alternative to the country's established parties. As its symbol, the movement adopted the sombrero sahuayense, a type of locally produced hat favoured by Manzo. Arias and other local politicians joined the movement.

In the local elections held on 2 June 2024, the movement won two seats in the Congress of Michoacán and Manzo, defeating the incumbent Ignacio Campos Equihua, was elected as Uruapan's first independent mayor.

In the general election held on the same date, Arias once again contended for Michoacán's 9th district. Her campaign proposals included increasing support for women victims of violence (shelters, counselling, legal advice, etc.), building more public schools for special-needs pupils, and the reforestation of former woodlands turned over to agriculture. She won with 35% of the votes cast, defeating the candidates of both the Sigamos Haciendo Historia (34%) and Fuerza y Corazón por México (21%) coalitions and making her the only candidate to win a seat in the Chamber of Deputies without the backing of any of the country's registered political parties.
