= Rafael Melgoza Radillo =

Mexican politician

- Born: 14 July 1946 (age 79); Apatzingán, Michoacán, Mexico
- Occupation: Politician
- Political party: PRD

Rafael Melgoza Radillo (born 14 July 1946) is a Mexican politician affiliated with the Party of the Democratic Revolution (PRD).

He served in the Congress of Michoacán from 1984 to 1986. In the 1988 general election he was elected to the Chamber of Deputies to represent the Michoacán's 13th district for the Popular Socialist Party (PPS).

In 2001–2006 he sat in the Senate for Michoacán as the alternate of Lázaro Cárdenas Batel, who had resigned his seat to contend for the governorship of Michoacán.
