= Alejandro Saldaña Villaseñor =

Mexican politician

- Born: 28 March 1950 (age 76); Michoacán, Mexico
- Occupation: Politician
- Political party: PRI

Alejandro Saldaña Villaseñor (born 28 March 1950) is a Mexican politician affiliated with the Institutional Revolutionary Party (PRI). In the 2003 mid-terms he was elected to the Chamber of Deputies to represent Michoacán's first district during the 59th session of Congress (2003–2006). He was succeeded by Antonio Soto Sánchez. In 2011, Villaseñor ran as the PRI candidate for the head of the municipal council of La Piedad; he lost to Hugo Anaya Ávila, the PAN candidate.

Villaseñor currently serves as head of the Regional Land Registry Office in the city of La Piedad.
