= Nuestra Belleza Michoacán 2011 =

- Date: June 30, 2011
- Presenters: Vielka Valenzuela, Luis de A
- Entertainment: Reily
- Venue: Plaza Morelos, Uruapan, Michoacán
- Broadcaster: Televisa
- Entrants: 8
- Placements: 3
- Winner: Edna Álvarez; Nueva Italia

Nuestra Belleza Michoacán 2011 was a beauty pageant held in the Plaza Morelos of Uruapan, Michoacán, on June 30, 2011. At the conclusion of the final night of competition, Edna Álvarez of Nueva Italia was crowned the winner. Álvarez was crowned by the outgoing Nuestra Belleza Michoacán titleholder, Karla Paulina Gutiérrez. Eight contestants competed for the title.

== Results ==
=== Placements ===
Final results	Contestant
Nuestra Belleza Michoacán 2011	Edna Álvarez
Suplente / 1st Runner-up	Paola Valencia
2nd Runner-up	Alejandra Rivera

== Background music ==
- Reily

== Contestants ==
Hometown	Contestant	Height (m)	Age
Apatzingán	Luz Elena Vega Vega	1.72	18
Los Reyes	Guadalupe Alejandra Rivera Magaña	1.71	20
Morelia	Itzel González Tentori	1.72	22
Nueva Italia	Edna Paola Álvarez Madriz	1.74	18
Tuzantla	Brisa Ireri Arroyo	1.70	23
Tepalcatepec	Rosa María Valencia Partida	1.70	23
Uruapan	Habbibi Teresita Grayeb Moreno	1.78	23
Uruapan	Claudia Patricia Curiel Cervantes	1.78	21
