= Julio César Godoy Toscano =

Mexican businessman and politician (born 1965)

- Born: February 25, 1965 (age 61); Lázaro Cárdenas, Michoacán, Mexico
- Known for: Party of the Democratic Revolution politician and former legislator. Charged with links to organized crime (fugitive).

Julio César Godoy Toscano (born 1965 in Lázaro Cárdenas, Michoacán) is a Mexican businessman, politician and a former member of the leftist Party of the Democratic Revolution (PRD). He is half-brother of Leonel Godoy Rangel, former governor of the state of Michoacán. Godoy has served as Mayor of the municipality of Lázaro Cárdenas and was elected in 2009 to the Chamber of Deputies to represent Michoacán's first district; however, before being sworn in he was accused with ties with organized crime and money laundering. He evaded a 2009 arrest warrant by sneaking into his own swearing-in ceremony in order to obtain parliamentary immunity. Godoy was later disavowed by the party and stripped of his office when an audio recording was released of him apparently speaking with La Familia drug cartel leader. He remains a fugitive.

== Criminal charges ==
Godoy Toscano was charged in July 2009 with ties with La Familia Michoacana, a quasi-religious drug cartel based in the state of Michoacán that smuggle methamphetamine and marijuana to the U.S. The Federal Police alleged that Godoy Toscano was in charge of ensuring protection for La Familia drug cartel. Godoy avoided arrest and he remained a fugitive for 15 months.

=== Immunity from prosecution ===
In a bizarre legal development that took place on September 23, 2010, he evaded police checkpoints installed to prevent his entry to the Chamber of Deputies after a judge granted him an injunction, allowing him to be sworn in despite the 2009 arrest warrant and acquired parliamentary immunity (Spanish: fuero), as all Mexican elected officials do while in office. A spokesman for the federal Attorney General's Office said the injunction was granted because the judge felt Godoy's political rights had been violated by not letting him take his oath of office, and had nothing to do with the actual criminal case. However, the arrest warrant against Godoy Toscano remains valid.

His position as a deputy gave him immunity, but the federal Attorney General's Office pressured legislators for his impeachment. One of the reasons the immunity exists is to shield sitting legislators from judicial harassment by opposition parties. It can be taken away only with a majority vote by legislators – the situation in which Godoy found himself.

On October 14, 2010, the Federal Police "leaked" to the media one of several audio recordings of a conversation between Godoy and drug lord Servando Gómez Martínez. In the conversation – reportedly dating from July 12, 2009 – mutual favors and recommendations are shared between the two. In the conversation, drug lord Gómez Martínez asks Godoy to get the governor to intercede at the federal level "so the police will stop interfering". Five days after the leak of this recording, on October 19, Godoy resigned his membership in the PRD in order to "reduce the negative exposure" to his political party, while his peers at the PRD demand he faces the criminal charges, whether impeached or not. In October 2010 he had an additional charge for money laundering, and of having received 25 million pesos (about 2 million US$) from drug lord Servando Gómez Martínez.

=== Impeachment ===
On 14 December 2010, his fellow legislators impeached Godoy and revoked his immunity after voting 384–2, with 21 abstentions, though he could resume his legislative duties if exonerated of the charges. His replacement is Israel Madrigal Ceja.

Godoy is a fugitive again and is currently charged by the Attorney General of Mexico with ties with organized crime and money laundering, and he is expected to defend his own case in court if/when arrested. The Attorney General said on December 17, 2010, that he was calling on Interpol to help authorities capture Godoy.
