= Socorro Quintana León =

Mexican politician

- Born: 23 December 1962 (age 63); Uruapan, Michoacán, Mexico
- Occupation: Politician
- Political party: PRI

Socorro de la Luz Quintana León (born 23 December 1962) is a Mexican politician affiliated with the Institutional Revolutionary Party (PRI). In the 2012 general election she was elected to the Chamber of Deputies to represent Michoacán's ninth district during the 62nd session of Congress.
