= List of storms named Nora =

The name Nora has been used for 18 tropical cyclones worldwide. Seven were in the East Pacific Ocean, ten in the West Pacific Ocean, and one in the Australian region. Nora has also been used for one European windstorm.

In the East Pacific:

- Tropical Storm Nora (1985) – not a threat to land.
- Hurricane Nora (1991) – a Category 2 hurricane that dissipated before making landfall.
- Hurricane Nora (1997) – a powerful Category 4 hurricane which made landfall in Baja California, later moving into the Lower Colorado River Valley.
- Hurricane Nora (2003) – a Category 2 hurricane that became the strongest storm of the season; made landfall as a tropical depression.
- Tropical Storm Nora (2009) – no threat to land.
- Tropical Storm Nora (2015) – approached Hawaii but dissipated before landfall.
- Hurricane Nora (2021) – a large Category 1 hurricane that made landfall in the Mexican state of Jalisco.

In the West Pacific:

- Typhoon Nora (1945) – late-season typhoon which threatened the Philippines but eventually recurved at sea.
- Typhoon Nora (1951) (T5112) – powerful typhoon which made landfall in northern Luzon, Hainan and northern Vietnam.
- Typhoon Nora (1955) (T5525) – relatively strong typhoon which brushed the coast of Japan.
- Tropical Storm Nora (1959) (T5913, 26W) – a tropical storm that made landfall in China.
- Typhoon Nora (1962) (T6209, 46W) – struck the Korean Peninsula and Hokkaido, causing the deaths of 15 people.
- Tropical Storm Nora (1964) (T6433, 49W, Moning) – weak tropical storm which caused a shipwreck in the Philippines, presumably killing 18.
- Typhoon Nora (1967) (T6721, 24W, Sisang) – minimal typhoon which affected the Ryukyu Islands, Taiwan and East China.
- Tropical Storm Nora (1970) (T7023, 25W) – relatively strong tropical storm that brushed the coasts of southern Vietnam, Cambodia and Thailand, with its remnants contributing to the formation of the 1970 Bhola cyclone.
- Typhoon Nora (1973) (T7315, 17W, Luming) – one of the most intense tropical cyclones ever recorded; impacted the Philippines, Taiwan and China at a weaker strength, claiming at least 40 lives.
- Severe Tropical Storm Nora (1976) (T7624, 25W, Aring) – struck the central and eastern regions of the Philippines.

In the Australian region:

- Cyclone Nora (2018) – made landfall in Far North Queensland, causing more than US$25 million in damages and economic losses.

In Europe:

- Storm Eunice (2022) – known as Storm Nora in Denmark.

== See also ==
- Cyclone Mora (2017) – a North Indian Ocean tropical cyclone with a similar name.
