= Juan Carlos Velasco Pérez =

Mexican politician

- Born: 3 February 1952 (age 74); Michoacán, Mexico
- Occupation: Politician
- Political party: PRI

Juan Carlos Velasco Pérez (born 3 August 1952) is a Mexican politician from the Institutional Revolutionary Party (PRI).

He has been elected to the Chamber of Deputies on two occasions: in the 1985 mid-terms, to represent Michoacán's ninth district during the 53rd Congress, and in the 2006 general election as a plurinominal deputy for the fifth electoral region during the 60th Congress
