= Nueva Italia, Michoacán =

Nueva Italia de Ruiz
- City
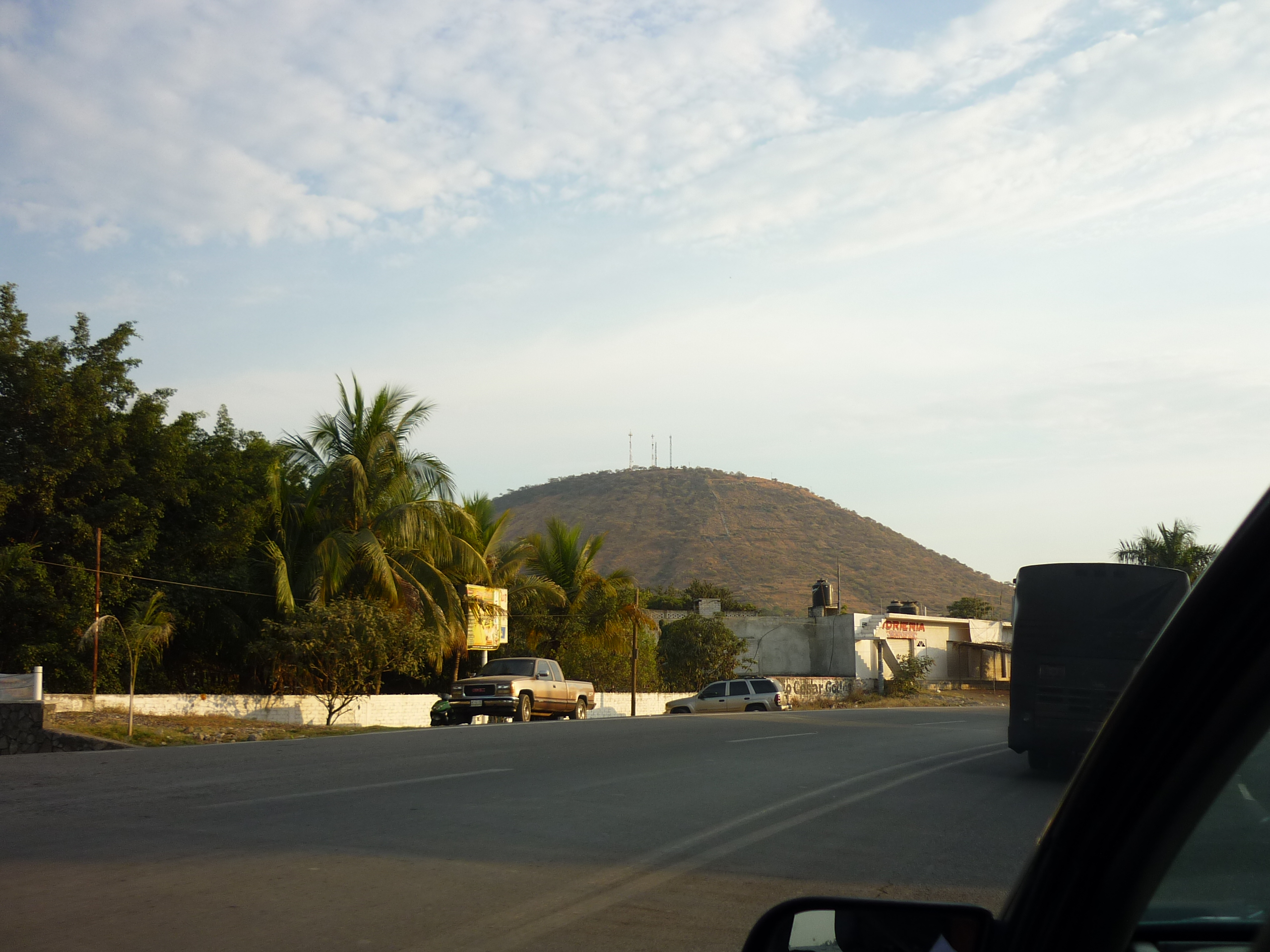

- Location within Michoacán Location within Mexico
- Coordinates: 19°01′10″N 102°06′32″W
- Country: Mexico
- State: Michoacán
- Municipality: Múgica
- Foundation: November 19, 1909

Government
  - Mayor: Armando Medina
  - Founder: Dante Cusi
- Elevation: 420 m (1,380 ft)

Population (2010)
  - Total: 32,467
- Time zone: UTC-6 (Central Standard Time)
- Zip code: 61760

Nueva Italia (New Italy) is a city in the Mexican state of Michoacán. It is located in the Tierra Caliente Michoacana.

== History ==
The town was founded in 1909 by Italian Dante Cusi to become the leading producer of cotton, rice, melon and maize in all of Mexico. It introduced waters of the Rio del Marquez to the arid region to make the soil fertile. In addition is the Rio Cupatitzio, through which channels and traps forms one of the largest irrigation complexes in Latin America. Lastly, the railroad allowed the opportunity for children from Italy to come. Subsequently, there was a ranch built, but is now in ruins.

On February 3, 1942, New Italy separated from the municipality of Parácuaro to form the new municipality of Zaragoza. In 1969 the municipality changed its name to "Mugica".

Because of this the population of Nueva Italia increased rapidly, which allowed a subsequent boom in work around Michoacán, mainly in Parácuaro and Apatzingán. People also came throughout Mexico, with significant numbers from Sinaloa and Guerrero in particular.

Nueva Italia has the largest ejido of all Mexico with more than 22,000 hectares.

=== Physical environment ===
Nueva Italia is located in the center of the state of Michoacán, in the coordinates 19° 01' latitude and 102° 06'W, approximately 420 meters above sea level. Bordered on the north by the town of Lombardía, lying west of the town of La Huacana, east of the town of Parácuaro and the city of Apatzingán. To the south lie El Letrero and Gambara villages in the same municipality.

OROGRAPHY: Their relief is the Depresión del Balsas and the Cerro Nueva Italia.

CLIMATE: Temperate, with rain in summer. Its annual temperatures range from 17 °C to 44 °C.

=== Demographics ===
According to the 15 census, the city's population was 32,149. The population fell in 2000 to 30,345 and in 2005 to 28,343, showing a loss of over 3,800 people over that decade.

The 2010 Census showed 32,467, an increase of 4,124 inhabitants.

=== Cuisine ===
Its cuisine comprises morisqueta, enchiladas, soups, mole, perch, and roast. The latter was brought to this land in 1985 by Raul Sandoval Mejia. Roasted goat has been a favorite among Nueva Italia residents for 4 decades. Snacks include huchepos, corundas and many others.

=== Economy ===
Neoitalense economy constitute the agriculture and is planted primarily corn, lemon, cucumber, mango, etc., The livestock with cattle, pig of poultry and hives and trade and traded fruit and vegetables among others.

=== Services ===
It has several shopping centers, with Elektra Bodega Aurrerá, Bancomer, Banamex, Banco Azteca in terms of known centers are concerned, with service of taxi, bus, cable telephony as with Telmex Telcel and Movistar, 2 municipal markets as well of 2 sports halls and a unit with a small stadium with a capacity for 1,450 people.

== Sister cities ==
- (Paraguay) Nueva Italia
- (Italy) Corvione di Gámbara
- (Cuba) Colón
