= Uriel López Paredes =

Mexican politician

- Born: 25 December 1959 (age 66); Michoacán, Mexico
- Occupation: Politician
- Political party: PRD (1998–2014)

Uriel López Paredes (born 25 December 1959) is a Mexican politician formerly from the Party of the Democratic Revolution (PRD). In the 2009 mid-terms he was elected to the Chamber of Deputies for the PRD to represent Michoacán's ninth district during the 61st session of Congress.

He resigned from the PRD in 2014.
