= Antonio Soto Sánchez =

Mexican politician (born 1964)

- Born: 12 June 1964 (age 62); Tumbiscatío, Michoacán, Mexico
- Occupation: Politician
- Political party: PRD

Antonio Soto Sánchez (born 12 June 1964) is a Mexican politician affiliated with the Party of the Democratic Revolution (PRD).

In the 1997 mid-terms he was elected to the Chamber of Deputies to represent Michoacán's 13th district during the 57th Congress.

In the 2000 general election he was elected to the Senate for the state of Michoacán, where he served from 2000 to 2006 during the 58th and 59th Congresses.

In the 2006 general election he was elected to the Chamber of Deputies to represent Michoacán's first district during the 60th Congress.
