= Morisqueta =

Mexican dish

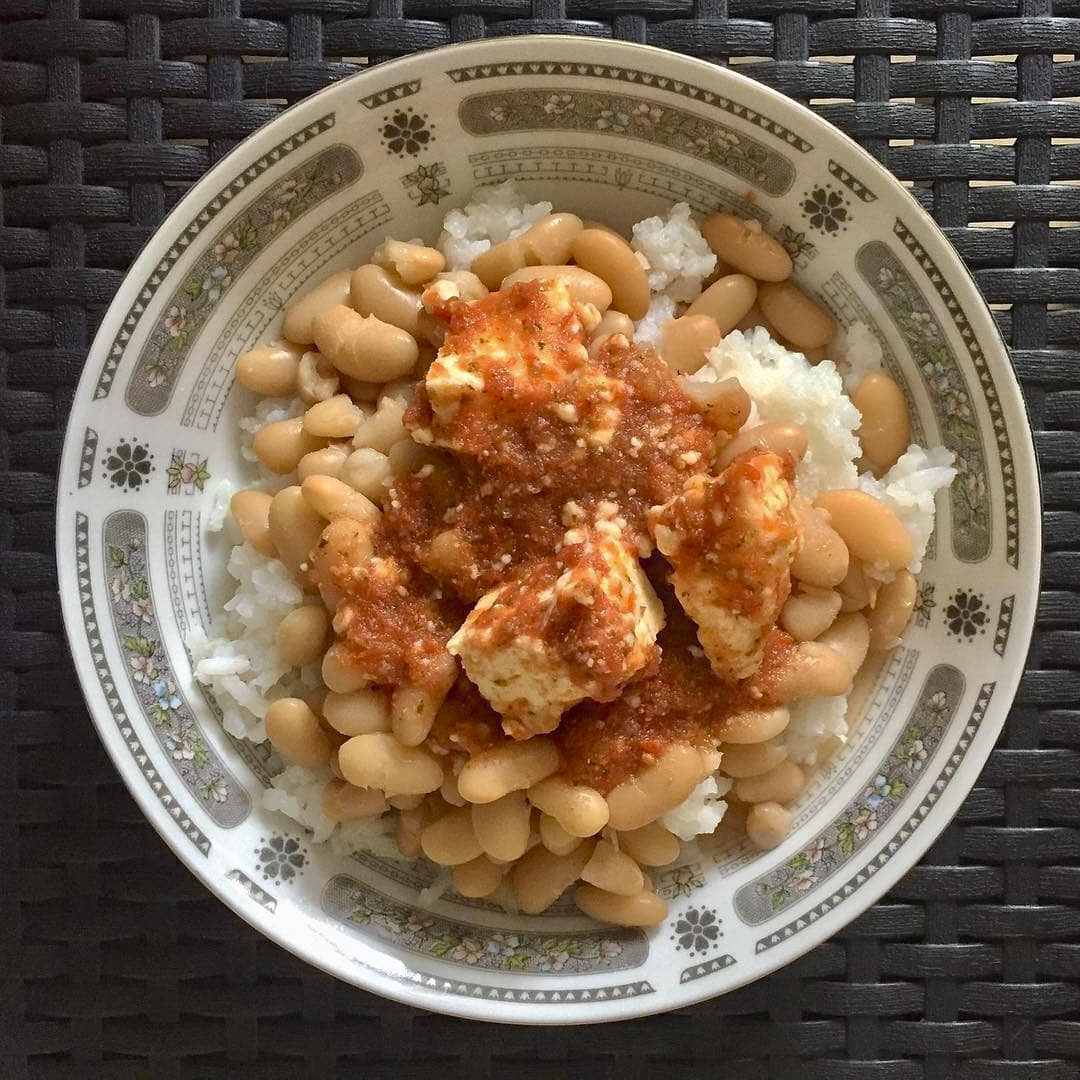
- A plate of morisqueta
- Type: Rice dish
- Course: Side
- Place of origin: Apatzingán, Parácuaro, and Nueva Italia, Michoacán
- Region or state: Michoacán, Costa Chica (Guerrero)
- Main ingredients: White rice, beans, tomato sauce, and cheese

Morisqueta is a Mexican dish native to Apatzingán, Michoacán.

The dish consists of cooked white rice, combined with pinto beans, and served with a sauce of tomato, onion and garlic. Cooked and served with the sauce, traditionally may be served with cubes of adobera, a kind of cheese, ranchero or fresh cheese, which melts as you eat. Also, pork or beef may be served with the same staple sauce. Espinaca is traditionally the cut of pork that is served with this dish in a spicy green, Chile verde, sauce. It is often accompanied with totopos, tostadas, or fried taquitos. In south-western Mexico, it is customary to serve morisqueta with aporreadillo (shredded, dried meat, fried with egg, cooked in a guajillo sauce with cumin). Morisqueta has a strong resemblance to Moros y Cristianos, since they use the same base of rice and beans.

Morisquetas are a common food in the Tierra Caliente region of Michoacán

Another rice dish, consisting of white rice, onion and garlic, but no beans, meat or cheese, is also called morisqueta. It is sometimes served with cilantro and Serrano pepper.
