= Carlos Hernán Silva Valdés =

Mexican politician

- Born: 28 January 1954 (age 72); Uruapan, Michoacán, Mexico
- Occupation: Politician
- Political party: PRD

Carlos Hernán Silva Valdés (born 28 January 1954) is a Mexican politician affiliated with the Party of the Democratic Revolution (PRD). In the 2003 mid-terms he was elected to the Chamber of Deputies to represent Michoacán's ninth district during the 59th session of Congress.
