= Fausto Mendoza Maldonado =

Mexican politician

- Born: 7 June 1948 (age 78); Michoacán, Mexico
- Occupation: Politician
- Political party: PRD

Fausto Fluvio Mendoza Maldonado (born 7 June 1948) is a Mexican politician affiliated with the Party of the Democratic Revolution (PRD). In the 2006 general election he was elected to the Chamber of Deputies to represent Michoacán's ninth district during the 60th session of Congress.
