= El Letrero =

- El Letrero
- State: Michoacán Michoacán de Ocampo
- Municipality: Múgica

Population (2020)
  - Total: 2,030
- Time zone: Central Time (UTC -6)
- Postal code: 61790
- Area code: 425
- Website: www.mugicamich.gob.mx

El Letrero is a locality in Mexico, specifically within the municipality of Múgica in the state of Michoacán. It is positioned in the area referred to as Tierra Caliente Mexicana.

== Geography ==
The locality is positioned at the geographic coordinates 18°57′44.000″N 102°06′35.000″W, with an altitude of 302 m a.s.l. It is approximately 4.9 kilometers northeast of the municipal seat, Nueva Italia de Ruiz.

=== Orography ===
Its terrain consists entirely of the Balsas Depression.

=== Climate ===
The climate is dry steppe with summer rains. It has an annual precipitation of 245 mm and temperatures range from 22 °C to 37 °C.

== Demographics ==
According to data from the XIV General Population and Housing Census conducted by the National Institute of Statistics and Geography in 2020, El Letrero has a population of 2,030 inhabitants, of which 985 are women and 1,045 are men, representing an increase of 171 inhabitants compared to the 2010 Census.

=== Population of El Letrero 1930-2020 ===
Censuses

Year	Pop.	±%
1930	58	—
1940	257	+343.1%
1950	317	+23.3%
1960	640	+101.9%
1970	949	+48.3%

Year	Pop.	±%
1980	1,159	+22.1%
1990	1,788	+54.3%
2000	1,825	+2.1%
2010	1,859	+1.9%
2020	2,030	+9.2%

Source: www.inegi.org.mx

== Festivities ==
- 15 and 16 September - Independence Day Anniversary
- 16 November - Ejido Foundation Anniversary
- 20 November - Mexican Revolution Anniversary

== See also ==
- Nueva Italia
