= Rafael García Tinajero =

Mexican politician

- Born: 19 February 1960 (age 66); Michoacán, Mexico
- Education: UMSNH
- Occupation: Politician
- Political party: PRD

Rafael García Tinajero Pérez (born 19 February 1960) is a Mexican politician affiliated to the Party of the Democratic Revolution. As of 2014 he served as Deputy of the LIX Legislature of the Mexican Congress representing Michoacán.
