= La Huacana, La Huacana =

La Huacana
- City
- Location of La Huacana in Mexico
- Coordinates: 18°57′45″N 101°48′25″W
- Country: Mexico
- State: Michoacán
- Established: 1927; 99 years ago
- Elevation: 480 m (1,570 ft)

Population (2015)
  - Total: 9,374
- Time zone: UTC-6 (CST)

La Huacana is the municipal seat of La Huacana Municipality in Michoacán, Mexico. In 2010 it also was the most populous locality in the municipality. It is located 161 kilometers (100 mi) from the state capital Morelia.

The name comes from the purepecha which means "place of dresses".

== History ==
During the wars before the Spaniards arrived, this place was conquered by the Tarascan state, by the successors of Tariacuri: Hiquingare, Tangaxuan and Hirepan. These rulers, in order to ensure the payment of tribute, appointed Cupauxanti as chieftain. In the 16th century, with the arrival of the Spaniards, shortly after the conquest of Apatzingan, La Huacana became an encomienda under Juan Pantoja. In 1789 Jose Maria Morelos was the curate of the parish of Tamacuaro de la Aguacana.

== Demographics ==
In 2010, the town of La Huacana had a population of 9,395.

== Economy ==
La Huacana is the centre of the municipality's principal economic activities, which are agriculture, cattle raising and fishing.

== Attractions ==
Some of the attractions of La Huacana are the main square, the temple of San Nicolas de Tolentino, the volcano "el jorullo", the natural spa "la presita", the spas "hot water" and "the waterfall".
