= Tingambato =

Municipality in Michoacán, Mexico

Coordinates: 19°30′N 101°51′W

- Municipality
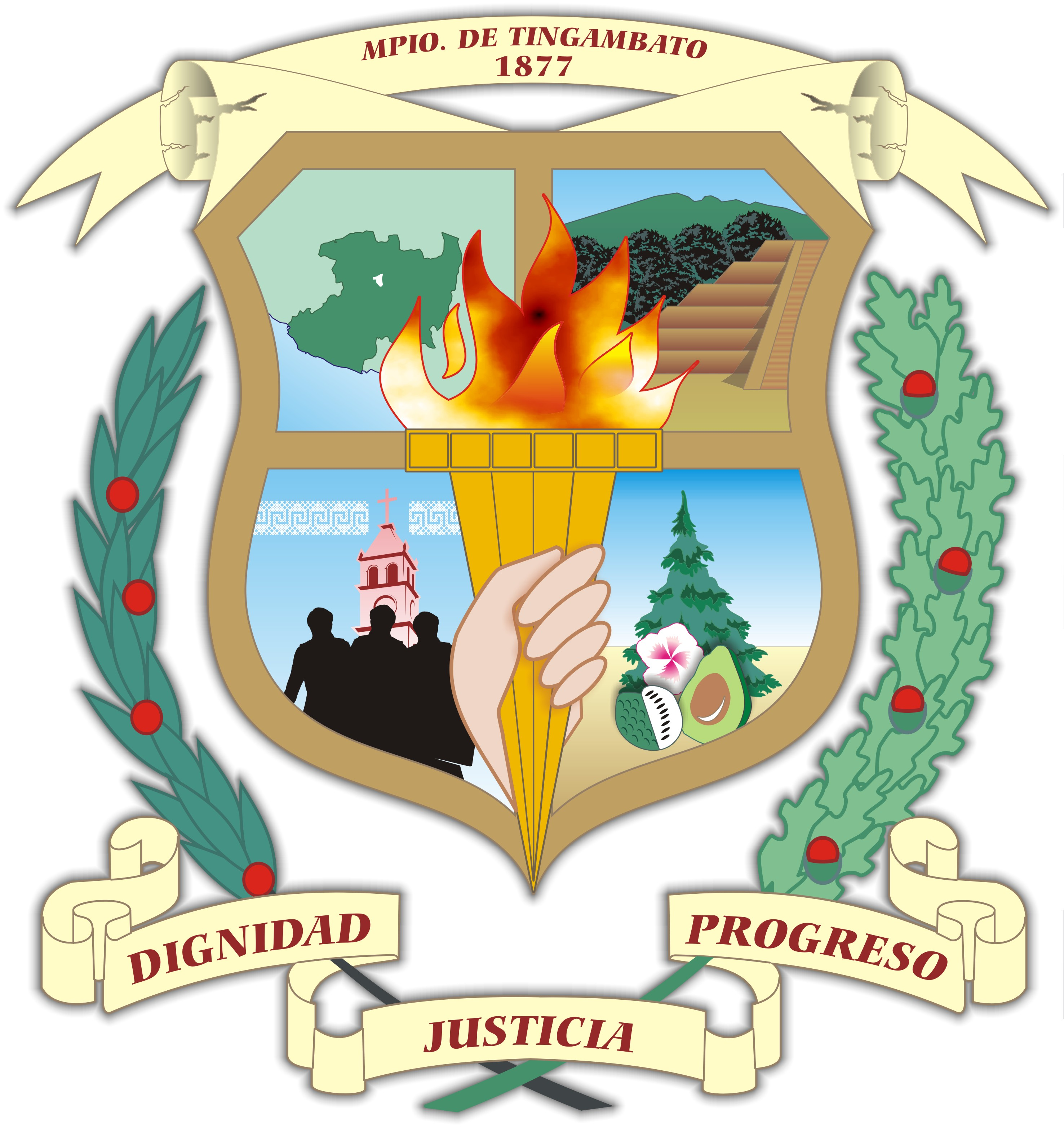
- Coat of arms

- Location in Mexico Tingambato (Mexico)
- Country: Mexico
- State: Michoacán
- Demonym: (in Spanish)
- Time zone: UTC−6 (CST)

Tingambato is a municipality in the Mexican state of Michoacán. Its municipal seat is the city of the same name. The municipality has an area of 188.77 square kilometres (0.32% of the surface of the state) and is bordered by the north by the municipalities of Nahuatzén and Erongarícuaro, to the east by Pátzcuaro and Salvador Escalante, to the south by Ziracuaretiro, and to the west by Uruapan. The municipality had a population of 17,630 inhabitants according to the 2015 census. Its municipal seat is the city of the same name.

== Name ==
The word Tingambato is of Chichimeca origin and it means "Hill of mild climate".

== History ==
The story of the region can be traced 1,300 years to the arrival of the Purépecha monarchy to the region.

The site had two period of construction. In AD 450-600 ceremonial buildings with Teotihuacan-style taluds were built. In the second stage (AD 600-950) a ball court was also built in the Teotihuacan style. One tomb contains 6 men who provide evidence of dental mutilation.

== Gallery ==

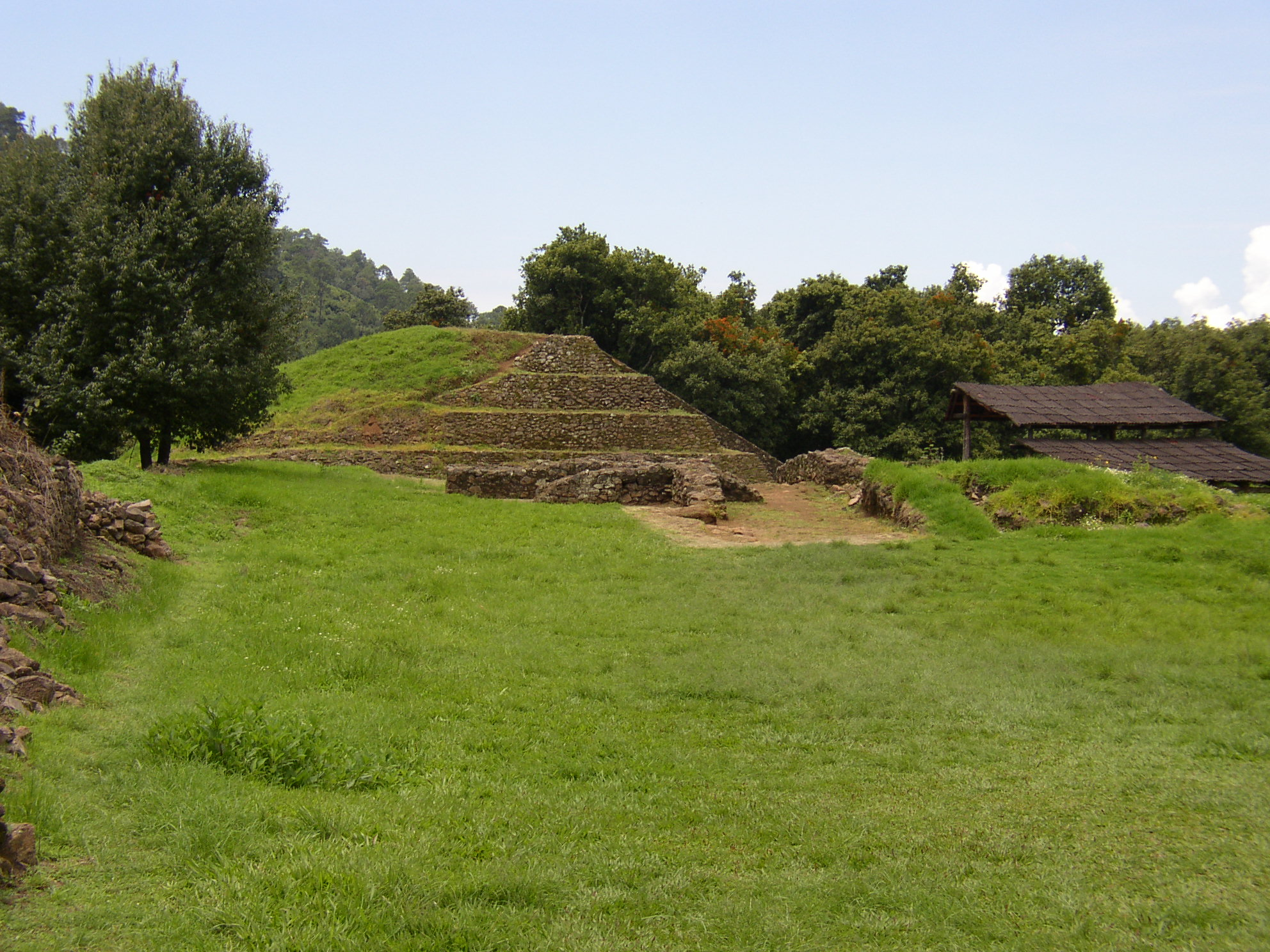
