= Leonel Godoy Rangel =

Mexican politician

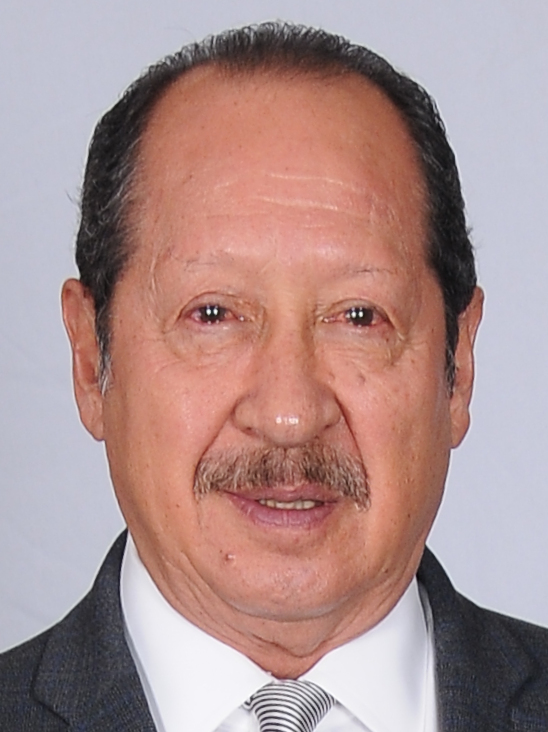

Member of the Chamber of Deputies
- Incumbent
- Assumed office September 1, 2021

Governor of Michoacán
- In office February 15, 2008 – February 14, 2012
- Preceded by: Lázaro Cárdenas Batel
- Succeeded by: Fausto Vallejo

Personal details
- Born: June 6, 1950 (age 76) Lázaro Cárdenas, Michoacán
- Party: National Regeneration Movement
- Other political affiliations: Party of the Democratic Revolution; Institutional Revolutionary Party
- Education: Universidad Michoacana de San Nicolás de Hidalgo; National Autonomous University of Mexico

Leonel Godoy Rangel (born June 5, 1950) is a Mexican lawyer, politician, and former Governor of Michoacán. He is a former president of the Party of the Democratic Revolution (PRD). Godoy hails from the coastal region of Michoacán. He serves as deputy for the National Regeneration Movement.

== Political career ==
Leonel Godoy was born in Lázaro Cárdenas, Michoacán, in 1950. He began his political career in his native state serving in various positions during the governorship of Cuauhtémoc Cárdenas. He served in the Chamber of Deputies as a plurinominal deputy from 1994 to 1997. In 1997 he joined the cabinet of Cuauhtémoc Cárdenas's government in the Federal District. Godoy has also served in the cabinets of Andrés Manuel López Obrador (Federal District) and Lázaro Cárdenas Batel (Michoacán). Godoy was elected to the Senate as a joint PRD-PT-CD candidate, representing the state of Michoacán, in the federal election held on July 2, 2006. In June 2007 he was elected by the Party of the Democratic Revolution (PRD) as candidate for governor of Michoacán for the November 11 state election. According to the Preliminary Results Program (PREP) he won the election with nearly 38% of the votes and assumed office in February 2008.

Godoy was the second governor elected from the PRD. He proposed a new scheme of departments for youth, Native People, women, migrants and other vulernable social sectors.

In the 2021 mid-terms he was elected to the Chamber of Deputies to represent Michoacán's first district for the National Regeneration Movement (Morena). Three years later, he won re-election to the same seat in the 2024 general election.

Political offices
| Preceded by Lázaro Cárdenas Batel | Governor of Michoacán; 2008–2012 | Succeeded by Fausto Vallejo |
Party political offices
| Preceded by Rosario Robles | President of the Party of the Democratic Revolution; 2003–2005 | Succeeded by Leonel Cota |
