= Mujica =

Mujica (in Basque Muxika) is a Basque surname. Variations include Mujíca, Mújica, Mújico, Mujika, Mugica, Múgica, Mugika, Moxica and Mojica.

Notable people with the name include:

- Andreína Mujica (born 1970), Venezuelan journalist and photographer
- Aylín Mújica (born 1974), Cuban actress and model
- Edward Mujica (born 1984), Venezuelan baseball pitcher
- José Mujica (1935–2025), Uruguayan former guerrilla, statesman and president of Uruguay (2010–2015)
- José Mujica (baseball) (born 1996), Venezuelan baseball player
- Manuel Mujica Lainez (1910–1984), Argentine fiction writer and art critic
- Pedro Mujica Carassa, early 20th century Peruvian politician
- José Mojica (1896–1974), Mexican Franciscan friar, tenor and film actor
- José Mojica Marins, a.k.a. "Coffin Joe" (1936–2020), Brazilian filmmaker, actor and screenwriter
- Adrián de Moxica (1453–1499), Spanish nobleman and explorer of Basque decent
- Carlos Mugica (1930–1974), Argentine Roman Catholic priest and activist
- Francisco Múgica (1907–1985), Argentine film director, film editor and cinematographer
- René Mugica (1909–1998), Argentine actor, film director and screenwriter
- Haritz Mújika (born 1981), Spanish footballer
- Jokin Mújika (born 1962), Spanish cyclist
- Juan María Mujika (1963–2004), Spanish footballer

== See also ==
- General Francisco Mujica International Airport, Morelia, Michoacán, Mexico
- Mugica, a brand of Llama-Gabilondo y Cia SA firearms
- Muxika, a town and municipality in Biscay, Spain
- Ave Mujica, a Japanese band
