= Lázaro Cárdenas Batel =

Mexican politician

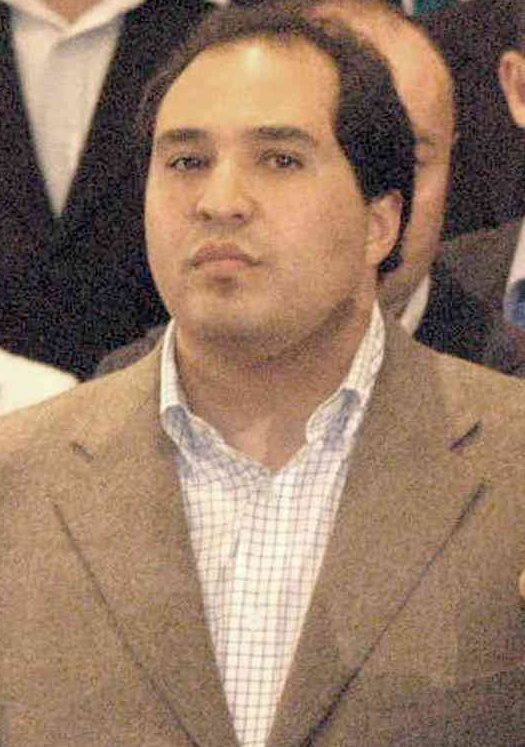

Chief of Staff to the President of México
- Incumbent
- Assumed office 1 October 2024
- President: Claudia Sheinbaum
- Preceded by: Alfonso Romo

Governor of Michoacán
- In office 15 February 2002 – 14 February 2008
- Preceded by: Víctor Manuel Tinoco Rubí
- Succeeded by: Leonel Godoy Rangel

Personal details
- Born: 2 April 1964 (age 62) Jiquilpan, Michoacán, Mexico
- Party: Morena (2017–present)
- Other political affiliations: Institutional Revolutionary (1982–1987); Democratic Revolution (1989–2014)
- Spouse: Mayra Coffigny

Lázaro Cárdenas Batel (born 2 April 1964) is a Mexican politician. He served as governor of Michoacán from 2002 to 2008, representing the Party of the Democratic Revolution (PRD). Prior to his election to that office in 2001, he had represented his home state in both the federal Chamber of Deputies and the Senate.

Cárdenas Batel is a member of a distinguished political family: his grandfather, Lázaro Cárdenas del Río, served as President of Mexico from 1934 to 1940, and his father, Cuauhtémoc Cárdenas, was a presidential candidate on three occasions and was the first democratically elected Head of Government of the Federal District (Mexico City). Both father and grandfather also served as governors of Michoacán.

Some PRD members criticized Cárdenas Batel for his lack of support for Andrés Manuel López Obrador during the 2006 presidential campaign; some even asked him to leave the party. On the night of election, according to The Wall Street Journal, Cárdenas Batel accepted a call from López Obrador's opponent and eventual winner, Felipe Calderón. He was succeeded in the position as Michoacán governor by Leonel Godoy in February 2008.

Cárdenas Batel would later serve as the Chief Adviser to the President of Mexico after López Obrador became President of Mexico.

On 11 July 2024, president Claudia Sheinbaum announced that Cárdenas Batel would be serving as her chief of staff when her administration began.

Cárdenas Batel is a member of the Inter-American Dialogue, but is currently on leave. He is expected to remain on leave until the end of his term.

== Notes ==
Political offices
Preceded by Víctor Manuel; Tinoco Rubí	Governor of Michoacán; 2002–2008	Succeeded by Leonel Godoy Rangel
