= Ignacio Campos Equihua =

Mexican politician, born 1973

Ignacio Benjamín Campos Equihua (Note: In this Spanish name, the first or paternal surname is Campos and the second or maternal family name is Equihua.) (born 12 May 1973) is a Mexican teacher and politician. Currently a member of the National Regeneration Movement (Morena), he was previously affiliated with the Party of the Democratic Revolution (PRD).

In the 2018 general election, he was elected to the Chamber of Deputies to represent Michoacán's 9th district for Morena during the 64th session of Congress.

Following his term in Congress, he was elected to serve as the municipal president of Uruapan, Michoacán, for 2021–2024. He sought re-election in 2024 but was defeated by the independent candidate Carlos Manzo Rodríguez by a margin of 66% to 19%.
