= Nuevo San Juan Parangaricutiro =

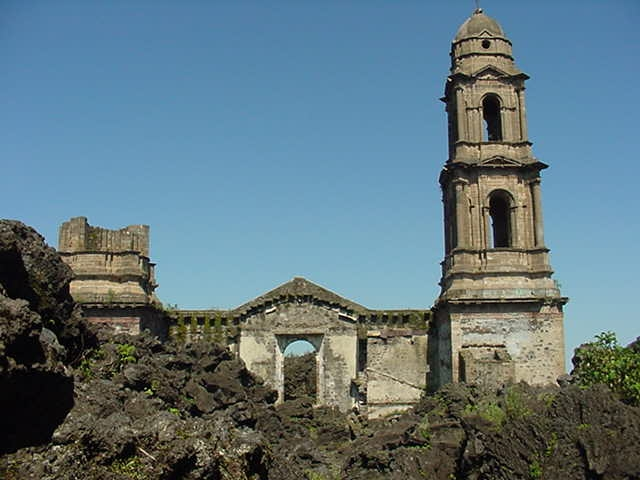
- Church ruins of the original San Juan Parangaricutiro

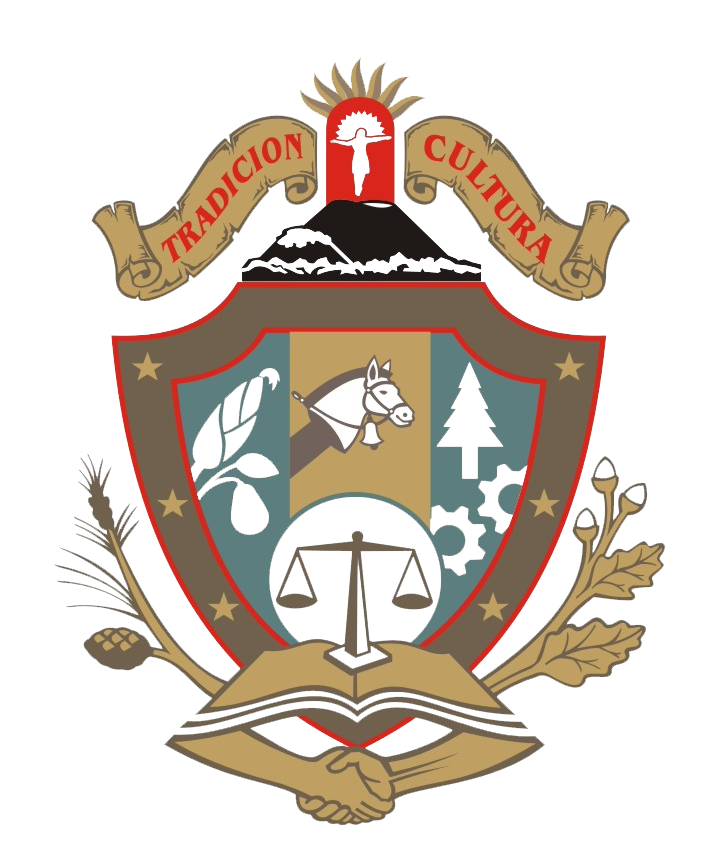
- Coat of arms
- Motto: El pueblo que se negó a morir
- Location within Mexico
- Coordinates: 19°25′00″N 102°07′46″W
- Country: Mexico
- State: Michoacán
- Municipality: Nuevo Parangaricutiro
- Established: 12 May 1944

Population (2020)
  - Total: 16 745
- Postal code: 61410

Nuevo San Juan Parangaricutiro is a small village in the Mexican state of Michoacán near the Parícutin volcano. It is the municipal seat for the municipality of Nuevo Parangaricutiro. The city is called Nuevo (Spanish for "new") because the original San Juan Parangaricutiro was destroyed during the formation of the Parícutin volcano in 1943. Along with the village of Parícutin, San Juan Parangaricutiro was buried beneath ash and lava. The top of the church of old San Juan Parangaricutiro still protrudes from the volcanic deposits.

Nuevo San Juan Parangaricutiro is about 8 kilometers (5.0 mi) west of Uruapan and 16 kilometers (9.9 mi) east of the peak of Parícutin in central Michoacán. The village’s postal code is 60490.

Like many places in Mexico, it is locally known by several unofficial names: "San Juan", "Nuevo San Juan", and "Parangaricutiro" are all variations. San Juan Parangaricutiro is also famously known as Parangaricutirimícuaro, the longest toponym in Mexico. Some believe that the name is an urban legend and does not exist. It is the object of the folklore of many fictitious fables. The word itself is a tongue-twister and is also used in longer tongue-twisters that include nonsense words similar to Parangaricutirimícuaro, for example: "El pueblo de Parangaricutirimícuaro se va a desparangaricutirimicuarizar. Quien logre desparangaricutirimicuarizarlo buen desparangaricutirimicuarizador será."

== Geography ==
Nuevo San Juan Parangaricutiro is about 8 kilometers (5.0 mi) west of Uruapan and 16 kilometers (9.9 mi) east of the peak of Parícutin in central Michoacán. The village’s postal code is 60490.

=== Community forest ===
Nuevo San Juan is home to the Purépecha indigenous group which maintains communal lands covering 18,138 hectares (44,820 acres), including around 12,000 hectares (30,000 acres) of temperate forest. In the 1970s, the group took control of the forest enterprises and by 1997 the community obtained their forest management certification from the Forest Stewardship Council. In 2004, the community won the Equator Initiative prize, part of the United Nations Development Programme, which recognizes outstanding indigenous community efforts to reduce poverty through the conservation and sustainable use of biodiversity. Annually, they produce around 65,000 cubic meters (2.3 million cubic feet) of timber and offer a range of products including resins, construction lumber, finish lumber, pallets, fibers for paper pulp, furniture, and cabins.
