= Churumuco =

- Town
- Churumuco de Morelos
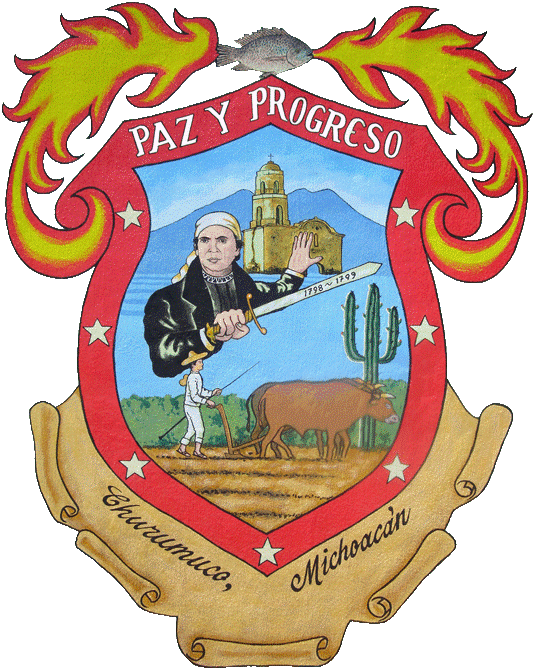
- Coat of arms

- Location within Michoacán Location within Mexico
- Coordinates: 18°37′00″N 101°38′00″W
- Country: Mexico
- State: Michoacán
- Municipality: Churumuco

Government
  - Mayor: Gildardo Barrera Estrada (PRI-PVEM)

Area
  - Total: 1,119.44 km^{2} (432.22 sq mi)
  - Water: 8,175 ha (20,200 acres)
- Elevation: 200 m (660 ft)

Population (2010)
  - Total: 14,366
  - Density: 12.833/km^{2} (33.238/sq mi)
- Time zone: UTC-6 (Zona Centro)
- Postal code: 61880 -
- Area code: 425

Churumuco is a municipality located in the southeastern part of the Mexican state of Michoacán. The municipality has an area of 1,119.44 square kilometres (1.90% of the surface of the state) and is bordered to the north by the municipality of La Huacana, to the northeast by Turicato, to the south by the state of Guerrero, to the southwest by Huetamo, and to the west by Arteaga. The municipality had a population of 13,801 inhabitants according to the 2005 census.

Its municipal seat is the city of Churumuco de Morelos, which is named after José María Morelos, a priest and revolutionary rebel leader who led the Mexican War of Independence movement. Morelos served as priest of the town before taking arms.

Churumuco (from the Purépecha word Churumekua) means "Bird's beak".
