= Múgica Municipality =

Múgica
- Municipality
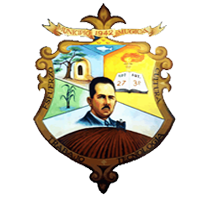
- Coat of arms

- Location in Mexico
- Coordinates: 19°1′10″N 102°6′32″W
- Country: Mexico
- State: Michoacán
- Municipal seat: Nueva Italia
- Established: 12 February 1942

Area
  - Total: 378.18 km^{2} (146.02 sq mi)

Population (2010)
  - Total: 44,963
  - Density: 118.89/km^{2} (307.93/sq mi)

Múgica is a municipality in the Mexican state of Michoacán. The municipal seat lies at Nueva Italia. The municipality was originally created on February 12, 1942 as the municipality of Zaragoza then changed to the current name on December 9, 1969.

== Localities ==
The municipality has 52 localities. The largest are:

Locality	Population
Total	44,963
Nueva Italia de Ruiz	32,467
Gámbara	3,017
El Ceñidor	2,235
El Letrero	1,859
Cuatro Caminos	1,194
Estación Nueva Italia	814
