= Parácuaro =

Coordinates: 19°08′48″N 102°13′10″W

- Municipality
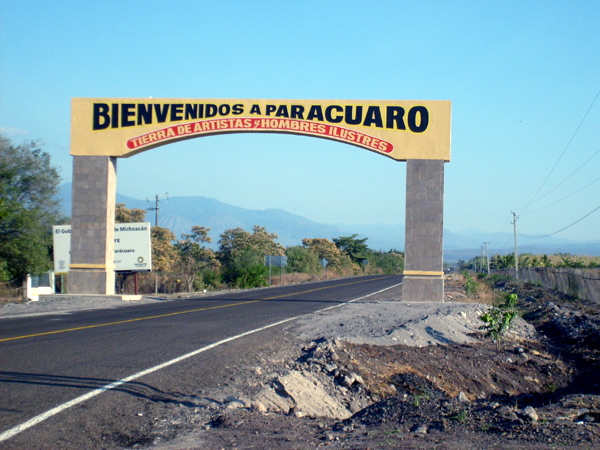
- Welcome sign

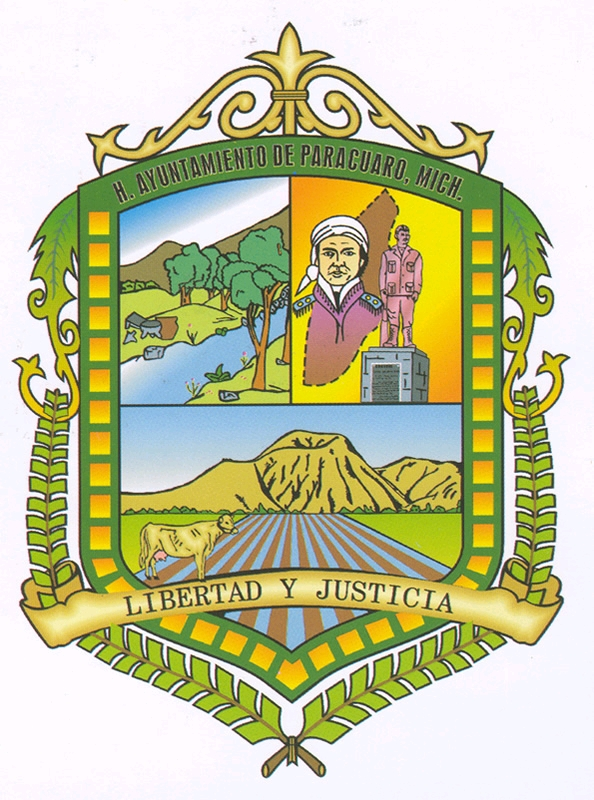
- Coat of arms

- Location of Parácaro

- Location within Michoacán Location within Mexico
- Country: Mexico
- State: Michoacán
- Municipal seat: Parácuaro

Government
  - Municipal president: Noe Zamora Zamora ((PRD))

Population (2020)
  - Total: 26,832
- Time zone: UTC-6 (CST)
- Website: Página web de Parácuaro Michoacan (in Spanish)

Parácuaro is a municipality in the Mexican state of Michoacán. It is a Purépecha word for "place that has sticks for a roof".

== History ==
During the precolumbian era (before October 1492), Parácuaro is thought to have been inhabited by Nahuas and later conquered by chief Tarasco Utucuma.

During the colonial period, the Spanish included Parácuaro in Republic of the Indias and developed the haciendas La Guadalupe, El Valle y La Perla.

From 10 December 1831, Parácuaro appears as Apatzingán's possession and approximately 30 years later on 20 November 1861 it was constituted in municipality by the Congress of the State. It as called Villa de Parácuaro de Morelos.

=== Population ===
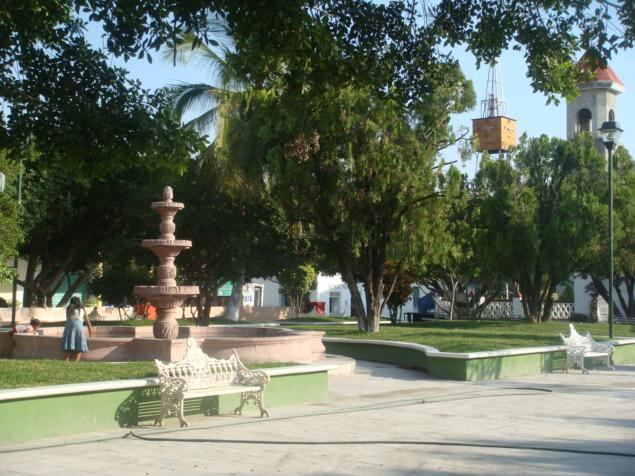
Plaza in Parácuaro

25,582 inhabitants.

=== Geography ===
==== Location ====
It is located in the southwest region of the state at 19° 8'45.83" N and 102°13'9.68" W at a height of 600 meters above sea level. It is bordered on the north by Tancítaro and New Parangaricutiro, on the east by Gabriel Zamora and Múgica, and on the south and the west by Apatzingán. It is 200 km from the capital of Michoacán.

==== Topography ====
Its relief is constituted by the mountain chain of the volcanic transverse system and Tepalcatepec's - Balsa's depression, the hills of Aguacate, Jabalí, Cofradía, Güera, Vueltas, Batea and White.

==== Hydrography ====
Its hydrography is constituted by rivers: Aguacate, Orejón, Lancita, Paracuarito and Manga and the springs of cold water, of the Chicos, the Pozos and Cortijo.

==== Climate ====
It is tropical, with rains in summer. It has an annual rainfall of 800 millimeters and temperatures that range from 14 to 36 °C.

==== Principal ecosystems ====
In the municipality, tropical forest vegetation predominates, with tepeguaje, guaje, ceiba, parota, zapote and mango. The tropical thorny forest, with teteche, viejito, huisache and amole.

== Economy ==
=== Agriculture ===
The principal crops are cotton, rice, corn, melon, sorghum, sesame, tomato, cucumber and watermelon.

=== Ranching ===
Cattle, horses and pigs are raised.

=== Tourism ===
There are two resorts.

=== Trade ===
Parácuaro is self-sufficient in basic products, and emphasizes the marketing of fruits, groceries and vegetables.

=== Services ===
In the Paracuaro's municipal office you can find service of accommodations, bungalows and food service.

== Notable people ==
The best-known person from the town is Alberto Aguilera Valadez, who is better known by his stage name, Juan Gabriel. Romualdo Bucío Bucío, whose stage name is Agustín Bernal, was a prolific actor and director, whose influence on Mexican film has been compared to that of Arnold Schwarzenegger and Sylvester Stalone to Hollywood. Actress Elpidia Carrillo was born in this town as well, coincidentally Elpidia is best known for her role as lead actress in Predator (1987) where she acted alongside Arnold Schwarzenegger.

== Cultural and tourist attractions ==
=== Architectural monuments ===
Parácuaro's parish and monument to Cenobio Moreno.

=== Holidays, dances and traditions ===
- November 20: Celebrates the beginning of the Mexican Revolution.
- 1st to 15 August: Celebrates the holiday of the Virgin of the Assumption.
- September 15 and 16: The native holidays are celebrated.
- Other holidays: Also the carnival holidays are celebrated at the beginning of every year and the Christmas holidays.

=== Crafts ===
Wood furniture and harness-maker's shop.

=== Gastronomy ===
Typical foods of the municipality are: morisqueta, iguana soup, fish soup (bagre, carpa), corn tamales with cream (uchepos), corundas de maíz with cheese and cream, tacos de res y chivo tipo barbacoa, enchiladas con pollo y cecina.
