= Ziracuaretiro =

Ziracuaretiro Municipality
- Municipality
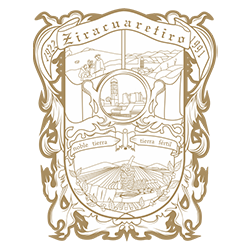
- Coat of arms

- Location of Ziracuaretiro in Mexico
- Coordinates: 19°26′N 101°55′W
- Country: Mexico
- State: Michoacán
- Established: 1930
- Municipal seat: Ziracuaretiro

Government
  - Municipal president: Juan Martin Cardona Talavera

Area
  - Total: 159.93 km^{2} (61.75 sq mi)
- Elevation: 1,380 m (4,530 ft)

Population
  - Total: 15,222
  - Density: 95.179/km^{2} (246.51/sq mi)
- Time zone: UTC-6 (CST)

Ziracuaretiro is a municipality in the Mexican state of Michoacán.

== Political entity ==
Ziracuaretiro is located on the central part of the state at 121 km from the state capital of Morelia. It has a territory of 159.93 km^{2} bordering with Tingambato, Santa Clara, Taretan and Uruapan municipalities, the meaning of the name is: "the place where the warmth ends and the cold starts".

== Geography ==
It has an average altitude of 1,380 meters above the sea level and it also has a tropical climate in summer and the temperature ranges between 8.0 and 37.0 Celsius degrees.

The ecosystem is dominated by mixed forest with species such as pine and oak, and tropical deciduous forest, with species such as cedar, ceiba, and lysiloma acapulcensis. Typical fauna includes deer, rabbit, fox, squirrel, crow, guacamaya, badger, coyote, sparrow and peckerwood.

== History ==
Ziracuaretiro means: "the place where the warmth ends and the cold starts". It was settled years before the arrival of the Spanish people, because of the nature and for the ease to plant fruits. Don Vasco de Quiroga planted 5 different species of bananas which were taken from the island of Santo Domingo.

The current municipality was formed in 1922.
