= Arteaga Municipality, Michoacán =

Coordinates: 18°21′N 102°17′W

Arteaga
- Municipality
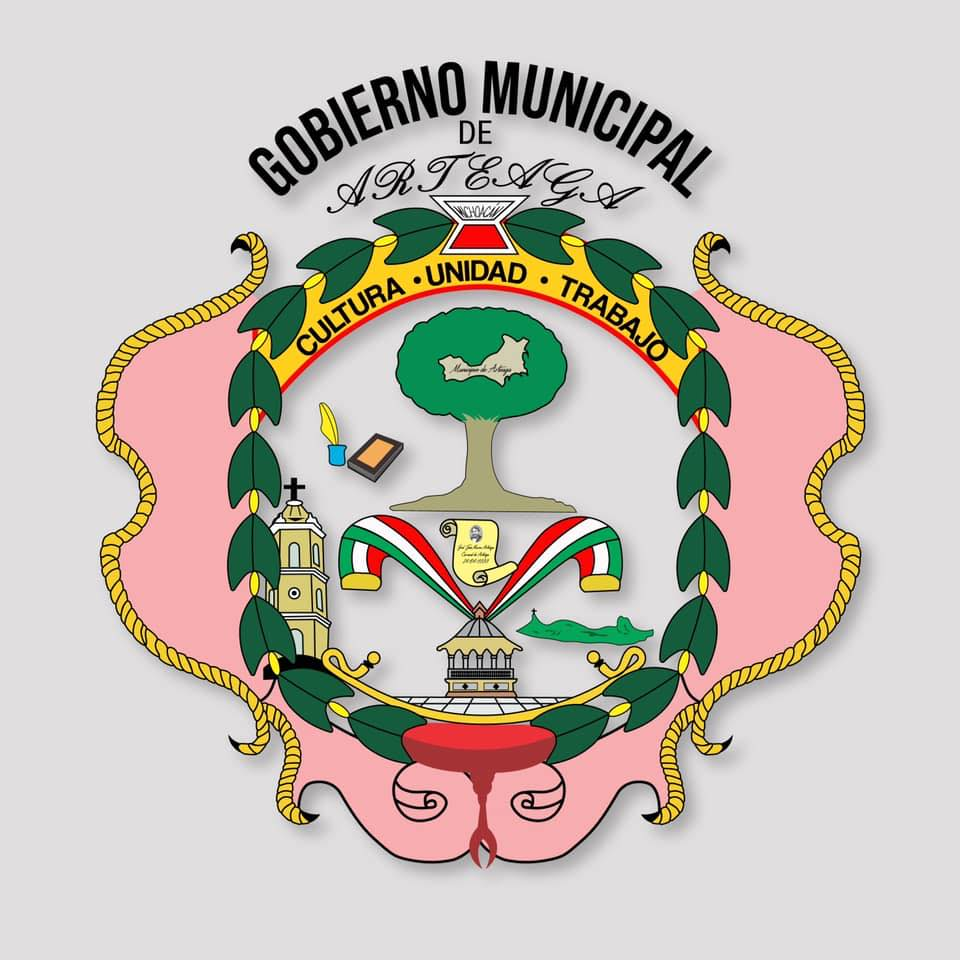
- Coat of arms

- Location in Mexico Arteaga (Mexico)
- Country: Mexico
- State: Michoacán
- Demonym: (in Spanish)
- Time zone: UTC−6 (CST)

Arteaga (Spanish: [aɾteˈaɣa]) is a municipality in the Mexican state of Michoacán, being the largest municipality in Michoacán by area. The municipality has an area of 3,454.71 square kilometers (5.87% of the surface of the state) and is bordered to the north by the municipality of La Huacana, to the east by Churumuco and the state of Guerrero, to the south by Lázaro Cárdenas, and to the west by Coalcomán de Vázquez Pallares, Tumbiscatío, Aguililla and Aquila. In 2020, the population in Arteaga was 20,332 inhabitants (49.5% men and 50.5% women). Compared to 2010, the population in Arteaga decreased by -6.69%. Its the municipal seat is the city of the same name.

The municipality is named in honor of General José María Arteaga Magallanes, a 19th-century national hero and governor of the state of Querétaro de Arteaga.

== See also ==
- Municipalities of Mexico
