= Tumbiscatío =

Coordinates: 18°31′N 102°23′W

- Municipality
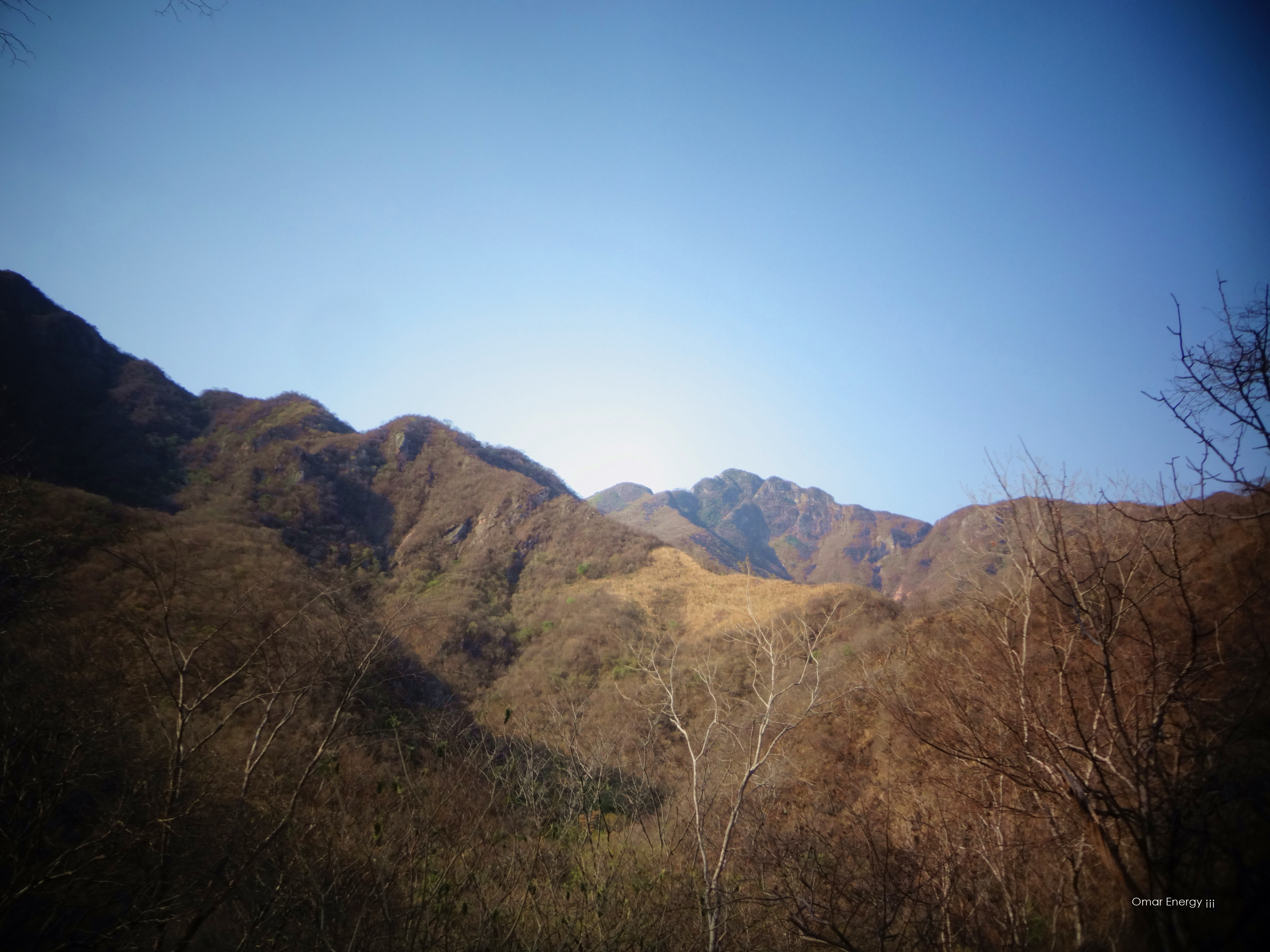

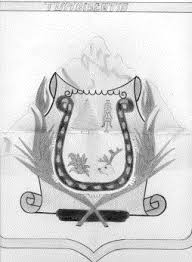
- Coat of arms

- Location in Mexico Tumbiscatío (Mexico)
- Country: Mexico
- State: Michoacán
- Demonym: (in Spanish)
- Time zone: UTC−6 (CST)

Tumbiscatío is a municipality in the southwest region of the Mexican state of Michoacán, being the least densely populated municipality in Michoacán. The municipality has an area of 2,069.48 square kilometres (3.51% of the surface of the state) and is bordered to the north by the municipalities of Apatzingán and La Huacana, to the east and south by Arteaga, to the southwest by Coalcomán de Vázquez Pallares, and to the west by Aguililla. The municipality had a population of 8,373 inhabitants according to the 2005 census. Its municipal seat is the city of Tumbiscatío de Ruiz.
