= La Huacana Municipality =

- Municipality
- La Huacana
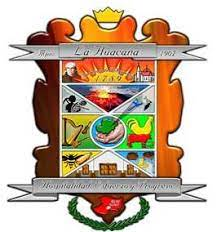
- Coat of arms

- Location of La Huacana in Mexico
- Coordinates: 18°58′15″N 101°48′46″W
- Country: Mexico
- State: Michoacán
- Founded: March 12, 1907

Government
  - Mayor: SALOMON FERNANDO ROSALES REYES
- Elevation: 2,000 m (6,600 ft)

Population (2010)
  - Total: 32,700
- Time zone: UTC-6 (CST)
- Postal code: 61850 -
- Area code: 425
- Website: www

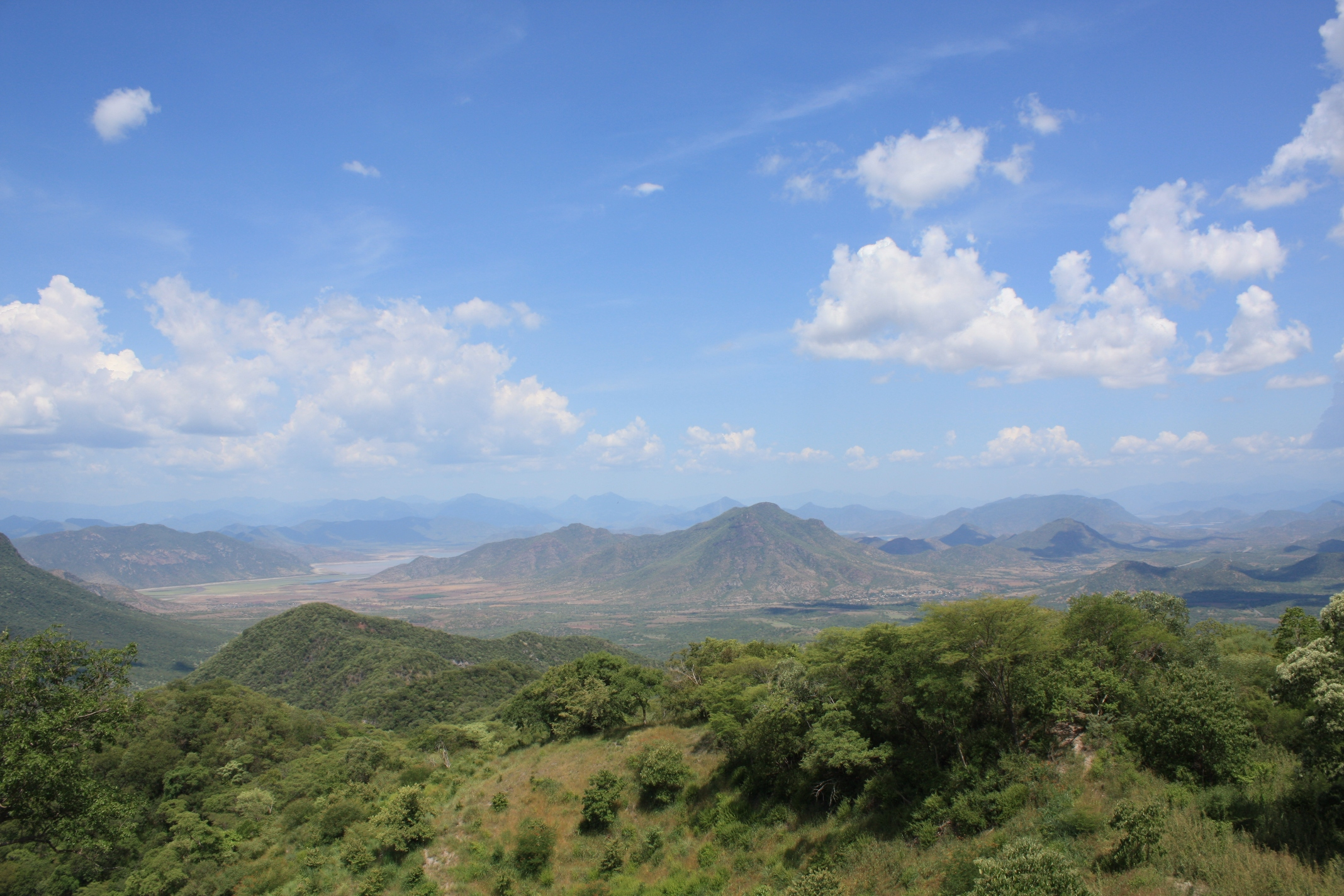
View of the Zicuirán Infiernillo Biosphere Reserve in the foreground, with the state of Guerrero in the background.

La Huacana Municipality is a municipality in the Mexican state of Michoacán. It has a population of 32,757. Its municipal seat is the city of the same name.

== Etymology ==
Huacana is a word of Chichimeca origin that means "Place of Dresses". Another version as to the origin of the name is that it was described only as "A place where a grey hair is floated on the water" by an indigenous inhabitant when she was asked the region's name.

== Populated places in the municipality ==
- La Huacana, the largest town in the municipality, with a population of 9,395.
- Zicuiran, 20 kilometres from the head of the municipality, with a population of 2,921.
- El Chauz, 27 kilometres away, with a population of 2,220.
- Los Olivos, 40 kilometres away, with a population of 624.
- Cupuan del Rio, 48 kilometres away, with a population of 1,536.
- Copales, 15 kilometres away, with a population of 283.
- Oropeo, 20 kilometres away, with a population of 321.

== Geography ==
The municipality has an area of 1,952.60 square kilometres and a population of 32,757 inhabitants according to the 2010 census.

La Huacana municipality is located in the southern part of the state 480 meters above sea level, and is bordered to the north by the municipalities of Nuevo Urecho and Ario, to the east by Turicato, to the south by Churumuco and Arteaga, and to the west by Múgica and Apatzingán. Its distance from the state capital Morelia is 161 kilometers. Its surface area is 1,951.91 km^{2}, representing 3.32% of the whole state.

Its orography is composed of southern foothills of the transverse volcanic system, the hills of Las Canoas, La Copa, El Estribo, La Sierrita and El Milpillas. Features of its hydrography are the rivers Huamito, Pastoria and Capirio, and the streams Zapiero, San Pedro Jorullo and San Antonio. The municipality contains Zicuiran dam and some cold water springs and one hot water spring. Its weather is tropical with summer rains and in other parts it is dry steppe. It has an annual rainfall of 800.0 mm and temperatures ranging from 10 to 54 degrees Celsius. Its forest is mostly made up of pine, oak, shrubbery of different types and hydrophilic vegetation.

== History ==
During the wars before the Spaniards arrived, this place was conquered by the Tarascan state, by the successors of Tariacuri: Hiquingare, Tangaxuan and Hirepan. These rulers, in order to ensure the payment of tribute, appointed Cupauxanti as chieftain. In the 16th century, with the arrival of the Spaniards, shortly after the conquest of Apatzingan, La Huacana became an encomienda under Juan Pantoja. In 1789 Jose Maria Morelos was the curate of the parish of Tamacuaro de la Aguacana.

In 1795, the volcano Jorullo erupted, seriously affecting the village.

On 20 November 1861, the State Congress decreed the creation of the municipality of La Huacana, but this was subsequently reversed. The municipality was reinstated on 12 March 1907.

== Notable people ==
- Ernesto Rodriguez, a social activist, who implemented land redistribution in the area, establishing the first ejido in La Huacana in May 1936. He was killed on 4 December 1937 as a result of this land redistribution.
