= Lázaro Cárdenas, Michoacán =

Municipality in Mexico

Lázaro Cárdenas
- City and municipality
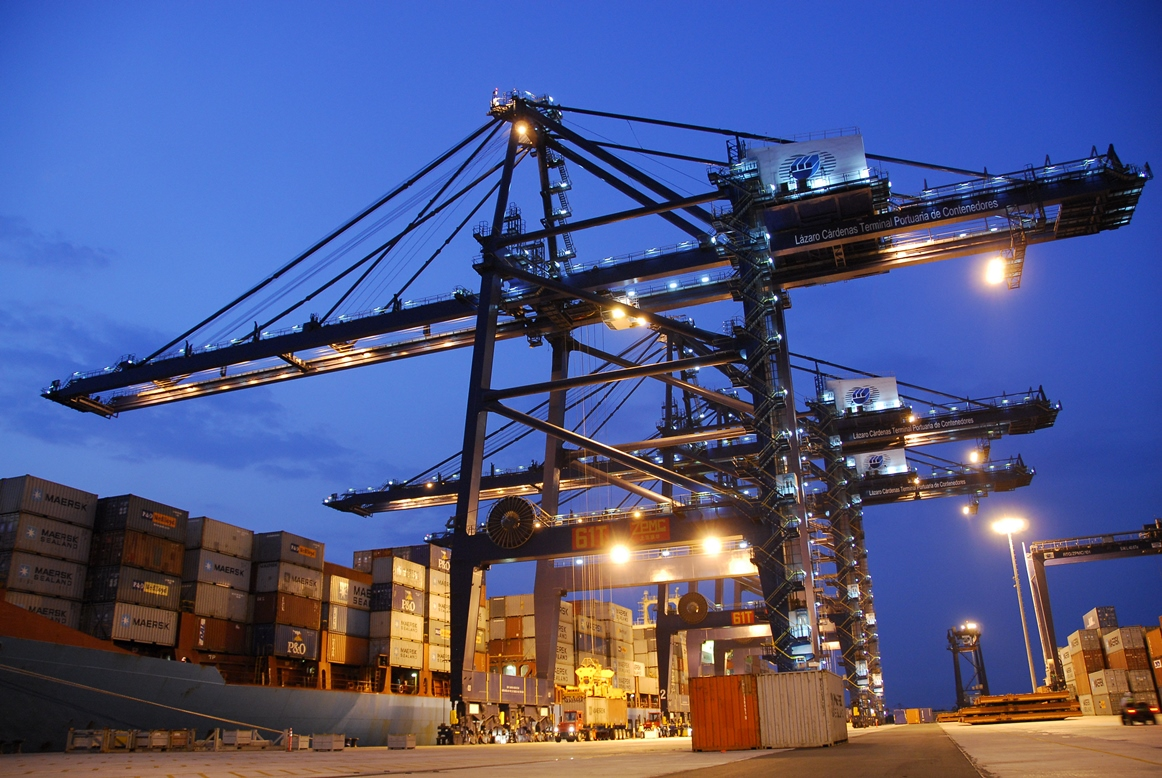
- Port of Lázaro Cárdenas

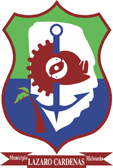
- Coat of arms
- Nickname: Lázaro Cárdenas el Puerto de Todos
- Motto: Lázaro Cárdenas el Puerto sin Limites
- Location of Lázaro Cárdenas in Mexico
- Coordinates: 17°57′22″N 102°11′32″W
- Country: Mexico
- State: Michoacán
- Municipality: Lázaro Cárdenas
- Founded: 1931
- Named for: President Lázaro Cárdenas
- Elevation: 10 m (33 ft)

Population (2020)
  - Total: 196,003
  - City: 83,637
- Time zone: UTC-6 (CST)
- Postal code: 60950 -
- Area code: 753

Lázaro Cárdenas (Spanish: [ˈlasaɾo ˈkardenas]) is a port city in Michoacán bordered to the east by Guerrero. Lázaro Cárdenas is located in the southern part of the Mexican state of Michoacán, being the southernmost municipality in Michoacán. It was formerly known as Los Llanitos, but changed its name as a tribute to Lázaro Cárdenas del Río, a Michoacán-born politician who was president of Mexico from 1934 to 1940.

The city's coordinates are 17°57′00″N 102°12′00″W, where the Río Balsas drains into the Pacific Ocean. In the 2005 census, the city's population was 74,884. It is served by Lázaro Cárdenas Airport. The municipality of Lázaro Cárdenas, which has an area of 1,160.24 km^{2} (447.97 sq mi), had a total population of 162,997 in 2005, and includes the metropolitan area of city, which includes the communities of Las Guacamayas, La Orilla, and La Mira y Guacamayas.

== History ==
When known as Los Llanitos, it formed part of the municipality of Arteaga. In 1932 it was given town status and named Melchor Ocampo, after politician Melchor Ocampo. On April 12, 1937, during the governorship of José María Mendoza Prado, the state congress decreed the creation of the municipality of Melchor Ocampo del Balsas. The name of the municipality changed again on November 17, 1970, to Lázaro Cárdenas, in honor of the popular former president who had died the previous month.

In 2006, steelworkers working in a steel plant went on strike after an explosion killed 65 workers. The militia was ordered to attack the strikers, resulting in numerous injuries and deaths.

In July 2007, a ship was caught by Mexican officials at the port of Lázaro Cárdenas, which originated from Hong Kong, after traveling through the Port of Long Beach with 19 tons of pseudoephedrine, a raw material needed for the manufacturing process of the drug methamphetamine. The Chinese owner Zhenli Ye Gon was found to have $206 million at his Mexico City mansion. The shipment went undetected at Long Beach.

== Air travel ==
The city is served by the Lázaro Cárdenas Airport.

== Port ==
Lázaro Cárdenas is home to a deepwater seaport that handles container, dry bulk, and liquid cargo. The port also exports automobiles from various Mexican assembly plants to markets in southeast Asia and South America. The port handled 1.24 million TEU in 2012 and is expanding to a capacity of 2.2 million TEU annually. Cargo moves to and from the port by road and rail equally, with rail service provided exclusively by Kansas City Southern de México. The port is expected to become a major container facility due to congestion at the U.S. ports of Los Angeles and Long Beach and its relative proximity to major cities such as Chicago, Kansas City, and Houston. In preparation for the port's increased capacity, railway and highway infrastructure running north–south through the center of Mexico has been upgraded to handle the anticipated increase in volume of goods bound for the United States using this transportation corridor. If a proposed government-backed Pacific port is built at Punta Colonet, Baja California, goods flowing to U.S. states like Arizona and Nevada could bypass the congested Los Angeles region with closer access to those markets, providing increased competition with Lázaro Cárdenas.
