= Area codes in Mexico by code (400–499) =

The 400–499 range of area codes in Mexico is reserved for the states of Aguascalientes, Guanajuato, Hidalgo, Jalisco, Estado de México, Michoacán, Nuevo León, Querétaro, San Luis Potosí, Tamaulipas, Veracruz, and Zacatecas. The country code of Mexico is 52.

For other areas, see Area codes in Mexico by code.

City	State	Code	Ref.
Cañada de Caracheo	Guanajuato	411	
Colonia 18 de Marzo	Guanajuato	411	
Cortazar	Guanajuato	411	
El Diezmo	Guanajuato	411	
El Huizache	Guanajuato	411	
El Salteador	Guanajuato	411	
El Tigre	Guanajuato	411	
Hacienda de la Bolsa (La Bolsa)	Guanajuato	411	
Jaral del Progreso	Guanajuato	411	
Juan Lucas	Guanajuato	411	
La Calera (El Canario)	Guanajuato	411	
La Mocha	Guanajuato	411	
Loma de Zempoala	Guanajuato	411	
Ochomitas	Guanajuato	411	
Parangarico	Guanajuato	411	
Providencia de Calera	Guanajuato	411	
San Andres Enguaro	Guanajuato	411	
San Isidro Culiacán	Guanajuato	411	
San José de Gracia	Guanajuato	411	
San José del Cerrito de Camargo	Guanajuato	411	
San Pablo Casacuarán	Guanajuato	411	
San Salvador Torrecillas	Guanajuato	411	
Santa Mónica Ozumbil	Guanajuato	411	
Santa Rosa	Guanajuato	411	
Santiago Capitiro	Guanajuato	411	
Sarabia	Guanajuato	411	
Tierra Fría	Guanajuato	411	
Urireo	Guanajuato	411	
Valencia de Fuentes	Guanajuato	411	
Villagrán	Guanajuato	411	
Zapotitos	Guanajuato	411	
Comonfort	Guanajuato	412	
Emiliano Zapata	Guanajuato	412	
Empalme Escobedo	Guanajuato	412	
Franco Tavera	Guanajuato	412	
Juventino Rosas	Guanajuato	412	
Neutla	Guanajuato	412	
Orduña de Arriba	Guanajuato	412	
Pozos CD. Porfirio Díaz	Guanajuato	412	
Rincón de Centeno	Guanajuato	412	
San Antonio de Morales	Guanajuato	412	
San José de Merino	Guanajuato	412	
Santiago de Cuenda	Guanajuato	412	
Apaseo el Alto	Guanajuato	413	
Apaseo el Grande	Guanajuato	413	
Belen	Guanajuato	413	
Congregación de la Cruz (La Cue)	Guanajuato	413	
El Jocoque	Guanajuato	413	
Ixtla	Guanajuato	413	
La Cuevita	Guanajuato	413	
La Norita	Guanajuato	413	
Marroquín	Guanajuato	413	
Obrajuelo	Guanajuato	413	
Ojo de Agua de la Trinidad	Guanajuato	413	
San Antonio Calichar	Guanajuato	413	
San Bartolomé de Agua Caliente	Guanajuato	413	
San Isidro de Gamboa	Guanajuato	413	
San Juan del Llanito	Guanajuato	413	
San Pedro Tenango El Nuevo	Guanajuato	413	
San Pedro Tenango El Viejo	Guanajuato	413	
Granjas Residenciales	Querétaro	414	
La Fuente	Querétaro	414	
San Nicolás	Querétaro	414	
Santa María del Camino	Querétaro	414	
Tequisquiapan	Querétaro	414	
Atotonilco	Guanajuato	415	
Cerritos	Guanajuato	415	
Corralejo de Arriba	Guanajuato	415	
La Talega	Guanajuato	415	
Los Frailes	Guanajuato	415	
Los Rodríguez	Guanajuato	415	
Nigromante	Guanajuato	415	
Puerto Sosa	Guanajuato	415	
Residencial Malanquin	Guanajuato	415	
San Miguel de Allende	Guanajuato	415	
Santas Marías	Guanajuato	415	
Acámbaro	Guanajuato	417	
Agua Caliente	Guanajuato	417	
Andocutin	Guanajuato	417	
Arroyo Colorado	Guanajuato	417	
Chamácuaro	Guanajuato	417	
Nuevo Chupicuaro	Guanajuato	417	
El Maguey	Guanajuato	417	
Iramuco	Guanajuato	417	
Jaral del Refugio (El Jaral)	Guanajuato	417	
La Encarnación	Guanajuato	417	
Los Organos de Aba	Guanajuato	417	
Loreto (Teresa)	Guanajuato	417	
Obrajuelo	Guanajuato	417	
Parácuaro	Guanajuato	417	
San Diego de Alcalá	Guanajuato	417	
San Juan Jaripeo	Guanajuato	417	
San Mateo Tocuaro	Guanajuato	417	
San Vicente Munguía	Guanajuato	417	
Adjuntas del Río	Guanajuato	418	
Cerrito de San Pablo	Guanajuato	418	
Dolores Hidalgo	Guanajuato	418	
La Sauceda	Guanajuato	418	
Río Laja	Guanajuato	418	
San Antonio El Gallinero	Guanajuato	418	
San Diego de la Unión	Guanajuato	418	
San Gabriel	Guanajuato	418	
Santa Clara	Guanajuato	418	
Santa Teresa	Guanajuato	418	
Xoconoxtle el Grande	Guanajuato	418	
Las Hierbas	Guanajuato	418	
Buenavistilla	Guanajuato	419	
Doctor Mora	Guanajuato	419	
El Capulín	Guanajuato	419	
Jesús María	Guanajuato	419	
Ojo de Agua del Refugio	Guanajuato	419	
San José Iturbide	Guanajuato	419	
San Sebastian del Salitre	Guanajuato	419	
Santa Catarina	Guanajuato	419	
Tierra Blanca	Guanajuato	419	
Victoria	Guanajuato	419	
Xichú	Guanajuato	419	
Ajuchitlán	Querétaro	419	
Colón	Querétaro	419	
El Blanco	Querétaro	419	
Esperanza	Querétaro	419	
Galeras	Querétaro	419	
La Peñuela	Querétaro	419	
Coroneo	Guanajuato	421	
Estanzuela de Romero	Guanajuato	421	
Jerécuaro	Guanajuato	421	
Ojo de Agua de Mendoza	Guanajuato	421	
Piedras de Lumbre	Guanajuato	421	
Puruagua	Guanajuato	421	
Salto de Peña	Guanajuato	421	
San Lorenzo	Guanajuato	421	
San Lucas	Guanajuato	421	
San Pablo	Guanajuato	421	
San Pedro de los Agustinos	Guanajuato	421	
Tarandacuao	Guanajuato	421	
Epitacio Huerta	Michoacán	421	
Ario de Rosales	Michoacán	422	
Gabriel Zamora (Lombardia)	Michoacán	422	
Nuevo Urecho	Michoacán	422	
Taretán	Michoacán	422	
Ahuirán	Michoacán	423	
Arantepacua	Michoacán	423	
Charapan	Michoacán	423	
Cherán Atzicuirin	Michoacán	423	
Cherán	Michoacán	423	
Comachuen	Michoacán	423	
Nahuatzen	Michoacán	423	
Nurio	Michoacán	423	
Ocumicho	Michoacán	423	
Paracho	Michoacán	423	
Quinceo	Michoacán	423	
San Andrés Coru	Michoacán	423	
San Francisco Pichataro	Michoacán	423	
Santiago Tingambato	Michoacán	423	
Sevina	Michoacán	423	
Tanaco	Michoacán	423	
Turicuaro	Michoacán	423	
Ziracuaretiro	Michoacán	423	
Jilotlán de los Dolores	Jalisco	424	
Coalcoman	Michoacán	424	
El Ahuaje	Michoacán	424	
Plaza Vieja	Michoacán	424	
Tepalcatepec	Michoacán	424	
Antunez	Michoacán	425	
Churumuco de Morelos	Michoacán	425	
Condembaro	Michoacán	425	
El Chauz	Michoacán	425	
El Letrero	Michoacán	425	
Gambara	Michoacán	425	
La Huacana	Michoacán	425	
Nueva Italia	Michoacán	425	
Parácuaro	Michoacán	425	
Poturo	Michoacán	425	
Tancítaro	Michoacán	425	
Uspero (Reynosa)	Michoacán	425	
Zicuiran	Michoacán	425	
Aguililla	Michoacán	426	
Buenavista Tomatlán	Michoacán	426	
Catalinas (Francisco Villa)	Michoacán	426	
Dieciocho de Marzo	Michoacán	426	
El Terrero	Michoacán	426	
Felipe Carrillo Puerto (La Ruana)	Michoacán	426	
General Lázaro Cardenas	Michoacán	426	
Pizándaro	Michoacán	426	
Punta del Agua	Michoacán	426	
Santa Ana Amatlán	Michoacán	426	
Polotitlán	Estado de México	427	
Tlaxcalilla	Hidalgo	427	
Dolores Cuadrilla de Enmedio	Querétaro	427	
El Cazadero	Querétaro	427	
San José Galindo	Querétaro	427	
La Estancia	Querétaro	427	
La Valla	Querétaro	427	
Loma Linda	Querétaro	427	
Puerta de Palmillas	Querétaro	427	
San Juan del Río	Querétaro	427	
Santa Matilde	Querétaro	427	
Santa Rosa Xajay	Querétaro	427	
El Carretón	Guanajuato	428	
Jaral de Berrios	Guanajuato	428	
La Escondida	Guanajuato	428	
La Quemada	Guanajuato	428	
Ocampo	Guanajuato	428	
San Bartolo de Berrios	Guanajuato	428	
San Felipe, Guanajuato	Guanajuato	428	
San José de los Barcos (Los Bar)	Guanajuato	428	
San Juan de Llanos	Guanajuato	428	
San Pedro de Ibarra (Ibarra)	Guanajuato	428	
Santa Bárbara	Guanajuato	428	
Santa Rosa	Guanajuato	428	
Platanar	Guanajuato	429	
Abasolo	Guanajuato	429	
Cuerámaro	Guanajuato	429	
El Varal	Guanajuato	429	
Estación Joaquín	Guanajuato	429	
Galera de la Grulla	Guanajuato	429	
Huanimaro	Guanajuato	429	
Huitzatarito	Guanajuato	429	
La Joya de Calvillo	Guanajuato	429	
La Lobera (El Riñón)	Guanajuato	429	
La Nueva Esperanza	Guanajuato	429	
La Presa de Uribe	Guanajuato	429	
Labor de Peralta	Guanajuato	429	
La Luz Masas	Guanajuato	429	
Loma de la Esperanza	Guanajuato	429	
Los Otates	Guanajuato	429	
Ojos de Agua	Guanajuato	429	
Peralta	Guanajuato	429	
Progreso de la Unión	Guanajuato	429	
Pueblo Nuevo	Guanajuato	429	
Rancho de Guadalupe (El Gato)	Guanajuato	429	
Rancho Nuevo de la Cruz	Guanajuato	429	
San Cristóbal de Ayala (San Cristóbal)	Guanajuato	429	
San Gregorio	Guanajuato	429	
San José de Ayala	Guanajuato	429	
Tres villas	Guanajuato	429	
Tupataro	Guanajuato	429	
Yostiro de San Antonio	Guanajuato	429	
Zapote de Peralta	Guanajuato	429	
Cañadas de Obregón	Jalisco	431	
Jalostotitlán	Jalisco	431	
San Gaspar de los Reyes (San Gaspar)	Jalisco	431	
Teocaltitan de Guadalupe	Jalisco	431	
El Jaguey	Guanajuato	432	
Mezquite Gordo	Guanajuato	432	
Santa Rosa de Rivas	Guanajuato	432	
Calzada del Tepozán (El Tepozán)	Guanajuato	432	
Manuel Doblado	Guanajuato	432	
Frías	Guanajuato	432	
Gavia de Rivas	Guanajuato	432	
Guayabo de Santa Rita	Guanajuato	432	
La Calzada de la Merced	Guanajuato	432	
La Sardina	Guanajuato	432	
Las Liebres	Guanajuato	432	
Romita	Guanajuato	432	
San José de Otates	Guanajuato	432	
San Juan de la Puerta	Guanajuato	432	
Zapote de Adjuntas	Guanajuato	432	
Benito Juárez	Zacatecas	433	
Campo Cinco (La Honda)	Zacatecas	433	
Campo Diecisiete (La Honda)	Zacatecas	433	
Charco Blanco	Zacatecas	433	
Colonia Gonzalez Ortega	Zacatecas	433	
Emilio Carranza	Zacatecas	433	
Hidalgo	Zacatecas	433	
Ignacio Zaragoza	Zacatecas	433	
José Santos Bañuelos	Zacatecas	433	
Los Corrales	Zacatecas	433	
Miguel Auza	Zacatecas	433	
San José de Ranchos	Zacatecas	433	
Sombrerete	Zacatecas	433	
Villa Insurgentes (El Calabazal)	Zacatecas	433	
Acuitzio del Canje	Michoacán	434	
Cuanajo	Michoacán	434	
El Pedregal	Michoacán	434	
Erongaicuaro	Michoacán	434	
Fontezuelas	Michoacán	434	
Huiramba	Michoacán	434	
Ihuatzio	Michoacán	434	
Jarácuaro	Michoacán	434	
Lagunillas	Michoacán	434	
Pátzcuaro	Michoacán	434	
Puacuaro	Michoacán	434	
Santa Clara del Cobre	Michoacán	434	
Santa María Huiramangaro (San Juan)	Michoacán	434	
Tzintzuntzan	Michoacán	434	
Zirahuén	Michoacán	434	
Angao de los Herrera	Michoacán	435	
El Rosario	Michoacán	435	
Huetamo	Michoacán	435	
Salguero	Michoacán	435	
San Lucas	Michoacán	435	
Turitzio	Michoacán	435	
Cantabria	Michoacán	436	
La Escondida	Michoacán	436	
San Antonio Tariácuri	Michoacán	436	
Tarejero	Michoacán	436	
Tirindaro	Michoacán	436	
Zacapu	Michoacán	436	
Bolaños	Jalisco	437	
Chimaltitán	Jalisco	437	
Temastian	Jalisco	437	
Totatiche	Jalisco	437	
Villa Guerrero	Jalisco	437	
Atolinga	Zacatecas	437	
Momax	Zacatecas	437	
Tepechitlán	Zacatecas	437	
Tlaltenango	Zacatecas	437	
San Juan Cerano	Guanajuato	438	
Batuecas	Michoacán	438	
El Granjenal	Michoacán	438	
El Pueblito	Michoacán	438	
Galeana	Michoacán	438	
Heroes de Chapultepec	Michoacán	438	
Isaac Arriaga (Santa Ana Mance)	Michoacán	438	
Janambo	Michoacán	438	
Janamuato	Michoacán	438	
La Barranca	Michoacán	438	
La Calera (Nacimientos)	Michoacán	438	
La Excusa	Michoacán	438	
Las Ranas	Michoacán	438	
Mancera	Michoacán	438	
Manuel Villalongín	Michoacán	438	
Pastor Ortiz	Michoacán	438	
Puruándiro	Michoacán	438	
San José Huipana	Michoacán	438	
San Lorenzo	Michoacán	438	
San Martín	Michoacán	438	
San Nicolás	Michoacán	438	
Santa Clara	Michoacán	438	
Tres Mezquites	Michoacán	438	
Villa Morelos	Michoacán	438	
Villachuato	Michoacán	438	
Zapote de Parras	Michoacán	438	
San Luis Potosí	San Luis Potosí	440	
Cuesta Colorada	Hidalgo	441	
El Pinalito	Hidalgo	441	
Jacala	Hidalgo	441	
Agua Zarca	Querétaro	441	
Ahuacatlán de Guadalupe	Querétaro	441	
Bernal	Querétaro	441	
Boye	Querétaro	441	
Cadereyta	Querétaro	441	
El Cuervo	Querétaro	441	
El Lobo	Querétaro	441	
Santa María del Palmar	Querétaro	441	
Ezequiel Montes	Querétaro	441	
Higuerillas	Querétaro	441	
Jalpan de Serra	Querétaro	441	
La Lagunita	Querétaro	441	
Landa	Querétaro	441	
Maconi	Querétaro	441	
Peñamiller	Querétaro	441	
Pinal de Amoles	Querétaro	441	
San Joaquín	Querétaro	441	
San Pablo Toliman	Querétaro	441	
Toliman	Querétaro	441	
Villa Guerrero	Querétaro	441	
Villa Progreso	Querétaro	441	
Vizarrón de Montes	Querétaro	441	
Ameche	Guanajuato	442	
Caleras de Ameche	Guanajuato	442	
Mineral de San Pedro Pozos (Mineral de Pozos)	Guanajuato	442	
Amazcala	Querétaro	442	
Atongo	Querétaro	442	
Buenavista	Querétaro	442	
Casa Blanca	Querétaro	442	
San José el Alto	Querétaro	442	
Charco Blanco	Querétaro	442	
Chichimequillas	Querétaro	442	
El Carmen	Querétaro	442	
El Pueblito	Querétaro	442	
El Rosario	Querétaro	442	
El Salitre	Querétaro	442	
General Lázaro Cárdenas (El Col)	Querétaro	442	
Joaquin Herrera (La Cueva)	Querétaro	442	
Jofrito	Querétaro	442	
Juriquilla	Querétaro	442	
La Cañada	Querétaro	442	
La Estacada	Querétaro	442	
La Gotera	Querétaro	442	
La Griega	Querétaro	442	
La Loma	Querétaro	442	
La Monja	Querétaro	442	
La Piedad (San Miguel Colorado)	Querétaro	442	
Mompani	Querétaro	442	
Montenegro	Querétaro	442	
Palo Alto	Querétaro	442	
Pie de Gallo	Querétaro	442	
Provincia Juriquilla	Querétaro	442	
Querétaro	Querétaro	442	
Saldarriaga	Querétaro	442	
San José el Alto	Querétaro	442	
San Miguelito	Querétaro	442	
San Rafel	Querétaro	442	
Santa Catarina	Querétaro	442	
Santa María de los Baños	Querétaro	442	
Santa Rosa Jáuregui	Querétaro	442	
Tlacote El Bajo	Querétaro	442	
Capula	Michoacán	443	
Chucándiro	Michoacán	443	
Cuto de la Esperanza	Michoacán	443	
Cuto del Porvenir	Michoacán	443	
Iratzio	Michoacán	443	
La Palma (Las Palmas)	Michoacán	443	
Morelia	Michoacán	443	
Salto de Tepuxtepec (Tepuxtepec)	Michoacán	443	
San Bernabe	Michoacán	443	
San Pedro de los Sauces	Michoacán	443	
Santiago Undameo	Michoacán	443	
Tarímbaro	Michoacán	443	
Tejaro de los Izquierdo (Tejaro)	Michoacán	443	
Tiripetio	Michoacán	443	
Tungareo	Michoacán	443	
Tziritzicuaro (Nativitas)	Michoacán	443	
Uruetaro	Michoacán	443	
Agua Señora	San Luis Potosí	444	
Ahualulco	San Luis Potosí	444	
Cerritos de Villa de Pozos	San Luis Potosí	444	
Corte Primero	San Luis Potosí	444	
El Carrizal	San Luis Potosí	444	
El Palmar Primero	San Luis Potosí	444	
Escalerillas	San Luis Potosí	444	
Estacion Hacienda de Bocas	San Luis Potosí	444	
La Loma	San Luis Potosí	444	
La Mantequilla	San Luis Potosí	444	
Los Moreno	San Luis Potosí	444	
Mexquitic de Carmona	San Luis Potosí	444	
Palma de la Cruz	San Luis Potosí	444	
Paso Blanco	San Luis Potosí	444	
Paso Bonito	San Luis Potosí	444	
Ranchería de Guadalupe	San Luis Potosí	444	
Rincón del Porvenir	San Luis Potosí	444	
Rinconada	San Luis Potosí	444	
Lomas de San Francisco	San Luis Potosí	444	
San José de Goméz	San Luis Potosí	444	
San José del Barro	San Luis Potosí	444	
San Juan de Coyotillo	San Luis Potosí	444	
San Luis Potosí	San Luis Potosí	444	
San Marcos Carmona	San Luis Potosí	444	
San Pedro Ojo Zarco	San Luis Potosí	444	
Soledad de Graciano Sánchez	San Luis Potosí	444	
Suspiro Picacho	San Luis Potosí	444	
El Cerro	Guanajuato	445	
El Derramadero	Guanajuato	445	
Huahuemba	Guanajuato	445	
La Barranca	Guanajuato	445	
Moroleón	Guanajuato	445	
Pamaseo	Guanajuato	445	
Piñicuaro	Guanajuato	445	
Sepio	Guanajuato	445	
Uriangato	Guanajuato	445	
Yuriria	Guanajuato	445	
Querétaro	Querétaro	446	
Apeo	Michoacán	447	
Contepec	Michoacán	447	
Maravatío	Michoacán	447	
Santiago Puriatzicuaro	Michoacán	447	
Uripitio	Michoacán	447	
Venta de Bravo	Michoacán	447	
Amealco de Bonfil	Querétaro	448	
El Milagro	Querétaro	448	
El Vegil	Querétaro	448	
Epigmenio González (El Ahorcado)	Querétaro	448	
Escolasticas	Querétaro	448	
Huimilpan	Querétaro	448	
La D	Querétaro	448	
La Noria	Querétaro	448	
La Venta de Ajuchitlancito	Querétaro	448	
Las Taponas	Querétaro	448	
Los Cues	Querétaro	448	
Pedro Escobedo	Querétaro	448	
San Clemente	Querétaro	448	
San Nicólas de la Torre	Querétaro	448	
San Pedro	Querétaro	448	
Santiago Mexquititlán Barrio	Querétaro	448	
Aguascalientes	Aguascalientes	449	
Buenavista de Peñuelas	Aguascalientes	449	
Comunidad El Rocio	Aguascalientes	449	
El Refugio de Peñuelas	Aguascalientes	449	
El Salto de los Salado	Aguascalientes	449	
El Vergel (Paraíso)	Aguascalientes	449	
General Ignacio Zaragoza (Venadero)	Aguascalientes	449	
General José María Morelos y Pavón (Cañada Honda)	Aguascalientes	449	
Jaltomate	Aguascalientes	449	
Jesús María	Aguascalientes	449	
Los Caños (Aguascalientes)	Aguascalientes	449	
Los Negritos	Aguascalientes	449	
Norias de Ojocaliente	Aguascalientes	449	
Peñuelas (El Cienegal)	Aguascalientes	449	
San Ignacio	Aguascalientes	449	
Valladolid	Aguascalientes	449	
Villa Lic. Jesús Terán (Calvill)	Aguascalientes	449	
Araro	Michoacán	451	
Charo	Michoacán	451	
Estación Queréndaro	Michoacán	451	
Heriberto Jara (La Presa)	Michoacán	451	
Indaparapeo	Michoacán	451	
La Goleta	Michoacán	451	
Otzumatlan (Rio de Parras)	Michoacán	451	
Pueblo Viejo	Michoacán	451	
Queréndaro	Michoacán	451	
San Bernardo	Michoacán	451	
San Lucas Pío	Michoacán	451	
San Miguel Buenavista	Michoacán	451	
San Miguel Taimeo (Taimeo)	Michoacán	451	
Santa Clara del Tule	Michoacán	451	
Unión de Progreso (Lomas de Ira)	Michoacán	451	
Valle de Juárez (Jerahuaro)	Michoacán	451	
Zinapécuaro	Michoacán	451	
Zurumbeneo	Michoacán	451	
Ampliación los Angeles	Michoacán	452	
Capacuaro	Michoacán	452	
Corupo	Michoacán	452	
Jucatacato	Michoacán	452	
Nuevo San Juan Parangaricutiro	Michoacán	452	
San Lorenzo	Michoacán	452	
Santa Ana Zirosto	Michoacán	452	
Tumbiscatio de Ruiz	Michoacán	452	
Uruapan	Michoacán	452	
Apatzingán	Michoacán	453	
Cenobio Moreno (Las Colonias)	Michoacán	453	
La Parota	Michoacán	453	
Pareo	Michoacán	453	
Presa del Rosario	Michoacán	453	
San José de Chila	Michoacán	453	
San Juan de los Platanos	Michoacán	453	
Agua Caliente (Ojo de Agua)	Michoacán	454	
Angamacutiro	Michoacán	454	
Bellas Fuentes	Michoacán	454	
Caurio de Guadalupe (Cabrio)	Michoacán	454	
Coeneo de la Libertad	Michoacán	454	
Comanja	Michoacán	454	
Copandaro Rancho Nuevo	Michoacán	454	
Copandaro	Michoacán	454	
Curimeo	Michoacán	454	
El Fresno de la Reforma	Michoacán	454	
El Maluco	Michoacán	454	
Huaniqueo de Morales	Michoacán	454	
La Cañada	Michoacán	454	
Panindicuaro	Michoacán	454	
Puerta de Tierra	Michoacán	454	
Quiroga	Michoacán	454	
San Agustín del Maíz	Michoacán	454	
San Andrés Zirondaro	Michoacán	454	
San Miguel Epejan	Michoacán	454	
Santa Fé de la Laguna	Michoacán	454	
Santiago Conguripo	Michoacán	454	
Villa Jiménez	Michoacán	454	
Álvaro Obregón	Michoacán	455	
Capacho	Michoacán	455	
Chupicuaro	Michoacán	455	
Cuamío	Michoacán	455	
Cuaracurio	Michoacán	455	
Cuitzeo del Porvenir	Michoacán	455	
Huandacareo	Michoacán	455	
Las Trojes	Michoacán	455	
Mariano Escobedo	Michoacán	455	
Puerto de Cabras	Michoacán	455	
Rancho La Begonia	Michoacán	455	
Rancho Nuevo	Michoacán	455	
San Juan Benito Juárez	Michoacán	455	
Santa Ana Maya	Michoacán	455	
Cerro Colorado	Guanajuato	456	
Copales	Guanajuato	456	
El Perico	Guanajuato	456	
El Tambor	Guanajuato	456	
Guarapo	Guanajuato	456	
La Compañía	Guanajuato	456	
Magdalena de Araceo	Guanajuato	456	
Puerta de Andaracua	Guanajuato	456	
Rancho Nuevo de San Andrés	Guanajuato	456	
Rancho Seco de Guantes	Guanajuato	456	
Rincón de Alonso Sánchez	Guanajuato	456	
Rincón de Parangueo	Guanajuato	456	
Salitre de Aguilares	Guanajuato	456	
San Diego Quiriceo	Guanajuato	456	
San Nicólas Parangueo	Guanajuato	456	
San Vicente de Garma (Garma)	Guanajuato	456	
Santa Bárbara	Guanajuato	456	
Valle de Santiago	Guanajuato	456	
Huejúcar	Jalisco	457	
Huejuquilla El Alto	Jalisco	457	
Mezquitic	Jalisco	457	
Tlalcosahua	Jalisco	457	
Chalchihuites	Zacatecas	457	
es:Gualterio	Zacatecas	457	
Jiménez del Teul	Zacatecas	457	
José María Morelos (San Jose de Gracia)	Zacatecas	457	
Laguna Grande	Zacatecas	457	
Lobatos	Zacatecas	457	
Milpillas de la Sierra	Zacatecas	457	
Monte Escobedo	Zacatecas	457	
San Mateo (General Jesús González)	Zacatecas	457	
Valparaíso	Zacatecas	457	
Cosío	Aguascalientes	458	
La Punta	Aguascalientes	458	
Dulce Grande	San Luis Potosí	458	
El Barril	San Luis Potosí	458	
El Zacatón	San Luis Potosí	458	
Hernández	San Luis Potosí	458	
Illescas	San Luis Potosí	458	
Salitral de Carrera	San Luis Potosí	458	
Santo Domingo	San Luis Potosí	458	
Villa de Ramos	San Luis Potosí	458	
Cañitas de Felipe Pescador	Zacatecas	458	
Chaparrosa	Zacatecas	458	
Chupaderos	Zacatecas	458	
Coecillo	Zacatecas	458	
El Rucio	Zacatecas	458	
El Saucito	Zacatecas	458	
El Tule	Zacatecas	458	
Esteban S. Castorena	Zacatecas	458	
General Genaro Codina	Zacatecas	458	
González Ortega (Bañon)	Zacatecas	458	
Bajío de la Tesorera	Zacatecas	458	
Las Lajas	Zacatecas	458	
Luis Moya	Zacatecas	458	
Nueva Pastoría (Las Peñitas)	Zacatecas	458	
Ojocaliente	Zacatecas	458	
Palmillas	Zacatecas	458	
Pánfilo Natera	Zacatecas	458	
Pastoria	Zacatecas	458	
Piedra Gorda	Zacatecas	458	
El Saladillo	Zacatecas	458	
San Cristóbal	Zacatecas	458	
San Pablo	Zacatecas	458	
San Pedro Piedra Gorda	Zacatecas	458	
Santa Elena (Francisco Zarco)	Zacatecas	458	
Villa de Cos	Zacatecas	458	
Carácuaro	Michoacán	459	
Chupío	Michoacán	459	
Etucuaro	Michoacán	459	
Papatzindan de Romero (El Limón)	Michoacán	459	
Paso de Nuñez	Michoacán	459	
Pedernales	Michoacán	459	
Puruarán	Michoacán	459	
San Juan de Viña	Michoacán	459	
Tacámbaro	Michoacán	459	
Tafetán	Michoacán	459	
Tecario	Michoacán	459	
Tiquicheo	Michoacán	459	
Turicato	Michoacán	459	
Tzitzio	Michoacán	459	
Villa Madero	Michoacán	459	
Yoricostio (La Villita)	Michoacán	459	
Arreguín de Abajo	Guanajuato	461	
Celaya	Guanajuato	461	
El Fresno	Guanajuato	461	
El Sauz (El Sauz de Villaseñor)	Guanajuato	461	
Estrada	Guanajuato	461	
Juan Martín	Guanajuato	461	
La Palmita	Guanajuato	461	
Praderas de la Hacienda (Antillón)	Guanajuato	461	
Presa Blanca	Guanajuato	461	
Rincón de Tamayo	Guanajuato	461	
San Isidro de la Concepción	Guanajuato	461	
San José de Guanajuato	Guanajuato	461	
San José el Nuevo	Guanajuato	461	
San Juan de la Vega	Guanajuato	461	
San Miguel Octopan	Guanajuato	461	
Teneria del Santuario	Guanajuato	461	
Yustis	Guanajuato	461	
Rancho Guadalupe (El Ranchito)	Guanajuato	462	
Aldama	Guanajuato	462	
Arandas	Guanajuato	462	
Carrizal Grande	Guanajuato	462	
Charco de Pantoja	Guanajuato	462	
Cuchicuato	Guanajuato	462	
Fraccionamiento Haciendas del C	Guanajuato	462	
Guadalupe de Rivera	Guanajuato	462	
Irapuato	Guanajuato	462	
La Caja	Guanajuato	462	
La Calera	Guanajuato	462	
La Soledad	Guanajuato	462	
Laguna Larga	Guanajuato	462	
Las Cañas	Guanajuato	462	
Las Jicamas	Guanajuato	462	
Lo de Juárez	Guanajuato	462	
Noria de Camarena	Guanajuato	462	
Purísima de Temascatío de Arrib	Guanajuato	462	
Rancho San Javier (San Javier)	Guanajuato	462	
San Antonio de Mogotes	Guanajuato	462	
San Antonio El Rico	Guanajuato	462	
San Nicolás Temascatío	Guanajuato	462	
San Roque	Guanajuato	462	
San Vicente	Guanajuato	462	
Tomelopitos	Guanajuato	462	
Valencianita	Guanajuato	462	
Villas de Irapuato	Guanajuato	462	
El Chique	Zacatecas	463	
Huanusco	Zacatecas	463	
Jalpa	Zacatecas	463	
Tabasco	Zacatecas	463	
Santo Domingo	Guanajuato	464	
Barrón	Guanajuato	464	
Callejones y Granados	Guanajuato	464	
Cardenas	Guanajuato	464	
Cerro Gordo (San Rafael)	Guanajuato	464	
El Recuerdo de Ancon	Guanajuato	464	
La Ordeña	Guanajuato	464	
La Palma	Guanajuato	464	
La Tinaja	Guanajuato	464	
Labor de Valtierra	Guanajuato	464	
Loma Pelada	Guanajuato	464	
Los Prietos (El Cajón)	Guanajuato	464	
Oteros	Guanajuato	464	
Salamanca	Guanajuato	464	
San José de Mendoza	Guanajuato	464	
San José Temascatio	Guanajuato	464	
San Vicente de Flores	Guanajuato	464	
Valtierrilla	Guanajuato	464	
Carboneras	Aguascalientes	465	
Colonia Macario J. Gómez	Aguascalientes	465	
El Chayote	Aguascalientes	465	
Emiliano Zapata	Aguascalientes	465	
Escaleras	Aguascalientes	465	
Fraccionamiento Campestre San C	Aguascalientes	465	
Mesillas	Aguascalientes	465	
Pabellón de Arteaga	Aguascalientes	465	
Pabellón de Hidalgo	Aguascalientes	465	
Paredes	Aguascalientes	465	
Rincón de Romos	Aguascalientes	465	
San Antonio	Aguascalientes	465	
San Francisco de los Romo	Aguascalientes	465	
San Jacinto	Aguascalientes	465	
San José de Gracia	Aguascalientes	465	
Tepezala	Aguascalientes	465	
La Estancia de San José del Carmen	Guanajuato	466	
La Luz	Guanajuato	466	
Cupareo	Guanajuato	466	
El Sabino	Guanajuato	466	
Galera de Panales (Panales)	Guanajuato	466	
Huapango	Guanajuato	466	
La Quemada	Guanajuato	466	
Llano Grande	Guanajuato	466	
Los Fierros	Guanajuato	466	
Maravatio del Encinal	Guanajuato	466	
La Moncada	Guanajuato	466	
Ojo de Agua de Ballesteros	Guanajuato	466	
Salvatierra	Guanajuato	466	
San Miguel Emenguaro	Guanajuato	466	
San Nicolás de la Condesa	Guanajuato	466	
San Nicolás de los Agustinos	Guanajuato	466	
San Pablo Pejo (San Pablo)	Guanajuato	466	
San Pedro de los Naranjos	Guanajuato	466	
Santiago Maravatío	Guanajuato	466	
Tarimoro	Guanajuato	466	
Apozol	Zacatecas	467	
Benito Juárez (Mpio. B. Juárez)Florencia de Benito Juárez	Zacatecas	467	
Cuxpala	Zacatecas	467	
García de la Cadena	Zacatecas	467	
Ignacio Allende	Zacatecas	467	
Juchipila	Zacatecas	467	
Mezquital del Oro	Zacatecas	467	
Milpillas de Allende	Zacatecas	467	
Moyahua	Zacatecas	467	
Teul de González Ortega	Zacatecas	467	
Covadonga	Guanajuato	468	
Crucero San Luis de la Paz	Guanajuato	468	
Fraccion de Lourdes (Lourdes)	Guanajuato	468	
San Luis de la Paz	Guanajuato	468	
Aratzipu	Guanajuato	469	
Buenavista de Cortés	Guanajuato	469	
Colonia Morelos	Guanajuato	469	
Corralejo de Hidalgo	Guanajuato	469	
Cruces de Rojas	Guanajuato	469	
El Mármol	Guanajuato	469	
Estación Pénjamo	Guanajuato	469	
Huandarillo (Guandarillo)	Guanajuato	469	
La Atarjea	Guanajuato	469	
La Cal Grande	Guanajuato	469	
La Calle	Guanajuato	469	
La Estancia del Refugio	Guanajuato	469	
Laguna Larga de Cortes	Guanajuato	469	
Lagunillas	Guanajuato	469	
Los Ocotes	Guanajuato	469	
Magallanes	Guanajuato	469	
Ordeñita de Barajas (Ordeña de Barajas)	Guanajuato	469	
Palo Alto de Abajo	Guanajuato	469	
Palo Verde	Guanajuato	469	
Pénjamo	Guanajuato	469	
Potreros	Guanajuato	469	
San Felipe (El Chilarillo)	Guanajuato	469	
San Gabriel (San Gabriel y San Ignacio)	Guanajuato	469	
Tacubaya	Guanajuato	469	
Zapote de Cestau	Guanajuato	469	
Acuitzeramo	Michoacán	471	
La Yerbabuena	Michoacán	471	
Purépero	Michoacán	471	
Tlazazalca	Michoacán	471	
Aguas Buenas	Guanajuato	472	
Bajío de Bonillas	Guanajuato	472	
Chichimequillas	Guanajuato	472	
Comanjilla	Guanajuato	472	
Exhacienda de Trejo	Guanajuato	472	
La Aldea	Guanajuato	472	
Los Rodríguez	Guanajuato	472	
Nuevo México	Guanajuato	472	
Paxtle	Guanajuato	472	
Silao	Guanajuato	472	
Arperos	Guanajuato	473	
Cañada de Bustos	Guanajuato	473	
Guanajuato	Guanajuato	473	
La Luz Mineral de la Luz	Guanajuato	473	
Llanitos de Santa Ana	Guanajuato	473	
Los Lorenzos	Guanajuato	473	
Marfil	Guanajuato	473	
Puentecillas	Guanajuato	473	
San José de Llanos	Guanajuato	473	
Santa Fe de Guadalupe (La Sauce)	Guanajuato	473	
Santa Rosa de Lima	Guanajuato	473	
Santa Teresa	Guanajuato	473	
Yerbabuena	Guanajuato	473	
Betulia	Jalisco	474	
Dieciocho de Marzo	Jalisco	474	
El Puesto	Jalisco	474	
Lagos de Moreno	Jalisco	474	
Los Azulitos	Jalisco	474	
Matanzas	Jalisco	474	
Paso de Cuarenta	Jalisco	474	
San Cristóbal	Jalisco	474	
San José de los Reynoso	Jalisco	474	
Bajío de San José	Jalisco	475	
Encarnación de Díaz	Jalisco	475	
Estación San Juan de los Lagos	Jalisco	475	
Mesón de los Sauces	Jalisco	475	
San Sebastián del Alamo	Jalisco	475	
Santa María de Abajo	Jalisco	475	
San Isidro	Guanajuato	476	
Cañada de Negros	Guanajuato	476	
Dolores	Guanajuato	476	
El Nacimiento	Guanajuato	476	
El Tecolote	Guanajuato	476	
El Toro	Guanajuato	476	
Guadalupe de Jalpa	Guanajuato	476	
Jalpa de Canovas	Guanajuato	476	
Jesús del Monte (El Talayote)	Guanajuato	476	
Loma de San Rafael	Guanajuato	476	
aguey	Guanajuato	476	
Peñuelas	Guanajuato	476	
Potrerillos (Guanajal)	Guanajuato	476	
Purísima de Bustos	Guanajuato	476	
San Cristóbal (El Cerrito)	Guanajuato	476	
San Francisco del Rincón	Guanajuato	476	
San Ignacio de Hidalgo (San Ign)	Guanajuato	476	
San Jerónimo	Guanajuato	476	
San Roque de Montes (San Roque)	Guanajuato	476	
Sauz de Armenta	Guanajuato	476	
Silva	Guanajuato	476	
Álvaro Obregón	Guanajuato	477 / 479	
Barretos	Guanajuato	477 / 479	
Duarte	Guanajuato	477 / 479	
El Ramillete	Guanajuato	477 / 479	
Lagunillas (Mpio. León)	Guanajuato	477 / 479	
Las Hilamas (El Piedrero)	Guanajuato	477 / 479	
León	Guanajuato	477 / 479	
Los Ramirez	Guanajuato	477 / 479	
Los Sauces	Guanajuato	477 / 479	
Loza de los Padres	Guanajuato	477 / 479	
Medina	Guanajuato	477 / 479	
Nuevo Valle de Moreno	Guanajuato	477 / 479	
Plan de Ayala (Santa Rosa)	Guanajuato	477 / 479	
Plan Guanajuato (La Sandía)	Guanajuato	477 / 479	
San José de los Sapos (Santa El)	Guanajuato	477 / 479	
San Juan de Otates	Guanajuato	477 / 479	
San Judas	Guanajuato	477 / 479	
Calera de Víctor Rosales	Zacatecas	478	
General Enrique Estrada	Zacatecas	478	
Pánuco	Zacatecas	478	
Pozo de Gamboa	Zacatecas	478	
Ramón López Velarde (Toribio)	Zacatecas	478	
San Antonio del Ciprés	Zacatecas	478	
Álvaro Obregón (Pujal)	San Luis Potosí	481	
Ciudad Valles	San Luis Potosí	481	
Laguna del Mante	San Luis Potosí	481	
Rascón	San Luis Potosí	481	
San Felipe	San Luis Potosí	481	
Agua Buena	San Luis Potosí	482	
Alaquines	San Luis Potosí	482	
Aquismón	San Luis Potosí	482	
Ciudad del Maíz	San Luis Potosí	482	
Colonia Álvaro Obregón	San Luis Potosí	482	
Colonia El Meco	San Luis Potosí	482	
Damián Carmona	San Luis Potosí	482	
El Naranjo	San Luis Potosí	482	
Huehuetlan	San Luis Potosí	482	
Huichihuayan	San Luis Potosí	482	
Tamasopo	San Luis Potosí	482	
Tambaca	San Luis Potosí	482	
Tancanhuitz	San Luis Potosí	482	
Tanchanaco	San Luis Potosí	482	
Nuevo Morelos	Tamaulipas	482	
Chapulhuacán	Hidalgo	483	
Coacuilco	Hidalgo	483	
Huitzitzilingo	Hidalgo	483	
Pisaflores, Hidalgo	Hidalgo	483	
San Felipe Orizatlán	Hidalgo	483	
Chapulhuacanito	San Luis Potosí	483	
El Huexco	San Luis Potosí	483	
Matlapa	San Luis Potosí	483	
San Martín Chalchicuautla	San Luis Potosí	483	
Tamán	San Luis Potosí	483	
Tamazunchale	San Luis Potosí	483	
Tampacan	San Luis Potosí	483	
Bledos	San Luis Potosí	485	
Enramadas	San Luis Potosí	485	
Exhacienda de Jesús María	San Luis Potosí	485	
Laguna de San Vicente	San Luis Potosí	485	
Ojo Caliente	San Luis Potosí	485	
Santa María del Río	San Luis Potosí	485	
Tierranueva	San Luis Potosí	485	
Villa de Arriaga	San Luis Potosí	485	
Villa de Reyes	San Luis Potosí	485	
Buenavista	San Luis Potosí	486	
Cerritos	San Luis Potosí	486	
Charcas	San Luis Potosí	486	
Entronque de Matehuala (El Huiz)	San Luis Potosí	486	
Granjenal	San Luis Potosí	486	
Guadalcázar	San Luis Potosí	486	
La Hincada	San Luis Potosí	486	
Moctezuma	San Luis Potosí	486	
Peotillos	San Luis Potosí	486	
Santa Catarina	San Luis Potosí	486	
Venado	San Luis Potosí	486	
Villa de Arista	San Luis Potosí	486	
Villa de Guadalupe	San Luis Potosí	486	
Villa Hidalgo	San Luis Potosí	486	
Villa Juárez	San Luis Potosí	486	
Arroyo Seco	Querétaro	487	
Conca	Querétaro	487	
Refugio	Querétaro	487	
Cañada Grande	San Luis Potosí	487	
Cárdenas	San Luis Potosí	487	
Ciudad Fernandez	San Luis Potosí	487	
El Capulín	San Luis Potosí	487	
El Jabalí	San Luis Potosí	487	
La Reforma	San Luis Potosí	487	
Plazuela	San Luis Potosí	487	
Progreso	San Luis Potosí	487	
Rayón	San Luis Potosí	487	
Rioverde	San Luis Potosí	487	
San Ciro de Acosta	San Luis Potosí	487	
San Diego	San Luis Potosí	487	
San José del Tapanco	San Luis Potosí	487	
Doctor Arroyo	Nuevo León	488	
Mier y Noriega	Nuevo León	488	
Cedral	San Luis Potosí	488	
Estación Catorce	San Luis Potosí	488	
Estación Wadley	San Luis Potosí	488	
La Paz	San Luis Potosí	488	
Matehuala	San Luis Potosí	488	
Real de Catorce	San Luis Potosí	488	
Tanque Colorado	San Luis Potosí	488	
Vanegas	San Luis Potosí	488	
Axtla de Terrazas	San Luis Potosí	489	
Coxcatlán	San Luis Potosí	489	
Jalpilla	San Luis Potosí	489	
Las Palmas	San Luis Potosí	489	
San Antonio	San Luis Potosí	489	
San Vicente Tancuayalab	San Luis Potosí	489	
Tampamolón Corona	San Luis Potosí	489	
Tamuín	San Luis Potosí	489	
Tanlajas	San Luis Potosí	489	
Tanquián de Escobedo	San Luis Potosí	489	
Xilitla	San Luis Potosí	489	
El Higo	Veracruz	489	
El Bordo Buenavista	Zacatecas	492	
Guadalupe	Zacatecas	492	
Hacienda Nueva	Zacatecas	492	
La Escondida	Zacatecas	492	
La Luz	Zacatecas	492	
Martínez Domínguez	Zacatecas	492	
Morelos	Zacatecas	492	
Pimienta	Zacatecas	492	
San Jerónimo	Zacatecas	492	
San José de la Era	Zacatecas	492	
Sauceda de la Borda	Zacatecas	492	
Tacoaleche	Zacatecas	492	
Trancoso	Zacatecas	492	
Vetagrande	Zacatecas	492	
Zacatecas	Zacatecas	492	
Zoquite	Zacatecas	492	
Altamira	Zacatecas	493	
El Salto de Santa Cruz	Zacatecas	493	
Estación San José	Zacatecas	493	
Fresnillo	Zacatecas	493	
Estación Gutiérrez	Zacatecas	493	
Miguel Hidalgo (Hidalgo)	Zacatecas	493	
Monte Mariana	Zacatecas	493	
Plateros	Zacatecas	493	
Plenitud	Zacatecas	493	
Rafael Yañez Sosa (El Mezquite)	Zacatecas	493	
Rancho Grande	Zacatecas	493	
Río Florido	Zacatecas	493	
San José de Lourdes	Zacatecas	493	
Seis de Enero	Zacatecas	493	
Jerez de García Salinas	Zacatecas	494	
El Cargadero	Zacatecas	494	
El Durazno	Zacatecas	494	
Ermita de Guadalupe	Zacatecas	494	
Ermita de los Correa	Zacatecas	494	
El Huejote	Zacatecas	494	
Los Haro	Zacatecas	494	
Susticacán	Zacatecas	494	
Tepetongo	Zacatecas	494	
Calvillo	Aguascalientes	495	
Chiquihuitero (San Isidro)	Aguascalientes	495	
El Salitre	Aguascalientes	495	
Jaltiche de Abajo	Aguascalientes	495	
La Labor	Aguascalientes	495	
La Panadera	Aguascalientes	495	
Malpaso	Aguascalientes	495	
San Tadeo	Aguascalientes	495	
Tepusco	Jalisco	495	
Villa Hidalgo	Jalisco	495	
Amarillas de Esparza	Aguascalientes	496	
Asientos	Aguascalientes	496	
Ciénaga Grande	Aguascalientes	496	
Palo Alto	Aguascalientes	496	
Pilotos	Aguascalientes	496	
Pino Suárez (Rancho Viejo)	Aguascalientes	496	
Villa Juárez	Aguascalientes	496	
Guadalupe Victoria	Jalisco	496	
La Paz	Jalisco	496	
Los Campos	Jalisco	496	
Matancillas	Jalisco	496	
Ojuelos de Jalisco	Jalisco	496	
Palma Pegada	San Luis Potosí	496	
Salinas de Hidalgo	San Luis Potosí	496	
Bajío de San Nicolás (San Nicol)	Zacatecas	496	
Cerrito del Agua	Zacatecas	496	
Colonia Madero (Madero)	Zacatecas	496	
El Nigromante	Zacatecas	496	
El Obraje	Zacatecas	496	
El Sitio	Zacatecas	496	
Estancia de Animas	Zacatecas	496	
Estancia de Guadalupe	Zacatecas	496	
González Ortega	Zacatecas	496	
José María Morelos	Zacatecas	496	
José María Pino Suárez	Zacatecas	496	
La Concepción	Zacatecas	496	
La Estrella	Zacatecas	496	
La Lobeña	Zacatecas	496	
La Victoria	Zacatecas	496	
Loreto	Zacatecas	496	
Maravillas	Zacatecas	496	
Noria de Angeles	Zacatecas	496	
Ojo de Agua de la Palma	Zacatecas	496	
Pedregoso	Zacatecas	496	
Pinos	Zacatecas	496	
San Marcos	Zacatecas	496	
Santa Elena	Zacatecas	496	
Tierra Blanca	Zacatecas	496	
Villa García	Zacatecas	496	
Villa Hidalgo	Zacatecas	496	
Boquilla de Arriba	Zacatecas	498	
Emiliano Zapata (Morones)	Zacatecas	498	
Emiliano Zapata (San José)	Zacatecas	498	
Francisco García Salinas	Zacatecas	498	
General Juan José Ríos (Ciénega)	Zacatecas	498	
Juan Aldama	Zacatecas	498	
Las Esperanzas (El Ranchito)	Zacatecas	498	
Los Márquez	Zacatecas	498	
Nieves	Zacatecas	498	
Ojitos	Zacatecas	498	
Progreso de Alfonso Medina (Colonia Progreso)	Zacatecas	498	
Río de Medina	Zacatecas	498	
Río Grande	Zacatecas	498	
Sain Alto	Zacatecas	498	
Santa Rita	Zacatecas	498	
Tetillas	Zacatecas	498	
Colotlán	Jalisco	499	
Atitanac	Zacatecas	499	
Felipe Angeles	Zacatecas	499	
Malpaso	Zacatecas	499	
San José de Tayahua	Zacatecas	499	
Villanueva	Zacatecas	499	
