= Salgueiro (surname) =

Salgueiro (willow in the Portuguese language) is a surname. Notable people with the surname include:

- Enrique Salgueiro (born 1981), Spanish cyclist
- Jess Salgueiro, Canadian actress
- Juan Manuel Salgueiro (born 1983), Uruguayan footballer
- Lidia Salgueiro (1917–2009), Portuguese atomic and nuclear physicist
- Teresa Salgueiro (born 1969), Portuguese singer

== See also ==
- Salguero
