= San Vicente Ferrer, Querétaro =

Settlement in Querétaro, Mexico

San Vicente Ferrer is a settlement in El Marqués, Querétaro, Mexico. It is named for Saint Vincent Ferrer.

In 2023, the National Commission of Natural Protected Areas declared the Peña Colorada a protected area, which in part aided the preservation of San Vicente Ferrer's archaeological site. The same year, Governor Mauricio Kuri González headed the development of State Highway 540 between San Vicente Ferrer and Chichimequillas.
