= Acuitzeramo, Michoacán =

Acuitzeramo (Spanish pronunciation: [akwitseˈɾamo]) is a small town located in the municipality of Tlazazalca in the Mexican state of Michoacán.
