= Mateo Elías Nieves Castillo =

Mexican Catholic priest, martyr, and blessed (1882–1928)

Blessed Mateo Elías Nieves Castillo O.S.A.
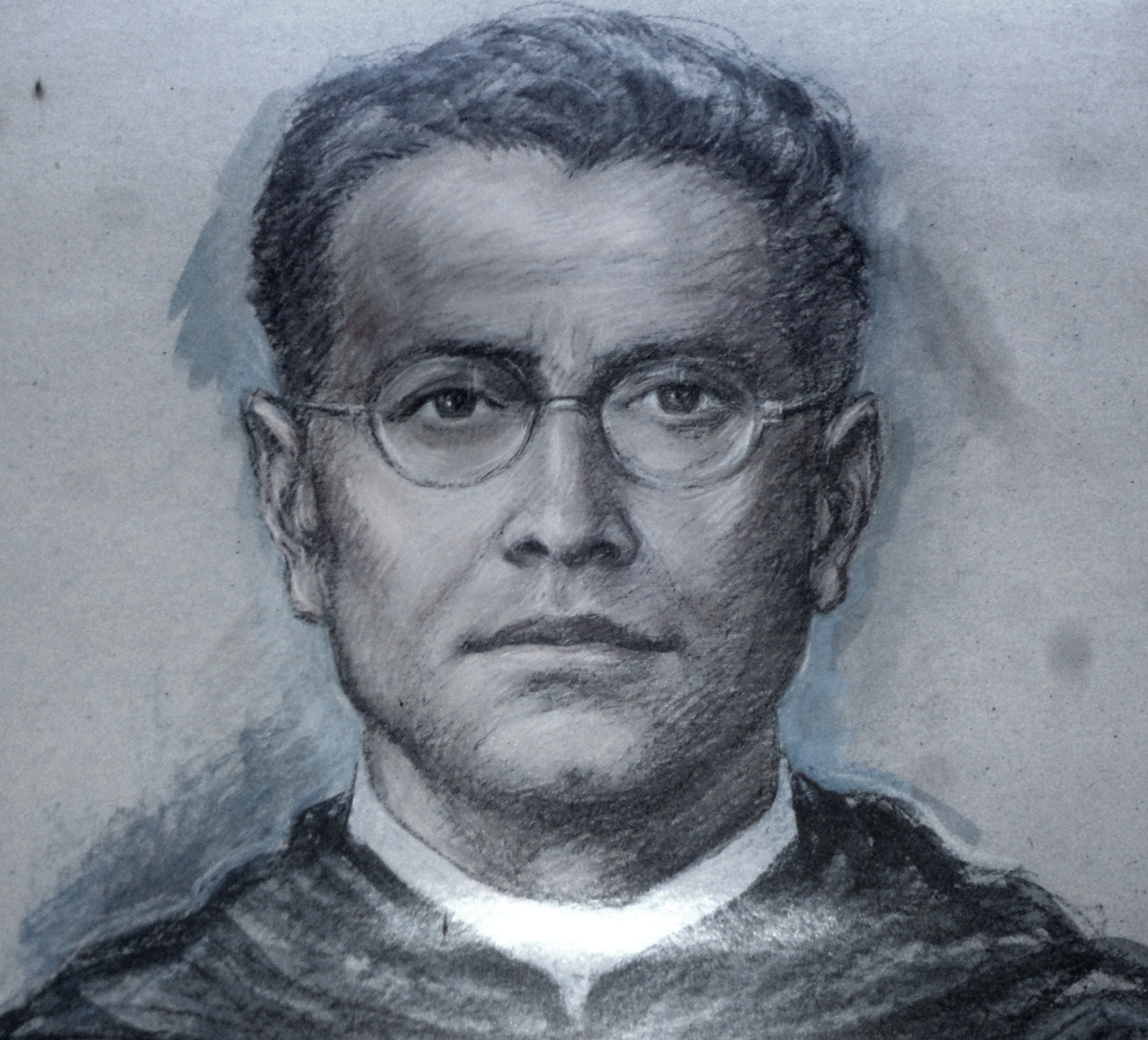
- Illustration

Priest
- Born: 21 September 1882; Yuriria, Guanajuato, Mexico
- Died: 10 March 1928 (aged 45); Cañada de Caracheo, Guanajuato, Mexico
- Venerated in: Roman Catholic Church
- Beatified: 12 October 1997, Saint Peter's Square, Vatican City by Pope John Paul II
- Feast: 10 March
- Attributes: Cassock
- Patronage: Mexico; Prisoners; Illness

Mateo Elías Nieves Castillo (21 September 1882 – 10 March 1928) was a Mexican Catholic priest who was also a member of the Order of Saint Augustine who assumed the name of Elias del Socorro when he became a member of the order.

Pope John Paul II beatified him on 12 October 1997 without a miracle because he was killed in odium fidei and declared a martyr. Therefore, his beatification did not require a miracle. Instead it was proved that he was killed in hatred of the faith. A miracle is now under investigation for prospective sainthood.

== Life ==
Mateo Elías Nieves Castillo was born on 21 September 1882 as a sick child to Ramón and Rita and was baptized on the same day due to fears that he would not live for long. He almost died of tuberculosis at the age of twelve and his father soon died after he rallied from his ailment.

Castillo was admitted to the Augustinian college in Yuriria at the age of 22, which was older than the standard admission age. He took his vows in 1911 and received the name of "Elias del Socorro". He was ordained to the priesthood on 9 April 1916 and served as a vicar in Cañada de Caracheo in 1921.

At the time of the government persecution of the Roman Catholic Church he refused to submit and moved to the hillside where he served his parish during the night so as not to be caught. He was arrested and was shot to death on the side of the road. His final words were: "Long live Christ the King!"

There is a memorial to him, and Jesús and Dolores Sierra who died with him, at Cañada de Caracheo in Cortazar, Guanajuato.

== Beatification ==
Portrait of Castillo in the Saint Augustinus Church in Miguel Hidalgo, Mexico City

The beatification cause for the Servant of God commenced in Morelia in October 1957 and concluded its work in June 1959. The process was ratified in 1992 and the Positio - documentation on his murder being "in odium fidei" - was sent to the Congregation for the Causes of Saints in 1994.

Pope John Paul II approved the decision that Castillo died in hatred of the faith and beatified him on 12 October 1997.

A miracle attributed to him was discovered and was investigated. The process was ratified in 2010. The miracle will have to be approved before his canonization can proceed.
