= Arantepacua =

Locality in Nahuatzen, Michoacán, Mexico

- Locality
- Location within Michoacán Location within Mexico
- Coordinates: 19°35′44″N 101°58′06″W
- Country: Mexico
- State: Michoacán
- Municipality: Nahuatzen

Population (2020)
  - Total: 3,505

Arantepacua is a locality located in the municipality of Nahuatzen, in the Mexican state of Michoacán. As of 2020, it has a population of 3,505. Arantepacua's autonomous form of governance, and environmental policies, have drawn comparisons to nearby municipality of Cherán.

== History ==
Since the 1950s, Arantepacua has had a territorial dispute with the neighboring community of Capácuaro over 1,000 hectares (2,500 acres) of forested land. Locals allege that by the 2010s, Arantepacua had a longstanding feud with the state government, due to such territorial disputes, and claimed that state police were overzealous in policing the town as a result.

On 4 April 2017, a delegation from Arantepacua had traveled to the nearby city of Morelia to meet with representatives. On the way back, state police stopped and arrested the delegation. Members of the delegation said the state police accused them of blocking a nearby road, and stealing their vehicle, and that the state police beat and used tear gas on them.

On 5 April 2017, residents of Arantepacua protested the arrest of the delegates, and blockaded a highway running through the settlement. That day, Michoacán state police conducted a raid on the settlement with the stated purpose of retrieving stolen vehicles. Some locals claim that the raid that day was a guise for state police to punish the Arantepacua for these disputes. Eyewitnesses allege that the raid consisted of more than 800 police officers, who started firing live bullets indiscriminately. The raid killed four people, and resulted in 38 arrests, and 31 people injured. Mexico's National Human Rights Commission called the events that day "serious violations of the rights to life, liberty, security and personal integrity - due to acts constituting torture -, of meeting, to the best interest of children and a life free of violence, to the detriment of the indigenous population".

The following day, Arantepacua set up a makeshift checkpoint to prevent police entry, and began overhauling its local government. In the aftermath of the raid, Arantepacua applied for autonomy, which the Constitution of Mexico allows for Indigenous communities. Arantepacua was formally granted autonomy in 2018.

== Demographics ==
As of 2020, Arantepacua has a population of 3,505, comprising 1,690 males, and 1,815 females. 1,027 of its residents (29.30%) are aged 14 and under, 900 (25.68%) are aged 15 to 29, 1,202 (34.29%) are aged 30 to 59, and 376 (10.73%) are aged 60 and older. Mexico's National Institute of Statistics and Geography classifies 140 of its residents (3.99%) as disabled.

== Environmental issues ==
Various neighboring communities to Arantepacua, including Carácuaro and Turícuaro, have significantly expanded avocado cultivation in the early 2020s, which some Arantepacua residents say has resulted in deforestation, water scarcity, and significant agrochemical usage. Upon achieving autonomy in 2018, Arantepacua's new government outlawed avocado cultivation on communal forests.

== See also ==
- Cherán
- Nahuatzen
