= Santa Ana Maya =

Coordinates: 20°00′N 101°01′W

Santa Ana Maya Municipality Municipio de Santa Ana Maya
- municipality
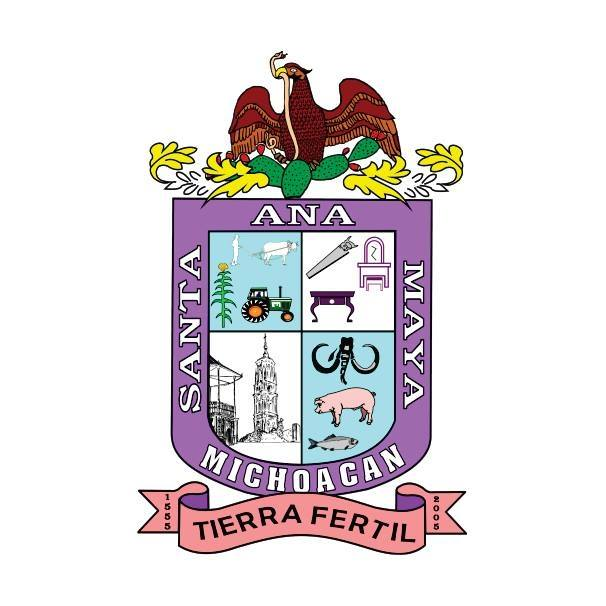
- Coat of arms

- Location within Mexico
- Country: Mexico
- State: Michoacán
- municipality: Santa Ana Maya

Government
  - Mayor: )

Area
  - Total: 102 km^{2} (39 sq mi)

Population (2005)
  - Total: 13,737 (population)
- Postal code: 58900
- HDI (2007): 0.8536 - high
- C.P 58900: MX-MICH

Santa Ana Maya Municipality is a municipality in the Mexican state of Michoacán, bordering on the state of Guanajuato and Lake Cuitzeo.

== History ==
Santa Ana Maya's population origins are pre-Hispanic. The ancient name of Santa Ana Maya: Mayao, is but a syncopation of Mayapequaro "Market Place" as ... It is quite possible then that Santa Ana Maya out instead of barter between Purépecha and Otomi. Santa Ana Maya's more important headings of capital are, remittances, farming, carpentry, and others with less importance. Its main attractions are the two fairs, one is celebrated on the month of February (9 to 19), and the other is on the month of July (17 to 26).

Mayor Ygnacio López Mendoza was murdered in November 2013.

== Localities ==
Several small towns pertain to it: Huacao, La Lobera, Rancho Nuevo, El Cuervo, La Ladera, Potzundareo, San Rafael, El Toronjo, La Mesa Rica, La Colonia, and the largest is the town of Santa Ana Maya.
