= Cortazar, Guanajuato =

City and municipality in Guanajuato, Mexico

Cortazar
- City and municipality
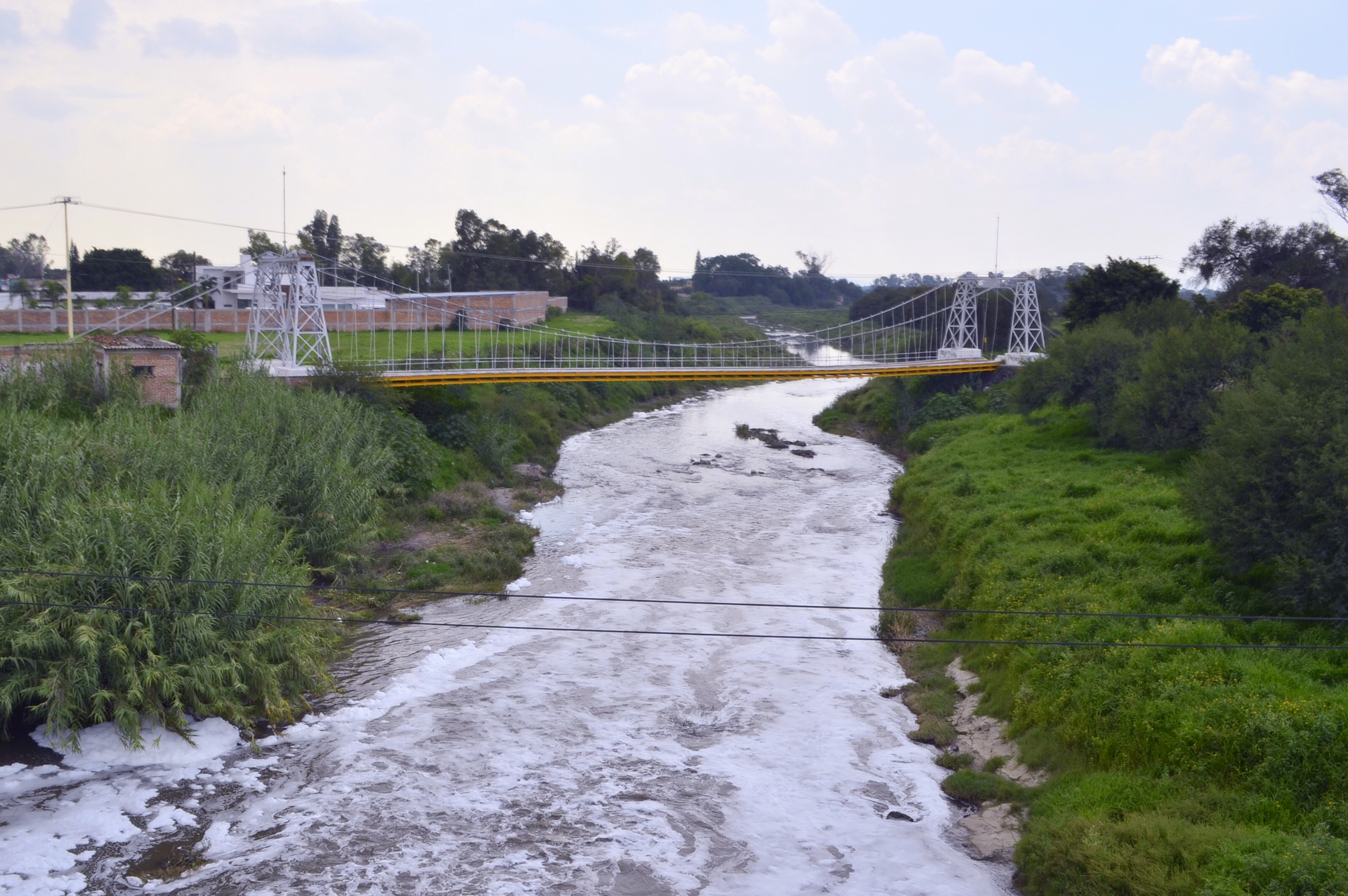

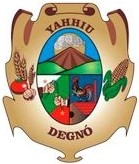
- Coat of arms

- Location in Guanajuato Cortazar (Mexico)
- Coordinates: 20.48302°N 100.96316°W
- Country: Mexico
- State: Guanajuato

Area
  - City: 10.29 km^{2} (3.97 sq mi)
  - Municipality: 335.2 km^{2} (129.4 sq mi)

Population (2020 census)
  - City: 69,371
  - Density: 6,742/km^{2} (17,460/sq mi)
  - Municipality: 97,928
  - Municipality density: 292.1/km^{2} (756.7/sq mi)

Cortazar is a city and its surrounding municipality located in the southeastern quadrant of the state of Guanajuato in Mexico. It is bordered to the north by Villagrán, to the north and east by Celaya, to the southeast by Tarimoro, to the south by Salvatierra, and to the west by Jaral del Progreso and Salamanca. The city had a 2005 census population of 57,748, while the municipality had a population of 83,175. The municipality has an area of 335.2 km^{2} (129.4 sq mi) and includes many smaller outlying communities, the largest of which are Tierra Fría to the west and La Cañada de Caracheo to the south.

In pre-Columbian times the region was inhabited primarily by Otomí and Nahuas people. Founded in 1721 by Franciscan friars, the village of San José de los Amoles was under the order of the congress of Guanajuato given the present name of Cortázar in 1857 after Luis Cortazar y Rábago, a Mexican patriot and leader of Mexico's war of independence against Spain.

The municipal president of the city and its microregions is Elías Ruiz Ramírez of the National Action Party, since 2009.
