= San Antonio Tariácuri =

Coordinates: 19°52′50″N 101°44′50″W

San Antonio Tariácuri is a small town located in the northern part of the Mexican state of Michoacan de Ocampo. Named after both St. Anthony of Padua from the Roman Catholic Church and the Purepechan Emperor Tariácuri who unified the Purépecha Empire.

Geographical coordinates: 19° 52.825 North, 101° 44.956 West.

As Michoacan de Ocampo is geographically divided into 113 important cities, Tariácuri belongs to the one named Zacapu that means "Place made out of Stone" pointed to be the origin of the Purepechan Empire.
