= Marroquín =

Marroquín is a Spanish European surname of Basque origin, associated with the Salcedo lineage from the Basque Country in northern Spain. The Marroquín surname originates from Zalla, in the province of Biscay (less than 15 km west of the city of Bilbao, in the Basque Country, northern Spain).

It means "Moroccan". Due to being a nickname for Sancho Ortiz. After being held in Morocco and returning to Spain.

The surname Marroquín is found in Spain and Latin America among its descendants.

== Origin of the Marroquín Surname ==
The surname Marroquín originates from Sancho Ortiz, a European Basque nobleman of the early 13th century, whose life gave rise to a lineage rooted in the Señorío de Vizcaya. Born around 1190 in Montehermoso, Salcedo (modern-day Zalla, in the Basque region of Spain), Sancho was the natural son of Fortún Sánchez de Salcedo, a feudal lord of the powerful Ayala and Salcedo lineages.

As a young man, Sancho entered the service of Diego López II de Haro, Lord of Vizcaya. During this period, he accompanied his lord on an expedition to Marruecos (Morocco) around 1205–1210, either as part of a diplomatic mission or a military campaign. There, he was left behind as a hostage to guarantee the fulfillment of agreements between the Christian delegation and local Muslim authorities.

Upon returning to Biscay, Sancho Ortiz received the nickname "el Marroquín" (meaning "the Moroccan") in reference to his extended captivity or stay in North Africa. This epithet eventually became a hereditary surname, passed down through his descendants, thereby establishing the Marroquín lineage.

Sancho distinguished himself during the Battle of Las Navas de Tolosa in 1212, a key event in the Christian Reconquista. As recognition for his service, he was granted rights over the monasteries of San Julián de Musques and San Román de Cierbana, as well as privileges over the port of Somorrostro, located in what is now Biscay.

Although he lived primarily in Somorrostro, he established the Casa solariega de Montehermoso de Salcedo, which became the cradle of the Marroquín lineage. Sancho contracted multiple marriages — with María Ortiz, María Sánchez de Muñatones, and Juana de Varazaldo — and had both legitimate and illegitimate children.

Through his bastard son Diego Sánchez Marroquín, and later his grandson Sancho Ortiz Marroquín, the surname was preserved and spread through future generations. While the main Ayala-Salcedo lineage continued through legitimate heirs, the Marroquín name flourished through the collateral branches.

During the late Middle Ages, the Marroquín family participated in the regional conflicts known as the guerras de banderías and occupied local administrative posts such as Merinos and Corregidores.

In the centuries that followed, the surname migrated beyond the Iberian Peninsula during the Spanish colonial expansion, becoming established in the Americas — particularly in Mexico, Guatemala, and other regions of New Spain.

== Hidalgüía ==
Several branches of the Marroquín lineage were recognized as hidalgos de sangre, a category of hereditary nobility that did not necessarily imply noble titles, but did recognize purity of blood and tax-exempt rights. Genealogical and legal documentation preserved in the archives of the Chancelleries of Valladolid and Granada, as well as in the Council of Military Orders, record hidalguía lawsuits presented and won by individuals with this surname during the 16th and 17th centuries.

== Arrival in America ==
Early emigration (16th–17th centuries) During the viceregal period, some Basques with the surname Marroquín, originating from the provinces of Álava, Biscay, and Navarra, embarked to America from the ports of Sanlúcar de Barrameda, Sevilla, and Pasajes.

=== Main Settlements ===
Mexico (New Spain).

Colombia (New Granada).

Captaincy General of Guatemala.

Peru.

Chile.

Argentina.

== Branch of the Marroquín Family Admitted into Military Orders (Spain, 16th–18th Centuries) ==
Elevation through Chivalric Nobility

To be admitted into the Military Orders of Santiago, Calatrava, Alcántara, or Montesa, candidates were required to present irrefutable proof of noble blood, demonstrating purity through all four ancestral lines (limpieza de cuatro costados).

Some individuals bearing the surname Marroquín successfully entered these orders, which automatically elevated them above the status of the common hidalgo.

Membership in a Military Order conferred the treatment of caballero, social preeminence, and access to revenues and administrative offices that were otherwise restricted to higher nobility.

This form of social ascension constituted a semi-hereditary military nobility — superior in legal and social rank to a standard hidalgo, although lacking a formal hereditary noble title.

== Notable People with This Surname ==
- José Manuel Marroquín (1827–1908), Colombian writer, humanist, statesman, journalist, and politician. He was President of Colombia from July 31, 1900, to August 7, 1904.
- Francisco Marroquín (1499–1563), born in Cantabria, Spain. After graduating in Philosophy and Theology, he met conquistador Pedro de Alvarado, with whom he traveled to New Spain in 1530. He became the first bishop of Guatemala and a translator of Central American languages.
- Clemente Marroquín Rojas, an influential Guatemalan journalist who founded the newspaper "La Hora" and fought for freedom of expression
- Agustín Marroquín (1774–1811), Creole bullfighter and a famous criminal of his time, participant in the early stage of the Mexican War of Independence.
- Bianca Marroquín Theater actress known for her work on Broadway
- Alejandro Marroquín (1911–1977), Salvadoran anthropologist.
- Alfredo Sánchez Marroquín (1910–2000), Mexican chemist, researcher, professor, and academic.
