= Laura Salguero =

Spanish footballer (born 1978)

Personal information
- Full name: Laura Salguero López
- Date of birth: 21 December 1978 (age 47)
- Place of birth: Majadahonda, Spain
- Position: Striker

Senior career*
Years	Team	Apps	(Gls)
- Rayo Majadahonda
- Madrid Oeste
- Pozuelo
2001–2003	Estudiantes Huelva		
2003–2006	Torrejón		
2006–2009	Atlético Madrid		

International career
- Spain
- * Club domestic league appearances and goals

Laura Salguero López is a former football striker. She played for CF Pozuelo, Estudiantes Huelva, AD Torrejón and Atlético Madrid in the Spanish First Division.

She was a member of the Spanish national team in the 1999 World Cup qualifying.
