= San José Huipana =

The town of San José Huipana is in the north of the Mexican state of Michoacán. It is located at 20°3′18″N 101°18′46″W. The population is 3,300.

The name of Huipana means "place wolves cave or coyote burrow" in the Purépecha language.
