= Pabellón de Hidalgo =

Town in Rincón de Romos Municipality, Aguascalientes

- City
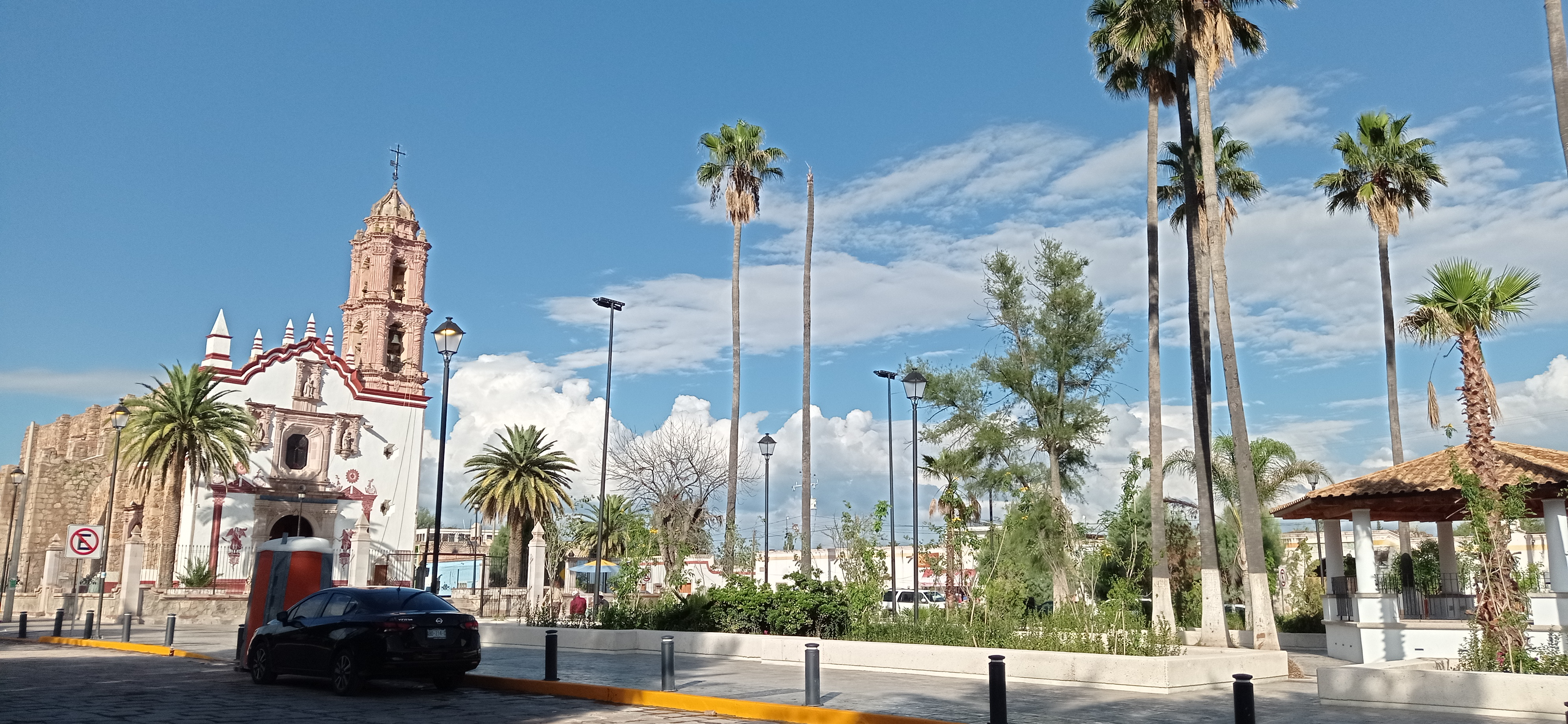
- Parroquia de Nuestro Señor de San Blas and Main Square of Pabellón de Hidalgo

- Location in Mexico Pabellón de Hidalgo (Mexico)
- Coordinates: 22°10′28″N 102°20′28″W
- Country: Mexico
- State: Aguascalientes
- Municipality: Rincón de Romos
- Founded: 1597–1601

Population (2020)
  - Total: 4,630

Pabellón de Hidalgo is a town of 4,630 (2020) inhabitants in the municipality of Rincón de Romos, Aguascalientes, Mexico. In 2023, Pabellón de Hidalgo was designated a Pueblo Mágico by the Mexican government, recognizing its cultural and historical importance.

It's said that after the defeat of the rebels at the Battle of Calderón Bridge, they arrived at the Hacienda de San Blas in Pabellón de Hidalgo and removed Miguel Hidalgo y Costilla from command. On June 27, 2023, it is named with the title of Pueblo Mágico by the Secretariat of Tourism, along with 45 other towns in Mexico.

== Museum of the Insurgency ==
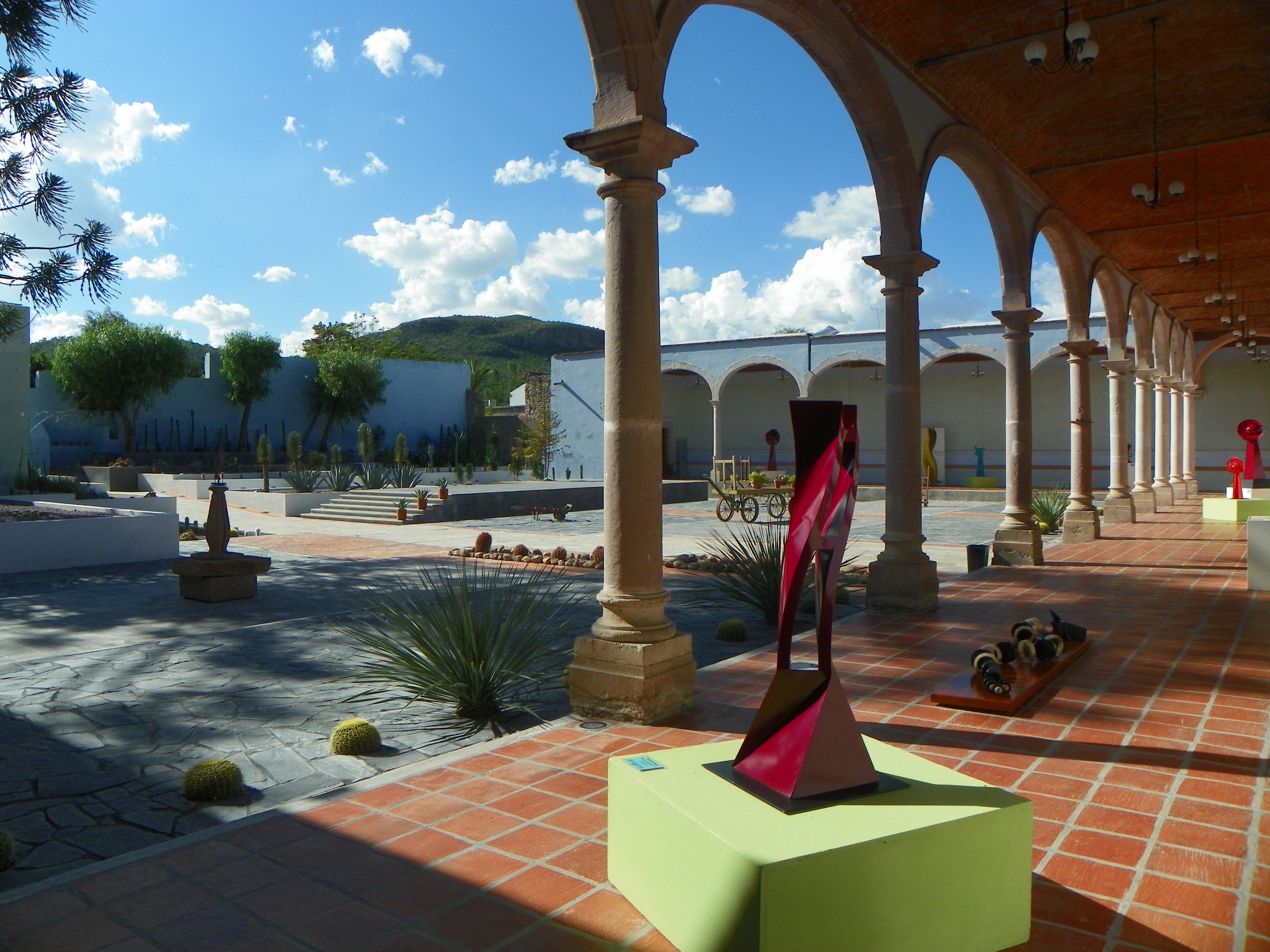
Hacienda de San Blas, in the town of Pabellón de Hidalgo, is a 16th-century hacienda, now maintained as the Museum of the Insurgency. It is a good example of the agricultural haciendas that fed the Camino Real de Tierra Adentro.

The Museum of the Insurgency operates in what was formerly the Hacienda de San Blas. The museum opened on 17 October 1967 to commemorate events that took place during the independence of Mexico. It also houses murals by Alfredo Flores Zermeno, depicting cultural, political and social events of the last two centuries (1810-2010) in Mexico.

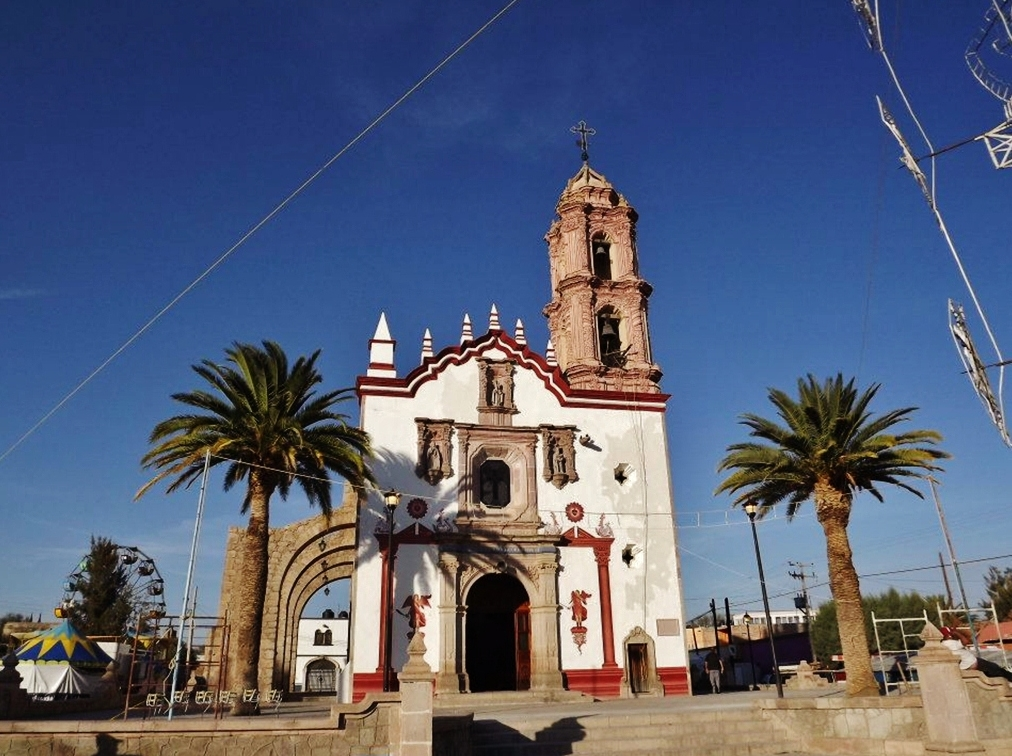
Plaza de Pabellón de Hidalgo, where you can see the Templo de San Blas en Pabellón de Hidalgo, in the town of Pabellón de Hidalgo, Aguascalientes.

The Museum is located on the western side of Plaza 24 de Enero Nº19. The Templo de San Blas en Pabellón de Hidalgo is located on the northern side of the plaza.
