= Salguero =

Salguero is a surname. Notable people with the surname include:

- Carlos Salguero (1955–2006), Argentine footballer
- Cassandra Salguero (2003–2024), Mexican beach soccer player
- Elizabeth Salguero (born 1964), Bolivian politician
- Felipe Salguero, Mexican professional boxer
- Gabriel Salguero, Argentinian footballer
- Gerónimo Salguero (1774—1847), Argentine statesman and lawyer
- Gloria Salguero Gross (1941–2015), Salvadoran politician and businesswoman
- Gustavo Adolfo Espina Salguero (1946—2024), Guatemalan politician
- José Antonio Salguero (born 1960), Spanish footballer
- Laura Salguero (born 1978), Spanish footballer
- Olinda Salguero (born 1984), Guatemalan activist
- Rafael Salguero (born 1946), Guatemalan football administrator
- Salvador Salguero (swimmer) (born 1967), Salvadoran swimmer
- Armando Salguero (born 1962), Cuban-American journalist
