= Rincón de Tamayo =

Rincón de Tamayo is a community in the municipality of Celaya, Guanajuato in Mexico. It maintains a relevance with regard to other communities in the municipality of Celaya. Singer Joan Sebastian wrote a song about a girl named Rosa who lived in Rincón de Tamayo. The late Josefina Mancera Martinez was born there in 1931.

== Geographical features ==
Rincón de Tamayo has a population of about 9749 people. It is 1790 meters above sea level. It is surrounded by several hills that are relatively high. Rincón de Tamayo has no territorial extension because it is not a municipality, although people are trying to make it a municipality. There are no other communities that belong to Rincón de Tamayo because it is not a municipality, but it is known as the "reunion" spot for other communities that come to buy goods and study in the schools.

The communities that are near Rincón de Tamayo are: San José el Nuevo, La Machuca, La Cruz, La Luz, Juan Martin, San Lorenzo, El Cuije, El Tajo, Los Mancera, La Máquina, Santa María del Refugio, Las Canoas, Los Huesos and Ojo Seco.

== Schools in the District ==
=== Preschool ===
- Antonio Caso (public)
- Cuauhtemoc (public)
- Rosario Castellanos (public)

=== Elementary ===
- Agustin Yanez (public)
- Anahuac (private)
- Emiliano Zapata (public)
- Juan de la Barrera (public)
- Leandro Valle (public)
- Lic. Jose Lopez Portillo (public)
- Moctezuma (private)
- Vianney (private)
- Jose Maria Morelos (public)

=== Middle and Up ===
- Cecyteg Plantel Rincán de Tamayo (public)
- El Nigromante (private)
- Telesecundaria 206 (public)
- Telesecundaria 421 (public)

=== Demographics ===
Rincón de Tamayo has a population of about 9749 people. Of that 4564 are male and 5185 are female. There are 5787 residents that are above the age of 18. 955 of those are 60 and older. The average amount of school attended by the people of Rincón de Tamayo is about 4 years and 1008 people have a little over post-basic education. Of the inhabitants that are 15 years or older, about 803 are illiterate.

=== Economy and Quality of Life ===
There are a total of 2332 homes in Rincón de Tamayo. Of those homes, 2254 are normal homes or apartments. 107 homes have dirt floors and 75 consist of only one room. 2120 homes are connected to public sanitation. 2180 homes have electricity, 214 have 1 or more computers, 1569 have a washing machine, and 2150 have at least 1 television. (Info from 2005 census)
