= San Juan de la Vega =

Town in Guanajuato, Mexico

Coordinates: 20°38′N 100°46′W

- Locality
- Interactive map of San Juan de la Vega
- Country: Mexico
- State: Guanajuato
- Municipality: Celaya
- Elevation: 1,778 m (5,833 ft)

Population (2010)
  - Total: 9,597

San Juan de la Vega is a town in the state of Guanajuato, Mexico.

The town has been inhabited since at least the 16th century. It has grown considerably in the past few years, and currently has two Catholic churches. During the weekends, there is an open market in the town square call "El Jardin" where local people sell items such as plants, clothing, shoes, fresh fruit and vegetables. It is a known producer of carrots, jícama and cereals. This town is about 15–20 minutes from Celaya. They hold an annual celebration celebrating their patron saint San Juan Bautista which the town is named after. They take the saint to walk around the whole town and each year a house is in charge of the saint.

== Festival of the Exploding Hammers ==
San Juan de la Vega is most noted for its unique exploding sledgehammer festival as a tribute to "San Juanito", which takes place every February. Locals affix homemade explosives to heads of hammers. The explosives were made with matches, sulfur and fireworks. Attaching a mix of sulphur and chlorate to the ends of sledge hammers which they then smash against rail beams. Today, this is mainly done in a field outside the town.

The celebration stems from the 17th century when the town’s namesake, considered “Mexico’s Robin Hood”, battled with the area’s wealthy landowners. The modern day celebration is a reenactment of this skirmish. Despite the concern of several groups and calls to end the tradition, the festival has continued for over 300 years.

In 2020, the festival led to 43 injuries.
