= Milpillas de Allende =

Milpillas de Allende, Zacatecas
- Town
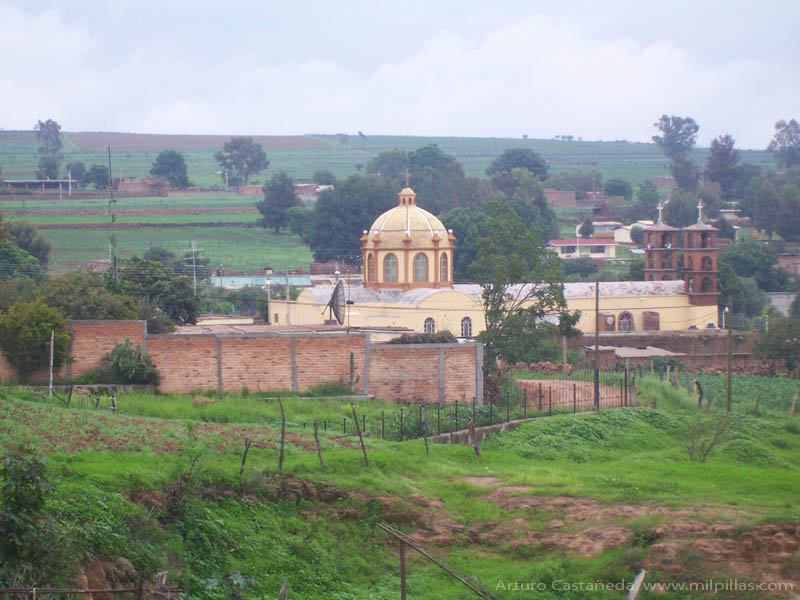
- Nickname: Tierra colorada
- Location within Zacatecas Location within Mexico
- Coordinates: 21°19′33″N 103°36′54″W
- Country: Mexico
- State: Zacatecas
- Municipality: Teúl de González Ortega
- Elevation: 1,911 m (6,270 ft)
- Time zone: UTC-6 (CST)
- Postal code: 99820
- Area code: 467
- Website: http://www.milpillas.com

Milpillas de Allende is a town in the municipality of Teúl de González Ortega in the south Zacatecas in Mexico. People of this singular town grow corn and blue agave in peculiar red soil, and also engage in cattle ranching.

The most important building structure of the town, is without a doubt the church in the name of San José (Saint Joseph). Its colorful fiesta on his honor is celebrated annually around the second week of January. Other important buildings include the lienzo charro and soccer field with artificial turf and several spectator seating rows that was inaugurated in January 2016

The name of the town is a result of the union of: Milpillas (cornfields) and Allende, the last name of Ignacio Allende. The original name was San Jose de Milpillas, in honor of the town’s patron saint. However, by the 1950 government census the town appears with the name Milpillas de Allende.

== History ==
Before the conquest of Mexico, this region was inhabited by native Indians, the Caxcan. On July 16, 1688, Alonso de Zevallos Villa Gutiérrez, governor of New Galicia, granted Pedro Castañeda the lands where the town now stands by royal decree. Pedro Castañeda's real name was Pedro de Vargas Castañeda, and of the 32 surnames that have confirmed the genetic mosaic, the first and founding ones are: Vargas Castañeda, López, Del Muro, Flores, Ramírez, Ulloa, Navarro, and Saldaña; then in the 19th century arrived the following: Gutiérrez, Rivas, Barrera, Montes, Acosta, Covarrubias, Ortiz, Montes, Valdés, Arjona, Paulín, Rodríguez, Román, and others; from the 20th century are the Arellano, Sandoval, and others.

== Description Geography ==
The town is located in the south of the state of Zacatecas, east of the Sierra Madre Occidental. Its geographic coordinates, according to the INEGI (National Institute of Statistics and Geography), are 21°19′31″ north latitude and 103°36′50″ west longitude, at an altitude of 1,900 meters above sea level. It borders the municipality of Florencia de Benito Juárez to the north, Huitzila to the south, García de la Cadena to the east, and the state of Jalisco to the west.

=== Education ===
According to the 2000 census, 432 people are literate. The town has a kindergarten, primary and secondary schools, and a high school. Milpillas de Allende had the highest educational completion rate in Mexico. In 1991, it already had 250 professionals with a population of 2,000. Illiteracy was eradicated in 1942, and its Fray Bartolomé de las Casas primary school was the most important for its academic results and the prestige it enjoyed from before 1930 until the end of the 20th century.

== Climate ==
The weather is semi-arid without a well defined spring station. The land allows the growth of crop well under drought conditions. It rains about 4 months of the year. Jun – September. This time of year is well known as "Las Aguas", which means "the waters". Its red soil gives it a nickname. Tierra Colorada. When it rains, the water is red like the soil.

== Climate ==
Climate data for Milpillas De Allende (1951–2010)
Month	Jan	Feb	Mar	Apr	May	Jun	Jul	Aug	Sep	Oct	Nov	Dec	Year
Record high °C (°F)	29.0 (84.2)	31.0 (87.8)	37.0 (98.6)	36.0 (96.8)	35.0 (95.0)	39.0 (102.2)	32.5 (90.5)	35.0 (95.0)	31.0 (87.8)	29.5 (85.1)	29.0 (84.2)	28.0 (82.4)	39.0 (102.2)
Mean daily maximum °C (°F)	20.9 (69.6)	22.5 (72.5)	24.9 (76.8)	27.2 (81.0)	29.2 (84.6)	27.3 (81.1)	24.2 (75.6)	24.5 (76.1)	24.1 (75.4)	24.1 (75.4)	23.2 (73.8)	21.6 (70.9)	24.5 (76.1)
Daily mean °C (°F)	12.5 (54.5)	13.8 (56.8)	15.7 (60.3)	17.8 (64.0)	19.8 (67.6)	19.2 (66.6)	17.7 (63.9)	17.9 (64.2)	17.5 (63.5)	16.8 (62.2)	14.7 (58.5)	13.2 (55.8)	16.4 (61.5)
Mean daily minimum °C (°F)	4.0 (39.2)	5.1 (41.2)	6.5 (43.7)	8.4 (47.1)	10.5 (50.9)	11.0 (51.8)	11.1 (52.0)	11.2 (52.2)	11.0 (51.8)	9.5 (49.1)	6.2 (43.2)	4.8 (40.6)	8.3 (46.9)
Record low °C (°F)	−5.0 (23.0)	−5.0 (23.0)	−1.5 (29.3)	2.5 (36.5)	2.5 (36.5)	4.0 (39.2)	2.0 (35.6)	2.5 (36.5)	3.5 (38.3)	1.0 (33.8)	−5.0 (23.0)	−9.0 (15.8)	−9.0 (15.8)
Average precipitation mm (inches)	24.0 (0.94)	9.5 (0.37)	3.6 (0.14)	2.8 (0.11)	21.0 (0.83)	151.2 (5.95)	227.1 (8.94)	183.2 (7.21)	133.9 (5.27)	55.8 (2.20)	13.5 (0.53)	11.6 (0.46)	837.2 (32.96)
Average precipitation days (≥ 0.1 mm)	2.5	1.4	0.6	0.6	2.9	14.9	20.8	18.4	15.2	7.2	1.9	2.3	88.7
Source: Servicio Meteorologico Nacional

== Communication ==
It offers telephone, mail, radio, television, and internet services. It is connected by the Guadalajara-Colotlán highway. It also has several roads.

== Demographic and Economy ==
According to the Second Population and Housing Census, the town has 606 inhabitants, 50% of whom are men and 50% women. The town has 303 homes, 111 of which are uninhabited. They are built with brick, adobe, and tile.

10.12% of the population is economically active. The population is primarily engaged in the cultivation of corn, beans, and blue agave, and in livestock farming.

== See also ==
- Huitzila (Zacatecas)
