= Los Otates =

Otates
- Town
- Los Otates
- Coat of arms

- Location within Mexico
- Coordinates: 19°31′13″N 96°42′54″W
- Country: Mexico
- State: Veracruz
- Founded: 1743
- Elevation: 540 m (1,770 ft)

Population (2020)
  - Total: 1,036
- Time zone: UTC-6 (Central Standard Time)
  - Summer (DST): UTC-5
- Postal code: 91485

Los Otates is a Mexican city in the Actopan municipality, in the state of Veracruz, Mexico.

== Location ==
The town of Los Otates, is located in the municipality of Actopan, in the central Veracruz state, its coordinates are 19° 31' 13.36" north of latitude and 96° 42' 54.87" west, and is at 540 meters above sea level. It has 1174 inhabitants (2006 census), of which 94% of the population is Catholic, 4% other religions and 2% belongs to none.

Los Otates has all public services, drinking water, street lighting, garbage collection, paving, health center, church, library, cellular telephone service, public transport, schools and recreation areas.

== History ==
In ancient times, Los Otates was inhabited by a group of Totonacas. Archaeological remains have been found in la Capilla. Many of these archaeological pieces are made of ceramic (pottery) and obsidian stone (spears).

In colonial times, in 1579 Xalapa neighbor Sebastian Diaz requested of the viceroy to acquire a ranch for beef cattle in the region of Chicu, Actopan and Atexcan. In 1600 this ranch was donated to Paul Gutierrez, Tecamachalco neighbor and later power passed to Don Roque de Cevallos Gutierrez, owner of Trapiche de la Concepcion (La Concha). Roque's heirs brought the ranch into bankruptcy as a result of loans from the church, drought, diseases and death of slaves and cattle.

In 1692 the Holy Inquisition court recovered all assets of the mill of the Conception and it passed into the hands of the nuns of the convent of San Jeronimo in the city of Puebla. That same year Don Francisco Dominguez Muniz acquired this property, among others, to be used as a site for livestock called Cañada de los Otates.

The Dominguez family retained the property until the grandchildren of Francisco Dominguez divided up their inheritance and each sold his share, except Catarina de la Oliva Dominguez who is left her part of about half site to the people who worked on the Otates estate.

People with the surnames Palmeros, Barradas, Ortiz and others who disappeared from the area, were Spanish descendants. Later other surnames entered the area: Salazar, Rodriguez, Ávila, Lopez, Callejas, among others. All of these are surnames of families that currently make up the Otates population.

By 1899, owing to reform laws, the government took control of the land and awarded Los Otates to Don Ortega Crescencio. Upon Crescencio's death the people at that time bought the field from his widow for $250. Don Juan Barradas, José Salazar and Don Jose de la Paz Avila came up with this sum.

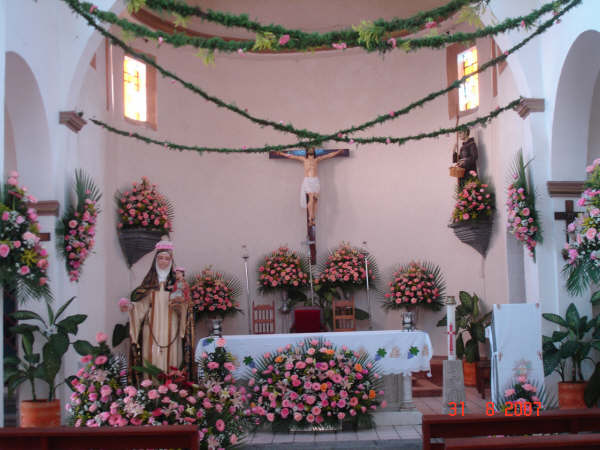
Church of Santa Rosa de Lima.

== Religion ==
The church was built in 1766 and resembled a wooden shrine. It also has the oldest bell.

Later on and after the death of Catherine the people built a concrete chapel with tiled-roof. The tower was built in 1879 and extended in 1945 and 1946. The domes were also built. In 1973 Santa Rosa de Lima was named as its patron saint.

In the early 1990s the church was remodeled preserving the original facade. Besides Otates, the priest also served the Trapiche del Rosario, San Nicolas, Omiquila, Los Frailes, El Zetal, Coyolillo and Bureau of Guadalupe congregations, among others.

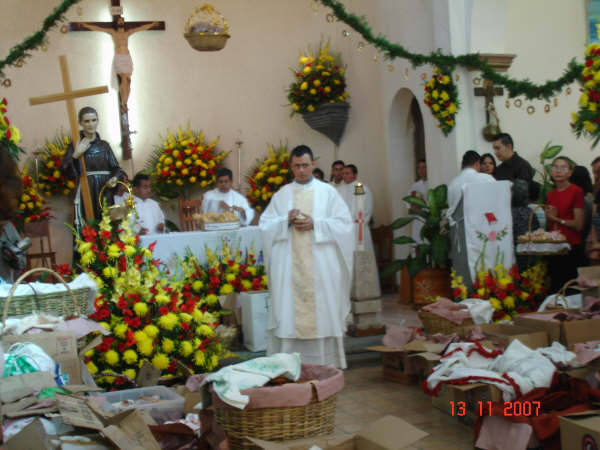
Blessing of Bread, in 2007, Otates.

Since 1738 a feast has been celebrated every August 30 in honor of Santa Rosa de Lima, the patron saint. This date is also celebrated as heritage day for the land which used to belong to Catherine de la Oliva Dominguez.

November 13 is also celebrated as the feast of bread in honor of San Diego de Alcalá, a celebration that has gained a lot of popularity over the years given the large amount of bread that is prepared to share with family and friends.

== Education ==
The first school was built around 1870 and served the community for a long time. In 1973 the new elementary school classroom was built and its first entrants graduated in 1976. By 1977 a High-school was opened, its construction having begun in 1974. In 1975 the school began its Bachillerato program in a provisional building that was previously used as a public laundry.

By 1977, the Otates Public Library was established and on occasions it provided training in tailoring, baking, pastry making and fruit growing, among others. Previously the kindergarten had been started in 1983, the institution having been previously built and later inaugurated on 19 September 1985.

In 2006 the process to relocate Bachillerato program was started and it is currently being in a school building close to the secondary school.

== Other facilities ==
The cemetery was built around 1970 and the health center in 1976.

== Tourist attractions ==
=== The Descabezadero ===
This is the source of the Actopan river. It is a beautiful place, full of vegetation and fauna, where the river flows over a cliff. Visitors can descend the cliff while rafting and abseiling (rappelling). The river empties into the Gulf of Mexico at Chachalacas.

=== Poza Azul ===
This is a "lake" of very clear blue water, from which a small river flows, which connects to the Actopan River 1.5 km downstream.

=== The Chapel ===
The Chapel is located in the mountain close to Los Otates. The first stone for its construction was laid on 1 November 1902 and it was completed in 1907. In around 1945 there was a fire in the area which burned the wood structure and the tile roof. During the rebuilding the temple was also extended. This chapel was built to serve as a school run by the Missionaries of St Joseph. During the revolution the missionaries had to leave and did not return.

== Agriculture ==
Los Otates' agriculture is based on the production of mango and chayote (also known as christophene, cho-cho) for sale within Mexico as well as exported internationally. Other crops such as tomatoes, maize, beans and sugarcane are produced to a lesser extent.

On the drive leading into Los Otates large fields with all kinds crops are visible.

== Flora and fauna ==
There is a wide variety of flora in Los Otates. "Patancan" cactus, "nacasle" (nacastle), acacia, tamarisk and mango in addition to some fine woods such as cedar, mahogany and a variety of mangroves are present. There are various types of birds such as quail, calandria, torcacita (tortolita), owl, zopilote, paloma, chachalaca, sparrowhawk, among others. There is also a wide variety of wildlife animals, including different kinds of snakes such as the bell, and the serpiente coral (coralillo), a large population of rabbits, raccoons, false coral, nauyaca, lizards, iguana and others.
