= Cañada, Guanajuato =

Town in Cortazar, Guanajuato, Mexico

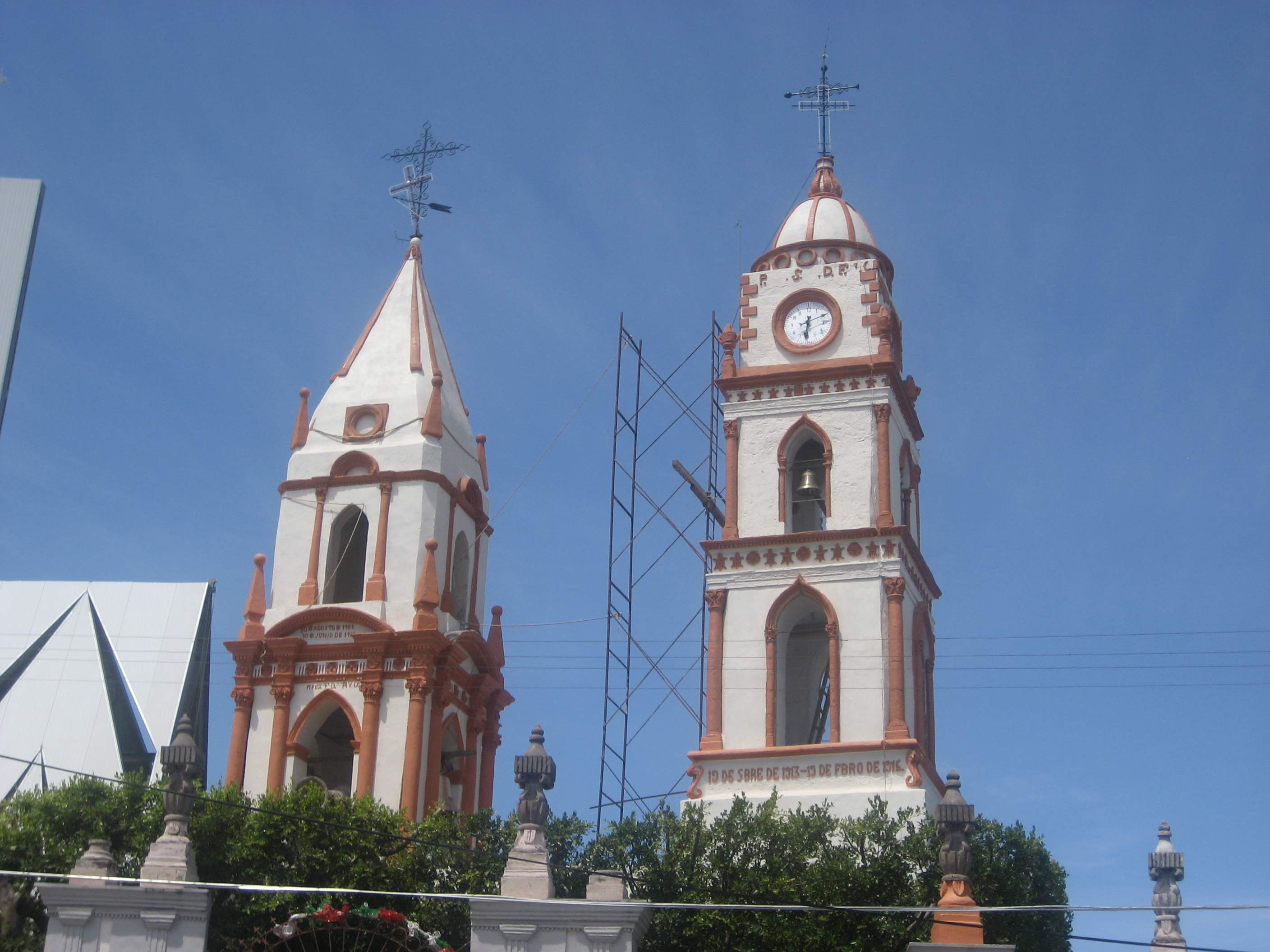
Nuestra Señora de los Dolores Parish

La Cañada (officially known as Cañada de Caracheo) is a small town in the municipality of Cortazar, in the state of Guanajuato, Mexico. City elevation is 1 mile (5643 feet) above sea level; with a population of about 2,400. Founded in 1612, La Cañada lies between the hills of La Gavia and El Culiacán. The word Cañada refers to the Spanish word for land between two elevated bodies of the earth; Caracheo comes from the Purépecha word carachi, which means dried water.

The Fiesta del Padre Nieves is held every March 10 and the Fiesta de La Virgen de los Dolores starting a week before Easter Sunday, and running from Thursday 12 pm to Monday 6 am, with festivities throughout the year including the Novenas during the summer, Dia del Joven, Fiestas Patrias, and November 11 to commemorate the beatification of Fray Elías del Socorro Nieves in the Vatican. (Cañada de Caracheo has its own saint.)
