= Villa Jiménez =

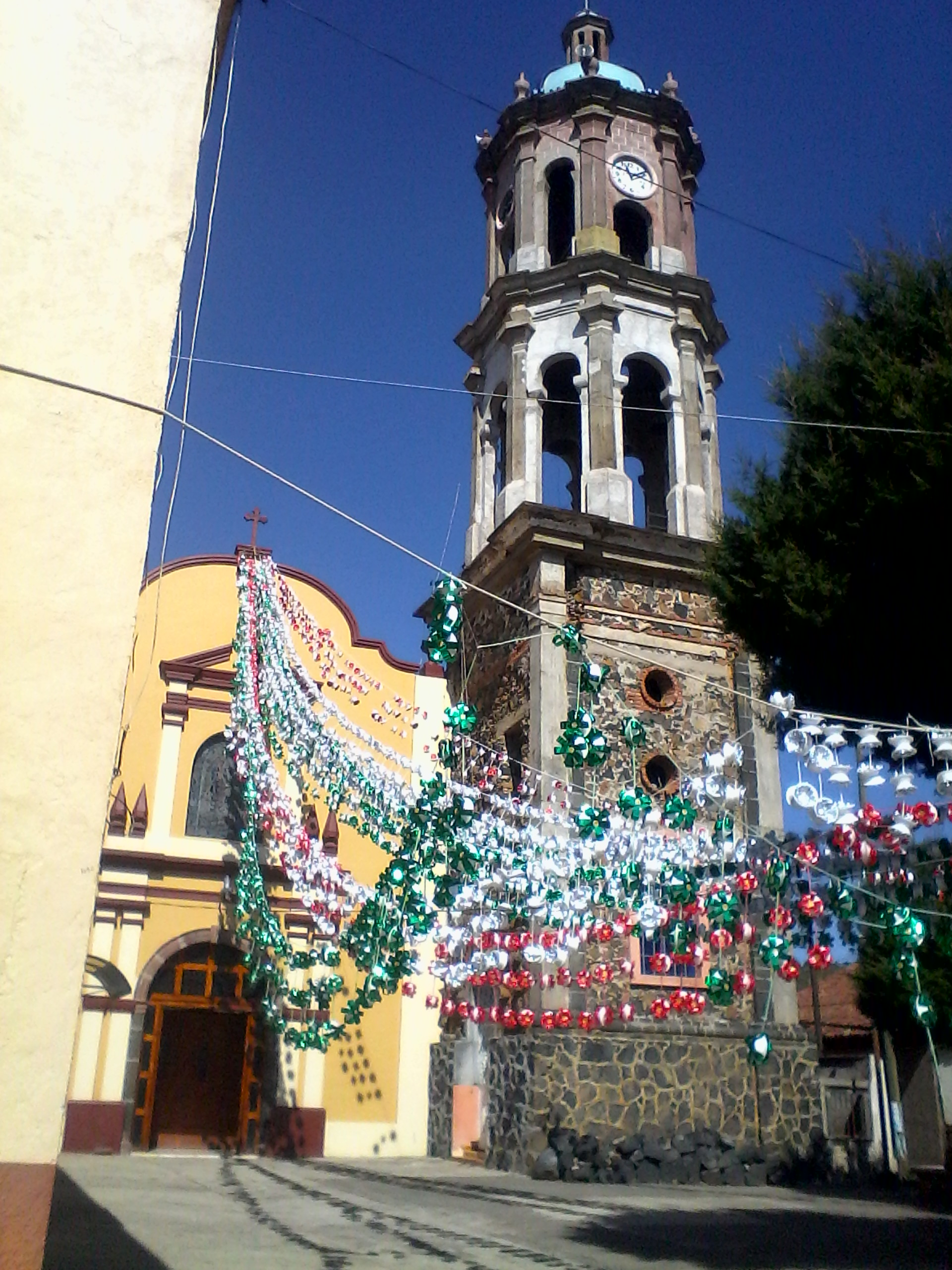
- Temple in Caurio de Guadalupe, Jiménez

- Location in Michoacán and Mexico Villa Jiménez (Mexico)
- Coordinates: 19°55′20″N 101°44′57″W
- Country: Mexico
- State: Michoacán
- Municipality: Jiménez

Area
  - Total: 2.444 km^{2} (0.944 sq mi)
- Elevation (of seat): 2,006 m (6,581 ft)

Population (2020 Census)
  - Total: 3,974
  - Density: 1,626/km^{2} (4,211/sq mi)
- Time zone: UTC-6 (Central)
  - Summer (DST): UTC-5 (Central)
- Postal codes: 58784
- Area code: 454
- Website: Official website

Villa Jiménez is a town and the municipal seat of the municipality of Jiménez in the Mexican state of Michoacán.

It is located 97 km (60 mi) from the Morelia, at a height of 2006 meters above sea level.

== History ==
In the mid-19th century, stagecoaches running between Zamora and Morelia forded the Ángulo River at what is now Villa de Jiménez. A man named Patrocinio Aguilar lived there and supplied travellers with provisions, so that the place became known as Vado de Aguilar ("Aguilar's Ford"). On May 30, 1910, the settlement was granted the status of a town (villa) and renamed after Mariano Jiménez, governor of Michoacán from 1885 to 1892.

== Demographics ==
The population of Villa Jiménez has 3,974 inhabitants, which represents an average decrease of -0.68% per year in the period 2010-2020 based on the 4,249 inhabitants registered in the previous census. As of 2020, the density of the town was 1,626 inhabitants/km².

== Economy ==
The main economic activity in Jiménez is agriculture. Corn is the main crop, followed by sorghum and forage oats. Chicken, cattle and pigs are also raised.

== Climate ==
Climate data for Villa Jiménez (1991–2020 normals, extremes 1981–present)
Month	Jan	Feb	Mar	Apr	May	Jun	Jul	Aug	Sep	Oct	Nov	Dec	Year
Record high °C (°F)	31.5 (88.7)	33 (91)	35 (95)	39 (102)	39 (102)	37 (99)	31 (88)	30 (86)	35 (95)	32 (90)	31.8 (89.2)	32 (90)	39 (102)
Mean daily maximum °C (°F)	23.5 (74.3)	25.6 (78.1)	27.7 (81.9)	29.7 (85.5)	30.3 (86.5)	28.1 (82.6)	25.7 (78.3)	25.5 (77.9)	25.3 (77.5)	25.3 (77.5)	24.6 (76.3)	23.9 (75.0)	26.3 (79.3)
Daily mean °C (°F)	13.0 (55.4)	14.8 (58.6)	16.6 (61.9)	18.7 (65.7)	20.5 (68.9)	20.4 (68.7)	19.0 (66.2)	18.7 (65.7)	18.5 (65.3)	17.1 (62.8)	14.9 (58.8)	13.4 (56.1)	17.1 (62.8)
Mean daily minimum °C (°F)	2.6 (36.7)	4.0 (39.2)	5.6 (42.1)	7.8 (46.0)	10.7 (51.3)	12.8 (55.0)	12.2 (54.0)	11.9 (53.4)	11.8 (53.2)	8.9 (48.0)	5.2 (41.4)	3.0 (37.4)	8.0 (46.4)
Record low °C (°F)	−8 (18)	−6 (21)	−2.5 (27.5)	0.5 (32.9)	1.5 (34.7)	6 (43)	0 (32)	2.5 (36.5)	4 (39)	−3 (27)	−5 (23)	−6 (21)	−8 (18)
Average precipitation mm (inches)	12.4 (0.49)	14.2 (0.56)	14.9 (0.59)	7.3 (0.29)	40.3 (1.59)	140.9 (5.55)	202.7 (7.98)	203.8 (8.02)	163.2 (6.43)	59.2 (2.33)	15.4 (0.61)	9.7 (0.38)	884.0 (34.80)
Average precipitation days	3.2	2.8	2.8	2.7	8.7	17.1	23.3	22.0	18.0	9.4	3.7	2.4	116.1
Source: Servicio Meteorológico Nacional
