= Rascon =

Rascon or Rascón is a surname. Notable people with the surname include:

- Alfred V. Rascon, United States Army soldier and Medal of Honor recipient
- Art Rascon (born 1962), American television news anchor
- Miguel Rascón (born 1972), Mexican guitarist
- Tati Rascón (born 1971), Spanish tennis player
