= Antúnez (name) =

Antúnez is a Spanish patronymic surname derived from the Antonius root name, widely spread in all Latin America countries as a consequence of Spanish colonization. Its Portuguese variant is Antunes. Notable people with this name include the following:

== Nickname ==
- Antúnez, nickname of Jorge Luis García Pérez (born 1964), Cuban activist

== Surname ==
- Alfonso Blanco Antunez (born 1987), Mexican footballer
- Daniel Antúnez (born 1986), American footballer
- Francisco Antúnez (1922–1994), Spanish footballer
- Jesús Antúnez (born 1973), Spanish musician
- José Miguel Antúnez (born 1967), Spanish basketball player
- Julio César Antúnez (born 1956), Uruguayan footballer and manager
- Marcel·lí Antúnez Roca (born 1959), Spanish digital artist
- Nemesio Antúnez (1918–1993), Chilean painter and engraver
- Ricardo Peral Antunez (born 1974), Spanish basketball player
- Santiago Antúnez de Mayolo (1887–1967), Peruvian engineer, physicist and mathematician
