= Pantoja, Guanajuato =

Coordinates: 20.8728°N 100.7892°W

Pantoja is a village in the Mexican state of Guanajuato. It was here that Augustín de Iturbide and Anastasio Bustamante proclaimed the independence of Mexico on 19 March 1821. It is also known as Charco de Pantoja and is in the Valle de Santiago municipality. According to a recent population count it had 1777 inhabitants.

== Sources ==
- entry on Charco de Pantoja
