= Chichimequillas =

Settlement in Querétaro, Mexico

Coordinates: 20°45′00″N 100°20′00″W

Chichimequillas is a village in the Mexican state of Querétaro. It is located in the municipality of El Marqués. It has 3,717 inhabitants and is located at 1970 meters above sea level.

In 2023, Governor Mauricio Kuri González headed the development of State Highway 540 between Chichimequillas and San Vicente Ferrer.

== See also ==
- Hacienda de Chichimequillas
