= Huichihuayan =

- Town
- Location in Mexico Huichihuayan (Mexico)
- Coordinates: 21°28′N 98°58′W
- Country: Mexico
- State: San Luis Potosí
- Municipality: Huehuetlán

Population
  - Total: 2,157
- Time zone: UTC-6 (Zona Centro)
- Postal code: 79890
- Area code: 482

Huichihuayan is a town located in the municipality of Huehuetlán in the southeast region of the Mexican state of San Luis Potosí. With a population of over 2,000, it is the largest town in the municipality.
