= Saldarriaga =

Human settlement in Mexico

Coordinates: 20°37′45″N 100°17′15″W

Saldarriaga is a village in the Mexican state of Querétaro. It is located in the municipality of El Marqués. It has 2,451 inhabitants, and is located at 1,895 meters above sea level.
