= El Fresno =

- municipality
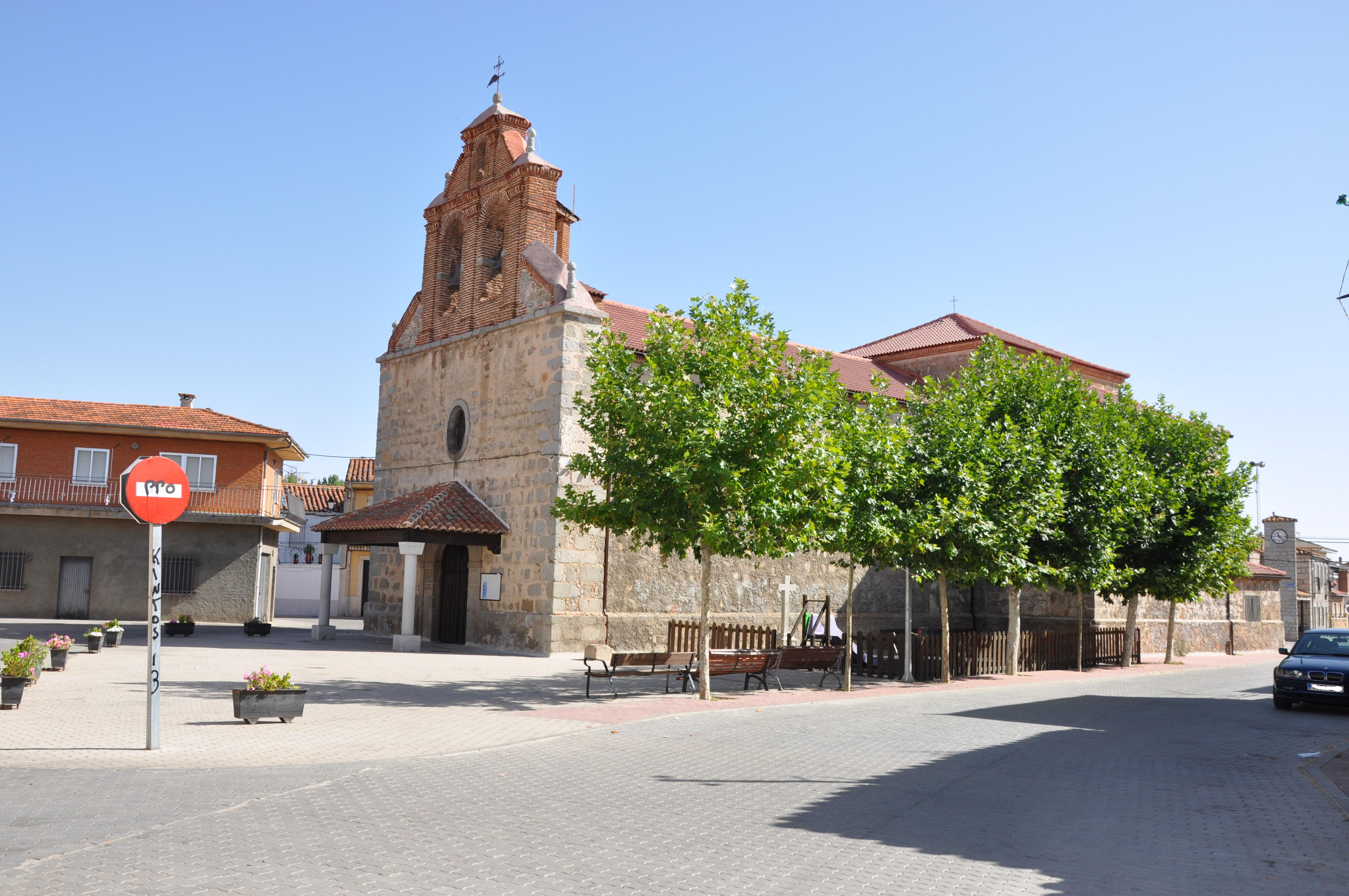
- Church of the Assumption. El Fresno

- Flag Coat of arms

- Location in Spain. El Fresno (Spain)
- Coordinates: 40°36′49″N 4°45′27″W
- Country: Spain
- Autonomous community: Castile and León
- Province: Ávila
- Municipality: El Fresno

Area
  - Total: 12.63 km^{2} (4.88 sq mi)
- Elevation: 1,074 m (3,524 ft)

Population (2025-01-01)
  - Total: 579
  - Density: 45.8/km^{2} (119/sq mi)
- Time zone: UTC+1 (CET)
  - Summer (DST): UTC+2 (CEST)
- Website: Official website

El Fresno is a municipality located in the province of Ávila, Castile and León, Spain.

== Population ==
Historical population
| Year | Pop. | ±% p.a. |
|---|---|---|
| 2023 | 595 | — |
| 2024 | 591 | −0.67% |
| 2025 | 579 | −2.03% |
Source: INE
