= Paso Blanco =

- Location within Panama
- Coordinates: 9°7′48″N 79°13′48″W
- Country: Panama
- Province: Panamá

Population (2008)
  - Total: 3 049

Paso Blanco is a town in the Panamá Province of Panama.

== Sources ==
- World Gazetteer: Panama – World-Gazetteer.com
