= Rancho Nuevo =

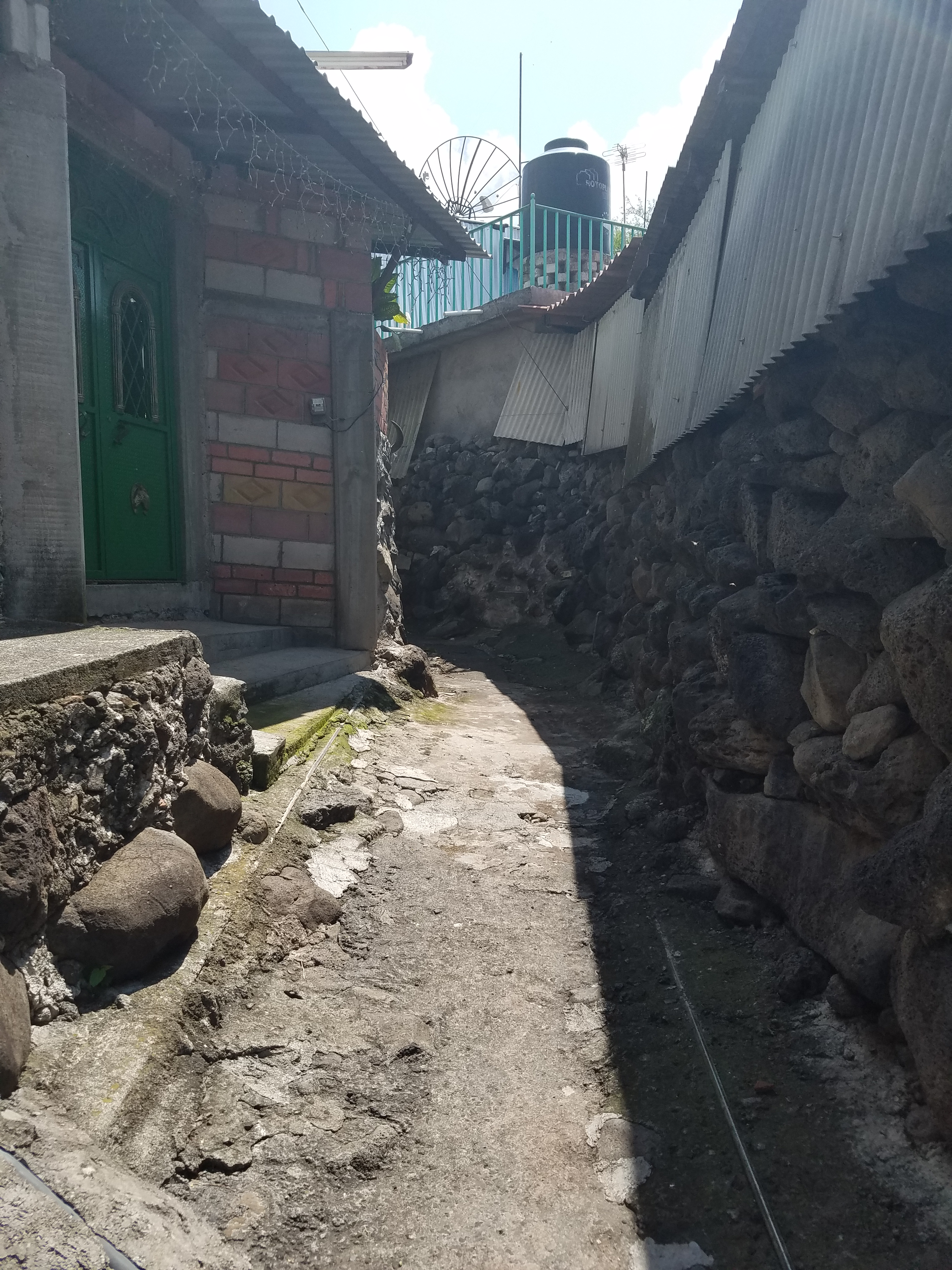
- Walkway through Rancho Nuevo connecting two neighborhoods

- Location within Michoacán Location within Mexico
- Coordinates: 20.064°N 101.061°W

Population
  - Total: 282

Rancho Nuevo is a small Mexican town located off of Av 3 de Mayo, in the state of Michoacán between the Santa Ana Maya Municipality and the state of Guanajuato.

== Geography ==
Its walkways are lined with boulders stacked on one another as fences to navigate through its maze-like mapping. These narrow walkways are what splits up Rancho Nuevo into three neighborhoods with all three having a unique existence. El Cuervo is on the West while on the East, bordering the mountainscape, is called La Remo.

== Name ==
Its original name was Santa Elena de la Cruz, but during the early 1900s, during the Mexican Revolution, it was burnt to the ground. When its citizens started to rebuild their town, nearby neighbors began to call it Rancho Nuevo (The New Ranch). Although the town's name changed, its population, which is in the hundreds, still celebrates the Saint's Day of Santa Elena (Saint Helena) every May 3rd with its neighboring town El Cuervo.
