= El Sitio =

- town
- Interactive map of El Sitio
- Coordinates: 21.9667°N 101.5833°W
- Country: Mexico
- Municipality: Pinos
- Elevation: 2,190 m (7,190 ft)

Population
  - Total: 1,381
- Area code: 496

El Sitio is a town located within the municipality of Pinos in the state of Zacatecas.
