= La Moncada =

Coordinates: 20°16′N 100°48′W

La Moncada is a small town in the Tarimoro Municipality of Guanajuato, Mexico. The town has a population of 5,100 and sits on the road from Tarimoro City to Federal Highway 51 (Celaya-Salvatierra segment), it was founded in 1877 as La Moncada San José.

== Education ==
La Moncada has two public elementary schools—Primaria José María Morelos y Pavón and Primaria Netzahualcóyotl— and one private, Catholic elementary school—Primaria Niños Héroes. Most secondary students attend middle school at Secundaria Emiliano Zapata in nearby Charco Largo or Secundaria María Fuentes Sandoval in Tarimoro City.

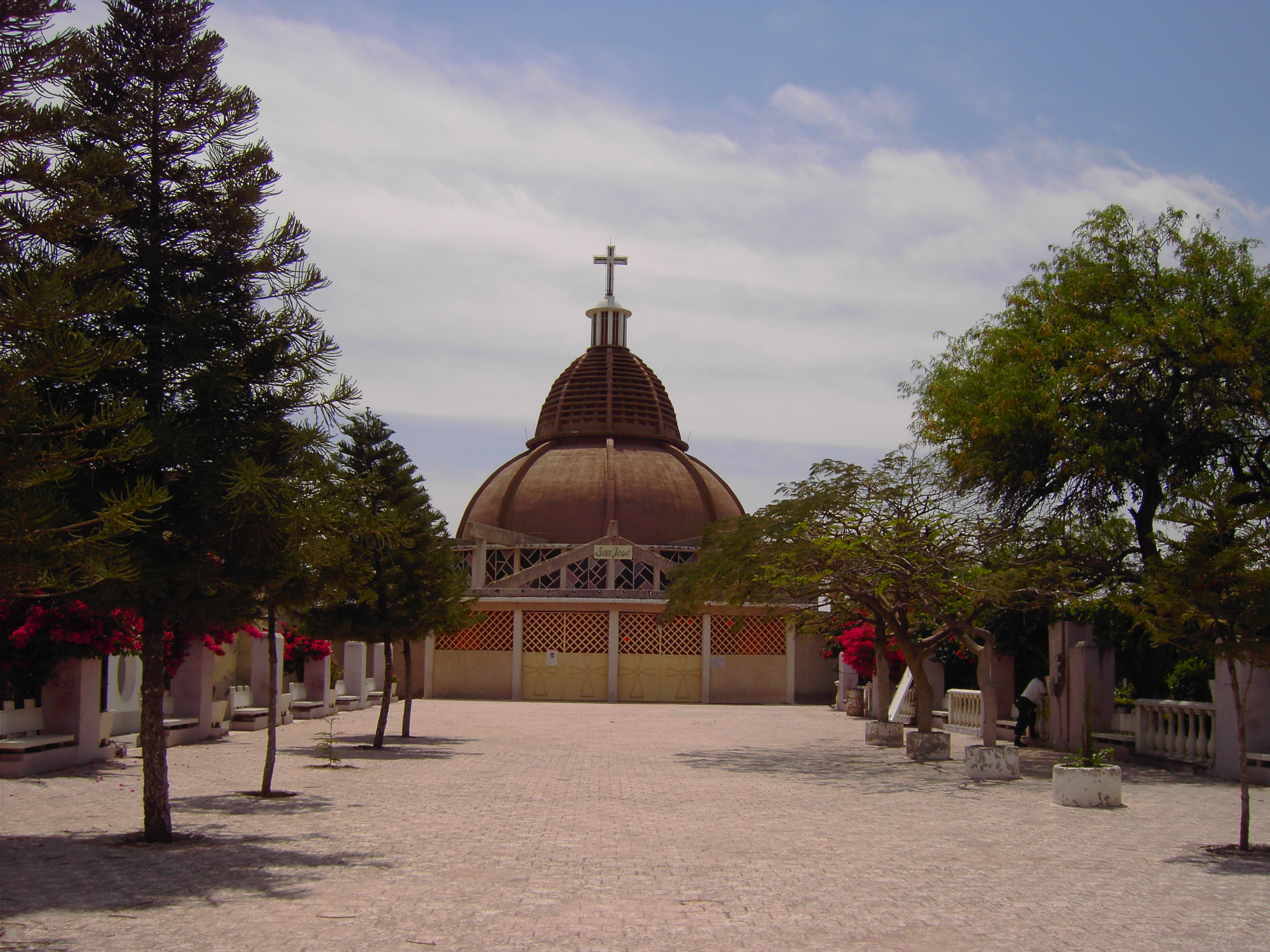
San José Obrero—La Moncada's main church.

== Religion ==
Being in the Catholic conservative Bajío region of Mexico, La Moncada's population is highly religious. The town's main church is San José Obrero, which becomes the social centre in town each Sunday afternoon. It also has three smaller chapels scattered around town, including Capilla San José Carpintero, Capilla de la Virgen de Guadalupe, and Capilla San Antonio; in temples it outnumbers even the municipal seat at Tarimoro City (a city with about four times the population), by one.

== Mayor ==
The current town mayor is Marco Lopez.
