= Tlazazalca =

Town in Michoacan, Mexico

Coordinates: 19°58′N 102°04′W

- Municipality
- Location in Mexico Tlazazalca (Mexico)
- Country: Mexico
- State: Michoacán
- Demonym: (in Spanish)
- Time zone: UTC−6 (CST)

Tlazazalca is a small town in the northern region of Michoacan, Mexico in an area first settled by ancient Nahua tribes in the early 14th Century.

== Overview ==
The town was officially established in 1545 by the Franciscan priest John of Saint Michael (Spanish: Juan de San Miguel) who accompanied the army of Nuño de Guzman during the invasion and enslavement of the region. Subsequently, Franciscan priests proceeded to baptize the enslaved Native Purepecha populations that inhabited the area. In addition to the city center, the Spanish Invaders also established within the jurisdiction of Tlazazalca an "Indian Republic" (Spanish: Republica de Indios) whose role was to govern directly the Native populations subjected to Spanish authority.

The town and surrounding areas were administered by the Parish of Saint Mark the Archangel (Parroquia de San Miguel Arcángel) whose name was chosen in honor of the town's Franciscan founder. Tlazazalca initially served as a major governing center in Michoacan until it was later subordinated to Zamora and Valladolid (Morelia).

== List of mayors ==
Mayo-Agosto 1904: Jesus Magaña y Bravo

- Mayo-Agosto 1908: Jesus Magaña y Bravo
- Septiembre 1909-Septiembre 1910: Jesus Magaña y Bravo
- 1940: José Zamora Gil
- 1941: J. Salud Díaz Navarro
- 1942: J. Jesús Martínez

J. Jesús Aguilar Gil
José Chávez Chávez

- 1944: Fidel Magaña
- 1945: José Orozco Enríquez

Roberto Canchú Parocua

- 1946: Joaquín Anaya Rocha
- 1947: José Rodríguez Espinoza
- 1948: Carlos Meza García
- 1949: J. Jesús Fernández García

Alberto Fernández Torres

- 1950: Pilar Peña Orozco

Jesús Magaña
Gabriel Magaña
Ignacio Chávez
José Rodríguez Espinoza
Crispin Vaca
Antonio Cortés
Cornelio Andrade
Eraclio Luna
Leobardo Chávez
Octavio Magaña
Indalecio Magaña
Rosendo Magaña
Sabad Vaca
Ladislao Méndez
Luis Fernández

- 1955: Salud Días Navarro

Rubén Castillo Morales
José María Marrón
José Rodríguez Espinoza

- 1960: Enrique Cortés Mújica
- 1961: Salvador Madrigal Chávez
- 1963: Emilio García Gámez

Francisco Paz

- 1966: Luis Vaca Ramírez
- 1969-1971: Miguel Parocua Paz
- 1972-1974: Luis Canchú Martínez
- 1975-1977: Miguel Calderón Martínez
- 1978-1980: Gonzalo Verduzco Gil
- 1981-1983: Luis Andrade Chávez
- 1984-1986: Gonzalo Verduzco Gil
- 1987-1989: Luis Andrade Chávez
- 1990-1992: Agustín Rubio Vieyra
- 1993-1995: Adolfo González Ayala
- 1996-1998: José Cachú Aguilar
- 1999-2001: Gonzalo Pérez Sepúlveda
- 2002-2004: Heliodoro Rodríguez Perales
- 2005-2007: Gildardo García Luna
- 2007-2008: Jose Cachu Aguilar
- 2015: Javíer Andrade Mata
