= 11th federal electoral district of Michoacán =

Federal electoral district of Mexico

Michoacán's 11th
- Electoral district of the Chamber of Deputies of Mexico

- 11th district since 2023

Incumbent
- Member: Vanessa López Carrillo
- Party: ▌Labour Party
- Congress: 66th (2024–2027)

District
- State: Michoacán
- Coordinates: 19°31′N 101°36′W
- Covers: 15 municipalities: Acuitzio, Carácuaro, Erongarícuaro, Huetamo, Huiramba, Lagunillas, Madero, Nocupétaro, Pátzcuaro, San Lucas, Salvador Escalante, Tacámbaro, Tiquicheo, Turicato, Tzintzuntzan
- PR region: Fifth
- Precincts: 298
- Population: 421,950 (2020 census)

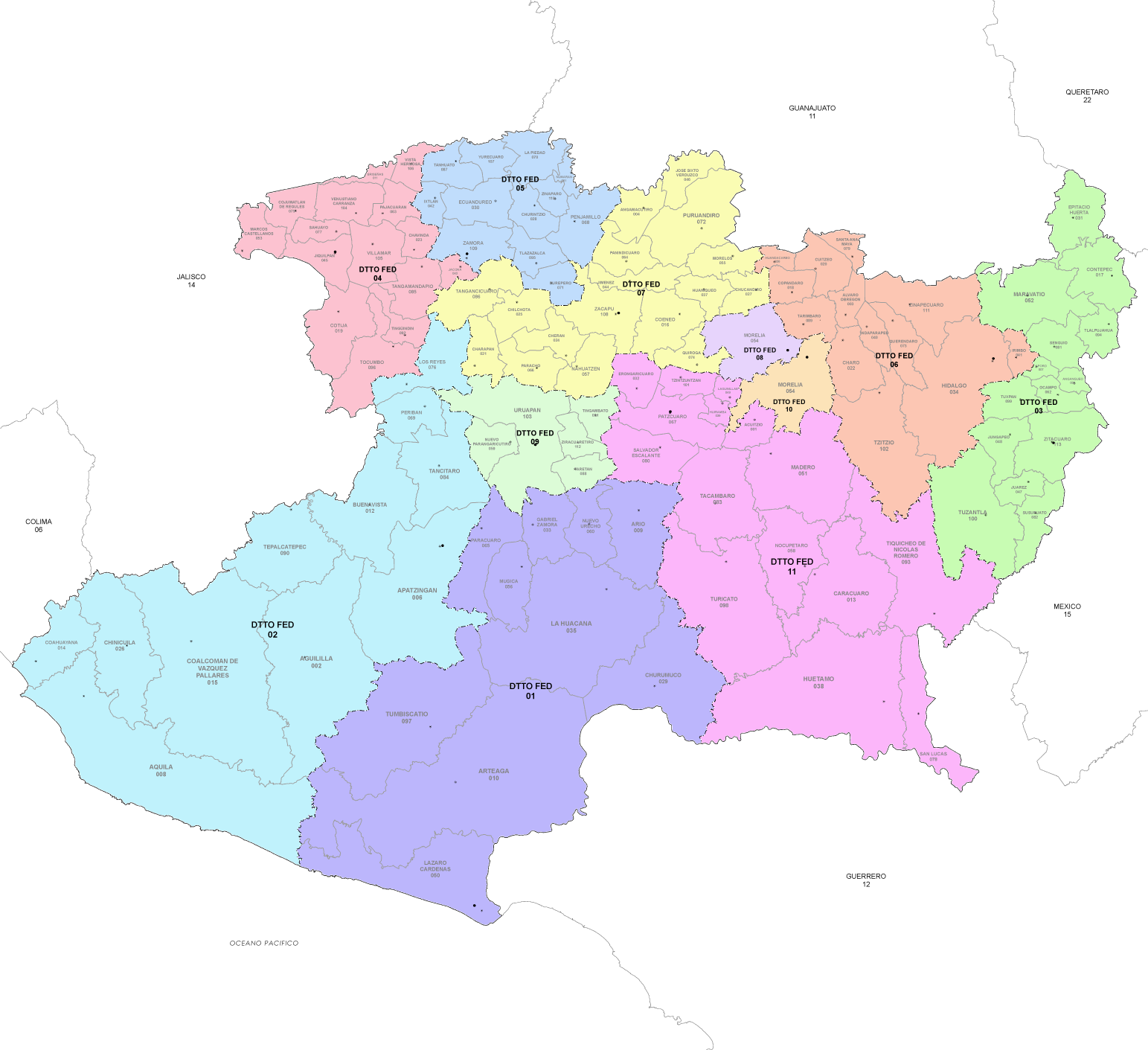
Michoacán's federal electoral districts since 2023

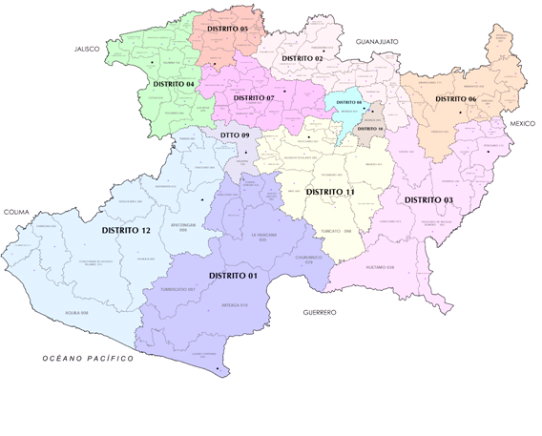
Michoacán under the 2017–2022 districting scheme

The 11th federal electoral district of Michoacán (Spanish: Distrito electoral federal 11 de Michoacán) is one of the 300 electoral districts into which Mexico is divided for elections to the federal Chamber of Deputies and one of 11 such districts in the state of Michoacán.

It elects one deputy to the lower house of Congress for each three-year legislative session by means of the first-past-the-post system. Votes cast in the district also count towards the calculation of proportional representation ("plurinominal") deputies elected from the fifth region.

Suspended in 1930, (Note: An amendment to Article 52 of the Constitution in 1928 changed the original provision of "one deputy per 60,000 inhabitants" to "one deputy per 100,000"; as a result, the size of the Chamber of Deputies fell from 281 in the 1928 election to 171 in 1934.) the 11th district was re-established by the 1977 electoral reforms, which increased the number of single-member seats in the Chamber of Deputies from 196 to 300. Under the reforms, Michoacán's allocation rose from 9 to 13. The restored 11th district elected its first deputy in the 1979 mid-term election.

The current member for the district, elected in the 2024 general election, is Vanessa López Carrillo of the Labour Party (PT).

== District territory ==
Michoacán lost its 12th district in the 2023 districting process carried out by the National Electoral Institute (INE). Under the new districting plan, which is to be used for the 2024, 2027 and 2030 federal elections, the 11th district covers 298 precincts (secciones electorales) across 15 municipalities in the centre and south-east of the state:

- Acuitzio, Carácuaro, Erongarícuaro, Huetamo, Huiramba, Lagunillas, Madero, Nocupétaro, Pátzcuaro, San Lucas, Salvador Escalante, Tacámbaro, Tiquicheo, Turicato and Tzintzuntzan.

The head town (cabecera distrital), where results from individual polling stations are gathered together and tallied, is the city of Pátzcuaro. The district reported a population of 421,950 in the 2020 census.

== Previous districting schemes ==
Evolution of electoral district numbers
	1974	1978	1996	2005	2017	2023
Michoacán	9	13	13	12	12	11
Chamber of Deputies	196	300				

2017–2022

Between 2017 and 2022, the district's head town was at Pátzcuaro but its composition was different. It covered 14 municipalities, with some overlaps with the 2022 scheme:
- Acuitzio, Ario, Huiramba, Lagunillas, Madero, Nocupétaro, Pátzcuaro, Salvador Escalante, Tacámbaro, Taretan, Tingambato, Turicato, Tzintzuntzan and Ziracuaretiro.

2005–2017

Under the 2005 districting plan, Michoacán lost its 13th district. The 11th district's head town was at Pátzcuaro and it covered 13 municipalities:
- Acuitzio, Carácuaro, Huetamo, Huiramba, Lagunillas, Madero, Nocupétaro, Pátzcuaro, Salvador Escalante, San Lucas, Tacámbaro, Turicato and Tzintzuntzan.

1996–2005

Under the 1996 districting plan, the district's head town was at the city of Tacámbaro de Codallos and it covered 12 municipalities:
- Acuitzio, Ario, Carácuaro, Churumuco, Huetamo, Madero, Nocupétaro, Salvador Escalante, San Lucas, Tacámbaro, Tiquicheo and Turicato.

1978–1996

The districting scheme in force from 1978 to 1996 was the result of the 1977 electoral reforms, which increased the number of single-member seats in the Chamber of Deputies from 196 to 300. Under the reforms, Michoacán's allocation rose from 9 to 13. The 11th district's head town was the city of Jiquilpan in the west of the state and it was composed of 13 municipalities.

== Deputies returned to Congress ==
(Mexico) National parties
- Current
- PAN
- PRI
- PT
- PVEM
- MC
- Morena
- PAZ
- Somos
- Defunct or local only
- PLM
- PNR
- PRM
- PNM
- PP
- PPS
- PARM
- PFCRN
- CON
- PANAL
- PSD
- PES
- PES
- PRD

Michoacán's 11th district
Election	Deputy	Party	Term	Legislature
1916	José Álvarez y Álvarez		1916–1917	Constituent Congress of Querétaro
1917	Rafael Cano		1917–1918	27th Congress
1918	J. Isaac Arriaga		1918–1920	28th Congress
1920	Vacant		1920–1922	29th Congress
1922	Emigdio Santa Cruz		1922–1924	30th Congress
1924	Melchor Ortega		1924–1926	31st Congress
1926	Melchor Ortega		1926–1928	32nd Congress
1928	Melchor Ortega		1928–1930	33rd Congress
The 11th district was suspended between 1930 and 1979
1979	Leticia Amezcua Gudiño	Institutional Revolutionary Party	1979–1982	51st Congress
1982	Armando Octavio Ballinas Mayés	Institutional Revolutionary Party	1982–1985	52nd Congress
1985	Rosalba Buenrostro López	Institutional Revolutionary Party	1985–1988	53rd Congress
1988	Pablo García Figueroa	Popular Socialist Party (Mexico)	1988–1991	54th Congress
1991	Alfredo Anaya Gudiño	Institutional Revolutionary Party	1991–1994	55th Congress
1994	Armando Octavio Ballinas Mayés	Institutional Revolutionary Party	1994–1997	56th Congress
1997	Mariano Sánchez Farías	Party of the Democratic Revolution	1997–2000	57th Congress
2000	Jesús Reyna García	Institutional Revolutionary Party	2000–2003	58th Congress
2003	Israel Tentory García	Party of the Democratic Revolution	2003–2006	59th Congress
2006	Francisco Márquez Tinoco	Party of the Democratic Revolution	2006–2009	60th Congress
2009	Víctor Manuel Báez Ceja (Note: Báez Ceja resigned his seat on 1 March 2011.); José Alfredo González Díaz	Party of the Democratic Revolution	2009–2012	61st Congress
2012	Antonio García Conejo	Party of the Democratic Revolution	2012–2015	62nd Congress
2015	Araceli Saucedo Reyes	Party of the Democratic Revolution	2015–2018	63rd Congress
2018	José Guadalupe Aguilera Rojas	Party of the Democratic Revolution	2018–2021	64th Congress
2021	Macarena Chávez Flores	Party of the Democratic Revolution	2021–2024	65th Congress
2024	Vanessa López Carrillo	Labour Party (Mexico)	2024–2027	66th Congress

== Presidential elections ==
Michoacán's 11th district
Election	District won by	Party or coalition	%
2018	Andrés Manuel López Obrador	Juntos Haremos Historia	48.7634
2024	Claudia Sheinbaum Pardo	Sigamos Haciendo Historia	58.8975
