= Antonio García Conejo =

Mexican politician

Senator of the Congress of the Union for Michoacán
- Incumbent
- Assumed office 1 September 2021 Serving with Blanca Estela Piña Gudiño and Cristóbal Arias Solís
- Preceded by: Marco Trejo Pureco
- In office 1 September 2018 – 4 March 2021
- Preceded by: Raúl Morón Orozco
- Succeeded by: Marco Trejo Pureco

Personal details
- Born: 5 September 1971 (age 54) Carácuaro, Michoacán, Mexico
- Party: Morena
- Other political affiliations: PRD (before 2024)
- Education: UMSNH
- Occupation: Politician

Antonio García Conejo (born 5 September 1971) is a Mexican politician affiliated with the Party of the Democratic Revolution (PRD).

== Career ==
García Conejo was born in Carácuaro, Michoacán, in 1971. He was elected the municipal president of Huetamo, Michoacán, for the 2004–2007 term, and he sat in the Congress of Michoacán from 2007 to 2011.

In the 2012 general election he was elected to the Chamber of Deputies to represent Michoacán's 11th district during the 62nd session of Congress. On 11 December 2013, García made headlines when, amidst the debate about energy reform in Congress, he stripped off his clothes.

In the 2018 general election he was elected on the PRD ticket to the Senate for the state of Michoacán.

In March 2024 he resigned from the PRD and aligned himself with the National Regeneration Movement (Morena).

== Personal life ==
García Conejo is the half brother of Silvano Aureoles Conejo, who served as governor of Michoacán from 2015 to 2021.
