= Jaime Rodríguez López =

Mexican politician (born 1955)

Jaime Rodríguez López (Note: In this Mexican name, the surname is Rodríguez and the second or maternal family name is López.) (born 1 January 1955) is a Mexican politician affiliated with the Institutional Revolutionary Party (PRI).

== Life and career ==
Jaime Rodríguez López was born in Ziquítaro, in the municipality of Penjamillo, Michoacán, on 1 January 1955. He holds an engineering degree in wood technology from the Universidad Michoacana de San Nicolás de Hidalgo (UMSNH).

From 1984 to 1986 he was the municipal president of Penjamillo and from 1989 to 1991 he served in the Congress of Michoacán. In the 1994 general election, he was elected to the Chamber of Deputies to represent Michoacán's 4th district for the PRI during the 56th Congress, when he served on the standing committees for handcrafts and cooperative development. He resigned his seat on 22 January 1997 to take office as the secretary of agricultural development in the Michoacán state government. In 2000, he returned to Congress to represent Michoacán's 1st district during the 58th legislative session, when he chaired the standing committee on agriculture and livestock and served on the special livestock committee, the environmental and natural resources committee, and the group of friends of Canada.

In April 2015, he was appointed to serve as the representative of the federal Secretariat of Agriculture, Livestock, Rural Development, Fisheries and Food (SAGARPA) in the state of Michoacán.

In the months before the 2024 general election, after meeting with Alfonso Martínez Alcázar, the municipal president of Morelia and a member of the National Action Party (PAN), Rodríguez López issued a public statement reaffirming his loyalty to the PRI and explaining that the meeting had to do with the presidential campaign of Xóchitl Gálvez, the candidate of an alliance comprising both parties.
