= Lagunillas =

Lagunillas may refer to the following places:

Bolivia

- Lagunillas, Santa Cruz, Bolivia

Chile

- Lagunillas, Chile

Mexico

- Lagunillas, Jalisco
- Lagunillas, Michoacán, Mexico
- Lagunillas, San Luis Potosí, Mexico
- Lagunillas Municipality, Michoacán, Mexico
- Lagunillas Municipality, San Luis Potosí, Mexico

Venezuela

- Lagunillas, Mérida, Venezuela
- Lagunillas Municipality, Zulia, Venezuela

== See also ==
- Lagunilla, Province of Salamanca, Spain
- Lagunilla del Jubera, La Rioja, Spain
- La Lagunilla Market, in Mexico City
- Lagunilla metro station, in Mexico City
- Garibaldi / Lagunilla metro station, in Mexico City
- Lagunilla (Mexibús), in Chimalhuacán, State of Mexico
- San Pedro Lagunillas, Nayarit, Mexico
