= 10th federal electoral district of Michoacán =

Federal electoral district of Mexico

Michoacán's 10th
- Electoral district of the Chamber of Deputies of Mexico

- 10th district since 2023

Incumbent
- Member: David Cortés Mendoza
- Party: ▌National Action Party
- Congress: 66th (2024–2027)

District
- State: Michoacán
- Head town: Morelia
- Coordinates: 19°42′N 101°11′W
- Covers: Municipality of Morelia (part)
- PR region: Fifth
- Precincts: 208
- Population: 425,219 (2020 census)

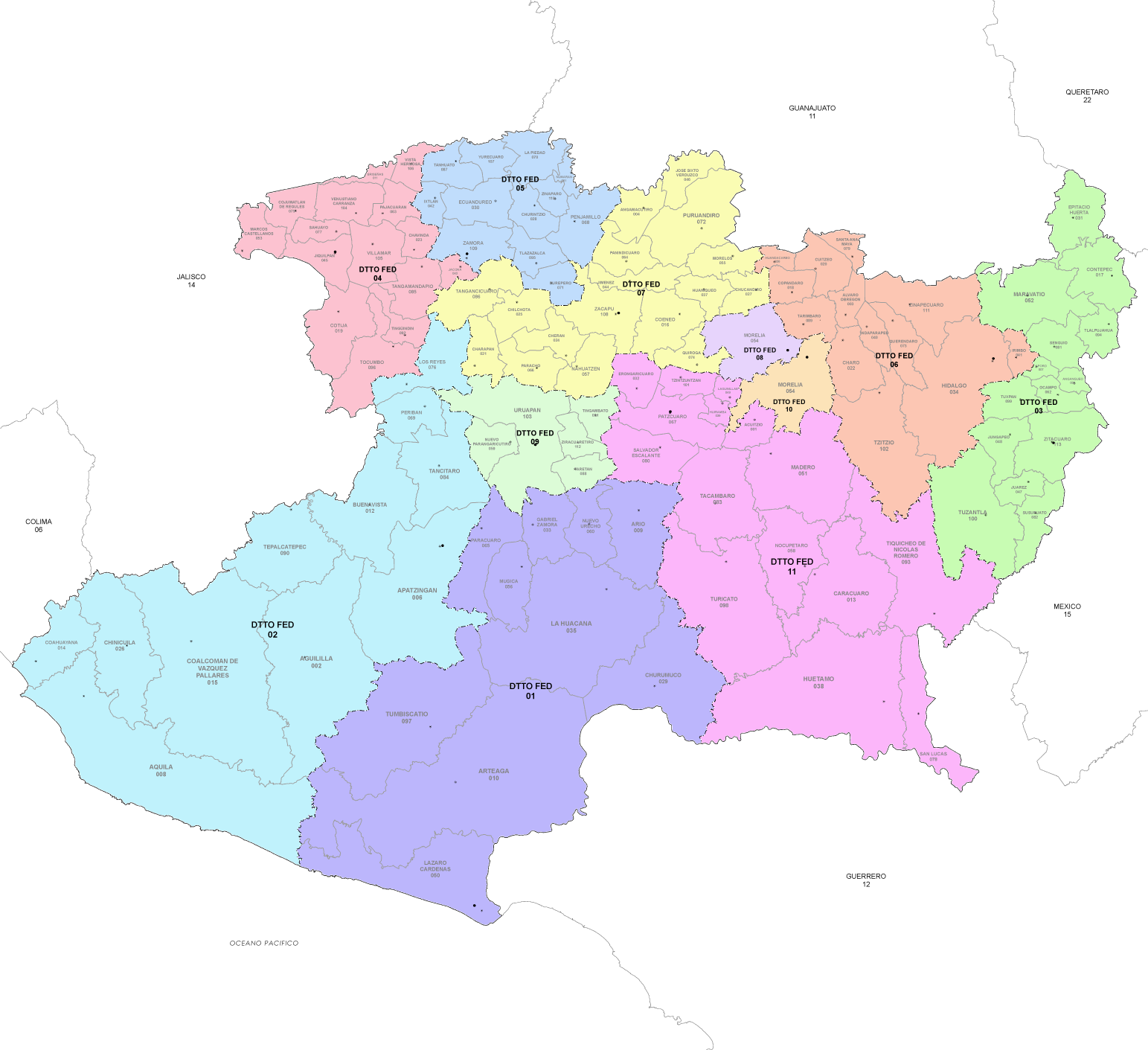
Michoacán's federal electoral districts since 2023

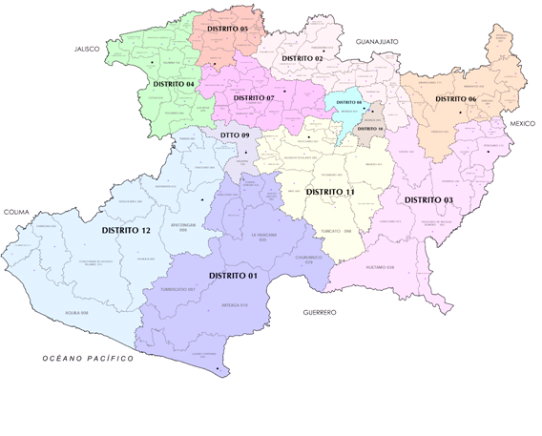
Michoacán under the 2017–2022 districting scheme

The 10th federal electoral district of Michoacán (Spanish: Distrito electoral federal 10 de Michoacán) is one of the 300 electoral districts into which Mexico is divided for elections to the federal Chamber of Deputies and one of 11 such districts in the state of Michoacán.

It elects one deputy to the lower house of Congress for each three-year legislative session by means of the first-past-the-post system. Votes cast in the district also count towards the calculation of proportional representation ("plurinominal") deputies elected from the fifth region.

Suspended in 1930, (Note: An amendment to Article 52 of the Constitution in 1928 changed the original provision of "one deputy per 60,000 inhabitants" to "one deputy per 100,000"; as a result, the size of the Chamber of Deputies fell from 281 in the 1928 election to 171 in 1934.) the 10th district was re-established by the 1977 electoral reforms, which increased the number of single-member seats in the Chamber of Deputies from 196 to 300. Under the reforms, Michoacán's allocation rose from 9 to 13. The restored tenth district elected its first deputy in the 1979 mid-term election.

The current member for the district, elected in the 2024 general election, is David Alejandro Cortés Mendoza of the National Action Party (PAN).

== District territory ==
Michoacán lost its 12th district in the 2023 districting process carried out by the National Electoral Institute (INE). Under the new districting plan, which is to be used for the 2024, 2027 and 2030 federal elections, the 10th district covers 208 electoral precincts (secciones electorales) in the south-east sector of the municipality of Morelia. (Note: The remainder of the municipality makes up the 8th district.)

The head town (cabecera distrital), where results from individual polling stations are gathered together and tallied, is the state capital, the city of Morelia. The district reported a population of 425,219 in the 2020 census.

== Previous districting schemes ==
Evolution of electoral district numbers
	1974	1978	1996	2005	2017	2023
Michoacán	9	13	13	12	12	11
Chamber of Deputies	196	300				

2017–2022

Between 2017 and 2022, the district's head town was at Morelia and it comprised 222 precincts in the south-east of the municipality of Morelia.

2005–2017

Under the 2005 districting plan, Michoacán lost its 13th district. The 10th district's head town was at Morelia and it covered 204 precincts in the south and east of the municipality.

1996–2005

Under the 1996 districting plan, the district's head town was at Morelia and it covered the southern portion of the municipality.

1978–1996

The districting scheme in force from 1978 to 1996 was the result of the 1977 electoral reforms, which increased the number of single-member seats in the Chamber of Deputies from 196 to 300. Under the reforms, Michoacán's allocation rose from 9 to 13. The 10th district's head town was at Quiroga to the west of the state capital and it comprised 15 municipalities in the central part of the state:
- Acuitzio, Álvaro Obregón, Copándaro, Cuitzeo, Chucándiro, Huandacareo, Huaniqueo, Huiramba, Lagunillas, Morelos, Quiroga, Santa Ana Maya, Tarímbaro, Tzintzuntzan, and the rural portion of the municipality of Morelia.

== Deputies returned to Congress ==
(Mexico) National parties
- Current
- PAN
- PRI
- PT
- PVEM
- MC
- Morena
- PAZ
- Somos
- Defunct or local only
- PLM
- PNR
- PRM
- PNM
- PP
- PPS
- PARM
- PFCRN
- CON
- PANAL
- PSD
- PES
- PES
- PRD

Michoacán's 10th district
Election	Deputy	Party	Term	Legislature
1916	Martín Castrejón; Alberto Alvarado		1916–1917	Constituent Congress of Querétaro
1917	Candor Guajardo		1917–1918	27th Congress
1918	Juan de Dios Avellaneda		1918–1920	28th Congress
1920	Ignacio Villegas C.		1920–1922	29th Congress
1922	Ignacio Villegas C.		1922–1924	30th Congress
1924	Efraín Pineda		1924–1926	31st Congress
1926	Efraín Pineda		1926–1928	32nd Congress
1928	Efraín Pineda		1928–1930	33rd Congress
The 10th district was suspended between 1930 and 1979
1979	Genovevo Figueroa Zamudio	Institutional Revolutionary Party	1979–1982	51st Congress
1982	Eulalio Ramos Valladolid	Institutional Revolutionary Party	1982–1985	52nd Congress
1985	Janitzio Mújica Rodríguez Cabo	Institutional Revolutionary Party	1985–1988	53rd Congress
1988	Vicente Luis Coca Álvarez	Authentic Party of the Mexican Revolution	1988–1991	54th Congress
1991	Carlos Ávila Figueroa	Institutional Revolutionary Party	1991–1994	55th Congress
1994	Victoria Eugenia Méndez Márquez	Institutional Revolutionary Party	1994–1997	56th Congress
1997	Samuel Maldonado Bautista	Party of the Democratic Revolution	1997–2000	57th Congress
2000	Salvador López Orduña	National Action Party (Mexico)	2000–2003	58th Congress
2003	Pablo Villanueva Ramírez	National Action Party (Mexico)	2003–2006	59th Congress
2006	José Luis Espinosa Piña	National Action Party (Mexico)	2006–2009	60th Congress
2009	Laura Suárez González	National Action Party (Mexico)	2009–2012	61st Congress
2012	Ernesto Núñez Aguilar	Ecologist Green Party of Mexico	2012–2015	62nd Congress
2015	Daniela de los Santos Torres (Note: De los Santos Torres resigned her seat on 1 February 2018.); Georgina Paola Villalpando Barrios	Ecologist Green Party of Mexico	2015–2018	63rd Congress
2018	Iván Arturo Pérez Negrón Ruiz	Social Encounter Party	2018–2021	64th Congress
2021	Carlos Quintana Martínez (Note: Quintana Martínez resigned his seat on 1 March 2024); Omar Francisco Gudiño Magaña	National Action Party (Mexico)	2021–2024; 2024	65th Congress
2024	David Alejandro Cortés Mendoza	National Action Party (Mexico)	2024–2027	66th Congress

== Presidential elections ==
Michoacán's 10th district
Election	District won by	Party or coalition	%
2018	Andrés Manuel López Obrador	Juntos Haremos Historia	45.9831
2024	Bertha Xóchitl Gálvez Ruiz	Fuerza y Corazón por México	44.3221
