= Ana Lilia Guillén Quiroz =

Mexican politician (born 1955)

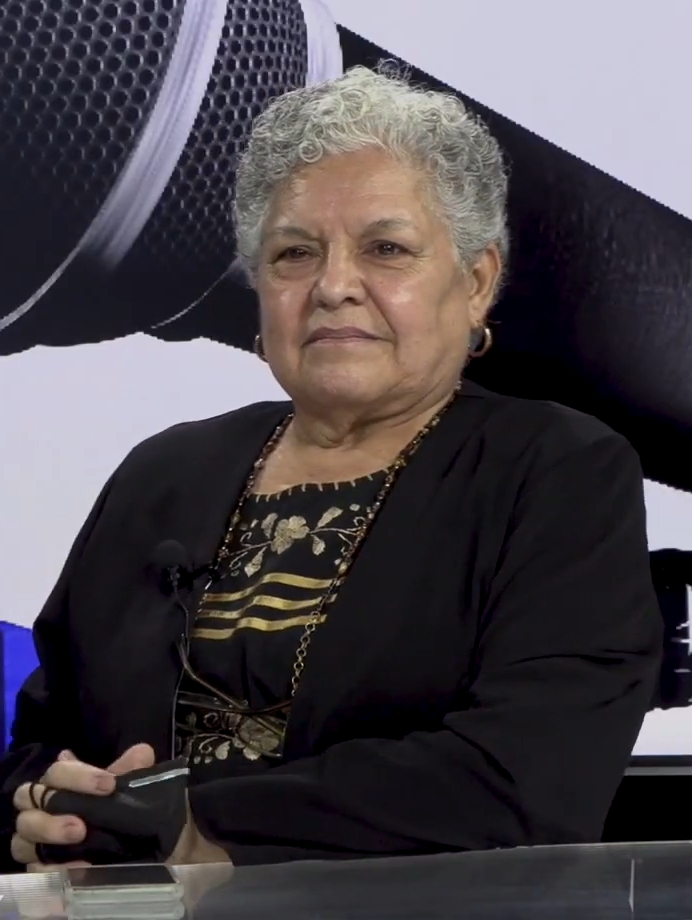
- Guillén Quiroz in 2021

Deputy of Mexico
- In office 1 September 2018 – 31 August 2021
- Preceded by: Fernando Castro Ventura
- Succeeded by: Roberto Carlos López García
- Constituency: Michoacán VIII
- In office 1 September 2003 – 31 August 2006
- Preceded by: Sergio Acosta Salazar
- Succeeded by: Daniel Chávez García
- Constituency: Michoacán VIII

Personal details
- Born: 5 February 1955 (age 71) Michoacán, Mexico
- Party: PRD; MORENA

Ana Lilia Guillén Quiroz (born 5 February 1955) is a Mexican politician affiliated with the Party of the Democratic Revolution (PRD) and, later, with the National Regeneration Movement (Morena).

In the 2003 mid-terms she was elected to the Chamber of Deputies to represent Michoacán's eighth district for the PRD during the 61st session of Congress. In the 2018 general election she was re-elected for the same seat on the Morena ticket for the 64th session.
