= Tiquicheo =

Municipality of Mexico

Coordinates: 18°54′N 100°44′W

- Municipality
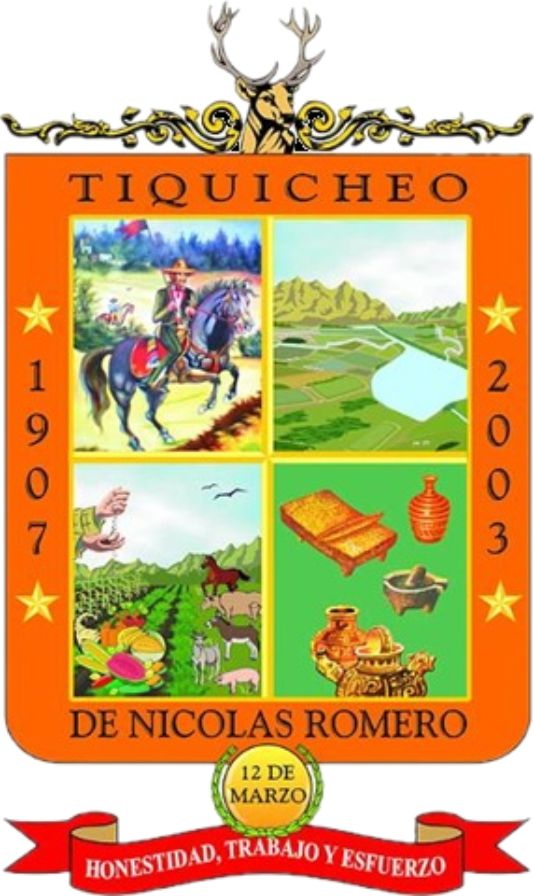
- Coat of arms

- Location in Mexico Tiquicheo (Mexico)
- Country: Mexico
- State: Michoacán
- Demonym: (in Spanish)
- Time zone: UTC−6 (CST)

Tiquicheo de Nicolás Romero is a municipality in the Mexican state of Michoacán. The municipality has an area of 1,429.65 square kilometres (4.89% of the surface of the state) and is bordered to the north by the municipality of Tzitzio, to the east by Tuzantla and the state of México, to the south by San Lucas, Huetamo and the state of Guerrero, and to the west by Carácuaro and Madero. The municipality had a population of 13,665 inhabitants according to the 2005 census. Its municipal seat is the city of Tiquicheo.

== Assassination ==
Tiquicheo's one-time mayor, Maria Santos Gorrostieta, was murdered in 2012, after having survived two assassination attempts while she was in office from 2008 to 2011. In one of those attempts her husband, Jose Sanchez, was killed. Speculation centered on drug gangs.
