= Carácuaro de Morelos =

- Town
- Location within Michoacán Location within Mexico
- Coordinates: 19.0164°N 101.1265°W
- Country: Mexico
- State: Michoacán
- Municipality: Carácuaro

Population (2020)
  - Total: 4,149

Carácuaro de Morelos is a town in the Mexican state of Michoacán. It serves as the municipal seat for the surrounding municipality of Carácuaro.

== Toponomy ==
The word "Carácuaro" comes from the Chichimeca word carakua, meaning "place of slope" or "place on the slope". "Morelos" refers to José María Morelos, a prominent revolutionary during the Mexican War of Independence.

== Demographics ==
In the 2020 census, Carácuaro de Morelos had 4,149 inhabitants, which represents an average increase of 1.3% per year in the 2010-2020 period based on the 3,653 inhabitants registered in the previous census. It occupies an area of 2,418 km^{2}, with a density of 1,716 inhabitants/km^{2}.

In 2010, it was classified as a locality with a high degree of social vulnerability. The population of Carácuaro de Morelos is mostly literate (8.10% of illiterate people as of 2020) with a schooling level of more than 7.5 years. Only 0.29% of the population recognizes itself as indigenous.
