= Nocupétaro =

- Municipality
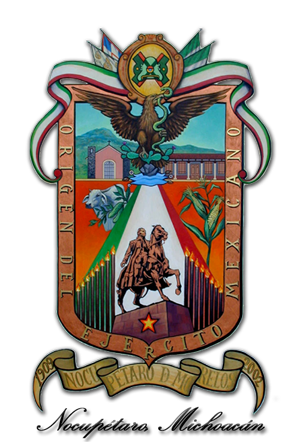
- Coat of arms

- Location of Nocupétaro Nocupétaro (Mexico)
- Coordinates: 19°02′37″N 101°09′45″W
- Country: Mexico
- State: Michoacán
- Established: 2 April 1910
- Seat: Nocupétaro de Morales

Government
  - President: J. Félix González Gómez

Area
  - Total: 547.184 km^{2} (211.269 sq mi)
- Elevation (of seat): 664 m (2,178 ft)

Population (2010 Census)
  - Total: 7,799
  - Estimate (2015 Intercensal Survey): 8,195
  - Density: 14.25/km^{2} (36.92/sq mi)
  - Seat: 3,260
- Time zone: UTC-6 (Central)
- Postal codes: 61900–61918
- Area code: 443
- Website: Official website

Nocupétaro is a municipality in the Mexican state of Michoacán. It is located approximately 75 kilometres (47 mi) south of the state capital of Morelia.

== Geography ==
The municipality of Nocupétaro is located in the Tierra Caliente region of Michoacán at an elevation between 500 and 1,800 metres (1,600–5,900 ft). It borders the municipalities of Madero to the north, Carácuaro to the east, Turicato to the southwest, and Tacámbaro to the northwest. The municipality covers an area of 547.184 square kilometres (211.269 sq mi) and comprises 0.93% of the state's area.

As of 2009, the land cover in Nocupétaro consists of tropical forest (59%), grassland (19%) and temperate forest (14%). Another 7% of the land is used for agriculture and 0.6% consists of urban areas. Nocupétaro is located in the drainage basin of the Tacámbaro River, a tributary of the Balsas River.

=== Climate ===
Most of Nocupétaro has a tropical wet and dry climate with rain in the summer, while the southernmost portion of the municipality has a semi-arid climate. Average temperatures in the municipality range between 20 and 28 °C (68–82 °F), and average annual precipitation ranges between 700 and 1,100 millimetres (28–43 in).

== History ==
Nocupétaro has been inhabited since pre-Hispanic times. The name is of Chichimeca origin and means "place in the valley". The area was evangelized by Juan Bautista Moya, the "Apostle of the Tierra Caliente", in the 16th century. José María Morelos served as parish priest of Carácuaro and Nocupétaro from 1799 until 1810, when he joined the rebels in the Mexican War of Independence. In 1822, Nocupétaro was made part of the partido of Tacámbaro. It became an independent municipality in 1910.

== Administration ==
The municipal government of Nocupétaro comprises a president, a councillor (Spanish: síndico), and seven trustees (regidores), four elected by relative majority and three by proportional representation. The current president of the municipality is J. Félix González Gómez.

== Demographics ==
In the 2010 Mexican Census, the municipality of Nocupétaro recorded a population of 7799 inhabitants living in 1858 households. The 2015 Intercensal Survey estimated a population of 8195 inhabitants in Nocupétaro.

There are 142 localities in the municipality, of which only the municipal seat Nocupétaro de Morelos is classified as urban. It recorded a population of 3260 inhabitants in the 2010 Census.

== Economy ==
Nocupétaro is one of the poorest municipalities in Michoacán. As of 2017, half of its population lived in extreme poverty. Agriculture is the main economic activity in the municipality. The main crops are corn, sorghum, beans and squash, and livestock such as goats, pigs, cattle and poultry are raised.
