= Laura Suarez =

Laura Suarez or Suárez may refer to:

- Laura Suarez (singer) (1909–1990), Brazilian singer
- Laura Suárez (footballer) (born 1992), Puerto Rican women's international footballer
- Laura Margarita Suárez (born 1953), Mexican politician
- Laura Suárez (volleyball), Cuban volleyball player
