= 2016 in Chilean football =

Football in Chile
- Season: 2016

This article covers the 2016 football season in Chile.

== National tournaments ==
=== Primera División ===
- Clausura Champion: Club Deportivo Universidad Católica
  - Topscorer: Nicolas Castillo
- Apertura Champion: TBD
  - Topscorer: TBD

=== Copa Chile ===
- Champion:
  - Topscorer:

== National team results ==
The Chile national football team results and fixtures for 2015.

Win Draw Loss

=== 2016 ===
| March 24 2018 World Cup Q | Chile | 1–2 | Argentina | Santiago, Chile |
| 20:30 (UTC−3) | Gutiérrez 10' | Report (FIFA); Report (CONMEBOL) | Di María 19'; Mercado 24' | Stadium: Estadio Nacional Julio Martínez Prádanos; Attendance: 44,500; Referee: Héber Lopes (Brazil) |

| March 29 2018 World Cup Q | Venezuela | 1–4 | Chile | Barinas, Venezuela |
| 19:00 (UTC−4.5) | Otero 9' | Report (FIFA); Report (CONMEBOL) | Pinilla 33', 52'; Vidal 72', 90+2' | Stadium: Estadio Agustín Tovar; Referee: Diego Haro (Peru) |

| May 27 Friendly | Chile | 1–2 | Jamaica | Viña del Mar, Chile |
| 19:00 (UTC−3) | Castillo 81' | Report | Donaldson 35'; Grant 52' | Stadium: Estadio Sausalito; Attendance: 22,000; Referee: Raúl Orozco (Bolivia) |

| June 1 Friendly | Mexico | 1–0 | Chile | San Diego, United States |
| 19:00 (UTC−6) | Hernández 86' | Report | | Stadium: Qualcomm Stadium; Attendance: 65,000; Referee: Baldomero Toledo (United States) |

| June 6 Copa América Centenario | Argentina | 2–1 | Chile | Santa Clara, United States |
| 22:00 EDT (UTC−4) | Di María 51'; Banega 59' | Report (CONMEBOL); Report (CONCACAF); Report (FIFA) | Fuenzalida 90+3' | Stadium: Levi's Stadium; Attendance: 69,451; Referee: Daniel Fedorczuk (Uruguay) |

| June 10 Copa América Centenario | Chile | 2–1 | Bolivia | Foxborough, United States |
| 19:00 EDT (UTC−4) | Vidal 46', 90+10' (pen.) | Report (CONMEBOL); Report (CONCACAF) | Campos 61' | Stadium: Gillette Stadium; Attendance: 19,392; Referee: Jair Marrufo (United States) |

| June 14 Copa América Centenario | Chile | 4–2 | Panama | Philadelphia, United States |
| 20:00 EDT (UTC−4) | Vargas 14', 42'; Sánchez 49', 86' | Report (CONMEBOL); Report (CONCACAF) | Camargo 4'; Arroyo 74' | Stadium: Lincoln Financial Field; Attendance: 27,260; Referee: Roddy Zambrano (Ecuador) |

| June 18 Copa América Centenario | Mexico | 0–7 | Chile | Santa Clara, United States |
| 22:00 EDT (UTC−4) | | Report (CONMEBOL); Report (CONCACAF) | Puch 16', 88'; Vargas 44', 52', 57', 74'; Sánchez 49' | Stadium: Levi's Stadium; Attendance: 70,547; Referee: Héber Lopes (Brazil) |

| June 22 Copa América Centenario | Colombia | 0–2 | Chile | Chicago, United States |
| 20:00 EDT (UTC−4) | | Report (CONMEBOL); Report (CONCACAF) | Aránguiz 7'; Fuenzalida 11' | Stadium: Soldier Field; Attendance: 55,423; Referee: Joel Aguilar () |

| June 26 Copa América Centenario | Argentina | 0–0 (a.e.t.) (2–4 p) | Chile | East Rutherford, United States |
| 20:00 EDT (UTC−4) | | Report (CONMEBOL); Report (CONCACAF) | | Stadium: MetLife Stadium; Attendance: 82,026; Referee: Héber Lopes (Brazil) |
| | Penalties |
| | Messi (penalty missed); Mascherano (penalty scored); Agüero (penalty scored); Biglia (penalty missed) | | (penalty missed) Vidal; (penalty scored) Castillo; (penalty scored) Aránguiz; (penalty scored) Beausejour; (penalty scored) Silva |

| September 1 2018 World Cup Q | Paraguay | 2–1 | Chile | Asunción, Paraguay |
| 20:00 UTC−4 | O. Romero 6'; Da Silva 9' | Report (FIFA); Report (CONMEBOL) | Vidal 37' | Stadium: Estadio Defensores del Chaco; Attendance: 25,000; Referee: Néstor Pitana (Argentina) |

| September 6 2018 World Cup Q | Chile | 3–0; Awarded | Bolivia | Santiago, Chile |
| 20:30 UTC−3 | | | | Stadium: Estadio Monumental David Arellano; Referee: Ricardo Marques (Brazil) |

| October 6 2018 World Cup Q | Ecuador | 3–0 | Chile | Quito, Ecuador |
| 16:00 UTC−5 | A. Valencia 19'; Ramírez 23'; Caicedo 46' | Report (FIFA); Report (CONMEBOL) | | Stadium: Estadio Olímpico Atahualpa; Referee: Mauro Vigliano (Argentina) |

| October 11 2018 World Cup Q | Chile | 2–1 | Peru | Santiago, Chile |
| 20:30 UTC−3 | Vidal 10', 85' | Report (FIFA); Report (CONMEBOL) | Flores 76' | Stadium: Estadio Nacional Julio Martínez Prádanos; Referee: Roddy Zambrano (Ecuador) |

| November 10 2018 World Cup Q | Colombia | 0–0 | Chile | Barranquilla, Colombia |
| 15:30 UTC−5 | | Report (FIFA); Report (CONMEBOL) | | Stadium: Estadio Metropolitano Roberto Meléndez; Referee: Wilton Sampaio (Brazil) |

| November 15 2018 World Cup Q | Chile | 3–1 | Uruguay | Santiago, Chile |
| 20:30 UTC−3 | Vargas 45+1'; Sánchez 60', 76' | Report (FIFA); Report (CONMEBOL) | Cavani 16' | Stadium: Estadio Nacional Julio Martínez Prádanos; Referee: Enrique Cáceres (Paraguay) |

== Record ==
| Competition | GP | W | D | L | GF | GA |
|---|---|---|---|---|---|---|
| International Friendly | 2 | 0 | 0 | 2 | 1 | 3 |
| Copa América Centenario | 6 | 4 | 1 | 1 | 16 | 5 |
| 2018 FIFA World Cup qualification | 2 | 1 | 0 | 1 | 5 | 3 |
| Total | 10 | 5 | 1 | 4 | 22 | 11 |

== Goal scorers ==
| Player | Goals |
|---|---|
| Eduardo Vargas | 7 |
| Alexis Sánchez | 3 |
| Pablo Hernández | 3 |
| Jorge Valdivia | 2 |
| Charles Aránguiz | 2 |
| Rodrigo Millar | 1 |
| Arturo Vidal | 1 |
| Gary Medel | 1 |
| Juan Delgado | 1 |
| Jean Beausejour | 1 |
| Mauricio Pinilla | 1 |
| Marcelo Díaz | 1 |
| Carlos Muñoz | 1 |
| Miiko Albornoz | 1 |
