= Israel Tentory =

Mexican politician

- Born: 25 October 1957 (age 68); Carácuaro, Michoacán, Mexico
- Occupation: Politician
- Political party: PRD

Israel Tentory García (born 25 October 1957) is a Mexican politician affiliated with the Party of the Democratic Revolution (PRD). In the 2003 mid-terms he was elected to the Chamber of Deputies to represent Michoacán's 11th district during the 59th session of Congress.
