= Monte Grande (disambiguation) =

Monte Grande is a city in Buenos Aires Province, Argentina.

Monte Grande may also refer to:

== Populated places ==
- Monte Grande, part of Ciudad del Plata, San José Department, Uruguay
- Monte Grande, Michoacán, a rancho in Michoacán state, Mexico
- Monte Grande (Fogo), a settlement on the island of Fogo, Cape Verde
- Monte Grande, Cabo Rojo, Puerto Rico
- Montegrande (San Lucas, Michoacan), a hamlet in Mexico

== Mountains ==
- Monte Grande (Sal), on the island of Sal, Cape Verde

== Geology ==
- Monte Grande Formation, a Mesozoic geologic formation in Spain

== See also ==
- Montegrande (archaeological site) in Peru
- Monte Grande (Palma di Montechiaro), Bronze Age archaeological site in Sicily
