= Lagunillas Municipality =

Lagunillas Municipality may refer to:

- Lagunillas Municipality, Bolivia, Bolivia
- Lagunillas Municipality, Michoacán, Mexico
- Lagunillas Municipality, San Luis Potosí, Mexico
- Lagunillas Municipality, Zulia, Venezuela
