= José Alfredo González Díaz =

Mexican politician

- Born: 16 June 1969 (age 56); Michoacán, Mexico
- Occupation: Politician
- Political party: PRD

José Alfredo González Díaz (born 16 June 1969) is a Mexican politician from the Party of the Democratic Revolution (PRD). From 2011 to 2012, during the 61st session of Congress, he sat in the Chamber of Deputies representing Michoacán's 11th district as the alternate of Víctor Manuel Báez Ceja, who resigned his seat on 1 March 2011.
