= Salvador López Orduña =

Mexican politician

- Born: 27 March 1953 (age 73); Morelia, Michoacán, Mexico
- Occupation: Politician
- Political party: PAN (1989–2015)

Salvador López Orduña (born 27 March 1953) is a Mexican politician formerly from the National Action Party (PAN).

He has been elected to the Chamber of Deputies twice: in the 1994 general election, as a plurinominal deputy, and in the 2000 general election, for Michoacán's tenth district.

He also served as mayor of Morelia from 1996 to 1998 and again from 2005 to 2007. He ran for the governorship of Michoacán in 2007.

He resigned from the PAN in March 2015.

== See also ==
- List of municipal presidents of Morelia
