= 8th federal electoral district of Michoacán =

Federal electoral district of Mexico

Michoacán's 8th
- Electoral district of the Chamber of Deputies of Mexico

- 8th district since 2023

Incumbent
- Member: Ernesto Núñez Aguilar
- Party: ▌Ecologist Green Party
- Congress: 66th (2024–2027)

District
- State: Michoacán
- Head town: Morelia
- Coordinates: 19°46′N 101°11′W
- Covers: Municipality of Morelia (part)
- PR region: Fifth
- Precincts: 169
- Population: 424,851 (2020 census)

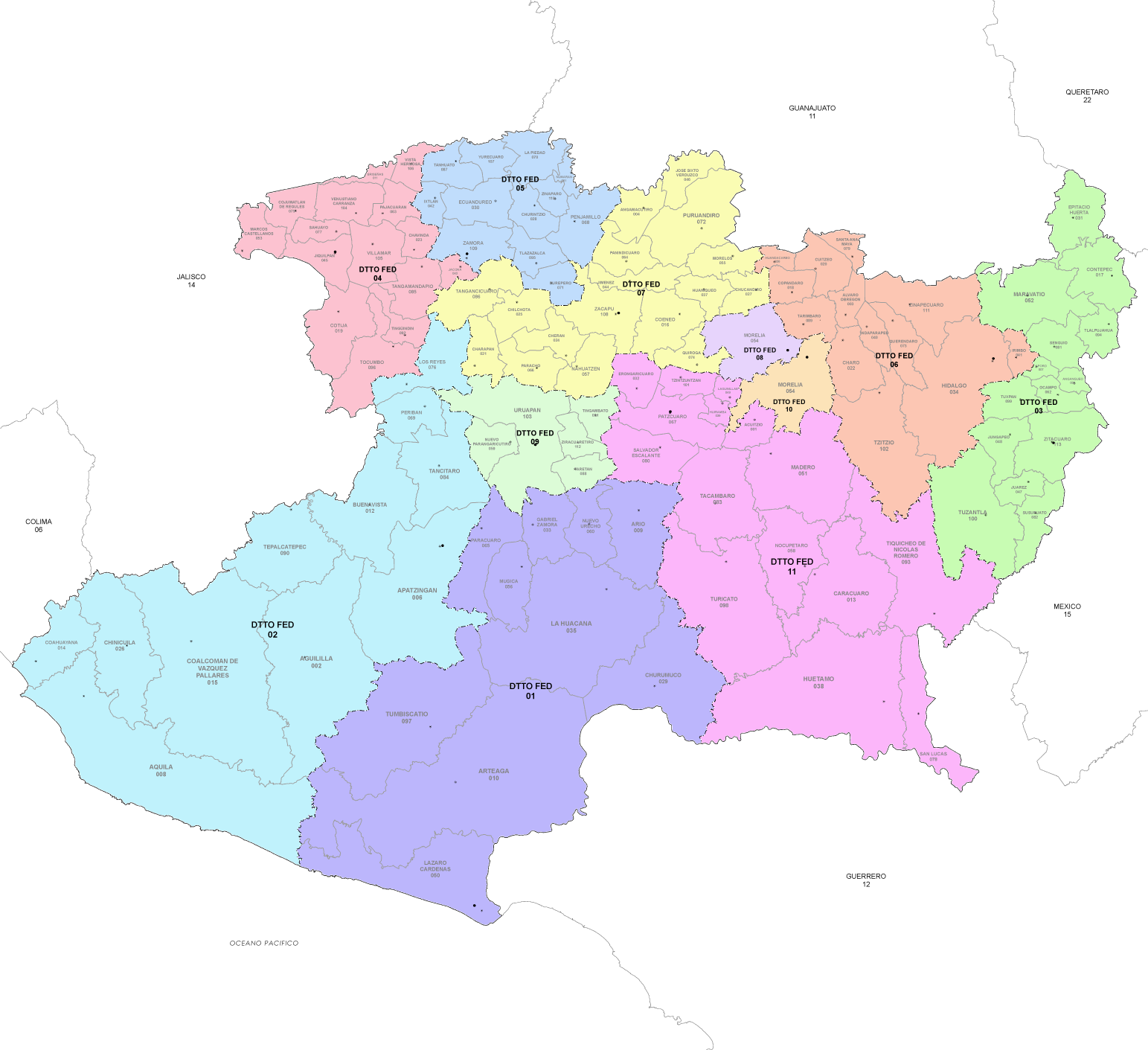
Michoacán's federal electoral districts since 2023

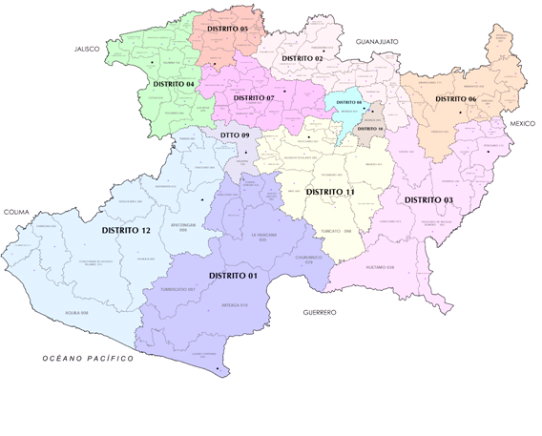
Michoacán under the 2017–2022 districting scheme

The 8th federal electoral district of Michoacán (Spanish: Distrito electoral federal 08 de Michoacán) is one of the 300 electoral districts into which Mexico is divided for elections to the federal Chamber of Deputies and one of 11 such districts in the state of Michoacán.

It elects one deputy to the lower house of Congress for each three-year legislative session by means of the first-past-the-post system. Votes cast in the district also count towards the calculation of proportional representation ("plurinominal") deputies elected from the fifth region.

The current member for the district, elected in the 2024 general election, is Ernesto Núñez Aguilar of the Ecologist Green Party of Mexico (PVEM).

== District territory ==
Michoacán lost its 12th district in the 2023 districting process carried out by the National Electoral Institute (INE). Under the new districting plan, which is to be used for the 2024, 2027 and 2030 federal elections, the 8th district covers 169 precincts (secciones electorales) in the north-west sector of the municipality of Morelia. (Note: The remainder of the municipality makes up the 10th district.)

The head town (cabecera distrital), where results from individual polling stations are gathered together and tallied, is the state capital, the city of Morelia. The district reported a population of 424,851 in the 2020 census.

== Previous districting schemes ==
Evolution of electoral district numbers
	1974	1978	1996	2005	2017	2023
Michoacán	9	13	13	12	12	11
Chamber of Deputies	196	300				

2017–2022

Between 2017 and 2022, the district's head town was at Morelia and it comprised 130 precincts in the north-west of the municipality of Morelia.

2005–2017

Under the 2005 districting plan, Michoacán lost its 13th district. The 8th district's head town was at Morelia and it covered 145 precincts in the north and west of the municipality.

1996–2005

Under the 1996 districting plan, the district's head town was at Morelia and it covered the northern portion of the municipality.

1978–1996

The districting scheme in force from 1978 to 1996 was the result of the 1977 electoral reforms, which increased the number of single-member seats in the Chamber of Deputies from 196 to 300. Under the reforms, Michoacán's allocation rose from 9 to 13. The 8th district's head town was at Zitácuaro and it comprised nine municipalities in the east of the state:
- Angangueo, Aporo, Contepec, Epitacio Huerta, Maravatío, Ocampo, Senguio, Tlalpujahua and Zitácuaro.

== Deputies returned to Congress ==
(Mexico) National parties
- Current
- PAN
- PRI
- PT
- PVEM
- MC
- Morena
- PAZ
- Somos
- Defunct or local only
- PLM
- PNR
- PRM
- PNM
- PP
- PPS
- PARM
- PFCRN
- CON
- PANAL
- PSD
- PES
- PES
- PRD

Michoacán's 8th district
Election	Deputy	Party	Term	Legislature
1916	Pascual Ortiz Rubio; Manuel Martínez Solórzano		1916–1917	Constituent Congress of Querétaro
...
1973	Francisco Valdez Zaragoza	Institutional Revolutionary Party	1973–1976	49th Congress
1976	Héctor Terán Torres	Institutional Revolutionary Party	1976–1979	50th Congress
1979	Luis Coq Guichard	Institutional Revolutionary Party	1979–1982	51st Congress
1982	Ignacio Olvera Quintero	Institutional Revolutionary Party	1982–1985	52nd Congress
1985	Abimael López Castillo	Institutional Revolutionary Party	1985–1988	53rd Congress
1988	Hiram Rivera Teja	Popular Socialist Party (Mexico)	1988–1991	54th Congress
1991	José Ascención Orihuela Bárcenas	Institutional Revolutionary Party	1991–1994	55th Congress
1994	Fernando Orihuela Carmona	Institutional Revolutionary Party	1994–1997	56th Congress
1997	Juan Antonio Prats García	Party of the Democratic Revolution	1997–2000	57th Congress
2000	Sergio Acosta Salazar	Party of the Democratic Revolution	2000–2003	58th Congress
2003	Ana Lilia Guillén Quiroz	Party of the Democratic Revolution	2003–2006	59th Congress
2006	Daniel Chávez García (Note: Chávez García resigned his seat on 10 February 2009.); Susana Sarahí Carrasco Cárdenas	National Action Party (Mexico)	2006–2009; 2009	60th Congress
2009	Alfonso Martínez Alcázar (Note: Martínez Alcázar resigned his seat on 12 August 2011.); Iridia Salazar Blanco	National Action Party (Mexico)	2009–2011; 2011–2012	61st Congress
2012	Eligio Cuitláhuac González Farías	Institutional Revolutionary Party	2012–2015	62nd Congress
2015	Marco Polo Aguirre Chávez (Note: Aguirre Chávez resigned his seat on 31 January 2018.); Fernando Castro Ventura	Institutional Revolutionary Party	2015–2018; 2018	63rd Congress
2018	Ana Lilia Guillén Quiroz	National Regeneration Movement	2018–2021	64th Congress
2021	Roberto Carlos López García	Institutional Revolutionary Party	2021–2024	65th Congress
2024	Ernesto Núñez Aguilar	Ecologist Green Party of Mexico	2024–2027	66th Congress

== Presidential elections ==
Michoacán's 8th district
Election	District won by	Party or coalition	%
2018	Andrés Manuel López Obrador	Juntos Haremos Historia	54.1287
2024	Claudia Sheinbaum Pardo	Sigamos Haciendo Historia	51.7906
