= Francisco Márquez Tinoco =

Mexican politician

- Born: 4 November 1960 (age 65); Michoacán, Mexico
- Occupation: Politician
- Political party: PRD

Francisco Márquez Tinoco (born 4 November 1960) is a Mexican politician affiliated with the Party of the Democratic Revolution (PRD). In the 2006 general election he was elected to the Chamber of Deputies to represent Michoacán's 11th district during the 60th session of Congress.
