= Eligio González Farías =

Mexican politician

- Born: 22 July 1977 (age 48); Morelia, Michoacán, Mexico
- Occupation: Deputy
- Political party: PRI
- Website: http://eligiogonzalezfarias.com/

Eligio Cuitláhuac González Farías (born 22 July 1977) is a Mexican politician affiliated with the Institutional Revolutionary Party (PRI). In the 2012 general election he was elected to the Chamber of Deputies to represent Michoacán's eighth district during the 62nd session of Congress.
