= Blanca Estela Piña Gudiño =

Mexican politician

Senator of the Congress of the Union for Michoacán
- Incumbent
- Assumed office 1 September 2018 Serving with Cristóbal Arias Solís and Antonio García Conejo
- Preceded by: Ascensión Orihuela Bárcenas

Personal details
- Born: 28 December 1955 (age 70)
- Party: Morena
- Occupation: Teacher, politician

Blanca Estela Piña Gudiño (born 28 December 1955) is a Mexican teacher and politician. She is part of the National Regeneration Movement, she was elected Senator to the Union Congress in First Formula for the state of Michoacán for the period that began on September 1, 2018.

== Biography ==
She is a retired teacher of basic education of the federal system, in artistic and cultural activities. She is also a folk music performer and social fighter in the state.

In the 2014-2015 electoral process, she was a candidate for MORENA multi-member deputy for the V constituency. As of that year, she served as Secretary of Art and Culture of the current State Executive Committee of MORENA in Michoacán.

The political institute to which she belongs chose her as a candidate for the Senate through a survey to participate in the 2018 federal elections in Mexico by proportional representation and by federal entity. When winning the first formula of the state of Michoacán, she by law had to leave the multinominal numbering.

In the LXIV Legislature in the Senate of the Republic, she was appointed secretary of the Commission for Gender Equality, she is also a member of the Development and Social Welfare, Education, Labor and Social Welfare and Culture commissions.
