= Victoria Méndez Márquez =

Mexican politician

- Born: 26 March 1961 (age 65); Morelia, Michoacán, Mexico
- Occupation: Politician
- Political party: PRI

Victoria Eugenia Méndez Márquez (born 26 March 1961) is a Mexican politician affiliated with the Institutional Revolutionary Party (PRI).

In 2004–2006 she served in the Senate during the latter part of the 59th session of Congress representing Michoacán as the alternate of Netzahualcóyotl de la Vega. In the 1994 general election she was elected to the Chamber of Deputies to represent Michoacán's tenth district during the 56th session.
