= Villa Madero =

Municipality in Michoacán, Mexico

Coordinates: 19.3904678°N 101.282109°W

- Municipality
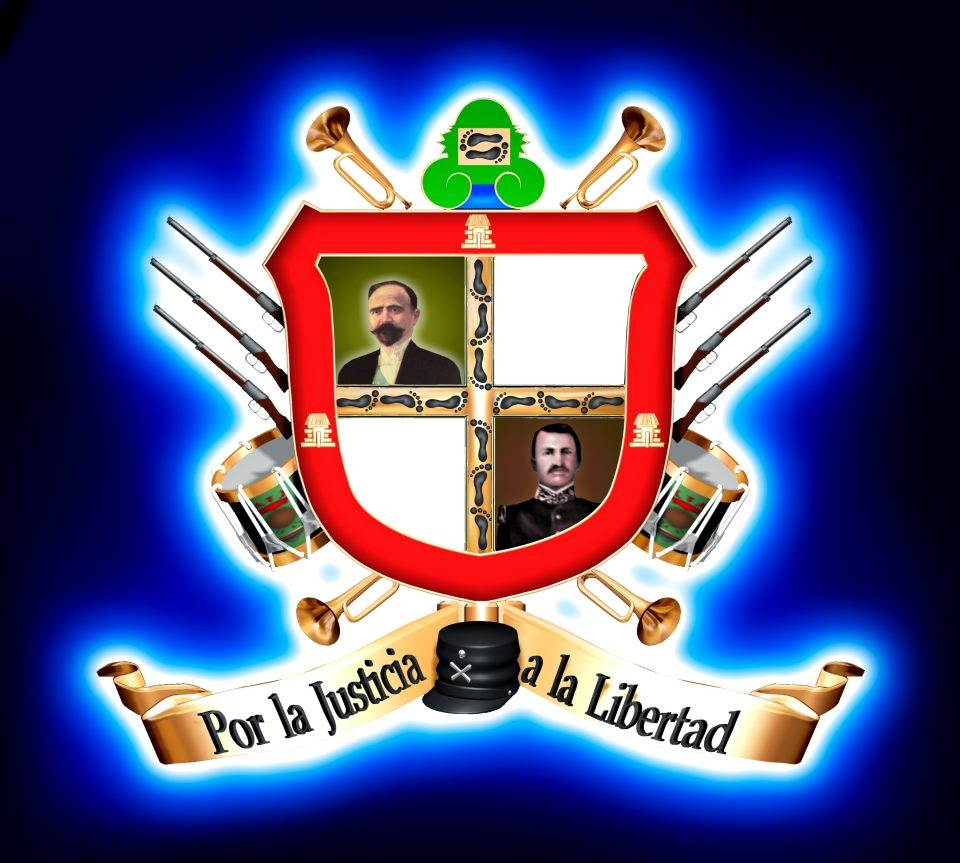
- Coat of arms

- Location in Mexico Villa Madero (Mexico)
- Country: Mexico
- State: Michoacán
- Demonym: (in Spanish)
- Time zone: UTC−6 (CST)

The town of Villa Madero is a municipal seat in the municipality of Madero in the Mexican state of Michoacán. It was established in 1868 with the name of Cruz de Caminos. According to tradition the first inhabitant of the place was a man named Armas, he is now considered the town's founder. The land where the town currently sits belonged to La Hacienda De La Concepcion. The village is the point of intersection of the paths that lead to Acuitzio, Etucuaro, Curuchancio and Tacambaro, this is why it became known as Cruz De Caminos (Cross Roads).

Cruz de Caminos, was in 1901 part of Acuitzio Del Canje. On July 27, 1914, Cruz de Caminos applied to become a municipality. On October 12, 1914, the agreement to elevate it to a municipality with the name of Madero was ratified. It was named after Francisco I. Madero.

Villa Madero hosts an annual festival named "La Feria del Mezcal". This is about a traditional beverage "mezcal" produced in Etucuaro, a town that is part of the Madero municipality. During this festival, producers give free samples of their product. There are also traditional food stands, different sports activities, a parade and at night people gather in a ballroom to dance with live music.

Villa Madero used to be surrounded by pine forests, but as of 2022 is battling illegal logging, deforestation, encroachment by avocado growers, and depleted water tables. An attempt to institute citizen patrols such as was successful in Cherán was foiled by the Mexican drug cartel. Local farm families are having to haul in water because the avocado growers have diverted streams to water their orchards.

== See also ==
- Municipalities of Michoacán
