= María Santos Gorrostieta Salazar =

Mexican physician and politician

- Born: 1976; Tiquicheo, Michoacán, Mexico
- Died: c. 15 November 2012 (aged 36); Michoacán, Mexico
- Cause of death: Assassination
- Body discovered: near Morelia, Michoacán
- Education: Universidad Michoacana de San Nicolás de Hidalgo
- Occupations: Politician, physician
- Political party: Institutional Revolutionary Party (2008–2010); Party of the Democratic Revolution (2010–2012)

María Santos Gorrostieta Salazar (1976 – c. 15 November 2012) was a Mexican politician who served as mayor of Tiquicheo, in Michoacán, from 2008 to 2011. Despite three assassination attempts during her tenure, she continued to be outspoken against organized crime. In a fourth attack, she was kidnapped and assassinated by suspected drug traffickers on 15 November 2012. Michoacán was home to several violent drug trafficking organizations such as La Familia Michoacana and the Knights Templar Cartel. Gorrostieta, a physician, had been a member of the PRI and left it for lack of support after the attacks. She had then become a member of the PRD.

== Career ==
Gorrostieta Salazar was born in 1976 in Tiquicheo, a small town in the state of Michoacán, Mexico. She attended the Universidad Michoacana de San Nicolás de Hidalgo in Morelia and earned a PhD in medicine.

She began her political career by joining the Institutional Revolutionary Party (PRI), and from 2008 to 2011, she served as the mayor of Tiquicheo. While in office, she survived three assassination attempts. She ran for the Chamber of Deputies of the Congress of the Union, but she did not get elected and returned to her office as mayor. After some differences with the PRI, which had urged her to resign, Gorrostieta Salazar left the party and joined the Party of the Democratic Revolution (PRD) in August 2010. She said her Catholic faith influenced her approach to her duties as a politician. She has been described as a "heroine of the 21st century" for her opposition to Mexico's drug cartels and for refusing to take bribes.

She had three children with her first husband, José Sánchez Chávez. After he was killed in the October 2009 attack, Gorrostieta Salazar later married Nereo Patiño Delgado. (Note: Nereo Patiño Delgado is the former bodyguard of Gorrostieta Salazar, assigned by the governor Leonel Godoy Rangel after the 2010 attack. They married in 2011, but Gorrostieta Salazar eventually separated from her husband.)

== Assassination attempts ==
=== Background ===
In 2008, Gorrostieta Salazar was elected mayor of Tiquicheo. Several drug trafficking organizations, particularly the La Familia Michoacana and the Knights Templar Cartel, are based in the area. Michoacán is a leading producer of marijuana and opium poppy, making it a lucrative route for smugglers taking narcotics into the United States. Despite receiving threats, Gorrostieta Salazar publicly denounced the activities of these groups. The drug cartels, which are constantly fighting each other for territorial control, often target mayors who confront them. Other mayors, however, are corrupted and bribed by the cartels. Mexico has more than 2,500 municipalities, many of which are far from the capital cities and lack amenities available in other parts of the country. Many of these areas are plagued with drug-related violence, so the political parties have faced difficulties finding people interested in holding the post of mayor.

It was in Michoacán that Felipe Calderón launched the country's first military-led operation in the ongoing drug war, just ten days after he took office on 11 December 2006. The military campaign spread to other states in Mexico, eventually including over 50,000 federal agents. After years of past administrations taking a passive stance against the drug cartels, Calderón had decided it was time for the government to "flex its muscles." Violence exploded in Michoacán and across the country, leaving a death toll of about 60,000 (perhaps even more than 100,000) in six years. (Note: By the end of Calderón's administration (2006–2012), the official death toll of the Mexican Drug War was at least 60,000, although unconfirmed accounts set the homicide rate above 100,000 victims, given the large number of people who have disappeared.) Numerous journalists and mayors have been killed since the start of the drug war, and some members of the Mexican Armed Forces and the Federal police have been accused of human rights abuses and causing forced disappearances. The organized crime groups have diversified their criminal agendas, no longer focusing solely on drug trafficking; many of them operate kidnapping rings and extortion and protection rackets, and engage in piracy, and human trafficking. The cartels in Michoacán force the local population to pay for "protection", spy, and report suspicious activities and law enforcement presence.

Calderón argued that if he had not acted, Mexico would have become a "narco-state," where the drug trafficking organizations impose law at their will. "I am sure that the Mexicans of tomorrow will remember these days as the moment when the country took the decision to defend itself, with all its force, against a voracious criminal phenomenon of transnational dimensions," Calderón said on 20 November 2012 at a ceremony for fallen soldiers. His successor, Enrique Peña Nieto, has pledged to continue the fight, but plans to adjust the strategy to reduce the level of violence.

=== 2009 attacks ===
In January 2008, three months after Gorrostieta Salazar took office, she and her husband were travelling near the rural community of Las Mojarras when an automobile ran them off the road. In that incident, the gunmen only threatened Gorrostieta Salazar by shooting in the air and warning her to resign "before it was too late." On 16 January 2009, in the rural area of El Limón de Papatzindán, the couple was attacked by armed assailants and received minor injuries that did not prevent them from continuing their public lives. The next attack occurred on 15 October 2009, when Gorrostieta Salazar was ambushed while driving through El Limón de Papatzindán with her husband. A group of armed men opened fire on Sánchez Chávez when he left the vehicle to make a phone call. Gorrostieta Salazar ran to protect her husband and was shot as well. Sánchez Chávez died that day from three gunshot wounds, but Gorrostieta Salazar survived because the gunmen believed she was dead.

A few months later, Gorrostieta Salazar announced that she was still willing to work and returned to her duties as mayor. By then, she contacted the leaders of the PRI to ask for protection, but she encountered difficulties, including unanswered phone calls.

=== 2010 attack ===
On 23 January 2010, Gorrostieta Salazar was attacked by armed men in Ciudad Altamirano, Guerrero, while returning from a local event with four other people. Severely injured by bullet wounds in the abdomen, chest, and leg, she was taken to a local hospital. Also injured were the driver of the vehicle, who was shot twice; Marbella Reyes Ortoño, head of the Institute of Women in Tiquicheo; and Fanny Almazán Gómez, a journalist from El Sol de Morelia. In addition to the bullet wounds, Gorrostieta Salazar suffered further injuries when the vehicle crashed after the shooting. Her wounds left her in constant pain and she had to use a colostomy bag, but she refused to resign her post as mayor. She publicly displayed her wounds in photographs published in an issue of Contacto Ciudadano magazine, and repeated her statement that she would continue her work.

"I wanted to show you my wounded, mutilated, humiliated body because I am not ashamed of it, because it is the result of the misfortunes that have marked my life ... it is the living testimony that I am a whole and strong woman, who, despite my physical and mental wounds, continues to stand."

— Gorrostieta Salazar's comments about the photographs

Gorrostieta Salazar left the PRI and joined the PRD in August 2010, stating that the PRI had not supported her after the attacks. She ran for election to the National Congress with the PRD, but failed to get elected. At the end of her term as mayor, Gorrostieta Salazar retired from politics. She returned to private life, remarried, and dedicated her time to raise her three children: Malusi, José, and Deysi. Her police protection came to an end when her mayoral term expired in 2011.

== Assassination ==
On 12 November 2012, Gorrostieta Salazar was driving her daughter to school in Morelia at around 8:30 a.m. when a vehicle ran them off the road. Two armed men descended from their vehicle and forced her out of her car as onlookers watched. Gorrostieta Salazar pleaded with her abductors to let her daughter go unharmed, and then agreed to go with the kidnappers. The family of the former mayor initially thought it was a ransom kidnapping. After not hearing from Gorrostieta Salazar or her abductors for two days, they notified the police. (Note: This course of action is a common practice in Mexico, where most kidnappings go unreported because citizens tend to distrust the police. Popular belief holds that police officers are often involved with the cartels or are unable to solve such crimes. This practice is also rooted in the fear that calling the authorities may compel the captors to kill the victim.) On 15 November, police identified the body after farm workers from the rural community of San Juan Tararameo in Cuitzeo found the corpse on their way to work.

Post-mortem reports indicated that she died of a traumatic brain injury, the result of severe blows to the head. The governor of Michoacán said that organized crime was undoubtedly involved. Gorrostieta Salazar was buried alongside her husband José Sánchez Chávez in a tomb at a local cemetery in Tiquicheo, her hometown.
