= Carácuaro =

- Municipality
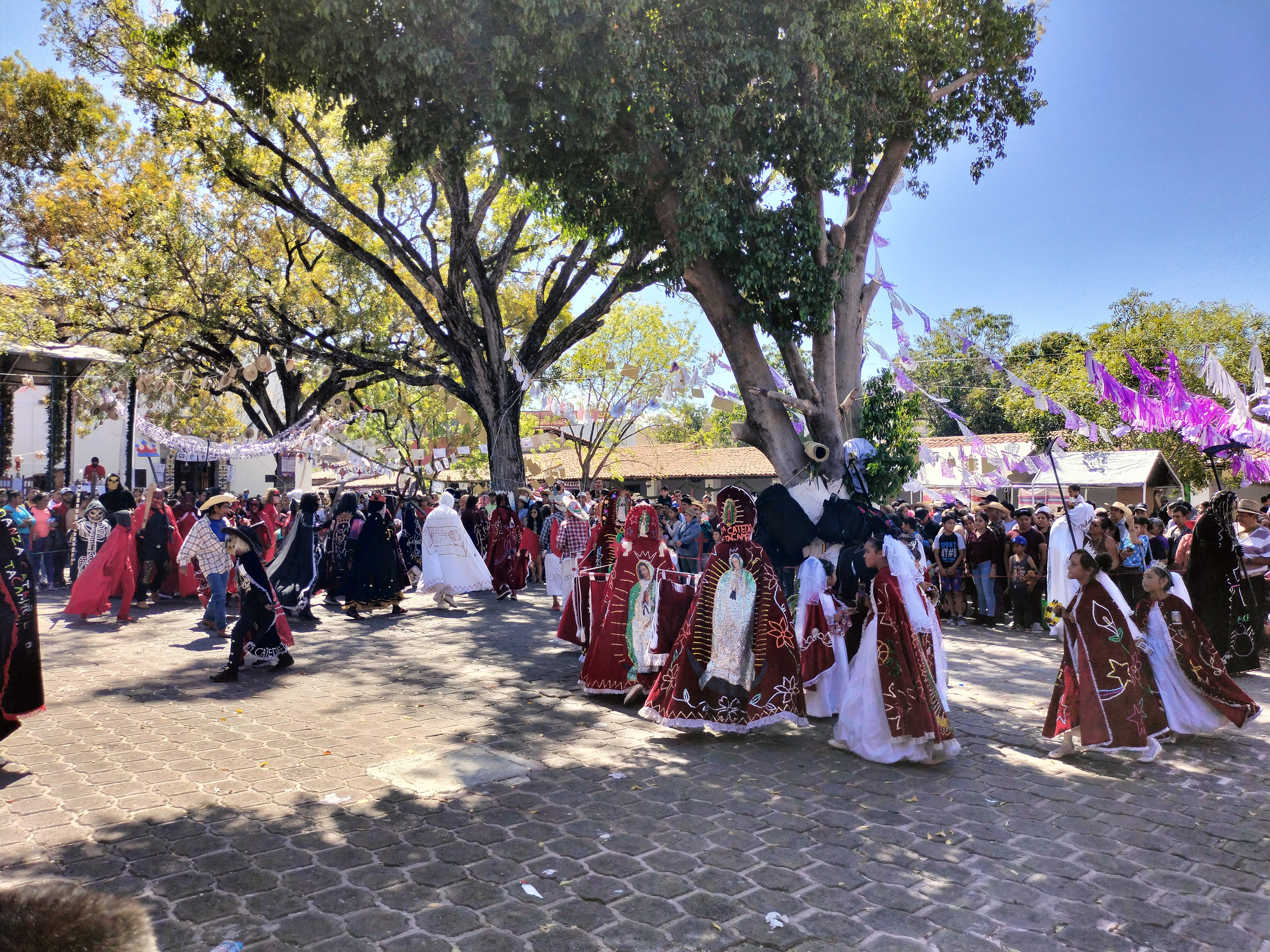
- Atrium at Saint Augustine's Church in Carácuaro

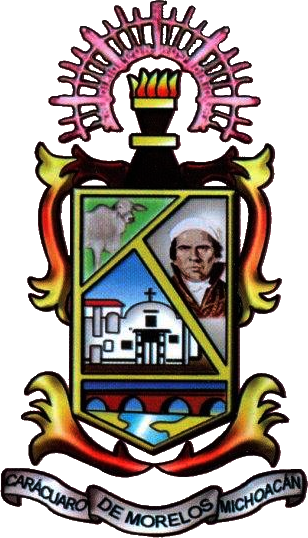
- Coat of arms

- Location in Mexico
- Coordinates: 19°01′00″N 101°07′34″W
- Country: Mexico
- State: Michoacán
- Established: 1 February 1856
- Seat: Carácuaro de Morelos

Government
  - President: Walter Gómez Gutiérrez

Area
  - Total: 920.855 km^{2} (355.544 sq mi)
- Elevation (of seat): 538 m (1,765 ft)

Population (2010 Census)
  - Total: 9,212
  - Estimate (2015 Intercensal Survey): 9,485
  - Density: 10.00/km^{2} (25.91/sq mi)
  - Seat: 3,653
- Time zone: UTC-6 (Central)
- Postal codes: 61920–61938
- Area code: 459
- Website: Official website

Carácuaro is a municipality in the Mexican state of Michoacán, located 77 kilometres (48 mi) south of the state capital of Morelia.

== Geography ==
The municipality of Carácuaro is located in the Tierra Caliente region of Michoacán at an altitude between 400 and 1,600 metres (1,300–5,200 ft). It borders the municipalities of Nocupétaro to the west, Madero to the north, Tiquicheo to the east, Huetamo to the south and Turicato to the southwest. The municipality covers an area of 920.855 square kilometres (355.544 sq mi) and comprises 1.6% of the state's area.

Carácuaro is located in the southern foothills of the Trans-Mexican Volcanic Belt, in the Balsas River basin. Tropical forests of parota and tepeguaje cover 66% of the municipality.

Carácuaro's climate is tropical with rain in the summer. Average temperatures in the municipality range between 22 and 28 °C (72–82 °F), and average annual precipitation ranges between 700 and 1,000 millimetres (28–39 in).

== History ==
Prior to the arrival of the Spanish, Carácuaro was a small Chichimeca village. The place name derives from the Chichimeca word carakua, "place of the slope" or "place on the slope." The Spanish founded a mission in Carácuaro in 1581. Originally a meat production centre for the towns of the Bajío, it eventually became a centre of tropical fruit and sugarcane cultivation. José María Morelos served as the parish priest from 1799 until 1810, when he joined the rebels in the Mexican War of Independence. Carácuaro's significance declined after the war, despite it becoming a municipality on 1 February 1856. After the Mexican Revolution, emigration to central Mexico and the United States became common.

== Administration ==
The municipal government comprises a president, a councillor (Spanish: síndico), and seven trustees (regidores), four elected by relative majority and three by proportional representation. The current president of the municipality is Walter Gómez Gutiérrez.

== Demographics ==
In the 2010 Mexican Census, the municipality of Carácuaro recorded a population of 9212 inhabitants living in 2238 households. The 2015 Intercensal Survey estimated a population of 9485 inhabitants in Carácuaro.

There are 176 localities in the municipality, of which only the municipal seat, known as Carácuaro de Morelos, is classified as urban. It recorded a population of 3653 inhabitants in the 2010 Census.

== Economy ==
The main economic activities in Carácuaro are farming and livestock production. The main crops grown are corn and sesame, while beef cattle and pigs are the main livestock raised.

== Culture ==
The Señor de Carácuaro or the Black Christ of Carácuaro is a large dark-coloured statue of Christ in the church of Saint Augustine. Many miracles have been attributed to it and it is the destination of a popular pilgrimage route from Tacámbaro that takes place in the week around Ash Wednesday.

The house where José María Morelos lived has been preserved as a library.
