= Pablo Antonio Villanueva Ramírez =

Mexican politician

- Born: 29 June 1957 (age 68); Morelia, Michoacán, Mexico
- Occupation: Politician
- Political party: PAN

Pablo Antonio Villanueva Ramírez (born 29 June 1957) is a Mexican politician affiliated with the National Action Party (PAN). In the 2003 mid-terms he was elected to the Chamber of Deputies to represent Michoacán's tenth district during the 61st session of Congress.
