= List of municipal presidents of Morelia =

The following is a list of municipal presidents of Morelia Municipality in the state of Michoacán, Mexico. The municipality includes the city of Morelia.

== List of officials ==
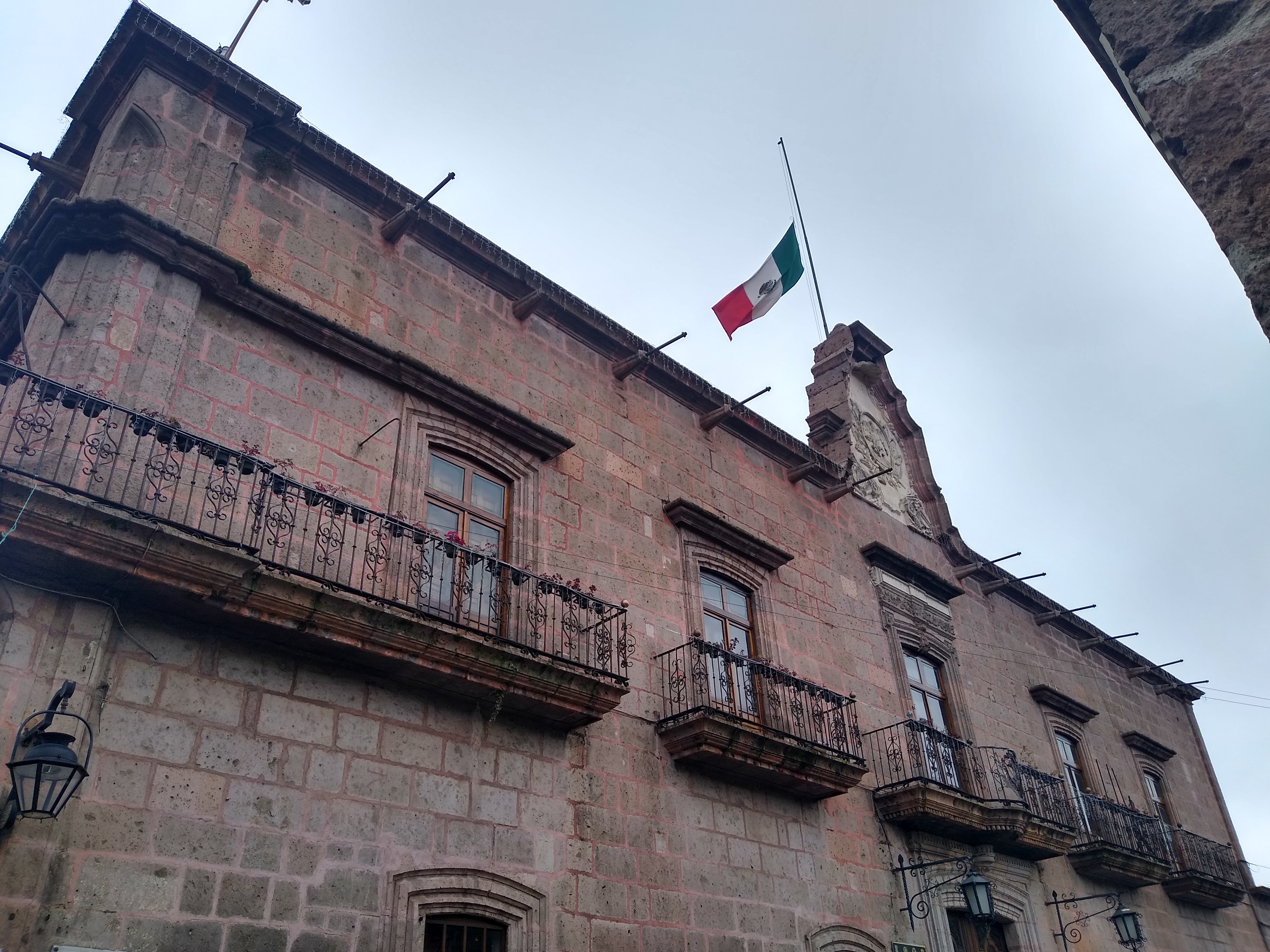
Palacio municipal, Morelia (photo 2019)

- Rafael García de León, 1951-1952
- Enrique Bravo Valencia, 1953
- Alfonso Martínez Serrano, 1954-1956
- Esteban Figueroa Ojeda, 1957-1959
- Alberto Cano Díaz, 1960-1962
- Fernando Ochoa Ponce de León, 1963-1965
- Alfonso Martínez Serrano, 1966-1968
- Melchor Díaz Rubio, 1969-1970
- Socorro Navarro, 1970-1971
- Marco Antonio Aguilar Cortés, 1972-1974
- Ignacio Gálvez Rocha, 1975-1977
- José Berber Sánchez, 1978-1980
- Rafael Ruiz Béjar, 1981-1983
- Roberto Robles Garnica, 1984-1986
- Germán Ireta Alas, 1987-1989
- Samuel Maldonado Bautista, 1990-1992
- Sergio Magaña Martínez, 1993
- Fausto Vallejo, 1993–1995, 2002–2004, 2008–2011
- Salvador López Orduña, 1996–1998, 2005-2007
- Salvador Galván Infante, 1999-2001
- Augusto Caire Arriaga, 2001 (interim)
- María del Rocío Pineda Gochi, 2011
- Tiznado Manuel Nocetti, 2012 (provisional)
- Wilfrido Lázaro Medina, 2013-2015
- Salvador Abud Mirabent, 2015 (interim)
- Alfonso Martínez Alcázar, 2015-2018, 2021–current
- Raúl Morón Orozco, 2018-2021

== See also ==
- Morelia Municipality
- Michoacán state election, 2018
- History of Morelia
