= Sergio Magaña Martínez =

Mexican politician

- Born: 2 December 1949; Morelia, Michoacán, Mexico
- Died: 25 December 2017 (aged 68)
- Occupation: Politician
- Political party: PRI (1993–2001); PRD (2003–2017)

Sergio Augusto Magaña Martínez (2 December 1949 – 25 December 2017) was a Mexican politician affiliated with the Party of the Democratic Revolution (formerly to the Institutional Revolutionary Party). From 2014 to 2017 he served as Deputy of the LIX Legislature of the Mexican Congress as a plurinominal representative and as Senator of the LVI and LVII Legislatures.

He also was Mayor of Morelia from 1993 to 1994.

== See also ==
- List of municipal presidents of Morelia
