= Alfredo Anaya Gudiño =

Mexican politician

- Born: 8 November 1950 (age 75); Michoacán, Mexico
- Occupation: Deputy
- Political party: PRI

Alfredo Anaya Gudiño (born 8 November 1950) is a Mexican politician affiliated with the Institutional Revolutionary Party (PRI).

In the 2003 mid-terms he was elected to the Chamber of Deputies to represent Michoacán's 11th district during the 55th session of Congress. In the 2012 general election he returned to the Chamber of Deputies as a plurinominal deputy for the fifth electoral region.
