= Susana Carrasco Cárdenas =

Mexican politician

- Born: 25 May 1979 (age 46); Michoacán, Mexico
- Occupation: Politician
- Political party: PAN

Susana Sarahí Carrasco Cárdenas (born 25 May 1979) is a Mexican politician from the National Action Party (PAN). In 2009 she sat in the Chamber of Deputies to represent Michoacán's eighth district as the alternate of Daniel Chávez García, who resigned his seat on 10 February 2009.
