= Ernesto Núñez Aguilar =

Mexican politician

- Born: 28 February 1979 (age 47); Michoacán, Mexico
- Occupation: Deputy
- Political party: PVEM
- Website: http://ernestonuñez.com/

Ernesto Núñez Aguilar (born 28 February 1979) is a Mexican politician affiliated with the Ecologist Green Party of Mexico (PVEM).

In the 2012 general election he was elected to the Chamber of Deputies to represent Michoacán's tenth district during the 62nd session of Congress. He returned to Congress in the 2024 general election to represent the state's eighth district during the 66th session.
