= Cristóbal Arias Solís =

Mexican politician

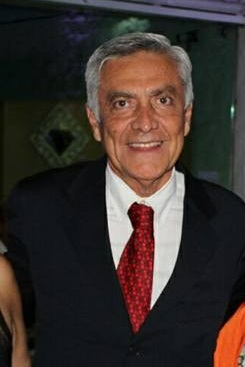
- Arias Solís in 2018

Senator of the Congress of the Union for Michoacán
- Incumbent
- Assumed office 5 July 2021 Serving with Blanca Estela Piña Gudiño and Antonio García Conejo
- Preceded by: José Alfonso Solórzano Fraga
- In office 1 September 2018 – 21 January 2021
- Preceded by: Rocío Pineda Gochi
- Succeeded by: José Alfonso Solórzano Fraga
- In office 1 November 1994 – 31 August 2000
- In office 1 September 1988 – 31 August 1991

Personal details
- Born: 10 August 1954 (age 71) Churumuco, Michoacán, Mexico
- Party: Morena (since 2018)
- Other political affiliations: PRI (until 1988); PRD (1988–2018)
- Education: Universidad Michoacana de San Nicolás de Hidalgo
- Occupation: Politician

Cristóbal Arias Solís (born 10 August 1954) is a Mexican lawyer and politician, belonging to the National Regeneration Movement (Morena). He has been a senator of the Republic three times: from 1988 to 1991, 1994 to 2000, and from 2018 to 2021. He also served as a federal deputy from 1982 to 1985 and from 1991 to 1994. He has been a candidate for governor of Michoacán on three occasions for the Party of the Democratic Revolution and the Fuerza por México alliance. Since 5 July 2021, he is a senator to the Congress of the Union for Michoacán.

== Biography ==
Born in Churumuco, Michoacán, he studied law at the Faculty of Law and Social Sciences of the Michoacana University of San Nicolás de Hidalgo.

== Political career ==
During Cuauhtémoc Cárdenas's tenure as governor of Michoacán, Cristóbal Arias served as head of the state's Government Secretariat. In 1982 he was elected to the Chamber of Deputies for the Michoacán's 7th district during the 52nd session of Congress until 1985.

In 1988 together with the Democratic Current, he resigned from the Institutional Revolutionary Party and ran for the National Democratic Front to contend for a seat in the Senate of the Republic for the state of Michoacán in the 1988 federal elections; he was elected as one of the first opposition senators in the modern history of the country. He later he formally joined the newly founded Party of the Democratic Revolution.

In 1991 he was elected a PRD proportional representation federal deputy for the state of Jalisco.

He participated as a candidate for governor in the 1992 Michoacán state elections, coming in second place behind the PRI candidate, Eduardo Villaseñor Peña. The PRD denounced fraud on the part of the PRI government and, in the midst of massive mobilizations, Governor Villaseñor resigned only 21 days after taking office.

In the 1994 federal elections, he was elected to the Senate for the second time.

Due to the death of the constitutional governor Eduardo Villaseñor, the electoral process was brought forward to the 1995 Michoacán state elections. Cristóbal Arias Solís was re-elected to represent the PRD for the government's candidacy after internal difficulties with the pre-candidate Roberto Robles Garnica who alleged fraud and challenged the process.

Once again Arias got second place, beating PAN candidate Felipe Calderón Hinojosa but losing to PRI candidate Víctor Manuel Tinoco Rubí.

In 2001 he supported the candidacy of PRD candidate Lázaro Cárdenas Batel who would become governor. Under the argument that the PRD was no longer an instrument for transformation and social justice, and also ceased to be the opposition, he resigned from the party in a letter dated April 2016.

In March 2018, he became a candidate for senator for the Juntos Haremos Historia alliance headed by Morena, a party founded by Andrés Manuel López Obrador. In the 2018 federal elections in Michoacán, he was elected as a second-formula senator.

In the 64th Congress, he chaired the Government Commission of the Senate of the Republic, structurally the most important in the Upper House.
