= Laura Margarita Suárez =

Mexican politician

- Born: 19 August 1953 (age 72); Michoacán, Mexico
- Occupation: Politician
- Political party: PAN

Laura Margarita Suárez González (born 19 August 1953) is a Mexican politician from the National Action Party (PAN). In the 2009 mid-terms she was elected to the Chamber of Deputies to represent Michoacán's tenth district during the 61st session of Congress.
