= Sergio Acosta Salazar =

Mexican politician

- Born: 10 May 1957 (age 69); Mexico City, Mexico
- Occupation: Politician
- Political party: PRD

Sergio Acosta Salazar (born 10 May 1957) is a Mexican politician from the Party of the Democratic Revolution (PRD). In the 2000 general election he was elected to the Chamber of Deputies to represent Michoacán's eighth district during the 58th session of Congress.
