= Daniel Chávez García =

Mexican politician

- Born: 27 May 1970 (age 55); Michoacán, Mexico
- Occupation: Politician
- Political party: PAN

Daniel Chávez García (born 27 May 1970) is a Mexican politician affiliated with the National Action Party (PAN). In the 2006 general election he was elected to the Chamber of Deputies to represent Michoacán's eighth district during the 60th Congress. He resigned his seat on 10 February 2009 and was replaced for the remainder of his term by his alternate, Susana Sarahí Carrasco Cárdenas.
