= Víctor Manuel Báez Ceja =

Mexican politician

- Born: 29 October 1959 (age 66); Michoacán, Mexico
- Occupation: Politician
- Political party: MORENA

Víctor Manuel Báez Ceja (born 29 October 1959) is a Mexican politician in the National Regeneration Movement (Morena) party. From 2009 to 2011, he served in the Chamber of Deputies during the 61st Congress representing Michoacán's 11th district for the Party of the Democratic Revolution (PRD).

In 2015, Báez, by this point a member of Morena, was elected mayor of Pátzcuaro. He was the first PT-Morena municipal president in the city. In 2018, he won reelection.
