= Montegrande, Michoacán =

Rancho in Michoacán state, Mexico

Coordinates: 18.499139°N 100.778376°W

Montegrande is a hamlet located in the municipality of San Lucas in Michoacán. It has an area of 153.41 square kilometres (0.12% of the surface of the state). To the east it borders the state of Guerrero. It is part of Tierra Caliente (Mexico).

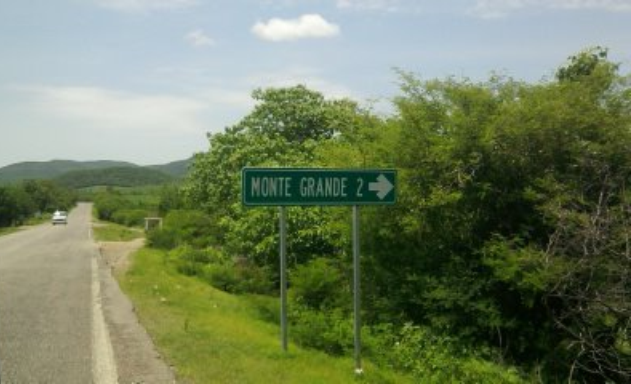
Monte Grande
