= Alfonso Martínez Alcázar =

Mexican politician

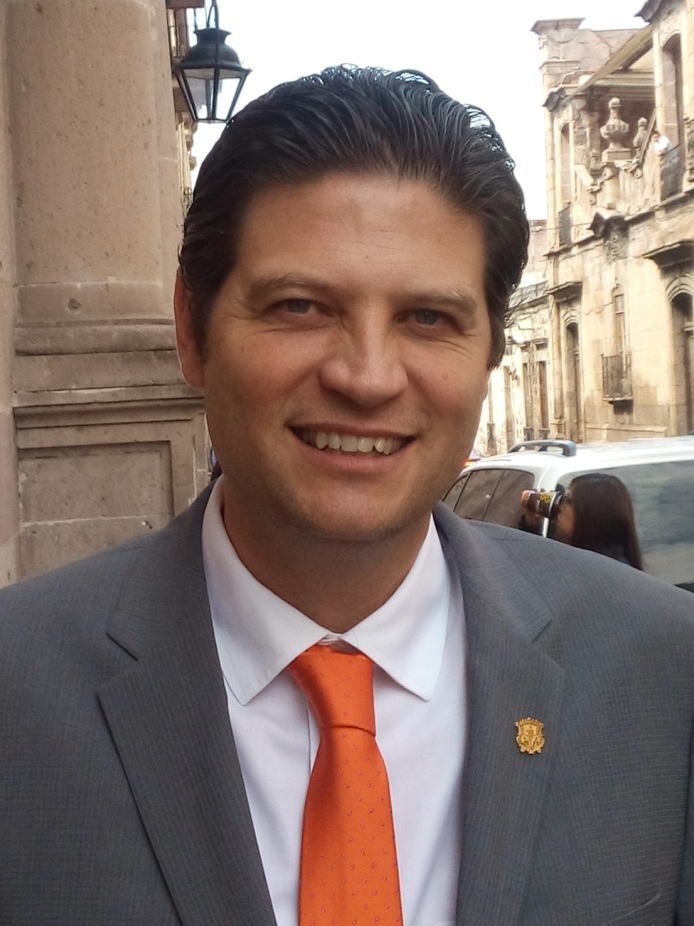
- Born: Alfonso Jesús Martínez Alcázar; 30 January 1975 (age 51); Morelia, Michoacán, Mexico
- Occupation: Politician
- Political party: National Action Party

Alfonso Jesús Martínez Alcázar (born 30 January 1975) is a Mexican politician from the National Action Party (PAN).

In the 2009 mid-terms he was elected to the Chamber of Deputies to represent Michoacán's eighth district during the 61st session of Congress. He resigned his seat on 12 August 2011 and was replaced for the remainder of his term by his alternate, Iridia Salazar Blanco.

== See also ==
- List of municipal presidents of Morelia
