= Acuitzio del Canje, Michoacán =

Acuitzio del Canje
- Town
- Location within Michoacán Location within Mexico
- Coordinates: 19°30′N 101°20′W
- Country: Mexico
- State: Michoacán
- Municipality: Acuitzio
- Elevation: 2,080 m (6,820 ft)

Population (2020)
  - Total: 7,439
- Time zone: UTC-6 (CST)

Acuitzio del Canje is a town in the Mexican state of Michoacán. It serves as the municipal seat for the surrounding municipality of Acuitzio.

The area was originally settled in pre-Hispanic times. By 1620, it was a community of 20 families, with a hospital. In the early years of Mexican independence, an ayuntamiento was established there.

== Name ==
"Acuitzio" is a word of Purépecha origin that means "place of snakes". The epithet "del Canje" (literally: "of the exchange") refers to an exchange of prisoners of war that took place in the town on 5 December 1865, during the French Intervention. On 16 December 1901, the State Congress enacted legislation for Acuitzio's name to be changed to Acuitzio del Canje.
