= Raúl Morón Orozco =

Mexican politician (born 1958)

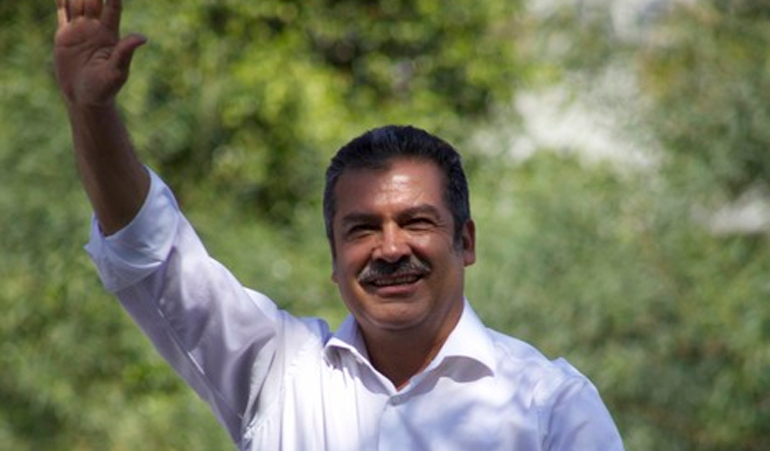
- Born: 25 October 1958 (age 67); Chucándiro, Michoacán, Mexico
- Occupations: Municipal President of Morelia, Michoacán
- Political party: MORENA

Raúl Morón Orozco (born 25 October 1958) is a Mexican politician affiliated with the National Regeneration Movement (MORENA). He served as municipal president (mayor) of Morelia, Michoacán, from 2018 to 2021. He served in the 69th and 71st sessions of the Congress of Michoacán.

He served in the Senate for Michoacán from 2012 to 2018 as a member of the Labour Party (PT).

Morón won re-election as one of Michoacán's senators in the 2024 Senate election, occupying the second place on the Sigamos Haciendo Historia coalition's two-name formula. He is a member of the Morena parliamentary group in the Senate.

== See also ==
- List of municipal presidents of Morelia
