= Lagunillas, Michoacán =

Lagunillas
- Town
- Interactive map of Lagunillas
- Coordinates: 19.8547°N 100.2328°W
- Country: Mexico
- State: Michoacán
- Municipality: Lagunillas

Lagunillas is a town in the Mexican state of Michoacán. It serves as the municipal seat for the surrounding municipality of Lagunillas

== History ==
Lagunillas was established during the colonial period. In the beginning this site was called “Hacienda de Lagunillas”. The town was the center of economic and social life. In 1930, as a result of the Agrarian reforms, Lagunillas received the title of 'town'. On August 8 of 1950 the congress of the town converted Lagunillas as a seat.

== Sociodemographic profile ==
According to the INEGI in 1990 the town had 9 indigenous people, of whom 5 were men and 4 women. In 1990 the population of the town of Lagunillas represented 0.05 per cent of the total of the estate. In 1995 there were 1536 inhabitants reported. The population of Lagunillas has grown 1.5 per cent per year since then. The density of population is 38.3 inhabitants per km^{2}. The number of women is greater than the number of men. This situation is common in some towns in Mexico but in Lagunillas is part of the local culture. migration to the United States began during the second world war and has been steady ever since, as it is still one of the most important forms of income for the local people. During December the population grows three to four times as compared to other months due to the number of migrant workers who come back. In the year 1994, 209 births and 25 deaths were reported for the town. The most commonly practiced religion is Roman Catholicism.

== Economy ==
The main crops in significance order are: corn, kidney bean and alfalfa. It represents 40% of economic activity. Cattle farming represents of economic activity. Livestock, pigs, poultry, bovine, horses and sheep are raised. The town has food and brick manufacture industries that represents 10% of economic activities. Forest exploitation represent 10% of economic activity, pine and encino occupy the forest surface, which is worked. Lagunillas has itself natural landscapes for touristic development. The trade is constitutes by little shops where first and second necessity products are issued. Lagunillas has lodgings and food services, and foreign transport to cover the demand.

== Culture and tourism ==
There are many celebrations, dances and traditions. But the most important is the anniversary of the foundation of the town that takes place on October 5. Art craft are: Talabartería (that consist in the treatment of fur) and Pottery. Gastronomy: Carnitas and nopales prepared in different ways. Weather: The weather is tempered with some rains in summer. It has an annual pluvial precipitation. Temperatures that oscillate of 11, 2 to 38.5°C. Hydrography consists in: the rivers “Prieto” and the river “Cuanajo.”
