= Morelia Municipality =

Morelia Municipality Municipio de Morelia
- Municipality
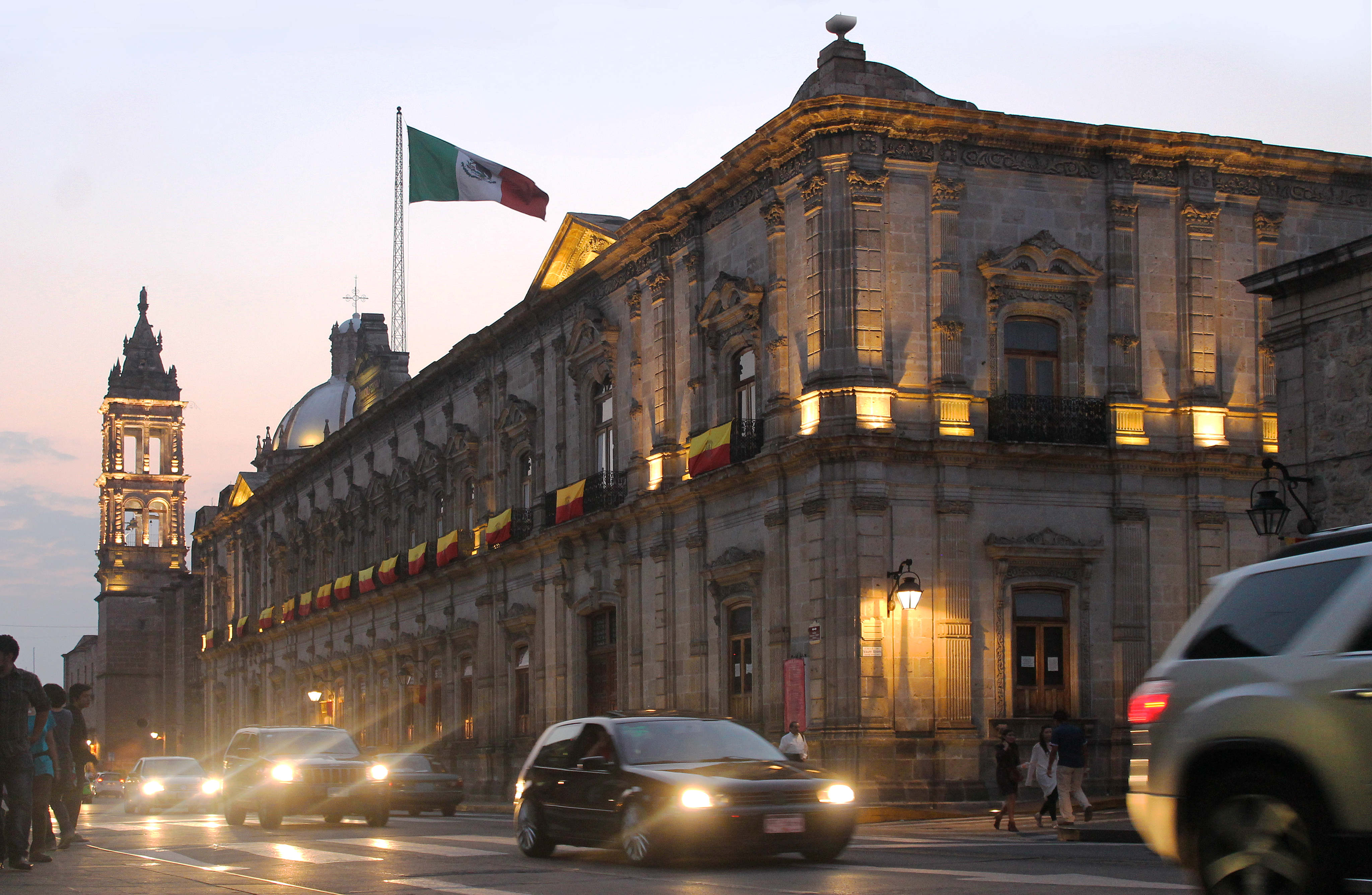
- Palacio Federal

- Flag Coat of arms

- Location of Morelia in Michoacán

- Location within Mexico
- Coordinates: 19°46′06″N 101°11′22″W
- Country: Mexico
- State: Michoacán
- Municipal seat: Morelia

Area
  - Total: 1,200 km^{2} (460 sq mi)
- Elevation: 2,250 m (7,380 ft)

Population (2020)
  - Total: 849,053
- Time zone: UTC−6

Morelia Municipality is a municipality in Michoacán, Mexico. It is the largest municipality by population in the state. Its municipal seat is the capital, Morelia.
