= Acuitzio =

Acuitzio Municipality
- Municipality
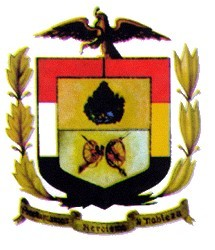
- Coat of arms

- Location of Acuitzio in Michoacán

- Location of Acuitzio in Mexico
- Coordinates: 19°30′N 101°20′W
- Country: Mexico
- State: Michoacán
- Established: 26 April 1856
- Municipal seat: Acuitzio del Canje

Area
  - Total: 180.13 km^{2} (69.55 sq mi)
- Elevation: 2,075 m (6,808 ft)

Population (2020)
  - Total: 11,301
  - Density: 62.738/km^{2} (162.49/sq mi)
- Time zone: UTC-6 (CST)
- Website: Official website

Acuitzio Municipality is a municipality located in the central region of the Mexican state of Michoacán.

== Demographics ==
The municipality had a population of 10,052 inhabitants according to the 2005 census. Its municipal seat is the city of Acuitzio del Canje.

== History ==
A religious center near Acuitzio named Coatepec was founded by the Aztecs sometime in the 12th century. It is believed that the Aztecs abandoned the center to migrate to a place their Gods had mandated. Acuitzio is a word of Purépecha origin that means "Place of the snakes".

== Geography ==
The municipality has an area of 180.13 square kilometres (0.30% of the surface of the state) and is bordered to the north and northwest by Morelia Municipality, to the east by Madero Municipality, to south by Tacámbaro Municipality, and to the southwest by Huiramba Municipality.

=== Climate ===
Climate data for Acuitzio del Canje
Month	Jan	Feb	Mar	Apr	May	Jun	Jul	Aug	Sep	Oct	Nov	Dec	Year
Mean daily maximum °C (°F)	24.0 (75.2)	24.6 (76.3)	26.8 (80.2)	29 (84)	29.5 (85.1)	27.6 (81.7)	25.8 (78.4)	26.0 (78.8)	25.7 (78.3)	25.7 (78.3)	25 (77)	23.7 (74.7)	26 (79)
Mean daily minimum °C (°F)	3.1 (37.6)	3.7 (38.7)	5.9 (42.6)	8.0 (46.4)	9.5 (49.1)	10.7 (51.3)	10.9 (51.6)	10.8 (51.4)	10.6 (51.1)	8.8 (47.8)	5.7 (42.3)	3.8 (38.8)	7.6 (45.7)
Average precipitation mm (inches)	23 (0.9)	10 (0.4)	20 (0.8)	20 (0.8)	71 (2.8)	170 (6.5)	200 (8)	240 (9.4)	240 (9.6)	76 (3)	28 (1.1)	7.6 (0.3)	1,110 (43.6)
Source: Weatherbase
