= San Lucas Municipality, Michoacán =

San Lucas Municipality
- Municipality
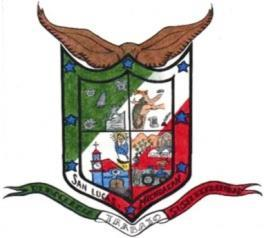
- Coat of arms

- Location of San Lucas in Michoacán
- Coordinates: 18°34′37″N 100°47′08″W
- Country: Mexico
- State: Michoacán
- Established: 1927
- Municipal seat: San Lucas

Government
  - Municipal president: Efraín Serrato Diaz

Area
  - Total: 468.01 km^{2} (180.70 sq mi)
- Elevation: 300 m (980 ft)

Population (2010)
  - Total: 18,461
  - Density: 39.446/km^{2} (102.16/sq mi)
- Time zone: UTC-6 (CST)

San Lucas is a municipality in the Mexican state of Michoacán.

== Geography ==
The municipality is located at the southeast of the state bordering the Mexican state of Guerrero. It has a territory of 468.01 km^{2} (180.70 sq mi), which represents the 9% of the state of Michoacán. San Lucas takes part of the San Lucas municipality. The government is constituted by a municipal president, one syndic, and three regidors. Other principal communities include Angao, San Pedro, Tacupa, Riva Palacio, Monte Grande and Tamarindo. San Lucas’ principal crafts are the production of palm hats, huaraches and more.

It has an average altitude of 300 meters above sea level. Its landscape is composed of the Transversal volcanic system, the Balsas depression; Silla, Cruz and Picacho hills; La bolita, Cutzamala, and the Balsas rivers; San Lucas and the Chumbitaro creeks. The climate is tropical, dry steppe, with temperatures between 20.2 and 35.3 C. The annual average rainfall is 906.5mm.

The ecosystem is dominated by tropical thorny forests with huisache, teteche, cardon, amolé, viejito and cueramo. Tropical deciduous includes parota, ceiba, and mesquite dominate the ecosystem.

== History ==
The name of San Lucas dates from the colonial era in honor to the San Lucas Virgin. The first Augustines arrived to evangelize. In 1553, Fray Juan de Moya gathered the natives and founded a new congregation. In 1765 Joseph Marcelino Palomino, a local priest integrated San Lucas to the parish of Cutzio. In 1763 an earthquake affected the church and it was about to fall in pieces. The locals tried to build another one but they could not due to their lack of money.
