= Lagunillas Municipality, Michoacán =

Coordinates: 19.5707°N 101.4194°W

Lagunillas
- Municipality
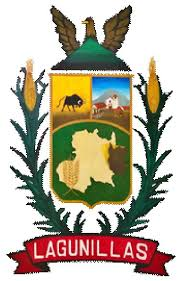
- Coat of arms
- Interactive map of Lagunillas
- Country: Mexico
- State: Michoacán
- Municipal seat: Lagunillas, Michoacán
- Time zone: UTC-6 (CST)
- Website: (in Spanish)

The municipality of Lagunillas is a municipality in the Mexican state of Michoacán. Its municipal seat is Lagunillas, Michoacán. It is bordered on the north and east by Morelia, south and west with Huiramba and Tzintzuntzan. Its distance from the state capital is 30 kilometers by the federal highway Morelia-Patzcuaro number 14. Lagunillas (small lakes) owes its name to the system of lakes and ponds that existed in ancient times in the region. During the colony a population center type hacendario. This place was called “Hacienda de Lagunillas”. By running the years the economic and social life revolved around the farm until the year of 1930 when “La Reforma Agraria” (the agrarian reform) took place.

The town owes its name to the ancient system of lakes and ponds that in ancient times there were in that region. It is located north of the State at an altitude of 2100 meters above sea level. It has an area of 83.23 km^{2} and represents 0.14 percent of the total state. Its highlight is constituted by the Sistema Volcánico Transversal (the Volcanic transversal System), intermountains and valleys, La sierra del Tigre (the Tiger Hill) and el cerro del Águila (the Eagle Mountain). Its hydrography is constituted by El río Prieto (Prieto River) and el río de Cuanajo (the Cuanajo river). The climate is mild with rain in summer. It has an annual rainfall of 784.6 millimeters and temperatures ranging from 11.2 to 38.5 °C. In the town forest predominates mixed with pine, oak and cedar.

== Political structure ==
Lagunillas (Small Lakes) is bordered on the north and east by Morelia, south and west with Huiramba and Tzintzuntzan. Its distance from the state capital is 30 kilometers by federal highway Morelia 14-Patzcuaro. Its form of government is by a municipal president who has the highest place in the town and controls all the activities in his Cabildo and he is elected by vote once every three years.

== History ==
=== Pre-Hispanic Era ===
The town date from the periods cenozoico, tertiary and quaternary higher which are related mainly to the podzólico period.

=== Colonial Period ===
During the colony it was established a population centre hacienda which was called “la Hacienda de Lagunillas” (Treasury Lagunillas). It was until the year 1930, as a result of la Reforma Agraria (the Agrarian Reform), that was granted the title of town. Years later the State Congress decreed, in August 1950, the creation of the town Lagunillas.

=== Modern times ===
Today, the people of Lagunillas has natural landscapes themselves for tourism development.

== Demographics ==
According with the INEGI census of 2000, Lagunillas has a population of 5136 inhabitants, 2448 men and 2688 women. In the census of 1990, 9 inhabitants belonged to some ethnic group in Lagunillas. Five of them were men and 4 were women. The municipality has kindergarten, primary school, secondary school and a system of education by TV. In Lagunillas there is a school of the National Institute to Adults. There is no data about the average income in Lagunillas, because the main activities are informal or not registered with the government.

== Economy ==
The main activities are:

- Agriculture which the main crops in order of importance are: corn, beans and alfalfa and represents 40% of economic activity
- Livestock which breeding pigs, poultry, cattle, goats, horses, mules and hinnies and represents 40% of economic activity
- Industry which the municipality has manufacturing industries and food manufacturing brick and tile and Represents 10% of economic activity.
- Logging which the timber forest area is occupied by pine and oak. Represents 10% of economic activity.
- Tourism in which it has natural landscapes themselves for the development of tourism.
- Trade, consisting of small shops which sell products first and second necessity.

Services which the account service lodging, food and transportation to meet foreign demand.

== Notable sites/buildings ==
The most common places to visit in Lagunillas are the following:

Sports units, football pitches and basketball courts, parks and gardens, public buildings, sports and recreational units, monuments and fountains, among others. In addition you can find handicrafts, pottery and cuisine.
