= Turicato =

- Town and municipality
- Turicato
- Location of Turicato in Mexico
- Coordinates: 19°03′00″N 101°25′00″W
- Country: Mexico
- State: Michoacán
- Municipality: Turicato

Government
  - Mayor: Salvador Barrera Medrano (PRD-PT)

Area
  - Total: 1,543.27 km^{2} (595.86 sq mi)
  - Water: 8,175 ha (20,200 acres)
- Elevation: 720 m (2,360 ft)

Population (2010)
  - Total: 31,877
  - Density: 20.655/km^{2} (53.497/sq mi)
- Time zone: UTC-6 (CST)
- Postal code: 61680 -
- Area code: 459

Turicato is a municipality in the Mexican state of Michoacán. Turicato comes from the word "turicata" that refers to a parasite that lives mainly in areas where there is cattle.

The municipality represents 2.62% of total land in the state. It is in the region known as "Tierra Caliente", or hot land, because during the dry season the region gets really hot. Most notably in the month of May you can see temperatures rise to more than 110 degrees Fahrenheit. During the rainy season in the summer, the land converts to a very lush green forest region with streams running throughout the municipality.

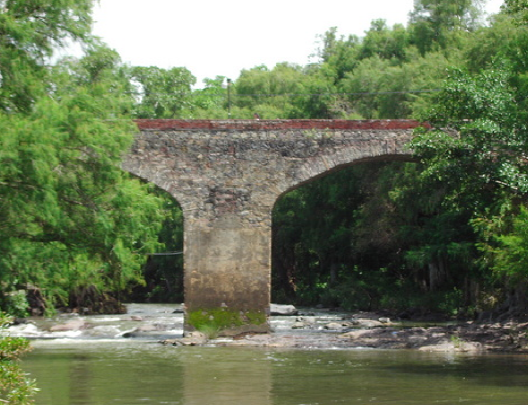
Bridge in Turicato

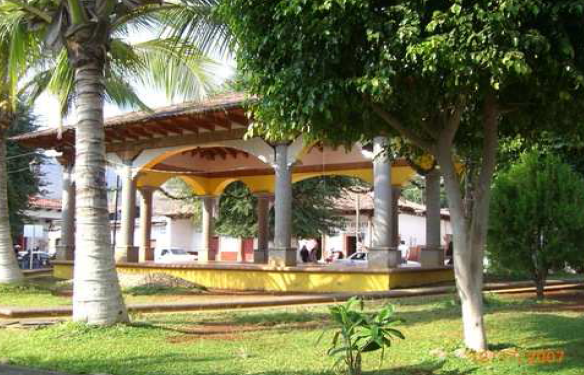
Plaza of Turicato

It is a rural municipality in an area with rolling hills. The municipal seat is named Turicato as well. The town of Turicato is small, and has no more than 10,000 inhabitants. The rest of the inhabitants are from small scattered villages, tucked in the hills of the county. With dirt roads to reach most villages south of the capital, the people live a traditional life style. The majority, if not all of the county, is governed by the law of the land.

The municipality of Turicato is the heart of a drug turf war, with military presence to combat the drug cartel that dominates the region. It is plagued by instability and is one of the most dangerous municipalities to live in or visit, because of the heavily armed drug gangs and the family rivalries that are armed as well. They are normally armed with guns like the AK-47 and AR-15.

The best-known communities of Turicato are: Puruarán, Zárate, Cutzián Grande, El Ciruelo and Santa Cruz. Several music groups have risen out of those villages. La Trafa Norteña and Los Norteñitos are the most popular groups that play in a wide variety of ceremonies, dances, and events.

The capital of Turicato is widely known throughout the county for its food. The most famous of these foods are the carnitas. People travel from all around the country to eat them. Another very traditional dish in the region is mole. This dish dates back to pre-colonial period and is a dish of the indigenous people.

Tapadas are a five-day celebration of bull-riding, cockfighting, and dances from prominent groups of Mexican musicians play all night long. This event is very famous as from nearby municipalities people travel hours to enjoy the celebration. The first occurs in mid-January in the village of San Cristobal De Los Guajes...A.K.A. Los Guajes. The other one occurs in mid to late November in Santa Cruz De Morelos.

The capital of Turicato is widely known throughout the county for its food. The most famous of these foods are the carnitas. People travel from all around the country to try these carnitas, which are unmatched by any other food. Another very traditional dish in the region is mole. This dish dates back to pre-colonial period and is a dish of the indigenous people.

To reach Turicato from the capital of Morelia go to the Central Camionera and take a bus to Tacambaro (no more than $20.00 U.S dollars). From there you can either take a taxi to Turicato (for about less than $8.00 U.S dollars.) the capital of the county. To go into the heart of the county you can take "La Flecha" there are two different routes at different times. One of the routes goes to Santa Cruz via-Cutzian Grande, the other one goes to Las Nueces via Zarate.

As of August 2008 the region has been vary stable, violence has disappeared due to the presence of the military intervening. Spring is the best time to visit when the region is lush and green.
