= Tacámbaro =

- City and municipality
- Tacámbaro de Codallos
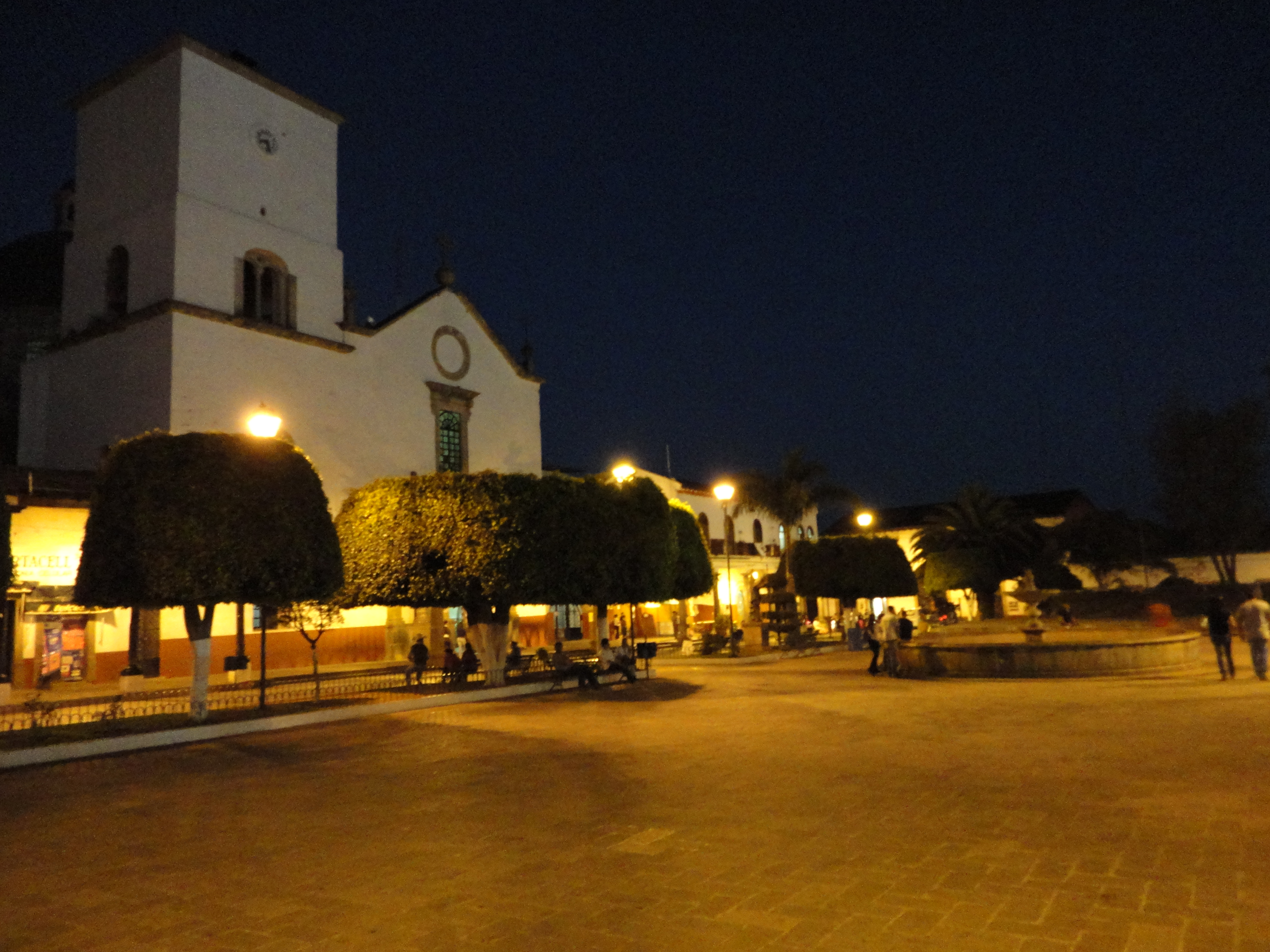
- Center of Tacámbaro at night

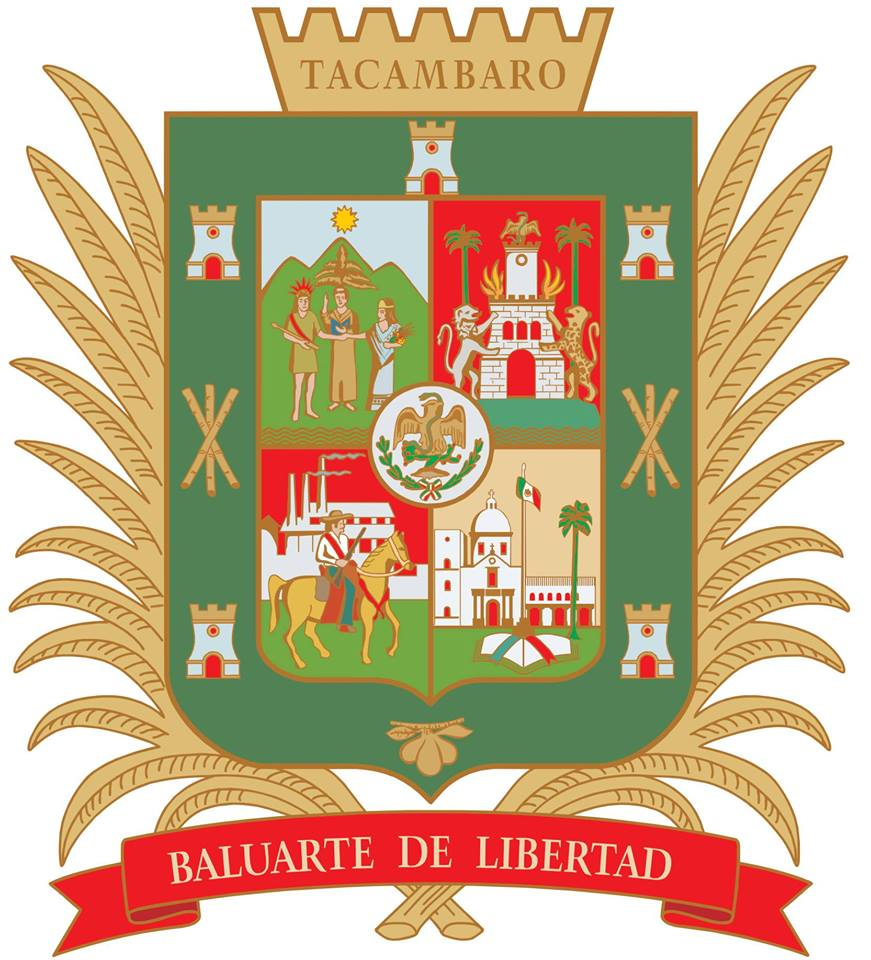
- Coat of arms

- Tacámbaro municipality in Michoacán

- Location of Tacámbaro in Mexico
- Coordinates: 19°14′08″N 101°27′25″W
- Country: Mexico
- State: Michoacán
- Founded: 1831
- Elevation: 1,654 m (5,427 ft)

Population (2020)
  - Total: 81,105
  - Seat: 30,519
- Time zone: UTC-6 (CST)
- Postal code: 61650
- Area code: 459

Tacámbaro (Spanish pronunciation: [ta'kambaro]) is a municipality in the western part of the Mexican state of Michoacán. Its largest city and municipal seat is Heroica Tacámbaro de Codallos.

The city is located at 19°14′00″N 102°12′00″W. In the 2020 census, the municipality's population was 81,105, positioning it as the 12th largest municipality in the state. The municipality has an area of 788.69 km^{2} (304.51 sq mi).

== History ==
=== Prior to Mexican independence ===
Tacámbaro's origins go back to pre-Hispanic times. The purépechas conquered the city in the first half of the 14th century. In 1528, it was awarded as an encomienda to Cristóbal de Oñate, and the town was formally established in 1535. Five years later, a chapel and convent were founded in the town.

In 1631, a partido de indios was established with Tacámbaro as the capital. Epidemics of disease, particularly that of 1575, had stripped the town of much of its population. By 1631, it had eight communities and a small population.

In 1706, Fray Francisco de Fonseca was designated as the town prior. He introduced a street grid, water sources and a reconstructed convent.

=== Mexican independence and beyond ===
After the war of independence, Tacámbaro's haciendas and ranchos were burned down and the town was left in ruins. Reconstruction, however, promptly led Tacámbaro to grow and receive new statuses. In 1828, it was declared a villa by Governor José Salgado; three years later, the municipality was formed as a consequence of a new territorial law. In 1859, Governor Gen. Epitacio Huerta declared Tacámbaro a city and gave it the name Ciudad de Codallos, in honor of General Juan José Codallos, who participated in the war of independence. The local residents petitioned for the name to be changed to Tacámbaro de Codallos, which was accepted.

In 1865, a battle was fought at Tacámbaro during the French Intervention in Mexico.

In late 1919, during the Mexican Revolution, Tacámbaro briefly served as the state capital.

Pueblo Mágico of Tacámbaro

In November 2012, Tacámbaro was designated a Pueblo Mágico. It is the sixth municipality in the state to receive this distinction.

== Demographics ==
The municipality of Tacámbaro has 69,955 inhabitants, of which 34,010 are men and 35,945 are women.

The municipality has some 200 individual communities, of which the largest is Heroica Tacámbaro de Codallos with a population of 25,665. Six other communities have more than 1,000 inhabitants.
