= Huetamo =

Municipality in Michoacán, Mexico

Coordinates: 18°35′N 100°53′W

- Municipality

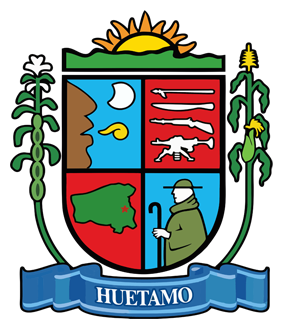
- Coat of arms

- Location in Mexico Huetamo (Mexico)
- Country: Mexico
- State: Michoacán

Population (2020)
  - Municipality: 41,973
  - Seat: 23,836
- Demonym: (in Spanish)
- Time zone: UTC−6 (CST)

Huetamo is a municipality in the southeastern corner of the Mexican state of Michoacán, in a region known as "Tierra Caliente" (meaning hot land). Of indigenous Purepecha Indian origin, the word "Huetamo" means "four chiefs" or "four came". The municipal seat is the city of San Juan Huetamo de Núñez. In 2015, the population of Huetamo was 41,973.

== History ==
The region was independent around the 16th century. During this period of time, Andalusians, African slaves and indigenous people populated the region. Through time the people in the region became people of mixed race; castas, mainly Castizos, Mestizos, Mulatos and Lobos – another name for Zambos.

The French invaded Mexico in 1862, taking control of many large and wealthy haciendas in the Tierra Caliente region, such as Zirandaro, and Comburindio. However they were defeated by the Andalusian-styled "Terracalentanos". About 400 French soldiers were imprisoned in Zirandaro, but many later escaped or were released by the people. Most of the French soldiers that were freed married women in the same region. Zirandaro is known to have the greatest French heritage in the region.

In 2014, the central Mexican government began a plan to construction in irrigation dam in Chigüero, a few miles north of Huetamo. As a result, archeologists began a salvage project in 2015 and 2016 in order to preserve the area affected by the dam's construction, as well as the surrounding irrigation zone. The Middle Balsas region had not been extensively studied prior to this and as a result, the pre-Hispanic history of Huetamo was largely unknown. Based on radiocarbon dating of excavated materials from 10 of the sites around the dam construction project, Englehardt et al. (2020) has proposed four distinct phases of the region.

On December 7, 2021, Huetamo was hit by a 4.0 earthquake.

== Notable people ==
Leo Santa Cruz - Professional Boxer

Amalia Mendoza - Mexican singer and actress

== See also ==
- Municipalities of Michoacán
