= 7th federal electoral district of Michoacán =

Federal electoral district of Mexico

Michoacán's 7th
- Electoral district of the Chamber of Deputies of Mexico

- 7th district since 2023

Incumbent
- Member: Marcela Velázquez Vázquez
- Party: ▌Morena
- Congress: 66th (2024–2027)

District
- State: Michoacán
- Head town: Zacapu
- Coordinates: 19°49′N 101°48′W
- Covers: 17 municipalities: Angamacutiro, Coeneo, Charapan, Cherán, Chilchota, Chucándiro, Huaniqueo, Jiménez, José Sixto Verduzco, Morelos, Nahuatzen, Panindícuaro, Paracho, Puruándiro, Quiroga, Tangancícuaro, Zacapu
- PR region: Fifth
- Precincts: 319
- Population: 466,382 (2020 census)
- Indigenous: Yes (42%)

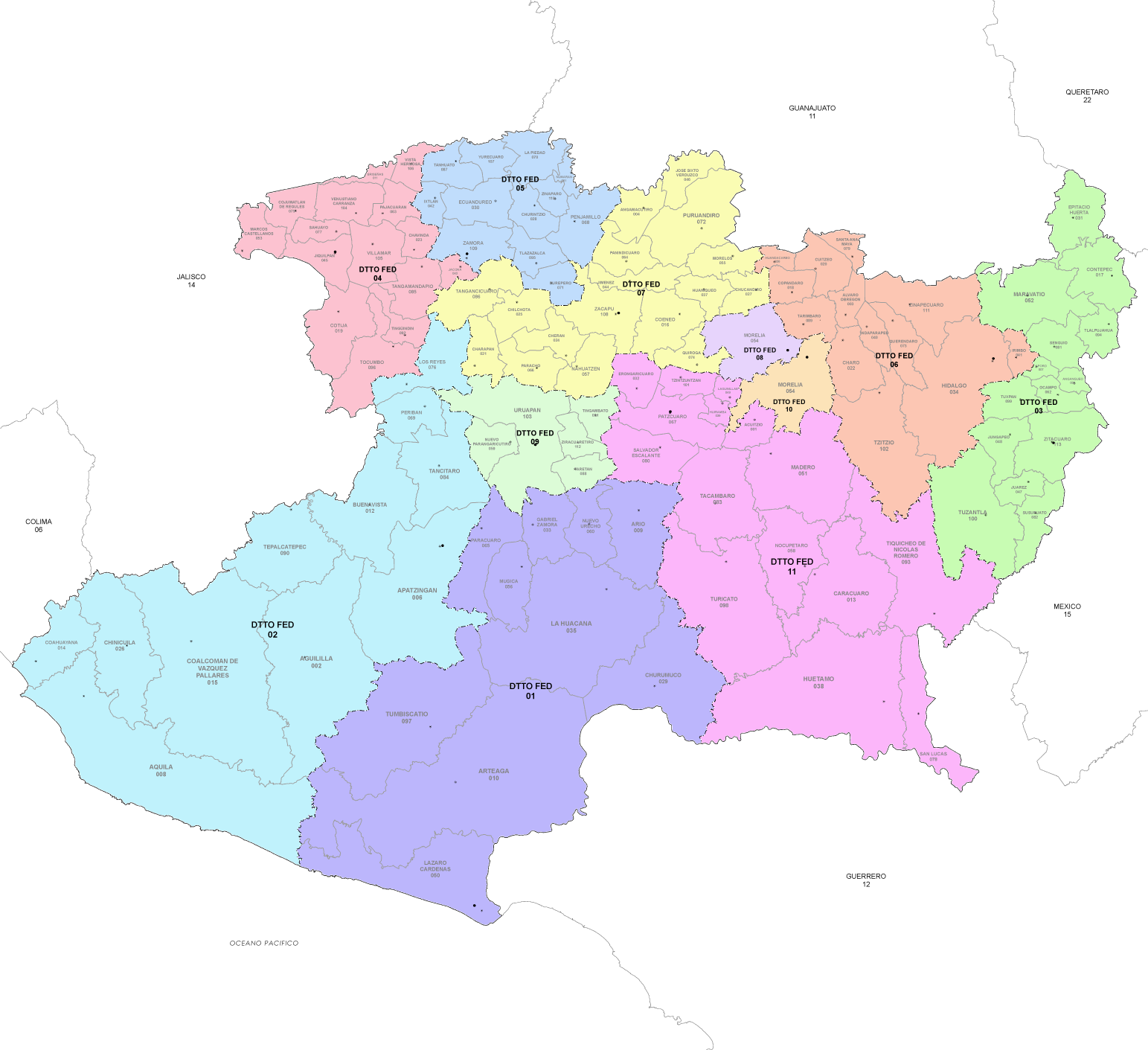
Michoacán's federal electoral districts since 2023

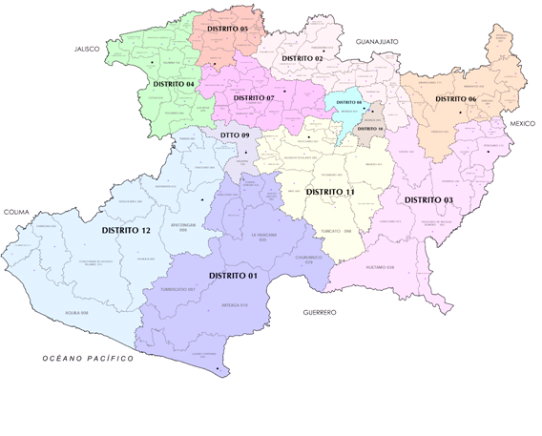
Michoacán under the 2017–2022 districting scheme

The 7th federal electoral district of Michoacán (Spanish: Distrito electoral federal 07 de Michoacán) is one of the 300 electoral districts into which Mexico is divided for elections to the federal Chamber of Deputies and one of 11 such districts in the state of Michoacán.

It elects one deputy to the lower house of Congress for each three-year legislative session by means of the first-past-the-post system. Votes cast in the district also count towards the calculation of proportional representation ("plurinominal") deputies elected from the fifth region.

The current member for the district, elected in the 2024 general election, is Marcela Velázquez Vázquez of the National Regeneration Movement (Morena).

== District territory ==
Michoacán lost its 12th district in the 2023 districting process carried out by the National Electoral Institute (INE). Under the new districting plan, which is to be used for the 2024, 2027 and 2030 federal elections, the 7th district covers 319 precincts (secciones electorales) across 17 municipalities in the north of the state:

- Angamacutiro, Coeneo, Charapan, Cherán, Chilchota, Chucándiro, Huaniqueo, Jiménez, José Sixto Verduzco, Morelos, Nahuatzen, Panindícuaro, Paracho, Puruándiro, Quiroga, Tangancícuaro and Zacapu.

The head town (cabecera distrital), where results from individual polling stations are gathered together and tallied, is the city of Zacapu. The district reported a population of 466,382 in the 2020 census; with Indigenous and Afrodescendent inhabitants accounting for over 42% of that total, Michoacán's 7th is classified by the National Electoral Institute as an indigenous district: the only one in the state. (Note: The INE deems any local or federal electoral district where Indigenous or Afrodescendent inhabitants number 40% or more of the total population to be an indigenous district.)

== Previous districting schemes ==
Evolution of electoral district numbers
	1974	1978	1996	2005	2017	2023
Michoacán	9	13	13	12	12	11
Chamber of Deputies	196	300				

2017–2022

Between 2017 and 2022, the district's head town was at Zacapu and it comprised 13 municipalities:
- Coeneo, Charapan, Cherán, Chilchota, Erongarícuaro, Jacona, Nahuatzen, Paracho, Purépero, Quiroga, Tangancícuaro, Tlazazalca and Zacapu.

2005–2017

Under the 2005 districting plan, Michoacán lost its 13th district. The 7th district's head town was at Zacapu and it covered 12 municipalities in that region of the state:
- Coeneo, Charapan, Cherán, Chilchota, Erongarícuaro, Los Reyes, Nahuatzen, Paracho, Purépero, Quiroga, Tangancícuaro and Zacapu.

1996–2005

Under the 1996 districting plan, the district's head town was at Zacapu and it covered 12 municipalities:
- Cherán, Coeneo, Erongarícuaro, Huaniqueo, Huiramba, Jiménez, Lagunillas, Nahuatzen, Pátzcuaro, Quiroga, Tzintzuntzan and Zacapu.

1978–1996

The districting scheme in force from 1978 to 1996 was the result of the 1977 electoral reforms, which increased the number of single-member seats in the Chamber of Deputies from 196 to 300. Under the reforms, Michoacán's allocation rose from 9 to 13. The 7th district's head town was at Tacámbaro in the central region of the state and it was composed of 11 municipalities:
- Ario, Carácuaro, Churumuco, Huetamo, Madero, Nocupétaro, San Lucas, Tacámbaro, Tiquicheo, Tumbiscatío and Turicato.

== Deputies returned to Congress ==
(Mexico) National parties
- Current
- PAN
- PRI
- PT
- PVEM
- MC
- Morena
- PAZ
- Somos
- Defunct or local only
- PLM
- PNR
- PRM
- PNM
- PP
- PPS
- PARM
- PFCRN
- CON
- PANAL
- PSD
- PES
- PES
- PRD

Michoacán 7th district
Election	Deputy	Party	Term	Legislature
1916	Salvador Alcaraz Romero		1916–1917	Constituent Congress of Querétaro
...
1979	Raúl Pineda Pineda	Institutional Revolutionary Party	1979–1982	51st Congress
1982	Cristóbal Arias Solís	Institutional Revolutionary Party	1982–1985	52nd Congress
1985	José Ascensión Bustos Velasco	Institutional Revolutionary Party	1985–1988	53rd Congress
1988	Huber González Jarillo	Authentic Party of the Mexican Revolution	1988–1991	54th Congress
1991	Hernán Virgilio Pineda Arellano	Institutional Revolutionary Party	1991–1994	55th Congress
1994	Emilio Solórzano Solís	Institutional Revolutionary Party	1994–1997	56th Congress
1997	Gonzalo Augusto de la Cruz	Party of the Democratic Revolution	1997–2000	57th Congress
2000	Rafael Servín Maldonado	Party of the Democratic Revolution	2000–2003	58th Congress
2003	Abdallán Guzmán Cruz	Party of the Democratic Revolution	2003–2006	59th Congress
2006	Humberto Alonso Razo	Party of the Democratic Revolution	2006–2009	60th Congress
2009	Martín García Avilés	Party of the Democratic Revolution	2009–2012	61st Congress
2012	José Luis Esquivel Zalpa	Party of the Democratic Revolution	2012–2015	62nd Congress
2015	José Guadalupe Hernández Alcalá	Labour Party (Mexico)	2015–2018	63rd Congress
2018	Gonzalo Herrera Pérez	National Regeneration Movement	2018–2021	64th Congress
2021	Adriana Campos Huirache	Institutional Revolutionary Party	2021–2024	65th Congress
2024	Marcela Velázquez Vázquez	National Regeneration Movement	2024–2027	66th Congress

== Presidential elections ==
Michoacán's 7th district
Election	District won by	Party or coalition	%
2018	Andrés Manuel López Obrador	Juntos Haremos Historia	49.1710
2024	Claudia Sheinbaum Pardo	Sigamos Haciendo Historia	60.0876
