= Coeneo Municipality =

Coeneo Municipality Municipio de Coeneo
- Municipality
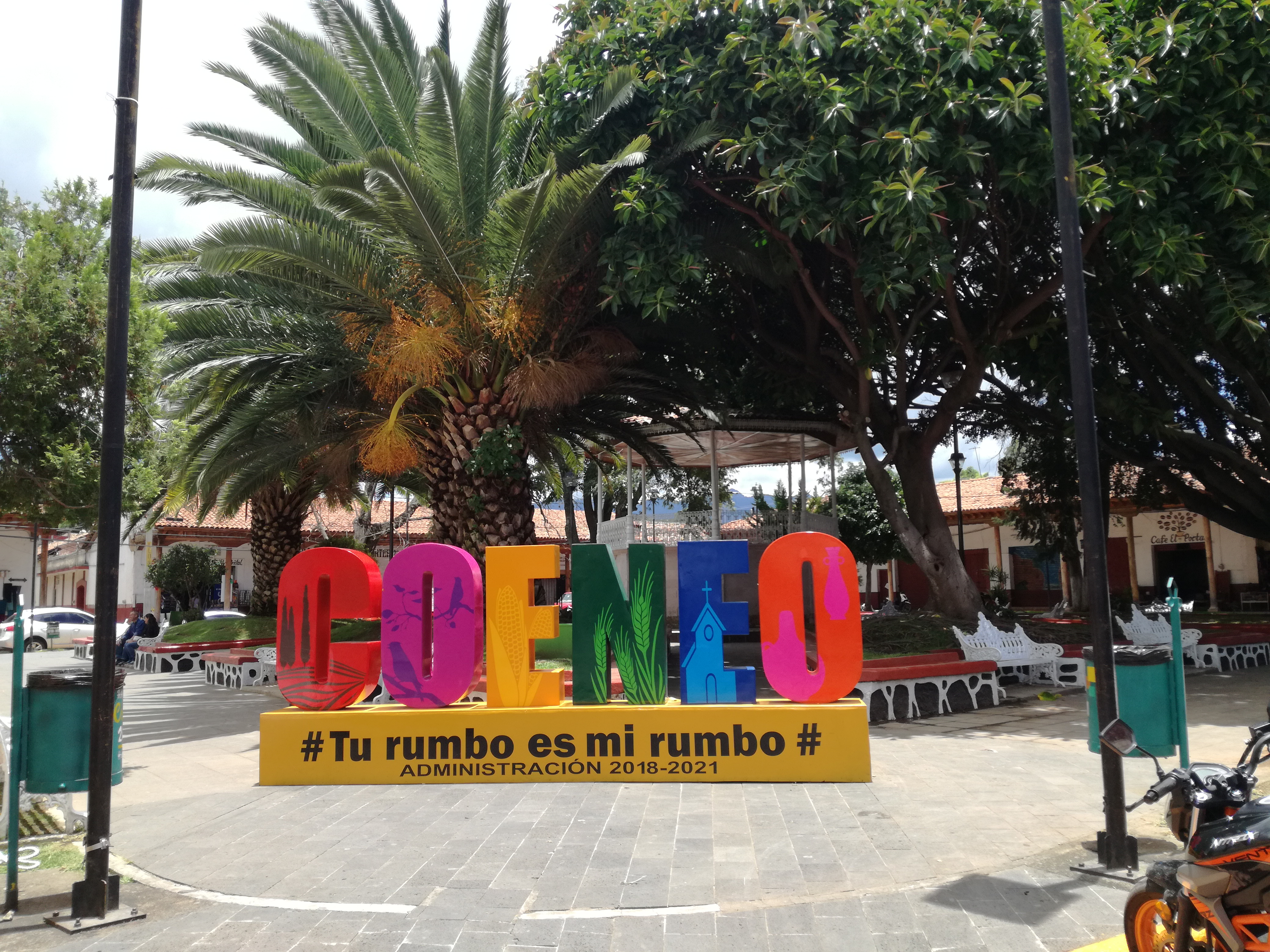
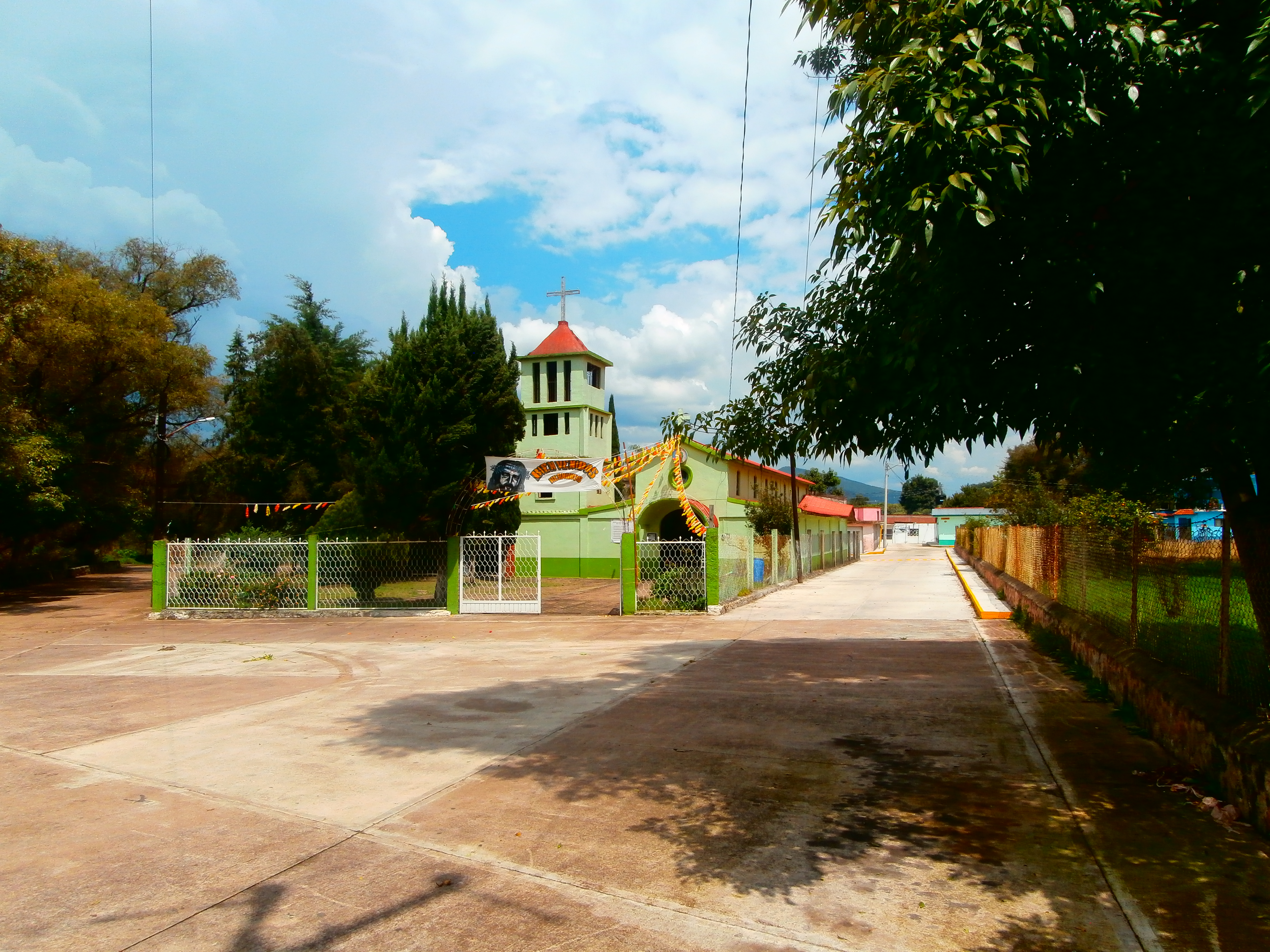
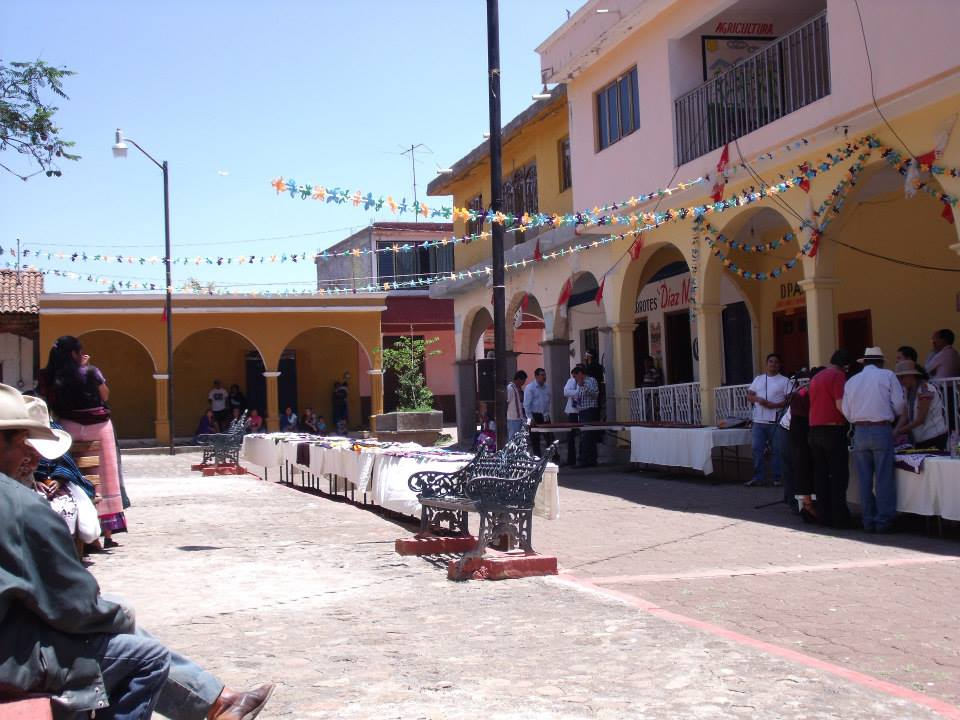
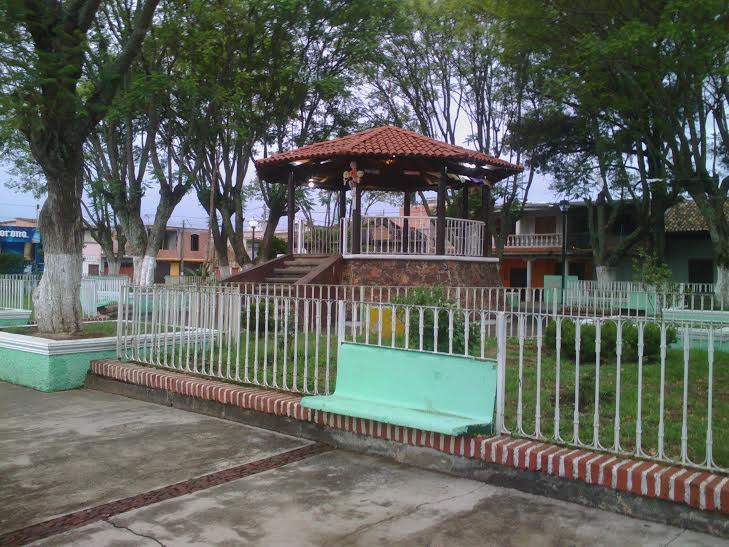
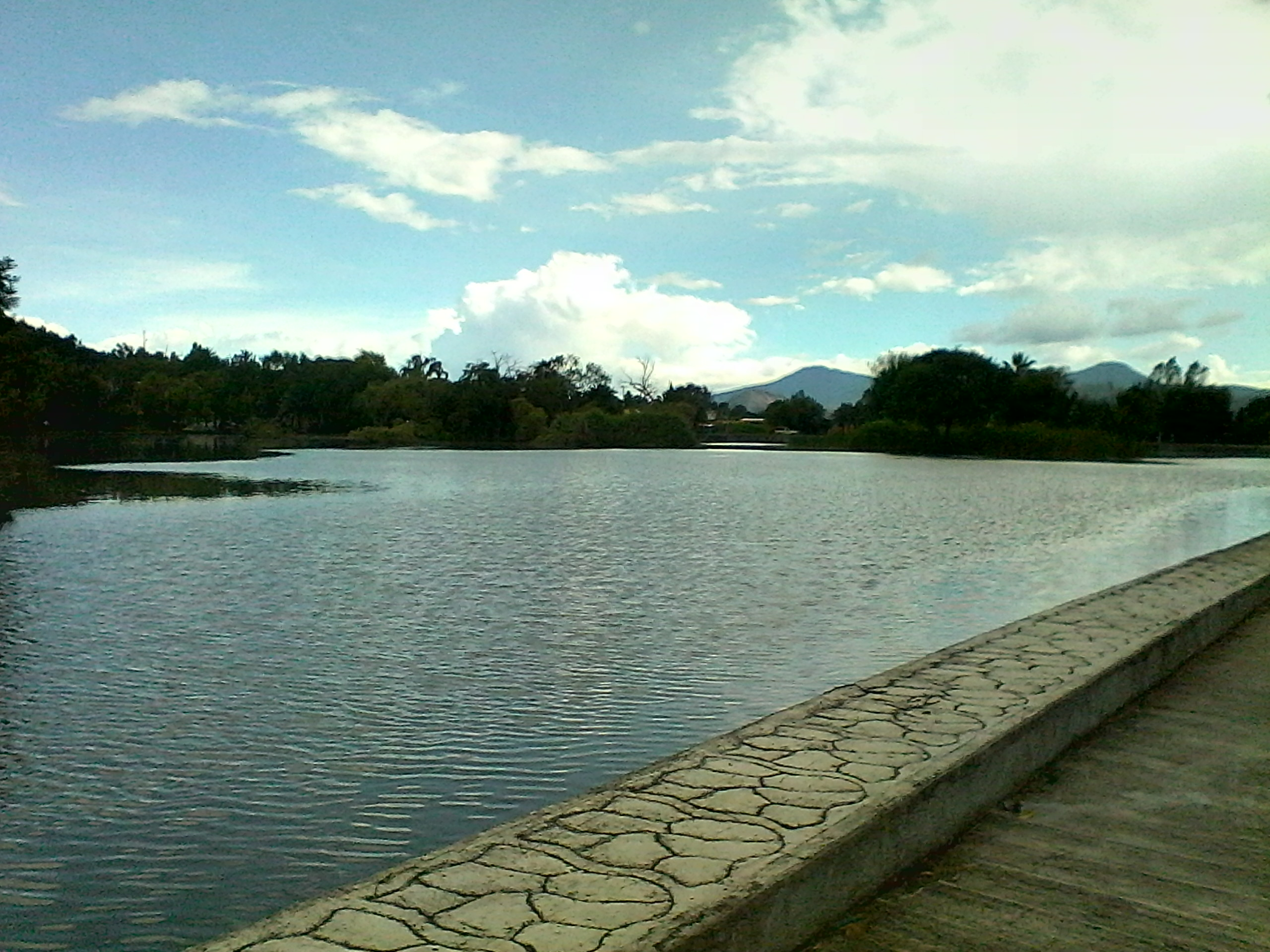
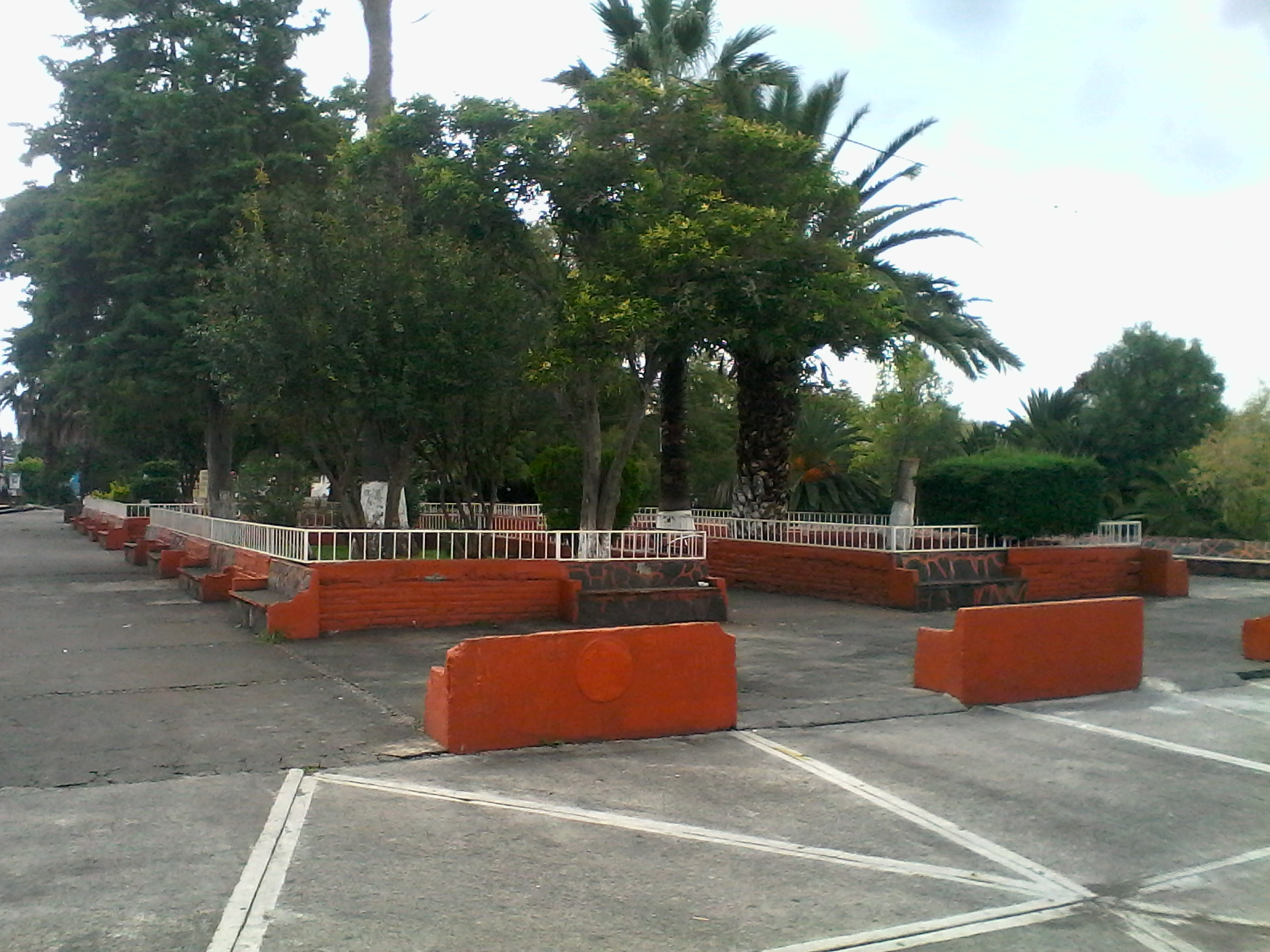

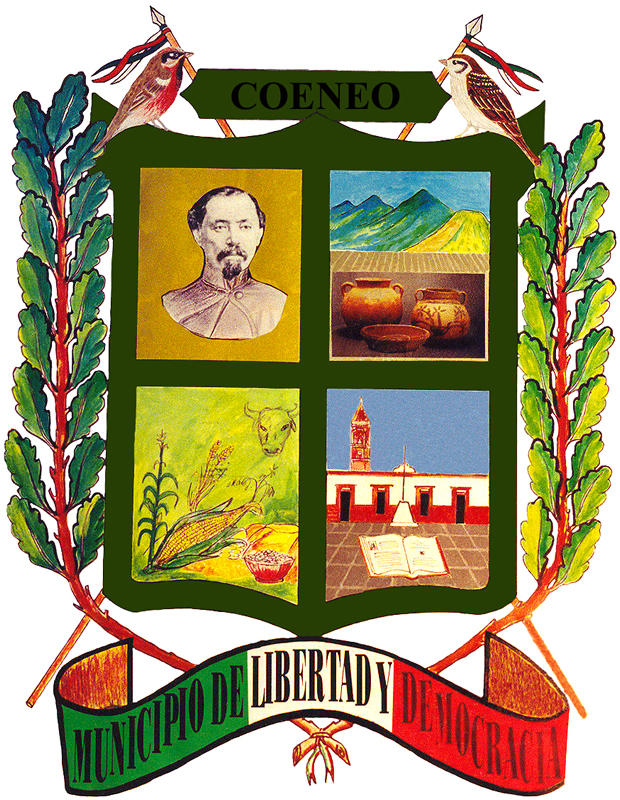
- Coat of arms

- Coordinates: 19°48′00″N 101°36′30″W
- Country: Mexico
- State: Michoacán
- Municipal seat: Coeneo de la Libertad

Government
  - Municipal President: Valeria Aguilar Juárez (MORENA)

Area
  - Total: 394 km^{2} (152 sq mi)
  - Water: 0.25–2.1 km^{2} (0.097–0.811 sq mi)
- Elevation (Average): 2,040 m (6,690 ft)
- Highest elevation (A section of "Cerro EL Tzirate" (Shared with Quiroga Municipality)): 2,725 m (8,940 ft)
- Lowest elevation: 1,978 m (6,490 ft)

Population
  - Total: 20,965
  - Density: 53.2/km^{2} (138/sq mi)

Coeneo Municipality is one of the 113 municipalities into which the Mexican state of Michoacán de Ocampo is divided; it is located in the north-central part of the state, and its municipal seat is the town of Coeneo de la Libertad. It was established as a municipality on December 10, 1831.

== Geography ==
Coeneo is located in the north-central region of Michoacán, within the area known as the Purépecha Plateau; it covers an area of approximately 394 km², representing 0.66% of the total surface area of the state of Michoacán. It is bordered to the north by the municipalities of Jiménez and Huaniqueo; to the east by the municipalities of Huaniqueo, Morelia, and Quiroga; to the south by the municipality of Quiroga; to the southwest by the municipality of Erongarícuaro; and to the west by the municipality of Zacapu.

=== Topography and hydrography ===
The territory of Coeneo is mountainous, forming part of the Trans-Mexican Volcanic Belt; its highest elevation is a section of Tzirate Peak (the peak's summit lies within the municipality of Quiroga, at 3,340 meters above sea level) in the Sierra de Comanja range. Key watercourses include the La Patera River and several smaller streams—such as the Tzirate Arroyo—as well as bodies of water like Lake Bellas Fuentes and the Tunguitiro Dam. The entire territory falls within the Lerma-Santiago Hydrological Region and is divided into two distinct basins: the easternmost third belongs to the Lake Pátzcuaro-Cuitzeo and Yuriria Lagoon Basin, while the remainder belongs to the Lerma-Chapala River Basin.

=== Climate and ecosystems ===
The entire territory of the Coeneo municipality experiences a "temperate sub-humid climate with summer rains," particularly in the area known as El Tzirate, a mountain range bordering the town of Tunguitiro. The average annual temperature ranges from 16 to 24°C across most of the municipality—with the sole exception of the southeast, where the average is 12 to 16°C—while average annual precipitation is 800 to 1,000 mm, differing in the southern zone, where it ranges from 1,000 to 1,200 mm.

The municipality's lowland flora consists primarily of scrubland; however, the vast majority of the territory is dedicated to agriculture, with the exception of the higher elevations in the southeast, which are covered by pine and oak forests. Key animal species include the hare, rabbit, squirrel, deer, coyote, fox, and opossum.

== Demography ==
In 2020, the total population of the municipality of Coeneo was 20,965 inhabitants, representing an average annual growth rate of 0.23% between 2010 and 2020, based on the 20,492 inhabitants recorded in the previous census. As of 2020, the municipality's population density was 53.25 inhabitants/km².

INEGI code	Township	Population (2020)
160160001	Coeneo de la Libertad	3776
160160034	Zipiajo	2817
160160011	Comanja	1661
160160003	Santiago Azajo	1614
160160004	Bellas Fuentes	1104
160160006	La Cañada	923
160160029	San Isidro	920
160160014	Cortijo Viejo	687
160160033	Tunguitiro (Tingüitiro)	568
160160024	Pretoria	514
160160021	Matugeo	497
160160013	Cortijo Nuevo	489
160160002	Aguacaliente	436
160160020	Laredo	419
160160027	Quencio	417
160160030	San Pedro Tacaro	416
160160018	Colonia Emiliano Zapata	412
160160016	Chahueto	383
160160012	La Constitución	329
160160025	Colonia Primo Tapia (El Chirimoyo)	301
160160015	Cótiro	299
160160010	La Cofradía (El Capulín)	257
160160028	El Rodeo	253
160160009	El Cobrero	237
160160019	Colonia Félix Ireta	203
160160032	El Transval	179
160160026	El Puente del Mirador	161
160160022	Las Mesas	134
160160005	Colonia Benito Juárez (Los Charcos)	110
160160007	Carátacua	95
160160017	El Durazno	77
160160008	La Cieneguita	72
160160031	Tacupo	69
160160023	Ojo de Agüita	53
160160040	Agua Blanca	22
160160036	La Higuera	19
160160049	El Capulín	15
160160037	Los Jacales	11
160160048	Buenavista	6
160160047	La Palma	4
160160042	Matorio	3
Total population of the municipality		20 965
