= Martín García Avilés =

Mexican politician

- Born: 7 April 1974 (age 52); Nahuatzen, Michoacán, Mexico
- Education: UMSNH
- Occupation: Politician
- Political party: PRD

Martín García Avilés (born 7 April 1974) is a Mexican politician from the Party of the Democratic Revolution PRD). In the 2009 mid-terms he was elected to the Chamber of Deputies to represent Michoacán's seventh district during the 61st session of Congress.
