= Jiménez, Michoacán =

Jiménez
- Municipality
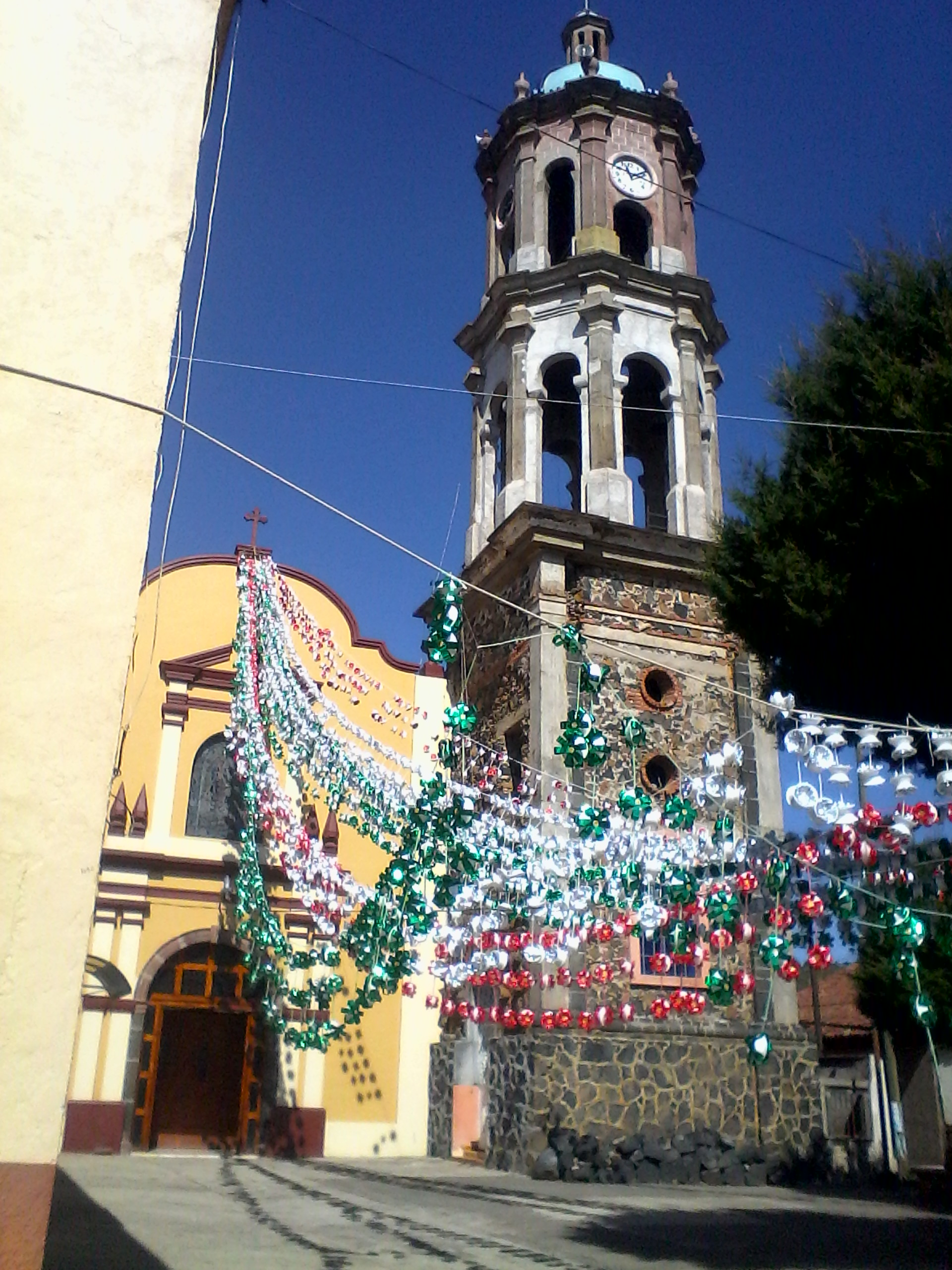
- Temple in Caurio de Guadalupe, Jiménez

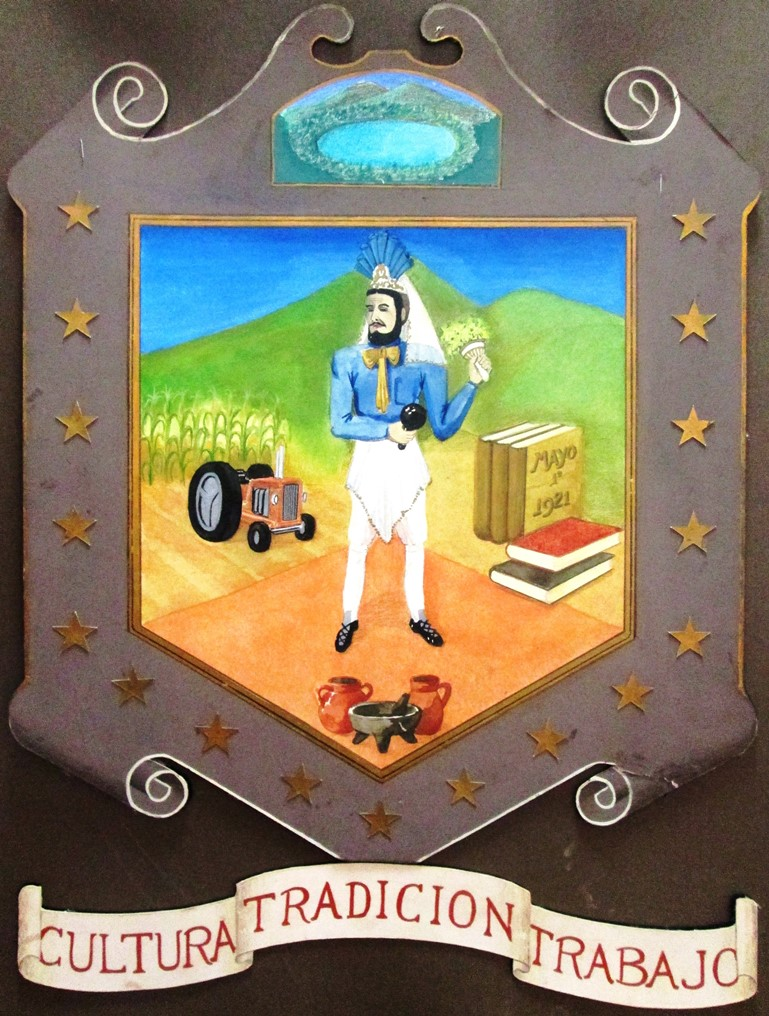
- Coat of arms

- Location in Michoacán and Mexico Jiménez (Mexico)
- Coordinates: 19°55′23″N 101°44′49″W
- Country: Mexico
- State: Michoacán
- Established: 1 May 1921
- Seat: Villa Jiménez

Government
  - President: Arturo León Balvanera

Area
  - Total: 195.097 km^{2} (75.327 sq mi)
- Elevation (of seat): 2,018 m (6,621 ft)

Population (2010 Census)
  - Total: 13,275
  - Estimate (2015 Intercensal Survey): 12,426
  - Density: 68.043/km^{2} (176.23/sq mi)
  - Seat: 4,249
- Time zone: UTC-6 (Central)
- Postal codes: 58780–58796
- Area code: 454
- Website: Official website

Jiménez is a municipality in the Mexican state of Michoacán. It is located approximately 65 kilometres (40 mi) west of the state capital of Morelia.

== Geography ==
The municipality of Jiménez is located in the Trans-Mexican Volcanic Belt in northern Michoacán at an elevation between 1,900 and 2,500 metres (6,200–8,200 ft). It borders the municipalities of Puruándiro to the north, Morelos to the northeast, Huaniqueo to the east, Coeneo to the southeast, Zacapu to the southwest, and Panindícuaro to the northwest. The municipality covers an area of 195.057 square kilometres (75.312 sq mi) and comprises 0.33% of the state's area.

As of 2009, the land cover in Jiménez consists of grassland (16%), temperate forest (10%), matorral (5%) and tropical forest (4%). Another 56% of the land is used for agriculture and 2% consists of urban areas. Jiménez is drained by the Ángulo River, a tributary of the Lerma River which flows south to north through the municipality. There are a few small reservoirs in the municipality, the largest of which are the Aristeo Mercado Reservoir with a capacity of 27,000,000 cubic metres (950,000,000 cu ft), and the Copándaro Reservoir with a capacity of 4,000,000 cubic metres (140,000,000 cu ft).

=== Climate ===
Jiménez has a temperate climate with rain in the summer. Average temperatures in the municipality range between 16 and 18 °C (61–64 °F), and average annual precipitation ranges between 800 and 1,000 millimetres (31–39 in).

Climate data for Villa Jiménez weather station at 19°55′23″N 101°44′49″W, 2000 m above sea level (1981–2010 averages, 1951–2010 extremes)
Month	Jan	Feb	Mar	Apr	May	Jun	Jul	Aug	Sep	Oct	Nov	Dec	Year
Record high °C (°F)	31.5 (88.7)	33.0 (91.4)	35.0 (95.0)	39.0 (102.2)	37.0 (98.6)	37.0 (98.6)	31.0 (87.8)	30.0 (86.0)	35.0 (95.0)	32.0 (89.6)	31.8 (89.2)	32.0 (89.6)	39.0 (102.2)
Mean daily maximum °C (°F)	23.4 (74.1)	25.4 (77.7)	27.5 (81.5)	29.5 (85.1)	30.2 (86.4)	28.2 (82.8)	25.5 (77.9)	25.3 (77.5)	25.1 (77.2)	24.8 (76.6)	24.6 (76.3)	23.7 (74.7)	26.1 (79.0)
Daily mean °C (°F)	12.8 (55.0)	14.5 (58.1)	16.4 (61.5)	18.6 (65.5)	20.4 (68.7)	20.5 (68.9)	18.9 (66.0)	18.6 (65.5)	18.4 (65.1)	16.7 (62.1)	14.8 (58.6)	13.3 (55.9)	17.0 (62.6)
Mean daily minimum °C (°F)	2.3 (36.1)	3.5 (38.3)	5.2 (41.4)	7.7 (45.9)	10.5 (50.9)	12.7 (54.9)	12.3 (54.1)	12.0 (53.6)	11.8 (53.2)	8.6 (47.5)	4.9 (40.8)	2.8 (37.0)	7.9 (46.2)
Record low °C (°F)	−8.0 (17.6)	−6.0 (21.2)	−2.5 (27.5)	0.5 (32.9)	1.5 (34.7)	7.5 (45.5)	0.0 (32.0)	6.0 (42.8)	4.0 (39.2)	−3.0 (26.6)	−5.0 (23.0)	−6.0 (21.2)	−8.0 (17.6)
Average precipitation mm (inches)	14.7 (0.58)	12.7 (0.50)	6.4 (0.25)	8.4 (0.33)	40.0 (1.57)	136.3 (5.37)	220.7 (8.69)	205.1 (8.07)	168.8 (6.65)	59.3 (2.33)	13.6 (0.54)	9.7 (0.38)	895.7 (35.26)
Average rainy days (≥ 1 mm)	2.2	1.9	1.5	2.2	6.8	15.6	22.6	20.6	16.2	7.6	2.5	1.5	101.2
Source: Servicio Meteorológico Nacional

== History ==
In the mid-19th century, stagecoaches running between Zamora and Morelia forded the Ángulo River at what is now Villa de Jiménez. A man named Patrocinio Aguilar lived there and supplied travellers with provisions, so that the place became known as Vado de Aguilar ("Aguilar's Ford"). On May 30, 1910, the settlement was granted the status of a town (villa) and renamed after Mariano Jiménez, governor of Michoacán from 1885 to 1892.

Originally part of the municipality of Zacapu, Jiménez became an independent municipality on 1 May 1921.

== Administration ==
The municipal government comprises a president, a councillor (Spanish: síndico), and seven trustees (regidores), four elected by relative majority and three by proportional representation. The current president of the municipality is Arturo León Balvanera.

== Demographics ==
In the 2010 Mexican Census, the municipality of Jiménez recorded a population of 13,275 inhabitants living in 3851 households. The 2015 Intercensal Survey estimated a population of 12,426 inhabitants in Jiménez.

There are 25 localities in the municipality, of which only the municipal seat Villa Jiménez is classified as urban. It recorded a population of 4249 inhabitants in the 2010 Census.

== Economy ==
The main economic activity in Jiménez is agriculture. Corn is the main crop, followed by sorghum and forage oats. Chicken, cattle and pigs are also raised.
