= José Luis Esquivel Zalpa =

Mexican politician

- Born: 15 November 1953 (age 72); Paracho, Michoacán, Mexico
- Occupation: Deputy
- Political party: PRD

José Luis Esquivel Zalpa (born 15 November 1953) is a Mexican politician affiliated with the Party of the Democratic Revolution (PRD). In the 2012 general election he was elected to the Chamber of Deputies to represent Michoacán's seventh district during the 62nd session of Congress. He also served briefly as a deputy during 2003 as the alternate of Jesús Garibay García in Michoacán's 9th.
