= Cortijo Nuevo & Colonia Emiliano Zapata =

Settlement in Coeneo, Mexico

Cortijo Nuevo & Colonia Emiliano Zapata Cortijo Nuevo y Colonia Emiliano Zapata
- Township
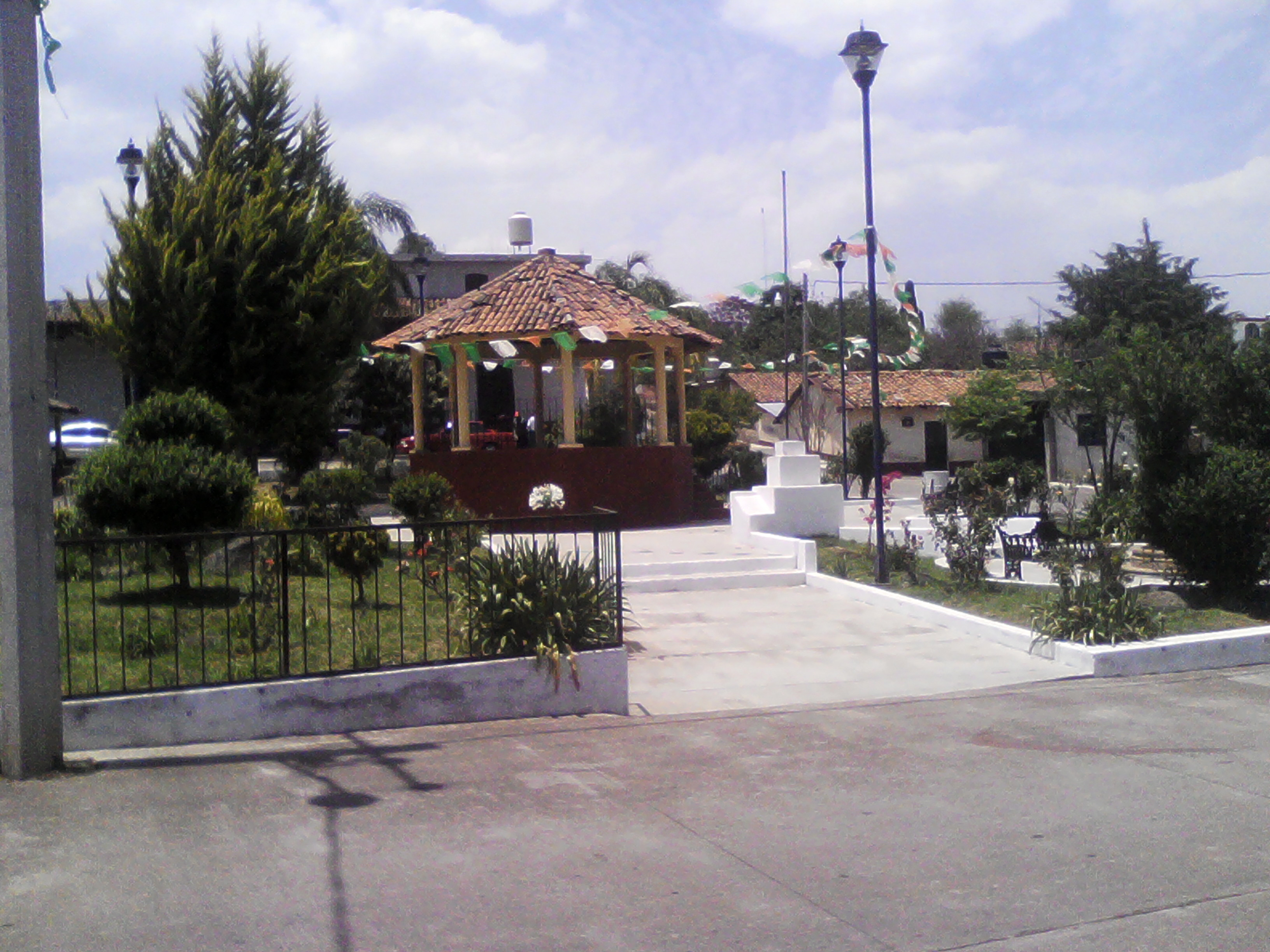
- C. Nuevo and Col. E. Zapata downtown
- Interactive map of Cortijo Nuevo & Colonia Emiliano Zapata
- Coordinates: 19.782500°N 101.703056°W
- Country: Mexico
- State: Michoacán
- Municipality: Coeneo
- Established: 1584
- Municipal seat: Coeneo de la Libertad
- Highest elevation: 2,050 m (6,730 ft)
- Lowest elevation: 1,998 m (6,555 ft)

Population
  - Total: 901
  - Population Cortijo Nuevo: 489
  - Population Col. E. Zapata: 412
- Year 2020
- Time zone: UTC-6
- Postal code: 58410

Cortijo Nuevo and Colonia Emiliano Zapata are two communities that form a single settlement bearing those same names; they share infrastructure and services, including streets and the potable water network. Both localities belong to the municipality of Coeneo in the state of Michoacán.

== Etymology ==
A cortijo is a type of traditional rural dwelling (akin to the German Bauernhof, also known as a farmhouse in English) in the southern half of Spain, including all of Andalusia and parts of Extremadura and Castile-La Mancha.

Emiliano Zapata Salazar was a Mexican revolutionary and guerrilla leader. He was a leading figure in the Mexican Revolution of 1910–1920, the main leader of the people's revolution in the Mexican state of Morelos, and the inspiration of the agrarian movement called Zapatismo.

== History ==
Cortijo Nuevo originated with the construction of a water-powered wheat mill (reason why both communities are known locally as "El Molino.") in 1584 at the San Juan de La Vega "Cortijo" (estate). It was managed by Juan Sandoval Samaniego—son of Juan Infante, an "encomendero" (grocer) of the Tarascan regions of Comanja, La Sierra, and La Laguna. In 1677, the San Juan de la Vega estate was leased to the Indigenous people of Nahuatzen; it later passed into the hands of the landowner Pedro de Carriedo del Corral, who also owned the Bellas Fuentes estate.

The division between the communities arose during the post-Mexican Revolution land redistribution; the residents of Cortijo Nuevo fully supported the allocation of land, whereas the inhabitants of Emiliano Zapata—preferring to beg for alms rather than dispossess their employer—refused to participate, resulting in a lack of the necessary signatures. Consequently, the residents of Cortijo Nuevo recruited settlers from other communities to ensure the redistribution could proceed. Ultimately, the agrarian redistribution was carried out and both communities were established on May 1, 1938; however, the property titles were not issued until 1946, during the presidency of Manuel Ávila Camacho.

== Climate and hydrography ==
In Cortijo Nuevo and Emiliano Zapata, there are various springs that give rise to the "Cortijo Stream," which flows into the "Patera Creek," one of the tributaries of the Angulo River within the Lerma-Santiago River basin. The average annual temperature is 17°C, ranging from -5°C to 35°C, and average annual precipitation is around 1,350 mm.

== Demography ==
In 2005, the community of Cortijo Nuevo had 522 inhabitants and Emiliano Zapata had 424, making a combined total of 946 inhabitants. By 2010, Cortijo Nuevo recorded 536 inhabitants while Emiliano Zapata remained at 424, resulting in a total of 960 inhabitants. The population growth across both communities was only 14 inhabitants—an increase of just 1.48%. By 2020, the community's population stood at 901, representing a 6.1% decrease compared to 2010.

Population census since 1995

Year	Cortijo Nuevo total (male/female)	Emiliano Zapata total (male/female)	Total total (male/female)
1995	452 (196m/256f)	705 (326m/379f)	1157 (522m/635f)
2000	531 (242m/289f)	459 (211m/248f)	990 (453m/537f)
2005	522 (232m/290f)	424 (193m/231f)	946 (425m/503f)
2010	536 (259m/277f)	424 (192m/232f)	960 (451m/509f)
2020	489 (232m/257f)	412 (194m/218f)	901 (426m/475f)

== Infrastructure and services ==
The following public areas exist in the settlement.

- Sigmund Freud Kindergarten
- Plan de Ayala Elementary School
- Josefa Ortiz de Domínguez Elementary School
- José María Morelos y Pavón Telesecondary School
- IMSS-Bienestar Clinic
- "Aguablanca" Bullring
- 2 Basketball courts
- 1 Soccer court
- Downtown square

== Customs and traditions ==
- Easter Week Basketball Tournament: This is one of the region's most important basketball tournaments. It opens on Palm Sunday and concludes on Holy Saturday; its history dates back to April 9, 1974, when a group of enthusiastic athletes organized the event to foster interest in the sport within the community.
- Festivities in honor of the Lord of the Poison ("Señor del Veneno"): held on September 14 and 15, featuring masses at the Church of Our Lady of Guadalupe, rodeo, and night party.
- Festivities in honor of the Virgin of Guadalupe: These are the community's most important celebrations (patron saint festivities), held on December 11, 12, 13, and 14. Events include masses, first communions, and confirmations at the Church of Our Lady of Guadalupe, as well as bullfights and festive parties.

=== Myths and legends ===
The Devil's Footprint (La Pata del Diablo) near to Cortijo Nuevo, Michoacán in Coeneo Municipality

- The Devil's Footprint: A mile's walk from the soccer field, there is a geographical spot known locally as "The Devil's Footprint" (La pata del diablo). It consists of a rock with various shapes marked on its surface—most notably those resembling a large human footprint, a rooster's track, and a goat's hoofprint—and the site is associated with a legend that goes as follows:

The Devil escaped from Hell to torment the people of Michoacán but was caught by the Archangel Michael, to whom he proposed a wager: a long-jump contest. If the Devil won, he would be allowed to roam the earth freely; otherwise, he would never leave Hell. The challenge began in Uruapan, where the Archangel Michael covered the distance to Guanajuato in a single leap. The Devil, however, thinking he was unobserved, ran to Pátzcuaro and made his first jump, landing in Zacapu (the municipality of Coeneo was once part of Zacapu). There, he gathered momentum once more—leaving a mark on the aforementioned stone—to leap all the way to Huango (now Villa Morelos), from where he jumped again to Moroleón. Believing his trick had gone unnoticed, he went to claim his prize from Michael; the Archangel, wise to the ruse, hurled him onto a hill near Puruándiro. Nevertheless, despite the deception, the Archangel Michael allowed the Devil to roam freely along the route he had taken during the wager throughout the days of Lent—which is why it is said that, during Lent, one might encounter the Devil anywhere between Uruapan and Moroleón.
