= Cheranástico =

Town in Mexico

Chéran Atzicurín, commonly known as Cheranástico, is a small town in Michoacán, Paracho, Mexico. Its coordinates are 19.7000° N, 102.0156° W, and is approximately 117.8 kilometers (73.2 miles) west from the state capital Morelia.
