= Abdallán Guzmán =

Mexican politician

Abdallán Guzmán Cruz
- Born: 18 March 1954 (age 72); Zacapu, Michoacán, Mexico
- Education: Licenciatura en Economía por la Escuela de Economía de la Universidad Michoacana de San Nicolás de Hidalgo 1982 Doctorado en Educación con especialidad en Currículum, Universidad de Guadalajara 1996 Doctorado en Ciencias Sociales en la Universidad Autónoma Metropolitana Xochimilco 2000
- Occupations: Político, Historiador, Economista, Pedagogo, Guerrillero, Sociólogo
- Political party: PRD

Abdallán Guzmán Cruz (born 18 March 1954) is a Mexican politician affiliated with the Party of the Democratic Revolution (PRD). In the 2003 mid-terms he was elected to the Chamber of Deputies to represent Michoacán's seventh district during the 59th session of Congress.
