= Nahuatzen =

- Municipality
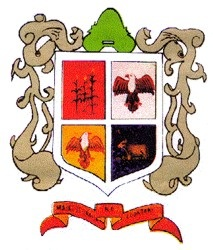
- Coat of arms

- Location in Michoacán

- Location in Mexico
- Coordinates: 19°39′13″N 101°54′57″W
- Country: Mexico
- State: Michoacán
- Established: 10 December 1831
- Seat: Nahuatzen

Government
  - President: Mayra Lucía Morales Morales

Area
  - Total: 305.057 km^{2} (117.783 sq mi)
- Elevation (of seat): 2,414 m (7,920 ft)

Population (2010 Census)
  - Total: 27,174
  - Estimate (2015 Intercensal Survey): 28,074
  - Density: 89.078/km^{2} (230.71/sq mi)
  - Seat: 10,283
- Time zone: UTC-6 (Central)
- Postal codes: 60280–60287
- Area code: 423

Nahuatzen is a municipality in the Mexican state of Michoacán. It is located approximately 75 kilometres (47 mi) west of the state capital of Morelia.

== Geography ==
The municipality of Nahuatzen is located in the Tarascan Plateau west of Lake Pátzcuaro at an elevation between 2,300 and 3,300 metres (7,500–10,800 ft). It borders the municipalities of Zacapu to the north, Erongarícuaro to the east, Tingambato to the south, Uruapan to the southwest, Paracho to the west, and Cherán to the northwest. The municipality covers an area of 305.057 square kilometres (117.783 sq mi) and comprises 0.52% of the state's area.

As of 2009, the land cover in Nahuatzen consists of temperate forest (47%) and grassland (6%). Another 44% of the land is used for agriculture and 2% consists of urban areas. The western half of Nahuatzen is in the Balsas River basin, the northeastern portion drains into the Lerma River, and the southeastern portion drains into Lake Pátzcuaro.

Nahuatzen has a temperate climate with rain in the summer. Average temperatures in the municipality range between 12 and 16 °C (54–61 °F), and average annual precipitation ranges between 1,000 and 1,500 millimetres (39–59 in).

== History ==
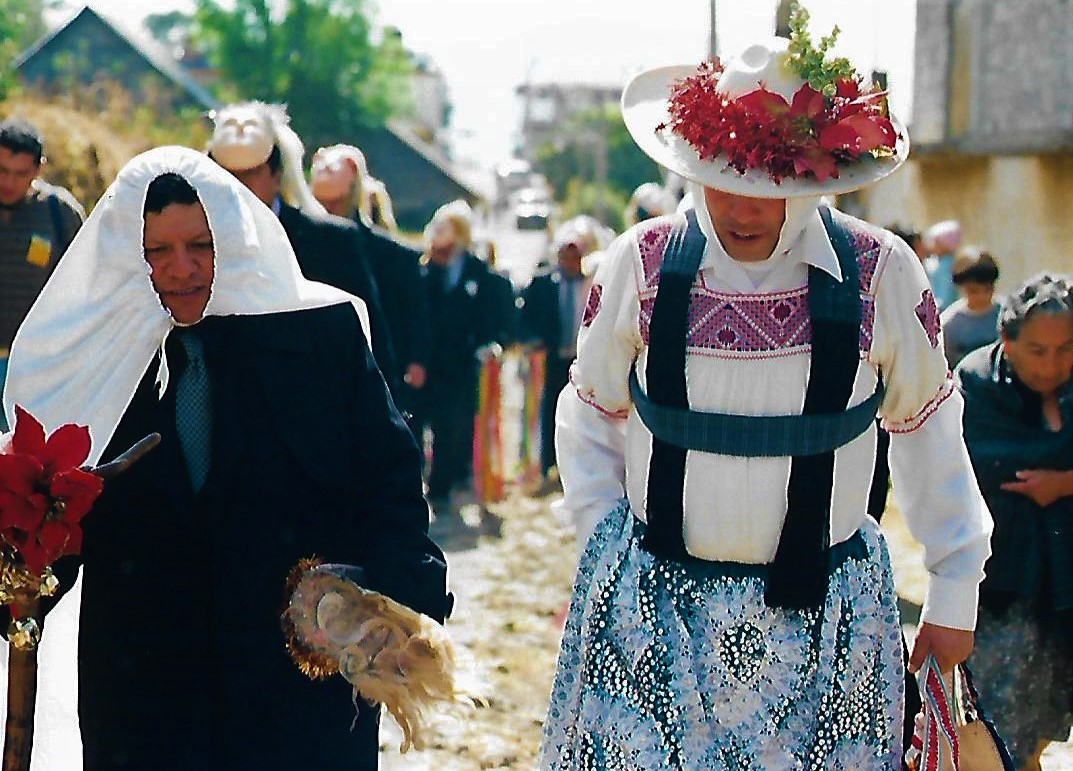
Participants in a festival in Nahuatzen.

In the Purépecha language, Nahuatzen means "place where it freezes". According to oral tradition, it was founded in the mid-16th century by people from the settlement of Xaracatan located about 3.5 kilometres (2.2 mi) to the southeast. It is depicted in the Lienzo de Nahuatzen, a cloth painting dating to the 17th or 18th century. Nahuatzen was one of the 61 municipalities created in Michoacán in 1831.

== Administration ==
The governance of Nahuatzen has been a source of tension that has periodically erupted in violence. In principle, resources are to be shared between an Indigenous Citizens' Council, which was set up in 2015 and recognized by the state and federal governments in 2017; and the municipal government, which comprises a president, a councillor (Spanish: síndico), and seven trustees (regidores), four elected by relative majority and three by proportional representation. The current president of the municipality is Mayra Lucía Morales Morales, who was appointed after the previously elected president David Eduardo Otlica Avilés was murdered in 2019.

== Demographics ==
In the 2010 Mexican Census, the municipality of Nahuatzen recorded a population of 27,174 inhabitants living in 6193 households. The 2015 Intercensal Survey estimated a population of 28,074 inhabitants in Nahuatzen.

There are 10 localities in the municipality, of which five are classified as urban:

- the municipal seat Nahuatzen, which recorded a population of 10,283 inhabitants in the 2010 Census;
- Comachuén, which recorded a population of 4762 inhabitants in 2010;
- Turícuaro, which recorded a population of 3388 inhabitants in 2010;
- Sevina, which recorded a population of 3344 inhabitants in 2010; and
- Arantepacua, which recorded a population of 2707 inhabitants in 2010.

In the 2015 Intercensal Survey, 92.86% of people in the municipality identified themselves as indigenous. The 2010 Census recorded 9789 Purépecha speakers constituting 36% of the population in Nahuatzen.

The lack of economic opportunities in Nahuatzen has caused many of people to find work elsewhere in Mexico and the United States. Sarasota, Florida is home to a community of people from Nahuatzen which numbers in the hundreds, Upstate New York is home to vegetable farm workers from Comachuén, and Tijuana has a community of Purépecha who emigrated from Arantepacua beginning in the 1980s.

== Economy ==
The main economic activities in Nahuatzen are agriculture, corn being the main crop, and forestry.

Remittances from the United States have enabled families in Comachuén to maintain artisan traditions of embroidered textiles, woodworking and construction.
