= Armando Martínez (cyclist) =

Mexican cyclist

Amando Martínez
Personal information
- Born: 28 December 1931 Zacapu, Mexico
- Died: 7 June 1969 (aged 37)

Cycling career
- Sport: Cycling

Armando Martínez (28 December 1931 – 7 June 1969) was a Mexican cyclist. He competed in the team time trial at the 1960 Summer Olympics.
