= Huaniqueo =

- Municipality
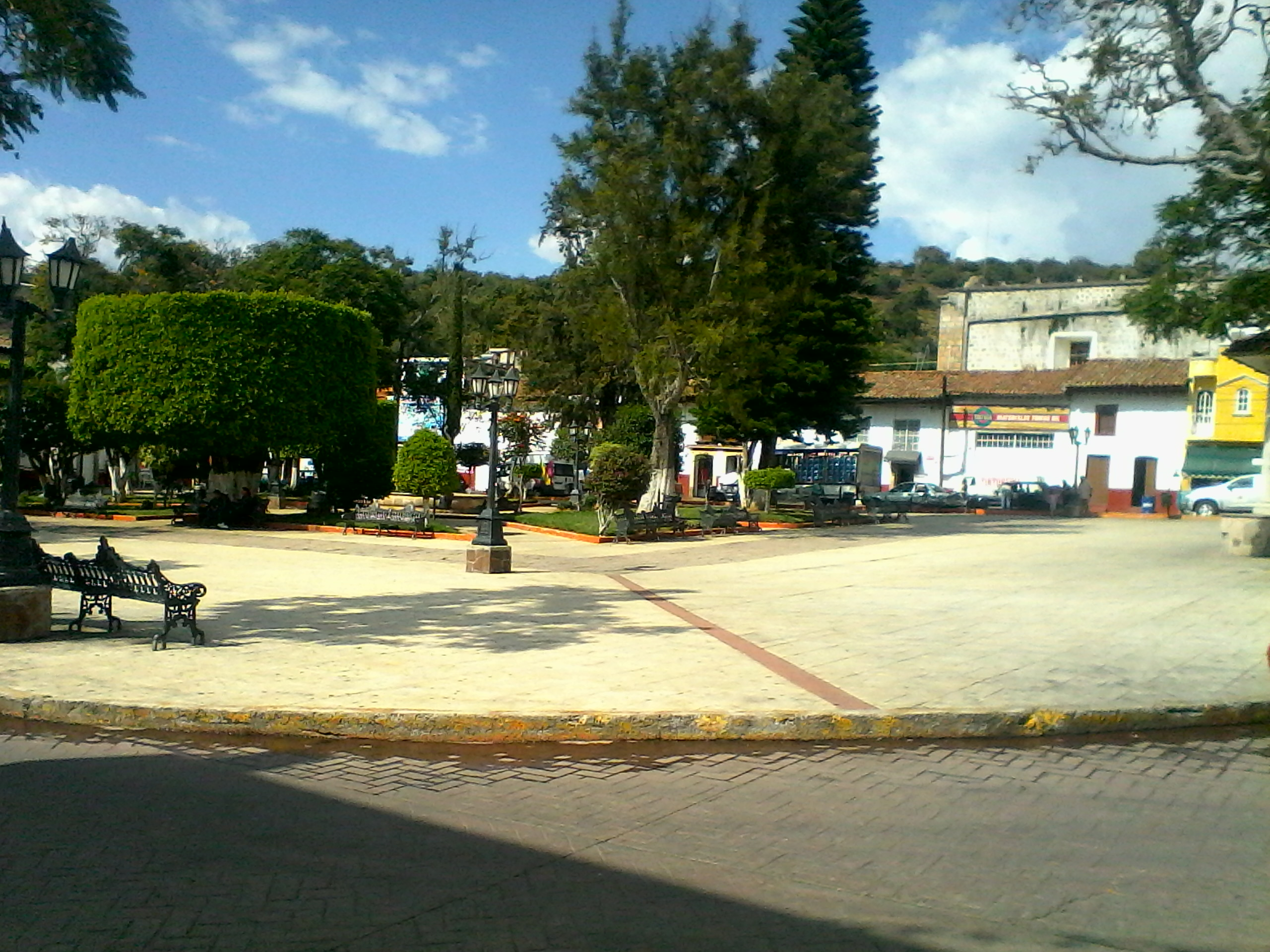
- Plaza de Armas of Huaniqueo de Morales

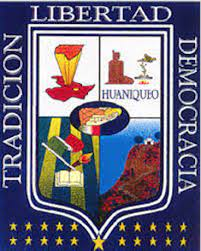
- Coat of arms

- Location in Michoacán and Mexico Huaniqueo (Mexico)
- Coordinates: 19°53′57″N 101°30′17″W
- Country: Mexico
- State: Michoacán
- Established: 15 March 1825
- Seat: Huaniqueo de Morales

Government
  - President: María Trinidad Vázquez Herrera

Area
  - Total: 201.129 km^{2} (77.656 sq mi)
- Elevation (of seat): 2,044 m (6,706 ft)

Population (2010 Census)
  - Total: 7,983
  - Estimate (2015 Intercensal Survey): 8,093
  - Density: 39.69/km^{2} (102.8/sq mi)
  - Seat: 2,566
- Time zone: UTC-6 (Central)
- Postal codes: 58360–58399
- Area code: 454
- Website: Official website

Huaniqueo is a municipality in the Mexican state of Michoacán. It is located approximately 40 kilometres (25 mi) northwest of the state capital of Morelia.

== Geography ==
The municipality of Huaniqueo is located in the Trans-Mexican Volcanic Belt in northern Michoacán at an elevation between 2,000 and 2,900 metres (6,600–9,500 ft). It borders the municipalities of Morelos to the north, Chucándiro to the east, Morelia to the south, Coeneo to the southwest, and Jiménez to the northwest. The municipality covers an area of 201.129 square kilometres (77.656 sq mi) and comprises 0.3% of the state's area.

As of 2009, the land cover in Huaniqueo consists of tropical forest (23%), temperate forest (21%), and grassland (17%). Another 36% of the land is used for agriculture and 1% consists of urban areas. Huaniqueo is drained by seasonal streams: about 94% of the municipality is in the basin of the Ángulo River, a tributary of the Lerma River, while the easternmost 6% is in the basin of Lake Cuitzeo.

Huaniqueo has a temperate climate with rain in the summer. Average temperatures in the municipality range between 14 and 18 °C (57–64 °F), and average annual precipitation ranges between 800 and 1,000 millimetres (31–39 in).

Climate data for Huaniqueo weather station at 19°47′51″N 100°59′42″W, 1858 m above sea level (1981–2010 averages, 1951–2010 extremes)
Month	Jan	Feb	Mar	Apr	May	Jun	Jul	Aug	Sep	Oct	Nov	Dec	Year
Record high °C (°F)	29.5 (85.1)	34.0 (93.2)	35.0 (95.0)	36.0 (96.8)	35.0 (95.0)	35.0 (95.0)	31.5 (88.7)	31.0 (87.8)	31.0 (87.8)	31.0 (87.8)	30.0 (86.0)	29.0 (84.2)	36.0 (96.8)
Mean daily maximum °C (°F)	22.7 (72.9)	24.6 (76.3)	27.4 (81.3)	29.4 (84.9)	29.5 (85.1)	26.6 (79.9)	24.4 (75.9)	24.4 (75.9)	24.4 (75.9)	24.5 (76.1)	24.0 (75.2)	22.7 (72.9)	25.4 (77.7)
Daily mean °C (°F)	14.7 (58.5)	16.1 (61.0)	18.4 (65.1)	20.5 (68.9)	21.5 (70.7)	20.4 (68.7)	18.9 (66.0)	18.9 (66.0)	18.8 (65.8)	17.8 (64.0)	16.2 (61.2)	14.8 (58.6)	18.1 (64.6)
Mean daily minimum °C (°F)	6.7 (44.1)	7.6 (45.7)	9.4 (48.9)	11.7 (53.1)	13.4 (56.1)	14.2 (57.6)	13.4 (56.1)	13.3 (55.9)	13.1 (55.6)	11.0 (51.8)	8.5 (47.3)	7.0 (44.6)	10.8 (51.4)
Record low °C (°F)	−3.0 (26.6)	−1.0 (30.2)	1.0 (33.8)	4.8 (40.6)	4.0 (39.2)	7.0 (44.6)	8.0 (46.4)	9.0 (48.2)	4.0 (39.2)	2.2 (36.0)	−3.0 (26.6)	−3.0 (26.6)	−3.0 (26.6)
Average precipitation mm (inches)	17.5 (0.69)	12.8 (0.50)	6.0 (0.24)	11.4 (0.45)	44.4 (1.75)	161.1 (6.34)	219.9 (8.66)	180.9 (7.12)	149.9 (5.90)	57.0 (2.24)	14.7 (0.58)	7.7 (0.30)	883.3 (34.78)
Average rainy days (≥ 1 mm)	2.8	1.5	1.2	2.3	6.3	15.4	20.5	18.9	14.8	7.2	2.3	1.5	94.7
Source: Servicio Meteorológico Nacional

== History ==
In the Purépecha language, Huaniqueo has been translated to mean either "place where corn is roasted" or "place of those who give or bring a sign". It is believed that the first settlement was of Otomi origin and was conquered by the Tarascans by 1450. After the arrival of the Spanish, the place was given the name Santa Marta Huaniqueo after its patron saint.

Huaniqueo was made a partido of Michoacán in 1825 and one of its original municipalities in 1831. On 23 April 1861, Epitacio Huerta, governor of Michoacán, renamed the municipal seat Huaniqueo de Morales in honour of the parish priest Juan José Pastor Morales, a supporter of the struggle for Mexican independence.

== Administration ==
The municipal government comprises a president, a councillor (Spanish: síndico), and seven trustees (regidores), four elected by relative majority and three by proportional representation. The current president of the municipality is María Trinidad Vázquez Herrera.

== Demographics ==
In the 2010 Mexican Census, the municipality of Huaniqueo recorded a population of 7983 inhabitants living in 2369 households. The 2015 Intercensal Survey estimated a population of 8093 inhabitants in Huaniqueo.

There are 27 localities in the municipality, of which only the municipal seat Huaniqueo de Morales is classified as urban. It recorded a population of 2566 inhabitants in the 2010 Census.

== Economy ==
The main economic activity in Huaniqueo is agriculture. The municipality is responsible for 15% of Mexico's total lentil production, behind only Coeneo which accounts for 57%. There is low-level production of other crops and livestock for local consumption.
