= Humberto Alonso Razo =

Mexican politician

- Born: 9 August 1958 (age 67); Michoacán, Mexico
- Occupation: Politician
- Political party: PRD

Humberto Wilfrido Alonso Razo (born 9 August 1958) is a Mexican politician affiliated with the Party of the Democratic Revolution (PRD). In the 2006 general election he was elected to the Chamber of Deputies to represent Michoacán's seventh district during the 60th session of Congress.
