= Morelos, Michoacán =

Morelos
- Municipality
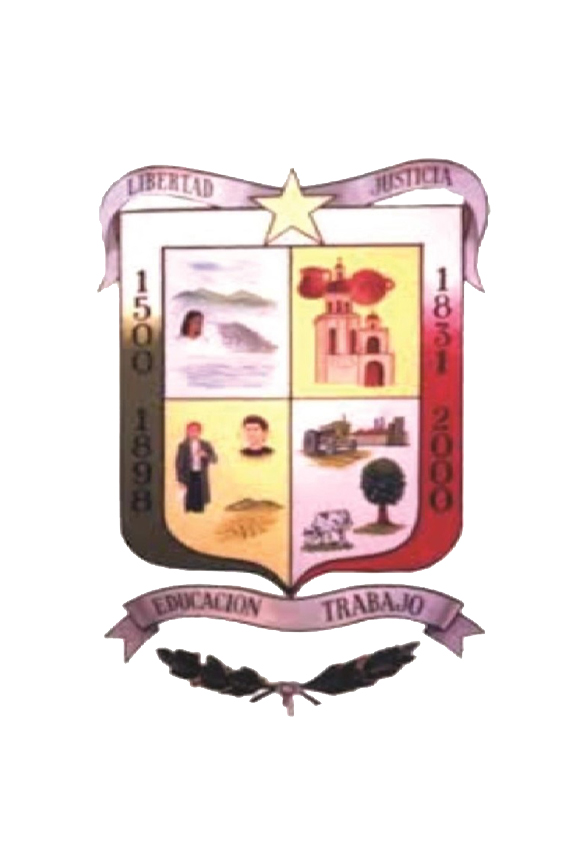
- Coat of arms

- Location in Michoacán and Mexico Morelos (Mexico)
- Coordinates: 20°00′12″N 101°24′52″W
- Country: Mexico
- State: Michoacán
- Established: 10 December 1831
- Seat: Villa Morelos

Government
  - President: José Guadalupe Coria Solís

Area
  - Total: 183.927 km^{2} (71.015 sq mi)
- Elevation (of seat): 2,299 m (7,543 ft)

Population (2010 Census)
  - Total: 8,091
  - Estimate (2015 Intercensal Survey): 7,806
  - Density: 43.99/km^{2} (113.9/sq mi)
  - Seat: 2,446
- Time zone: UTC-6 (Central)
- Postal codes: 58800–58807
- Area code: 438
- Website: Official website

Morelos is a municipality in the Mexican state of Michoacán. It is located approximately 40 kilometres (25 mi) northwest of the state capital of Morelia. The municipal seat is at Villa Morelos.

== Geography ==
The municipality of Morelos is located in the Trans-Mexican Volcanic Belt in northern Michoacán at an elevation between 2,100 and 2,700 metres (6,900–8,900 ft). It borders the Michoacanese municipalities of Puruándiro to the northwest, Huandacareo to the east, Chucándiro to the southeast, Huaniqueo to the southwest, and Jiménez to the northwest. It also borders the municipality of Yuriria in Guanajuato to the northeast. The municipality covers an area of 183.927 square kilometres (71.015 sq mi) and comprises 0.31% of the state's area.

As of 2009, the land cover in Morelos consists of temperate forest (30%), grassland (13%), and tropical forest (5%). Another 49% of the land is used for agriculture and 2% consists of urban areas. Morelos is located in the Lerma River basin. There are small reservoirs named Epitacio Huerta and Caballerias in the municipality, which are used for agricultural irrigation.

Morelos has a temperate climate with rain in the summer. Average temperatures in the municipality range between 14 and 18 °C (57–64 °F), and average annual precipitation ranges between 800 and 1,000 millimetres (31–39 in).

== History ==
The place now known as Morelos was originally called Huango, and was part of the Purépecha Empire in pre-Hispanic Mexico. Huango was one of the 61 municipalities created in Michoacán in 1831. In 1898, the municipal seat was renamed Huango de Morelos. In 1902 the seat was renamed Villa Morelos and the municipality itself renamed Morelos.

== Administration ==
The municipal government comprises a president, a councillor (Spanish: síndico), and seven trustees (regidores), four elected by relative majority and three by proportional representation. The current president of the municipality is José Guadalupe Coria Solís.

== Demographics ==
In the 2010 Mexican Census, the municipality of Morelos recorded a population of 8091 inhabitants living in 2123 households. The 2015 Intercensal Survey estimated a population of 7806 inhabitants in Morelos.

There are 31 localities in the municipality, of which only the municipal seat Villa Morelos is classified as urban. It recorded a population of 2446 inhabitants in the 2010 Census.

== Economy ==
The main economic activity in Morelos is agriculture. Corn is the main crop, followed by forage oats.
