= Arturo Estrada Hernández =

Mexican painter (born 1925)

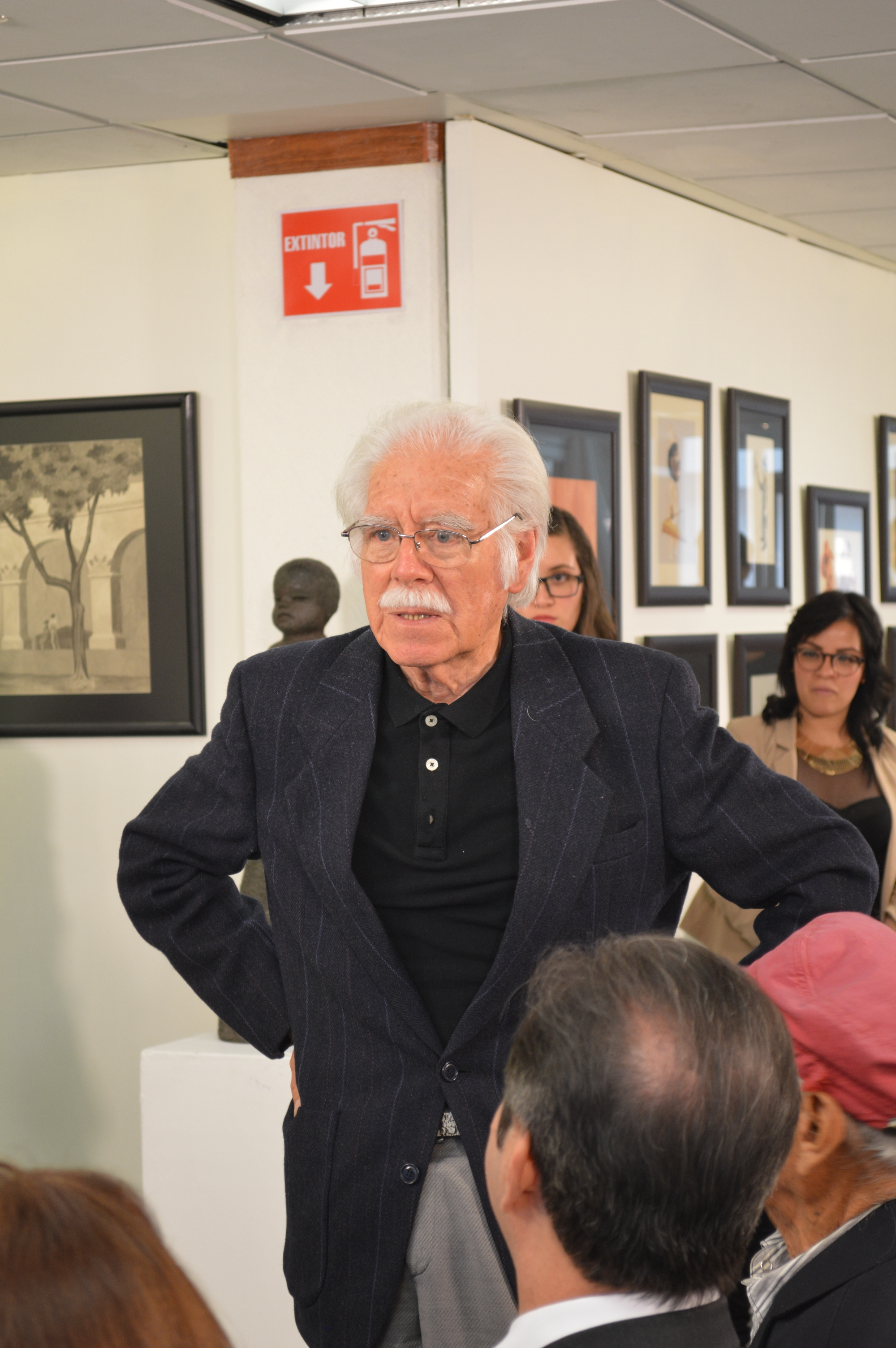
- Estrada speaking at an event at the Televisión Educativa in Mexico City
- Born: July 30, 1925 (age 101); Panindícuaro, Michoacán
- Education: "La Esmeralda"
- Known for: Painting
- Movement: Mexican muralism

Arturo Estrada Hernández (born July 30, 1925) is a Mexican painter, one of a group of Frida Kahlo’s students called “Los Fridos.” Estrada is mostly known for his mural work, which remains faithful to the figurative style and ideology of Mexican muralism. He has created murals in various parts of Mexico in both public and private places, including a 1988 mural found in the Centro Médico metro station in Mexico City. He has also taught classes at the Escuela Nacional de Pintura, Escultura y Grabado "La Esmeralda", where he was a student, since 1948 and continues to give classes there and other venues. He lives in his birthplace: Panindicuaro, Michoacán.

== Life ==
He was born in Panindícuaro, Michoacán. When he was a child he began to learn art at the workshop of Miguel Moreno.

In 1941, at age seventeen he moved to Mexico City to study high school. At the same time, he studied at the Escuela Nacional de Pintura, Escultura y Grabado "La Esmeralda" along with Jorge Chávez Carrillo under Diego Rivera, Raúl Anguiano, José Chávez Morado and Frida Kahlo. In 1943, Antonio M. Ruiz became director of La Esmeralda and Estrada moved on to become one of Frida Kahlo's private students. They were a group of four which also included Arturo García Bustos, Guillermo Monroy and Fanny Rabel. With this group, Estrada began mural painting, working on a wall of a pulque bar called La Rosita, which since has been destroyed.

He continues to live and work in Mexico City.

== Career ==
Interview (in Spanish) with the artist at the Tec de Monterrey, Mexico City campus

In 1944, he began to work on his own, best known for his mural work. First he joined a group called the Pintores Jóvenes Revolucionarios, which supported the Mexican muralism movement. In 1944, he collaborated with Diego Rivera on the mosaics at the Anahuacalli Museum and later on the Ciudad Universitaria stadium. He assisted José Clemente Orozco on the exterior mural at the Escuela Normal, in 1953, he assisted Juan O'Gorman with the mosaic “El Aire” at the Secretaría de Comunicaciones y Obras Públicas.In 1961, he painted his own mural, an acrylic mural called The Youth of San Luis Potosí and The Revolution at the Casa de Juventud in that city followed by Tríptico de Independencia in Cuautla . He has also created murals for the Museo de Arte Moderno, in various houses in Mexico City, in Oaxaca, Nuevo Laredo and San Luis Potosí. In 1988, he painted the mural Medicina Tradicional y Medicina Contemporánea at the Metro Centro Médico in Mexico City. The mural was inaugurated with the opening of the station in 1988.

He has also been an easel painter as well with the first exhibition of his work occurring in 1945. Since then, he has had individual and collective exhibitions in various venues in Mexico such as the Palacio de Bellas Artes, the Museo de Ciencia y Artes of UNAM as well as in countries such as the United States, China, Canada, Venezuela, Colombia, Bulgaria, Poland, Romania and the former USSR . He had an individual exhibition at the Salón de la Plástica Mexicana in 2011. Most of his overseas showings have been with the Frente Nacional de Artes Plásticas.

He began teaching art at his former school, La Esmeralda, in 1948. From 1983 to 1985, he was its director. He was named a Professor Emeritus by the Secretaría de Educación Pública in 1988. However, he still continues to give classes at La Esmeralda as well as workshops in other places in Mexico such as the Universidad de Colima.

He received the William and Norma Copley Foundation award in Chicago in 1957 and the art teachers award from the Instituto Nacional de Bellas Artes in 1966. He became a member of the Frente Nacional de Artes Plásticas, and in 1954 was accepted as a member of the Salón de la Plástica Mexicana.

== Artistry ==
Estrada describes his work as a “mixture of the popular and the hidden.” He is known for the use of a wide variety of bright colors, and his style mixes elements of traditional Mexican folklore, typical scenery of the country, flowers and fruit. However, many of his works deal with the misery of human existence. He has produced works in acrylics, mosaics (stone and Italian) and oils, as well as murals in encaustics and fresco.

Estrada’s mural work is still faithful to the figurative style and ideology of Mexican muralism, which he believes is still very much alive in Mexico and one of the most important art expressions the country has given the world. He considers himself “a realistic painter, with a liberal ideology in tune with the people” and believe that art belongs to the people. Still believes social themes are indispensable, with misery, insecurity and lack of employment the only universals.

His easel work is more personal. His 2011 exhibition had works which experimented with elements of impressionism, neo-impressionism, constructivism and surrealism, while maintaining social themes.
