= Eugenio Calderón =

Mexican-Argentine footballer (born 1963)

Eugenio Constantino Calderón “El Chele calderon” (born 21 May 1963) is a former professional Mexican footballer active in the Primera División from 1984 to 1996.

== Career ==
Born in Zacapu, Michoacán, Calderón spent most of his life in Morelia. He played for CD Irapuato, Cruz Azul, UANL Tigres, Guadalajara and Club America. Calderón ended his career as a midfielder in the Ascenso MX team Correcaminos UAT. He scored 39 Primera División goals during his career.
