= Villa Morelos =

- Locality
- Location of Villa Morelos Villa Morelos (Mexico)
- Coordinates: 20°00′12″N 101°24′52″W
- Country: Mexico
- State: Michoacán
- Municipality: Morelos
- Elevation: 1,981 m (6,499 ft)

Population (2020)
  - Total: 2,526
- Time zone: UTC-6 (Zona Centro)
- INEGI Code: 160540001

Villa Morelos is a locality and the municipal seat of the eponymous municipality of Morelos in the Mexican state of Michoacán.

== Etymology ==
The pre-Hispanic name was Guango, a word in the Purépecha language. The name of Morelos was intended to honor a founding father of the country, José María Morelos.

== History ==
The town of Huango adopted the name of Villa Morelos on 28 May 1898, the municipality was named "municipality of Morelos" in the last days of the year 1900, and announced the first week of 1901, this change happened during the Porfirian stage, while Aristeo Mercado was governor of the state of Michoacán.

== Geography ==
Villa Morelos is located approximately at the location 19°38′43″N 101°14′13″W, at an altitude of 1981 m above sea level.

== Economy ==
The main economic activities of the town are agriculture, livestock and commerce.

== Demographics ==
According to the 2020 census, Villa Morelos had a population of 2,526 inhabitants, which represents an average growth of 0.33% per year in the period 2010-2020 based on the 2,446 inhabitants registered in the previous census. With an area of 2,969 km^{2}, in 2020 the population density was 850.9 inhabitants/km^{2}. 47.6% of the population (1203 people) were men and 52.4% (1323 people) were women.

In 2010, Villa Morelos was classified as a town with a medium degree of social vulnerability, although deficiencies in access to education (993 people with incomplete basic education) and health (1078 people without the right to health services) persisted.
