= Panindícuaro Municipality =

Panindícuaro
- Municipality
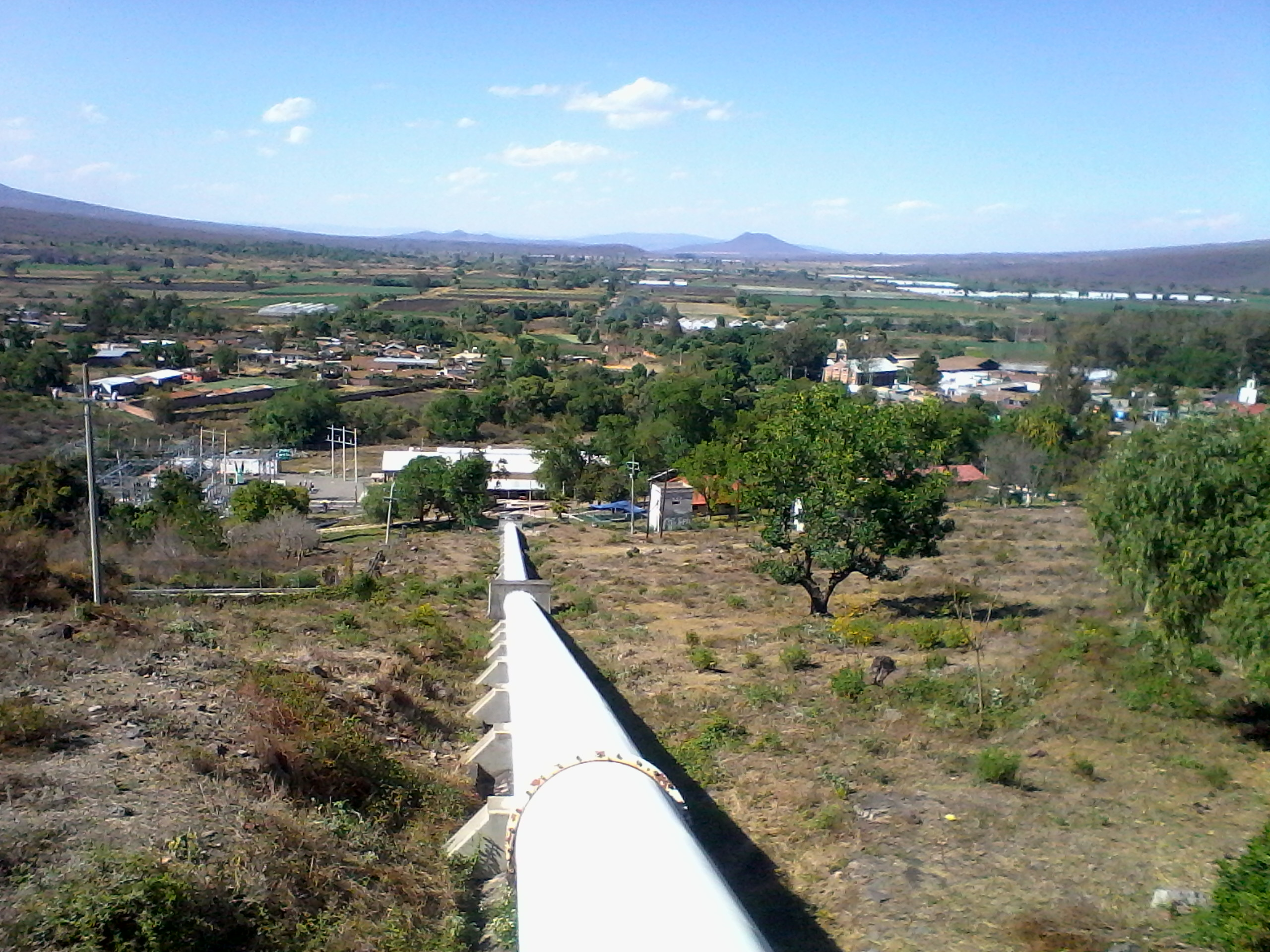

- Location in Mexico
- Coordinates: 19°59′1″N 101°45′40″W
- Country: Mexico
- State: Michoacán
- Municipal seat: Panindícuaro
- Established: 12 February 1942

Area
  - Total: 259.44 km^{2} (100.17 sq mi)

Population (2010)
  - Total: 16,064
  - Density: 61.918/km^{2} (160.37/sq mi)

Panindícuaro is a municipality in the Mexican state of Michoacán. The municipal seat lies at the town of the same name.
