= Panindícuaro =

- Town
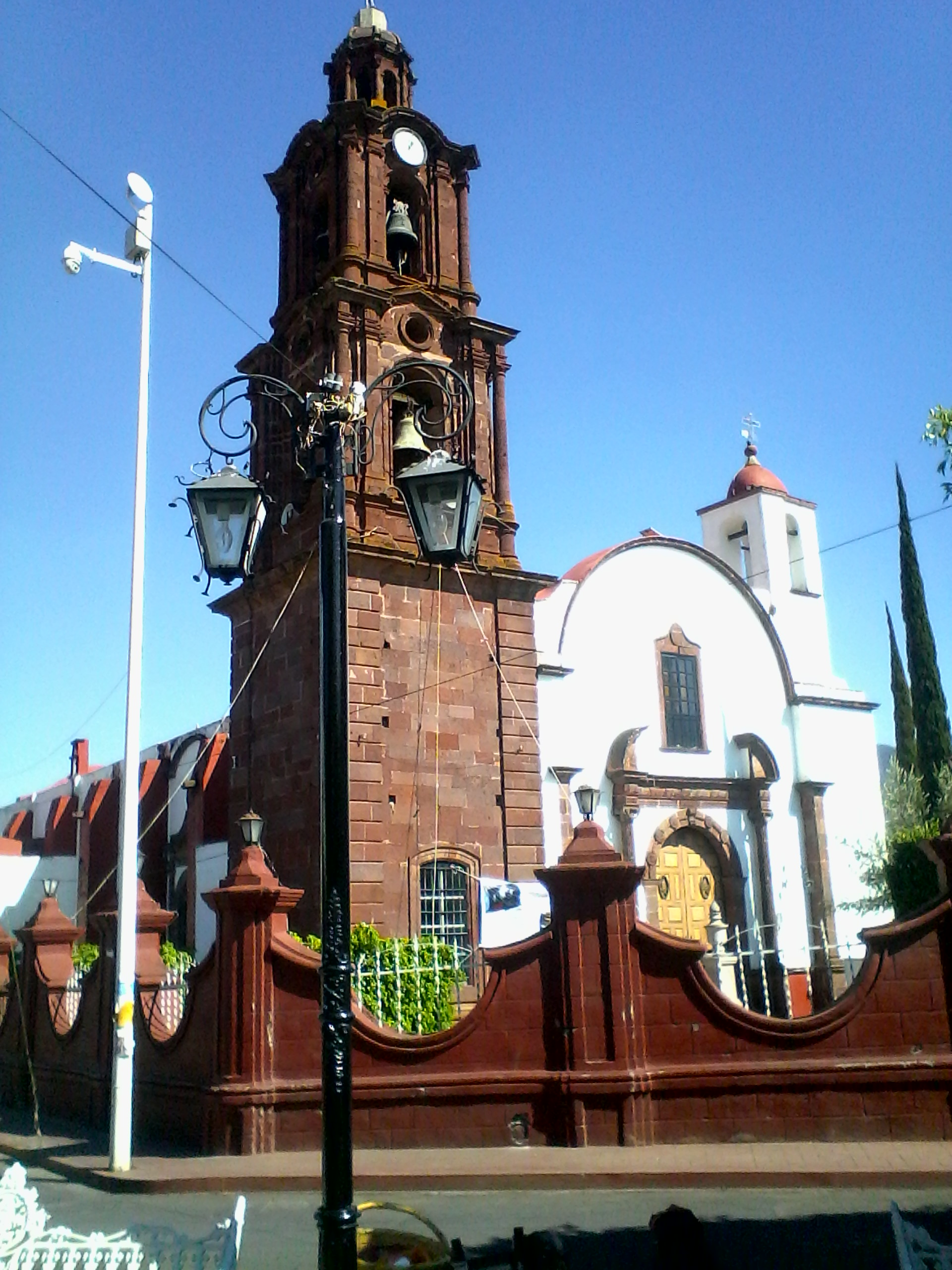

- Location in Mexico
- Coordinates: 19°58′58″N 101°45′38″W
- Country: Mexico
- State: Michoacán
- Municipality: Panindícuaro

Population (2010)
  - Total: 5,565

Panindícuaro is a town and seat of the municipality of Panindícuaro, in the central Mexican state of Michoacán. As of 2010, the town had a population of 5,565. It is the birthplace of the painter Arturo Estrada Hernández.
