= Chucándiro =

- Municipality
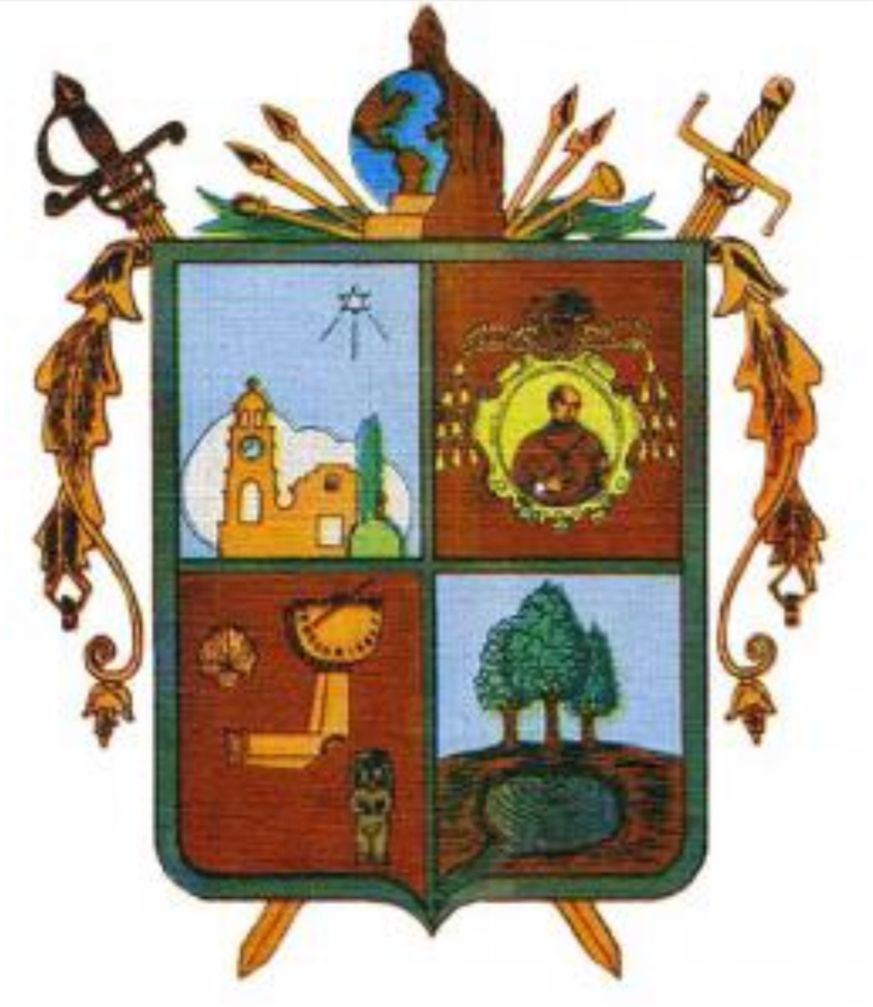
- Coat of arms

- Location within Michoacán Location within Mexico
- Coordinates: 19°54′24″N 101°20′8″W
- Country: Mexico
- State: Michoacán
- Municipal seat: Chucándiro

Government
  - Federal electoral district: Michoacán's 7th

Area
  - Total: 191.88 km^{2} (74.09 sq mi)
- Elevation: 1,850 m (6,070 ft)

Population
  - Total: 4,944
- Time zone: UTC-6 (Zona Centro)
- Website: chucandiro.gob.mx

Chucándiro is a city and its surrounding municipality in the Mexican state of Michoacán.

The municipality covers a total of 191.88 km². In the 2020 census, it reported a population of 4,944 inhabitants (48.3% men and 51.7% women), down 4.3% from 2010.
