= Coeneo de la Libertad =

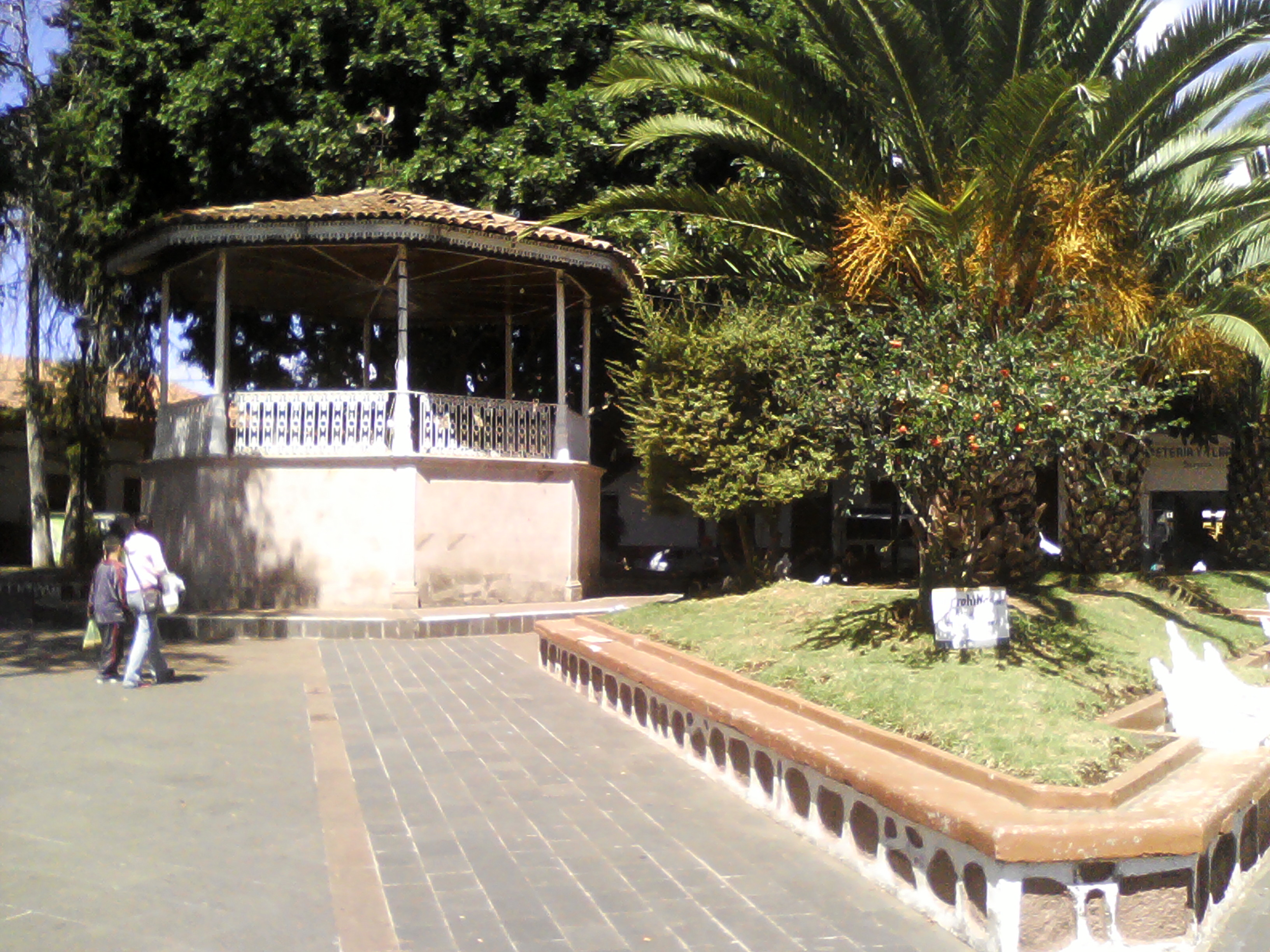

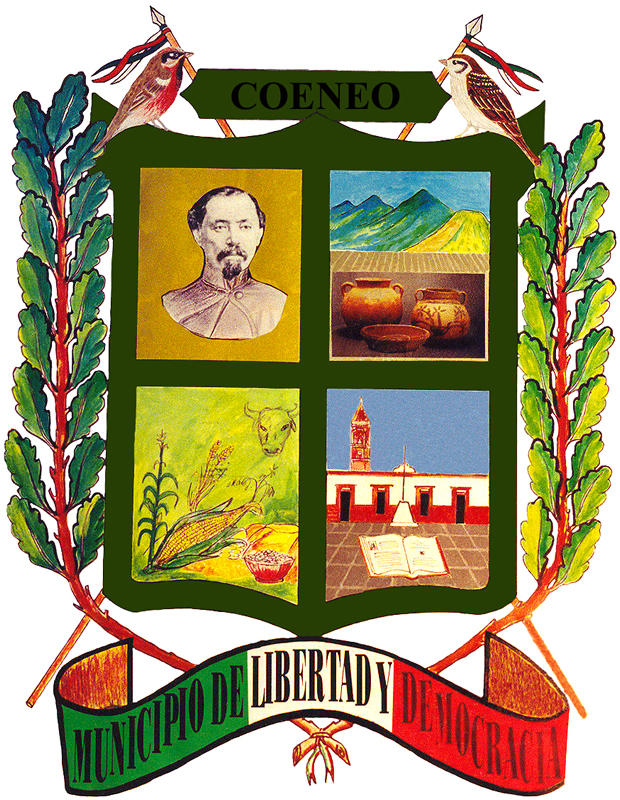
- Coat of arms
- Interactive map of Coeneo de la Libertad
- Coordinates: 19°49′19″N 101°35′07″W
- Country: Mexico
- State: Michoacán
- Municipality: Coeneo
- Founded: 1530

Government
  - Municipal President: Martin Vargas
- Time zone: UTC-6 (CST)

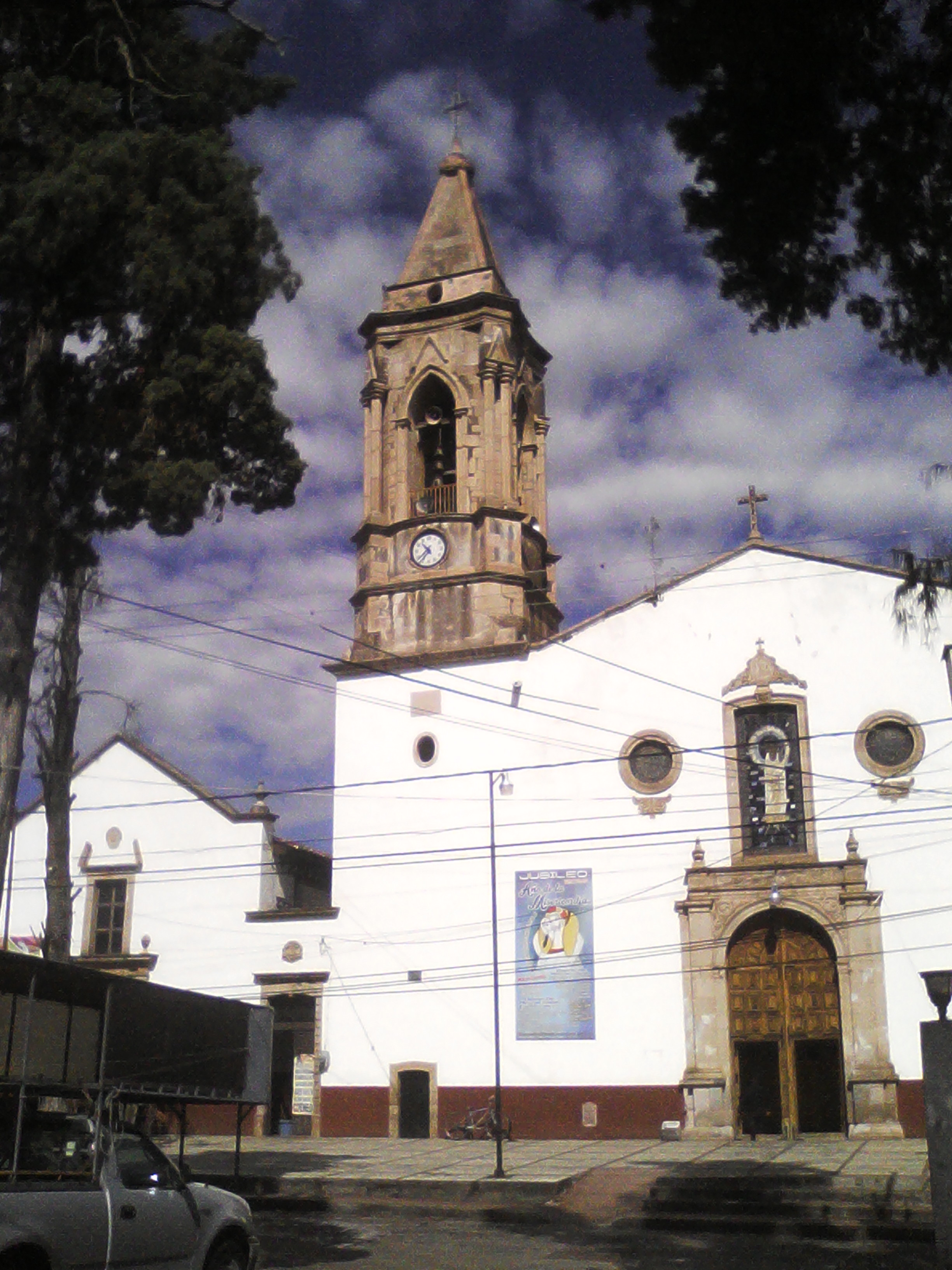
Church of Nuestra Señora del Rosario

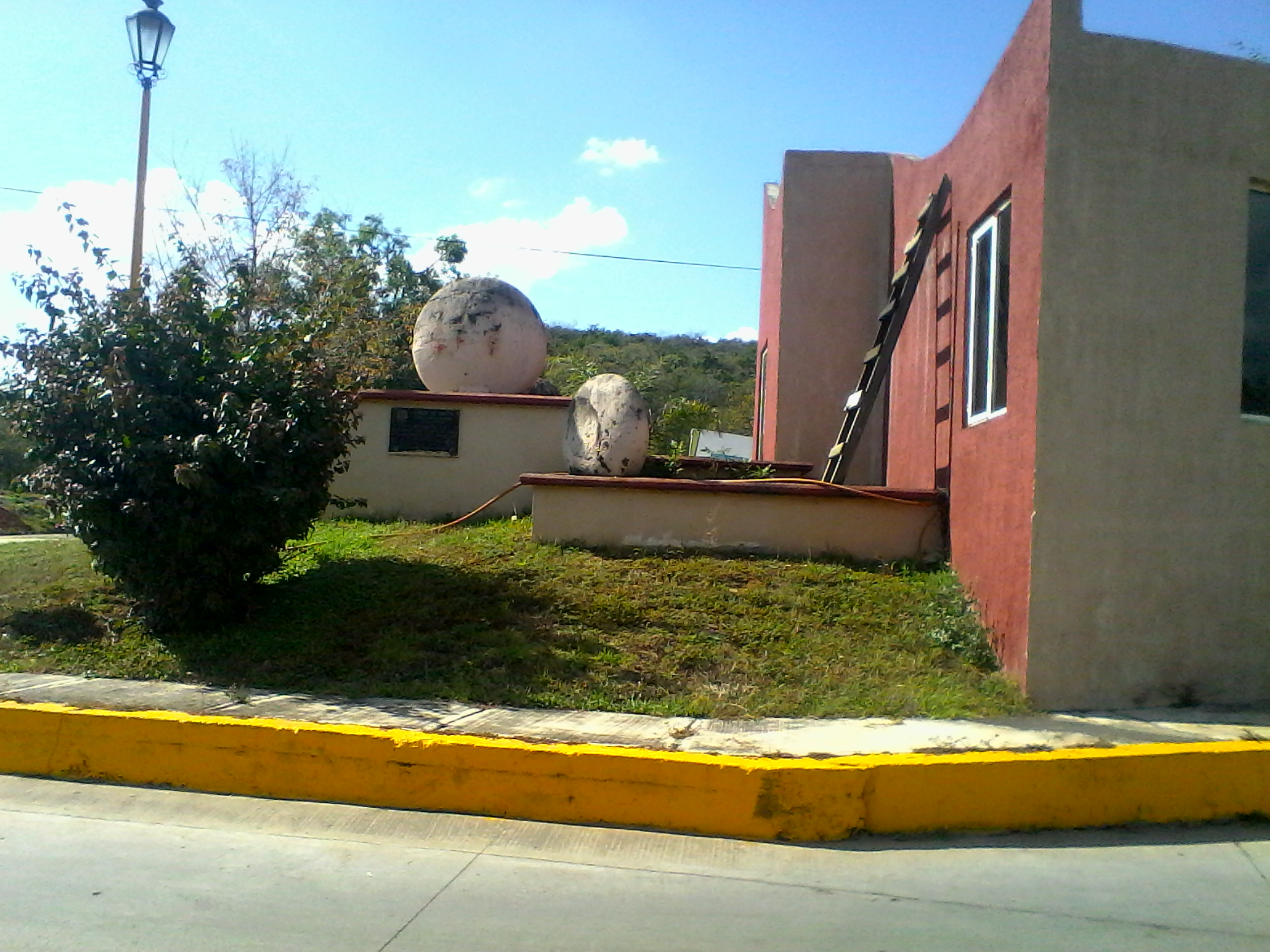
Lentil Monument in Coeneo

Coeneo de la Libertad is a town and municipal seat of the Coeneo municipality, located in the north central area of the Mexican state of Michoacán. The name Coeneo means "place of birds".

== History ==
In the year 1530 Friar Martín de la Coruña was the first to come into contact with the natives of the lands that now make up the present-day Coeneo. He quickly gained trust, affection, and respect, and convinced the natives to convert to the Catholic faith. However, the Spanish conquistador Nuño de Guzmán attempted to rob the natives of their possessions and abuse them for refusing to comply. This caused a period where the natives went back into the mountains and to destroy the progress that Martín de la Coruña had made. It was until the Friar Jacob Dacian succeeded de la Coruña that dialogue began again. An arrangement was made in 1542 for a few families to reallocate to the location now known as Coeneo due to a scarcity of water around the region. Once the new community was established plans were drafted to construct the town's church, a town square, and a patron was given "La Virgen del Rosario."

== Demographics ==
As of the census of 2005, there were 3616 people residing in the town.

== Education ==
Coeneo enjoys a diverse set of both public and private schools.

- Two pre-elementary schools
- A public elementary school
- A private elementary school - Institucion Educativa y Cultural Coeneo
- A public middle school - Escuela secundaria tecnica #61
- A COBAM (high school)
- A center for adult education

== Economy ==
The area around Coeneo is centered on agriculture where lentils and corn are the main crops cultivated. Non-agricultural industries are mainly related to construction materials, financial institutions, and small family-operated businesses.

== Transportation ==
There are several bus lines that serve the routes to Huaniqueo, Morelia or Zacapu such as "Autobuses Bellas Fuentes", "Autobuses Ciénega de Zacapu" and "Norte de Michoacán", in addition to providing a foreign and suburban collective service to Zipiajo, El Cobrero, and Tinguitiro.
