= Paracho de Verduzco =

Locality in México

Coordinates: 19°39′0″N 102°4′0″W

- Municipality
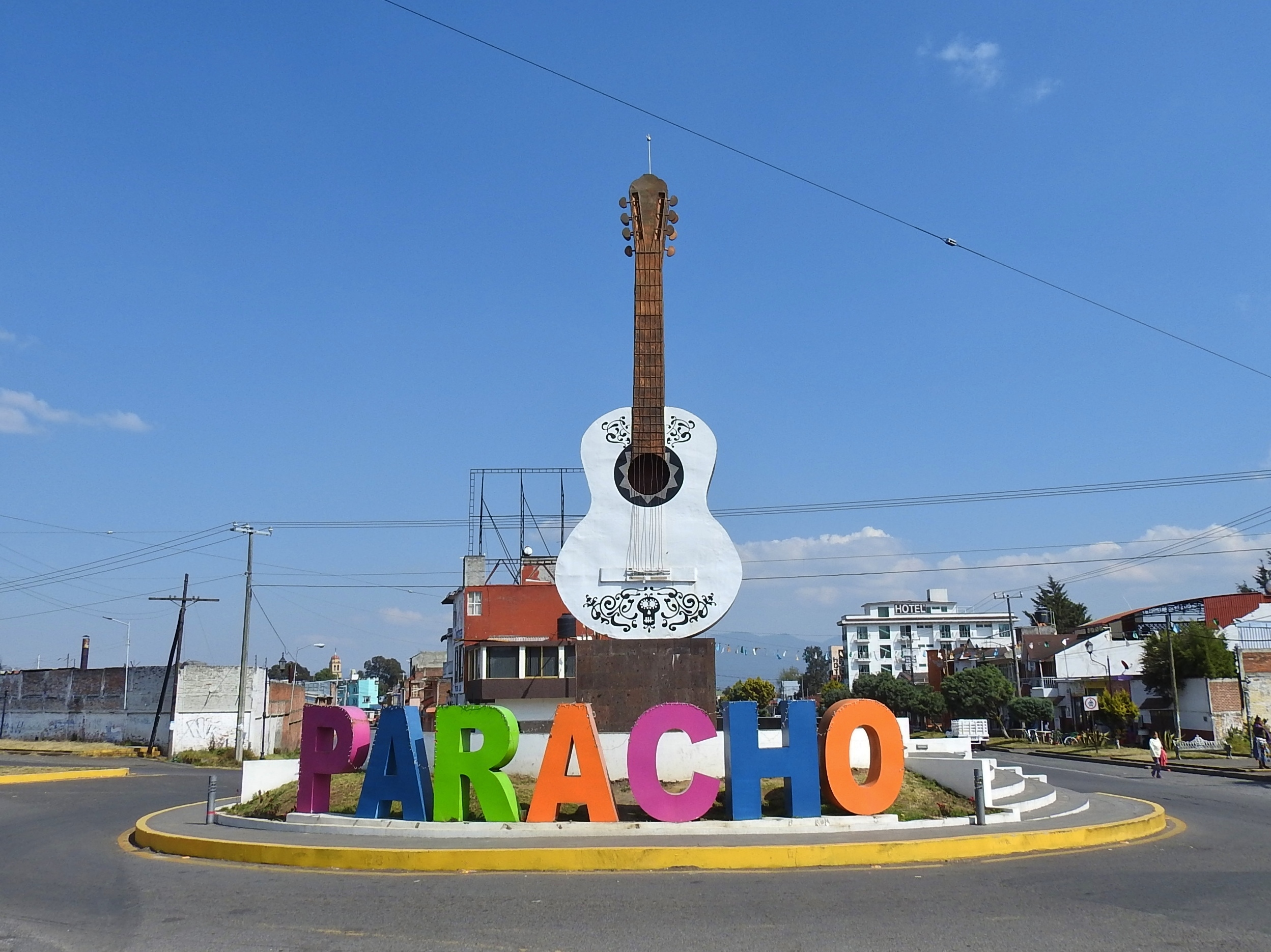

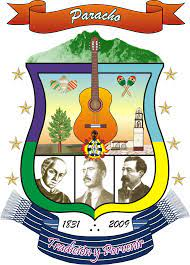
- Coat of arms

- Location in Mexico Paracho de Verduzco (Mexico)
- Country: Mexico
- State: Michoacán
- Demonym: (in Spanish)
- Time zone: UTC−6 (CST)

Paracho de Verduzco (often called Paracho) is a small city located in Michoacán, Mexico. It is located about 100 kilometers (62 miles) west of the state capital Morelia. The city serves as the municipal seat for the surrounding municipality of Paracho. It has a population of 37,464.

Paracho is well known throughout both Mexico and elsewhere in the world as a hub of lutherie. This is because the town's craftsmen are reputed to make the best sounding guitars and vihuelas in all of Mexico. The town is full of music shops that sell handmade stringed instruments. Some instruments that can be found in Paracho are: ten-string mandolins, armadillo-backed guitars (concheras) and mandolins, and acoustic bass guitars, as well as regular classical guitars and mandolins, bajo sextos, vihuelas, guitarrones and many others. Many of the stores and workshops allow visitors to watch the guitar-making process directly.

A national festival "Feria de La Guitarra" is held in Paracho once a year, usually the second week of August. Lasting nine days having its culture, gastronomic and traditions display. From its traditional "Pan" to its famous guitars, Paracho is rich in culture and traditions.

== History ==
The city remains renowned for its guitars and luthiers, a tradition dating back over 480 years. When Spanish conquistadors arrived in west-central Mexico, a priest named Vasco de Quiroga determined that each indigenous village should learn a craft to foster economic mobility and integration into the Spanish colonial system. Similar systems were established by Quiroga in Santa Clara, where copper was produced, and in Uruapan, where lacquerware was turned out. The choice to have the remote village of Paracho specialize in stringed instruments was a strategic one from Quiroga, as the area was surrounded by forests of pine; allowing raw material to be abundant and allowing many families to perfect their craft throughout the generations.

Despite the Paracho luthiers honing their craft over generations, the models produced there differ drastically from their European counterparts. Yale anthropologist Ron Fernandez, who imports guitars from Spain, noted this difference, attributing it to the methods of construction, particularly in terms of tools used. While European methods typically involve a workbench with forms, the Mexican methods remained carving wood while seated, the practices of their indigenous ancestors. For over a century, Paracho luthiers would sometimes deconstruct foreign guitars that arrived in town to enhance their craftsmanship. Eventually in the 1980s, Paracho began hosting master luthiers from Spain to refine their craft, resulting in improved guitar quality. Today, Paracho remains a place where mariachi bands and other groups can purchase good quality accessibly instruments to play throughout Mexico. It also became a popular tourist destination where tourists can buy a factory-made or handmade guitar at very affordable prices.

== See also ==
- List of guitar manufacturers
