= Zacapu =

City Michoacán, Mexico

- City
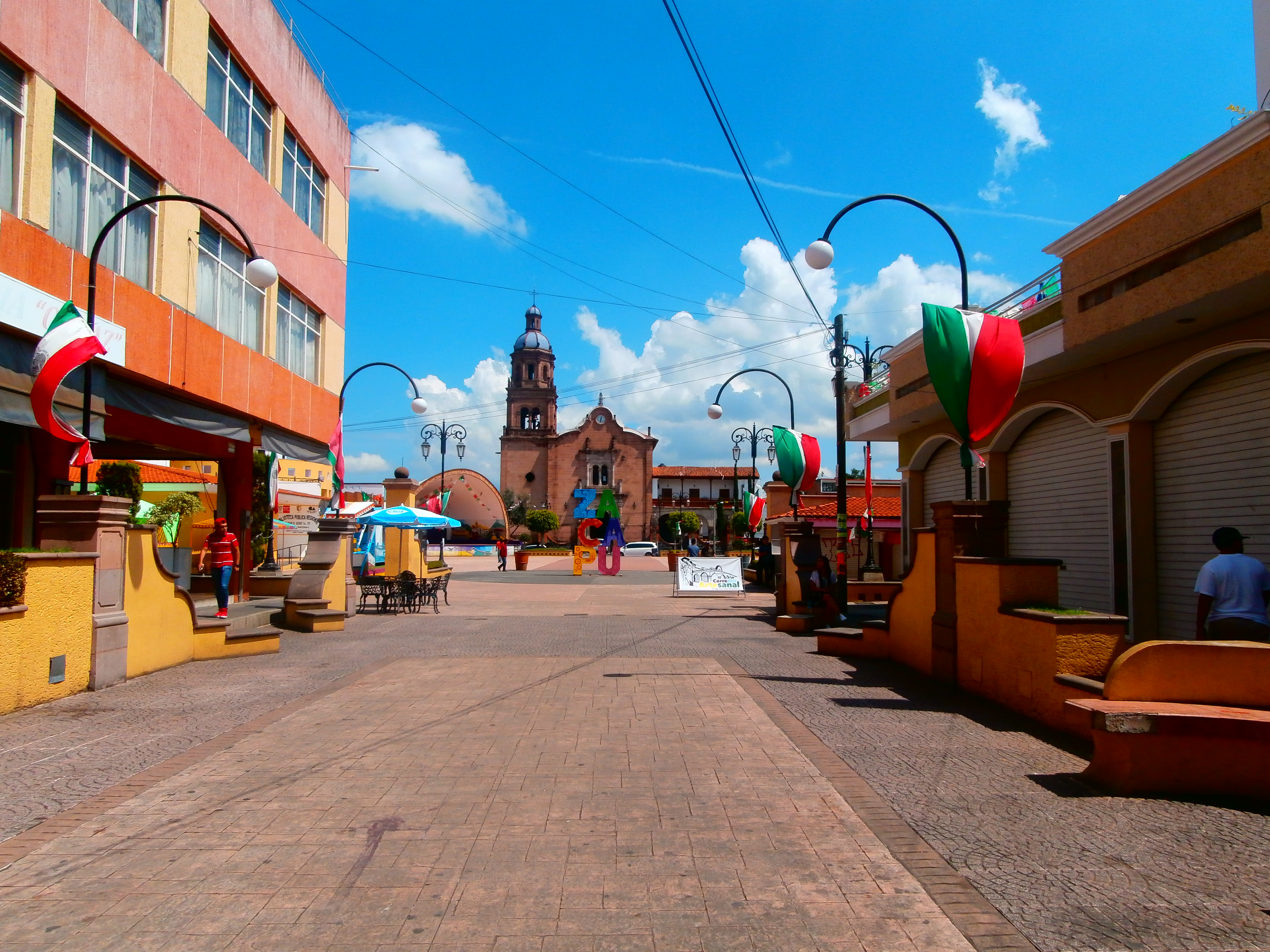
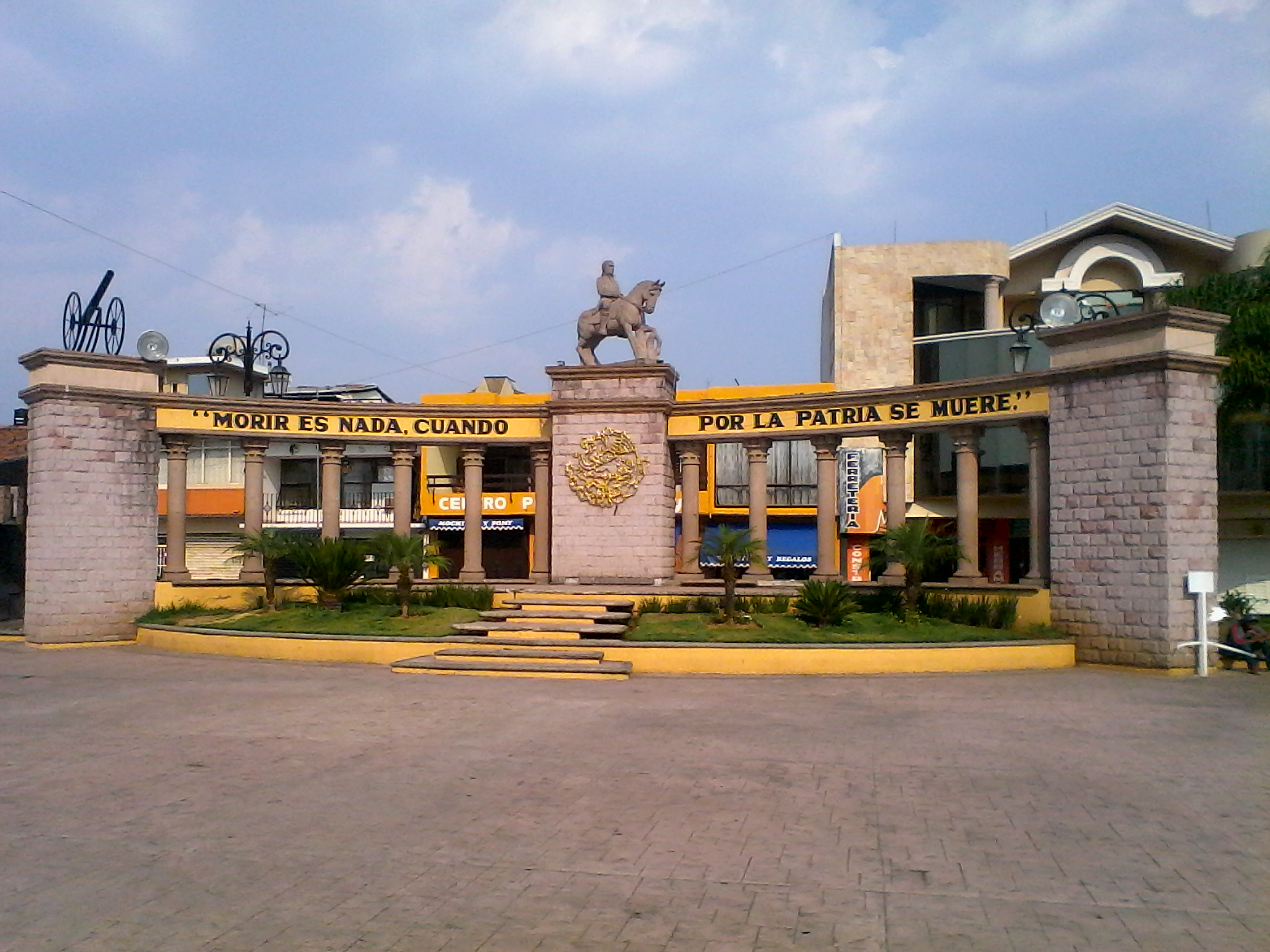
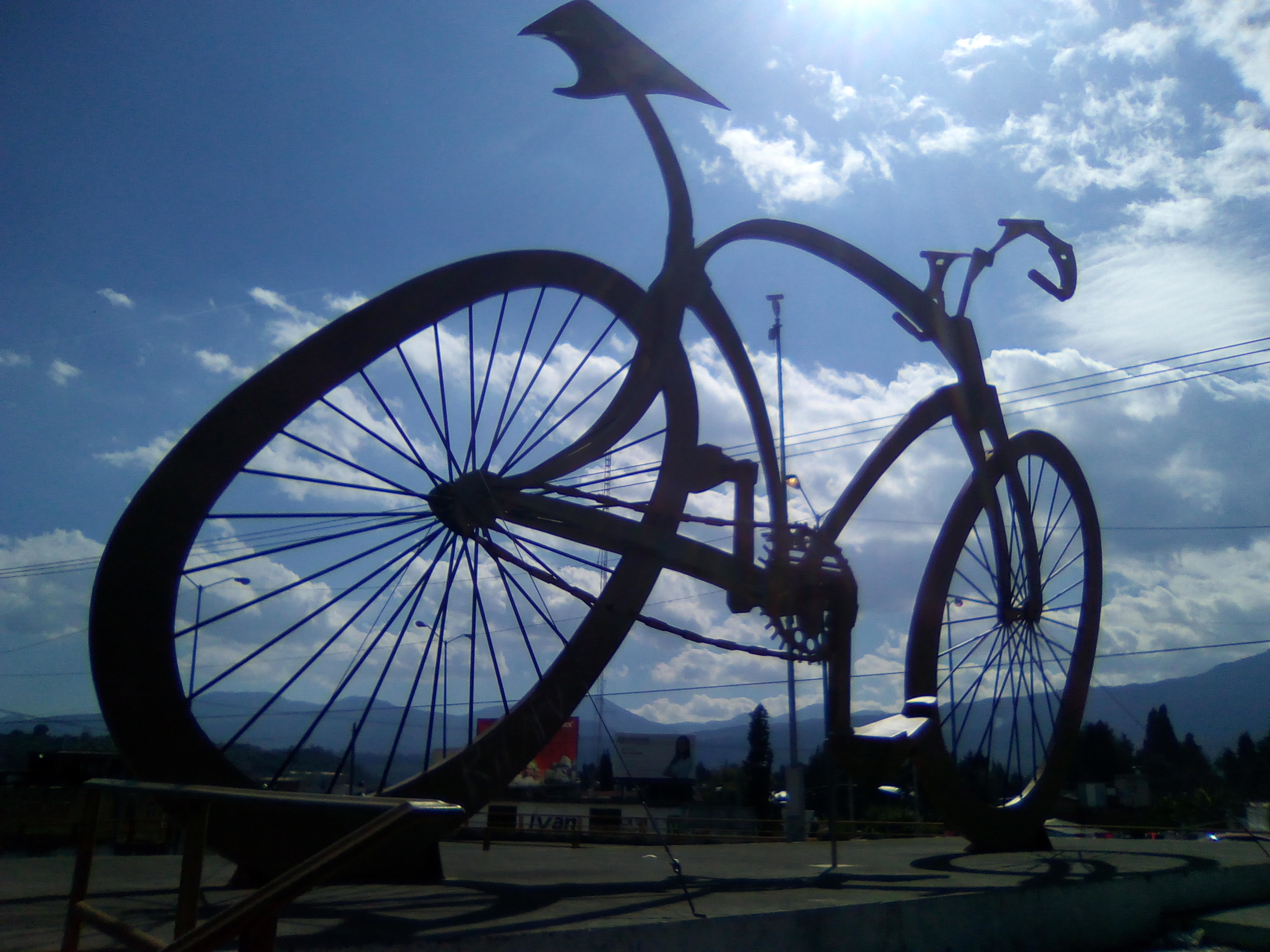
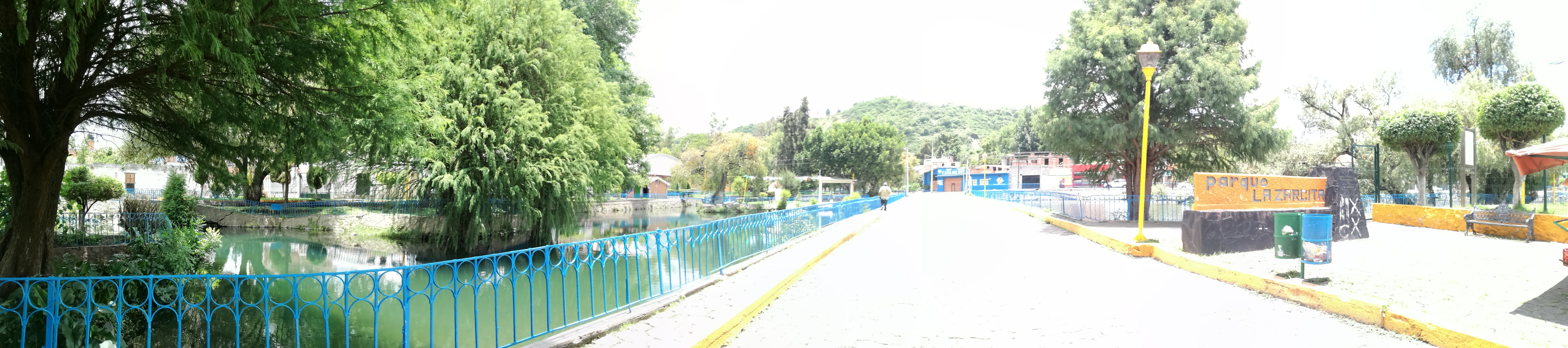
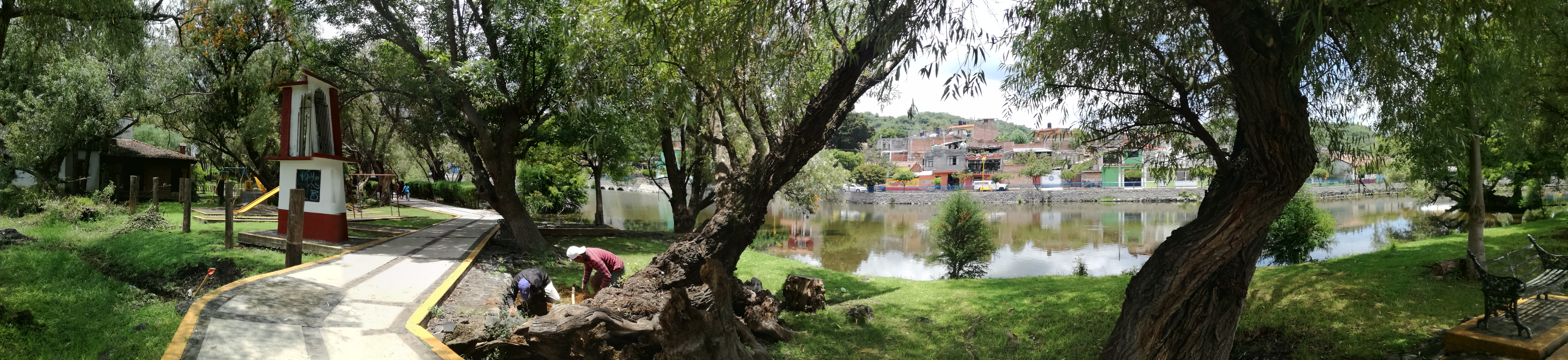
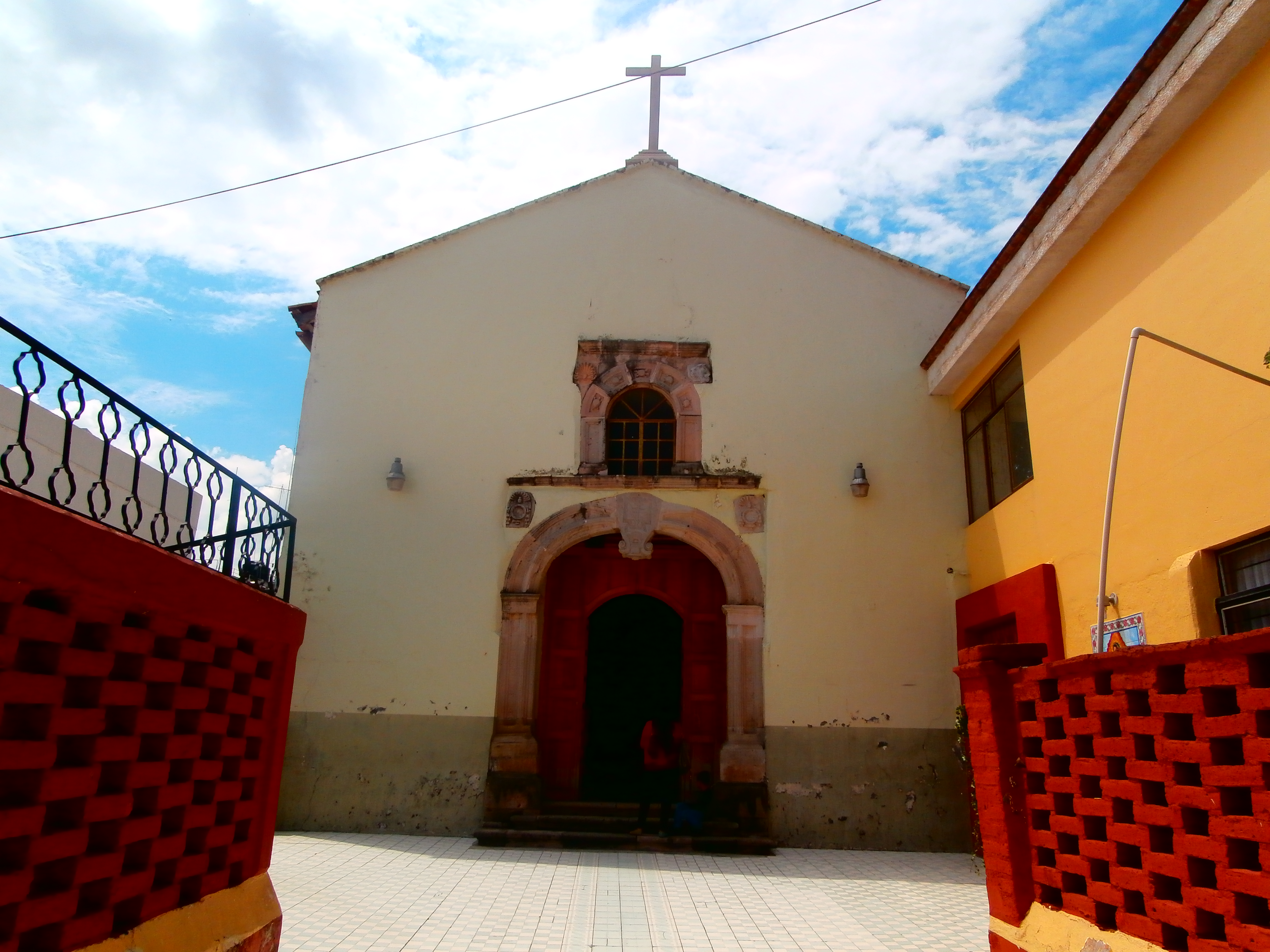
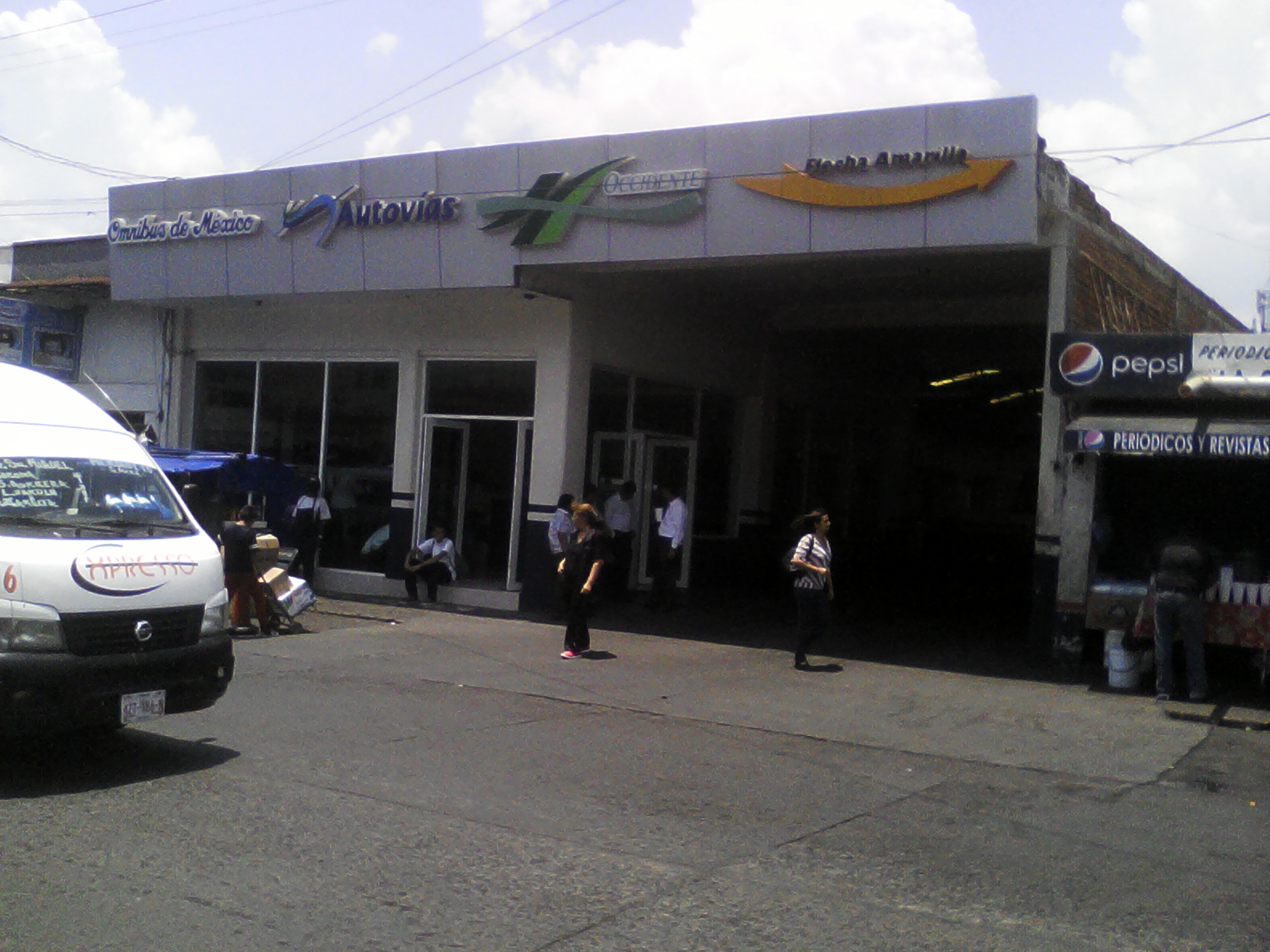
- Convento de Santa Ana and Concha Acústica José María Morelos horse statue World´s biggest bicycle La Zarcita Park La Zarcita Park Virgin of Guadalupe Sanctuary Zacapu Bus Station

- Location within Michoacán Location within Mexico
- Coordinates: 19°49′07″N 101°47′33″W
- Country: Mexico
- State: Michoacán
- Municipality: Zacapu
- Founded: June 29, 1548
- Named for: José María Morelos

Government
  - Municipal President: Mónica Estela Valdez Pulido

Area
  - Total: 6.61 sq mi (17.11 km^{2})
- Elevation: 6,568 ft (2,002 m)

Population (2020)
  - Total: 55,287
  - Density: 8,369/sq mi (3,231/km^{2})
- Time zone: UTC−6 (CST)
- Postal code: 58600
- Area code: 436
- Demonym: Zacapense
- Website: zacapumich.gob.mx

Zacapu (Place of Stones), is a city and the municipal seat of the homonymous municipality. of Michoacán, Mexico. It is located at 19°49′N 101°48′W.

== Demographics ==
The 2010 Mexican census indicated that the city had a population of 52,806 and the municipality a population of 73,455.

== Notable people ==
- José Ángel Aguilar, writer
- Rudy Gutierrez, noted oncologist
- Juan B. Guido, poet
- Fray Jacobo Daciano, Danish Franciscan priest, member of the Tzintzuntzan convent
- Primo Tapia de la Cruz, labor leader who organized farming communities against landholders. He was assassinated in 1926.
- Abel Alcázar Pallares, philanthropist and community activist
- Armando Martínez (cyclist), cyclist
- Rodolfo Vitela, cyclist
- Jorge del Pozzo, businessman
- César Martínez, boxer
- Adolfo García Trujillo, marathonist
- Eugenio Calderón, professional footballer, played for Cruz Azul, Morelia, Irapuato, Tigres and Guadalajara. Retired in 1992.
- Jaime Contreras, artist, designer, welder, semi-professional footballer.
- Hugo Ayala Castro, professional footballer, play for Morelia, Atlas and currently Tigres.
