= Municipalities of Michoacán =

List of municipalities of Mexican state

Map of Mexico with Michoacán highlighted

Michoacán is a state in western Mexico that is divided into 113 municipalities. According to the 2020 INEGI census, it is the ninth most populated state with 4,748,846 inhabitants and the 16th largest by land area spanning 58,598.7 square kilometres (22,625.1 sq mi).

Municipalities in Michoacan are administratively autonomous of the state according to the 115th article of the 1917 Constitution of Mexico. Every three years, citizens elect a municipal president (Spanish: presidente municipal) by a plurality voting system who heads a concurrently elected municipal council (ayuntamiento) responsible for providing all the public services for their constituents. The municipal council consists of a variable number of trustees and councillors (regidores y síndicos). Municipalities are responsible for public services (such as water and sewerage), street lighting, public safety, traffic, and the maintenance of public parks, gardens and cemeteries. They may also assist the state and federal governments in education; emergency fire and medical services; environmental protection; and maintenance of monuments and historical landmarks. Since 1984, they have had the power to collect property taxes and user fees, although more funds are obtained from the state and federal governments than from their own income.

The largest municipality by population is Morelia, with 849,053 residents (17.87% of the state's total), while the smallest is Zináparo with 3,232 residents. The largest municipality by land area is Arteaga which spans 3,434.40 km^{2} (1,326.03 sq mi), and the smallest is Aporo with 58.40 km^{2} (22.55 sq mi). The newest municipality is José Sixto Verduzco, created on January 25, 1974.

== Municipalities ==
Largest municipalities in Michoacán by population

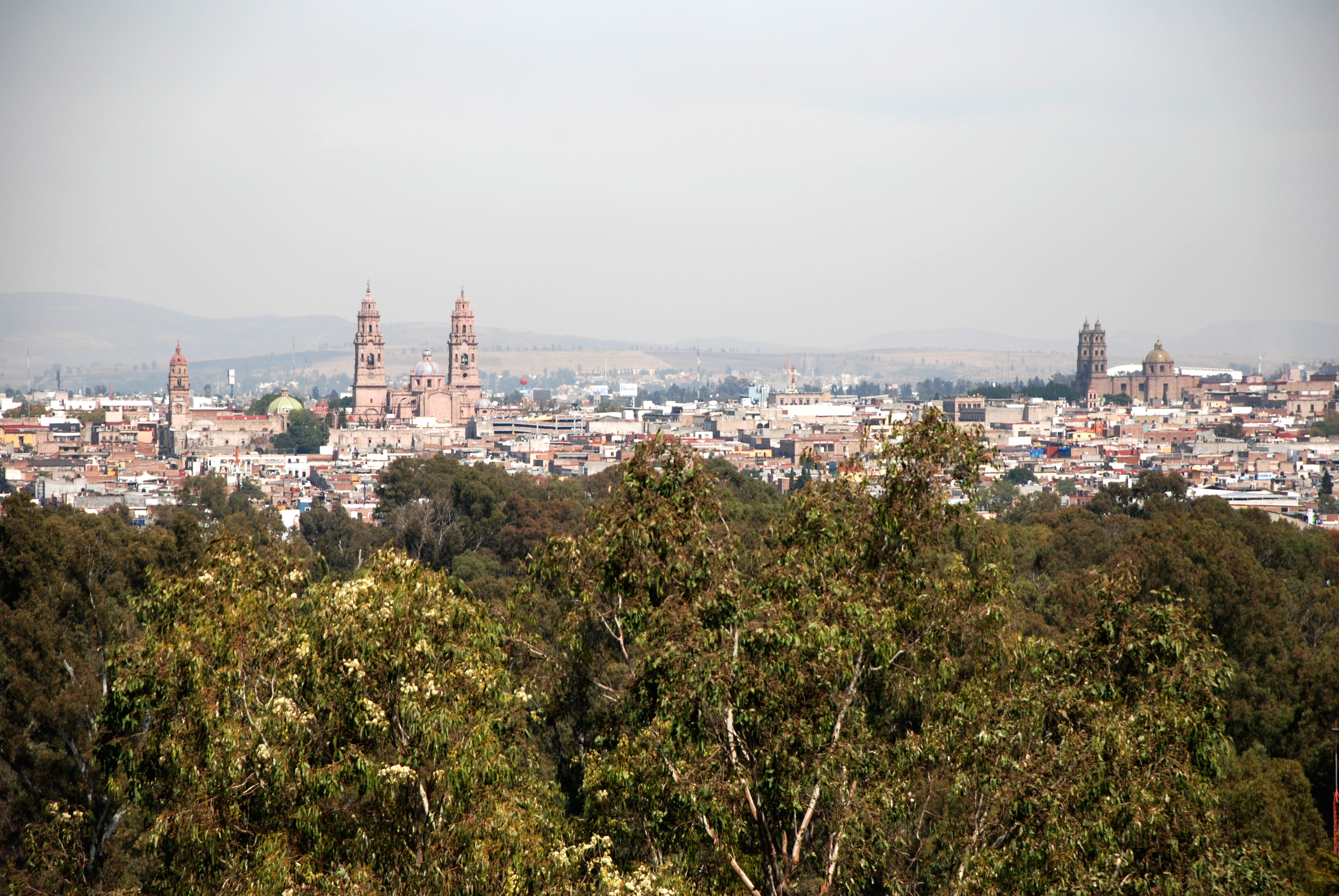
Morelia is the state capital and largest municipality by population in Michoacán.

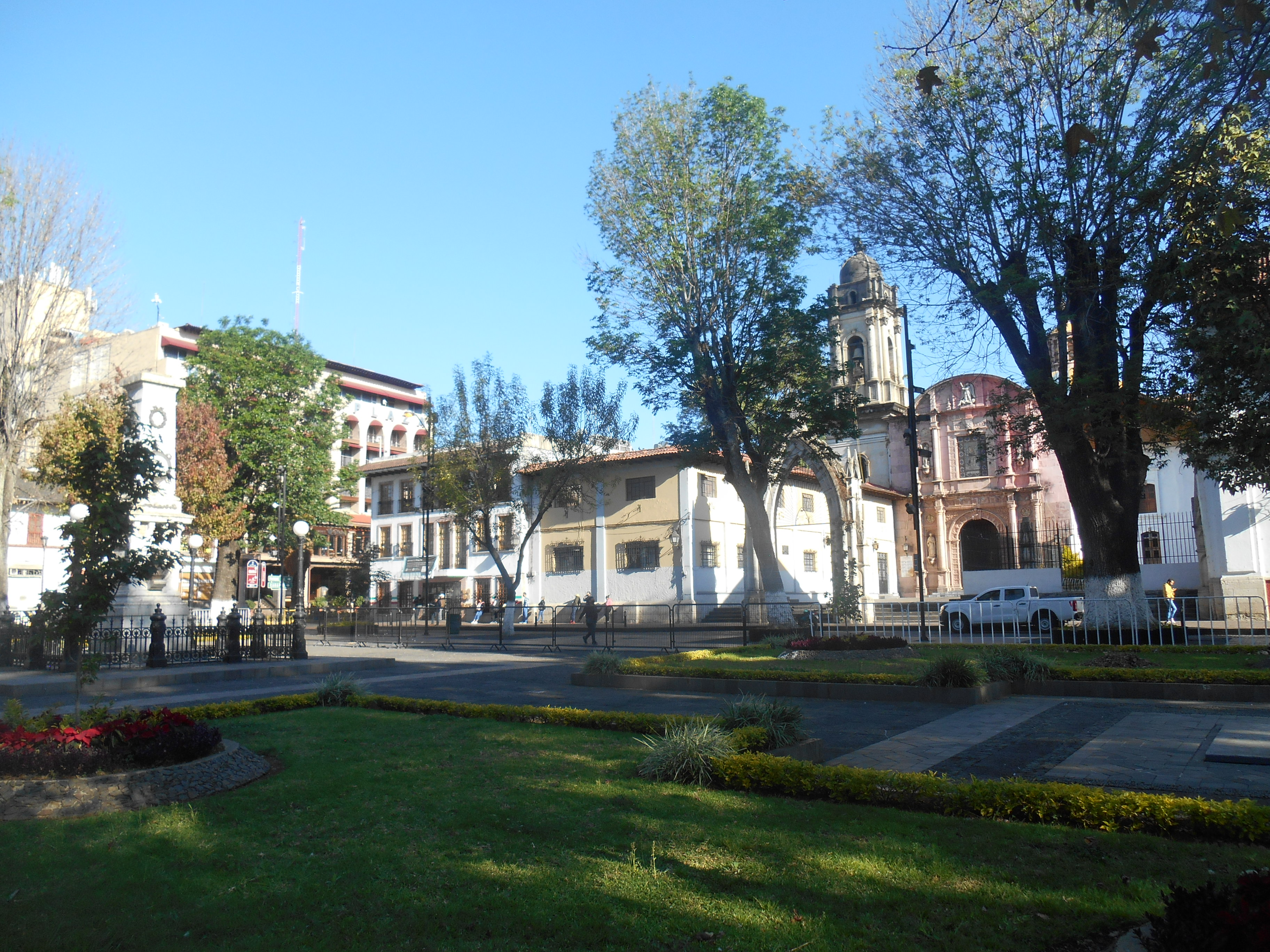
Uruapan is the second largest municipality by population.

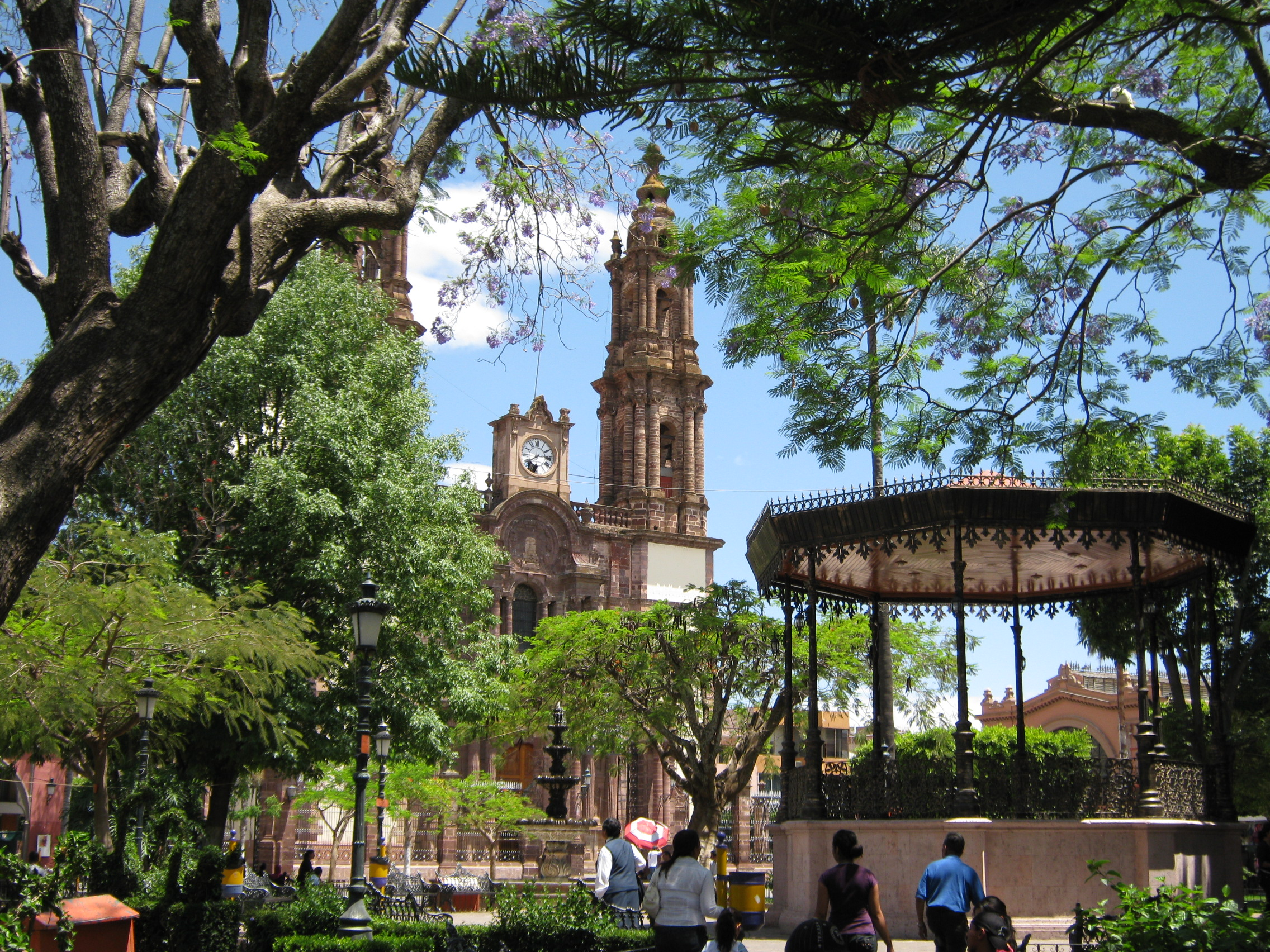
Zamora is the third largest municipality by population.

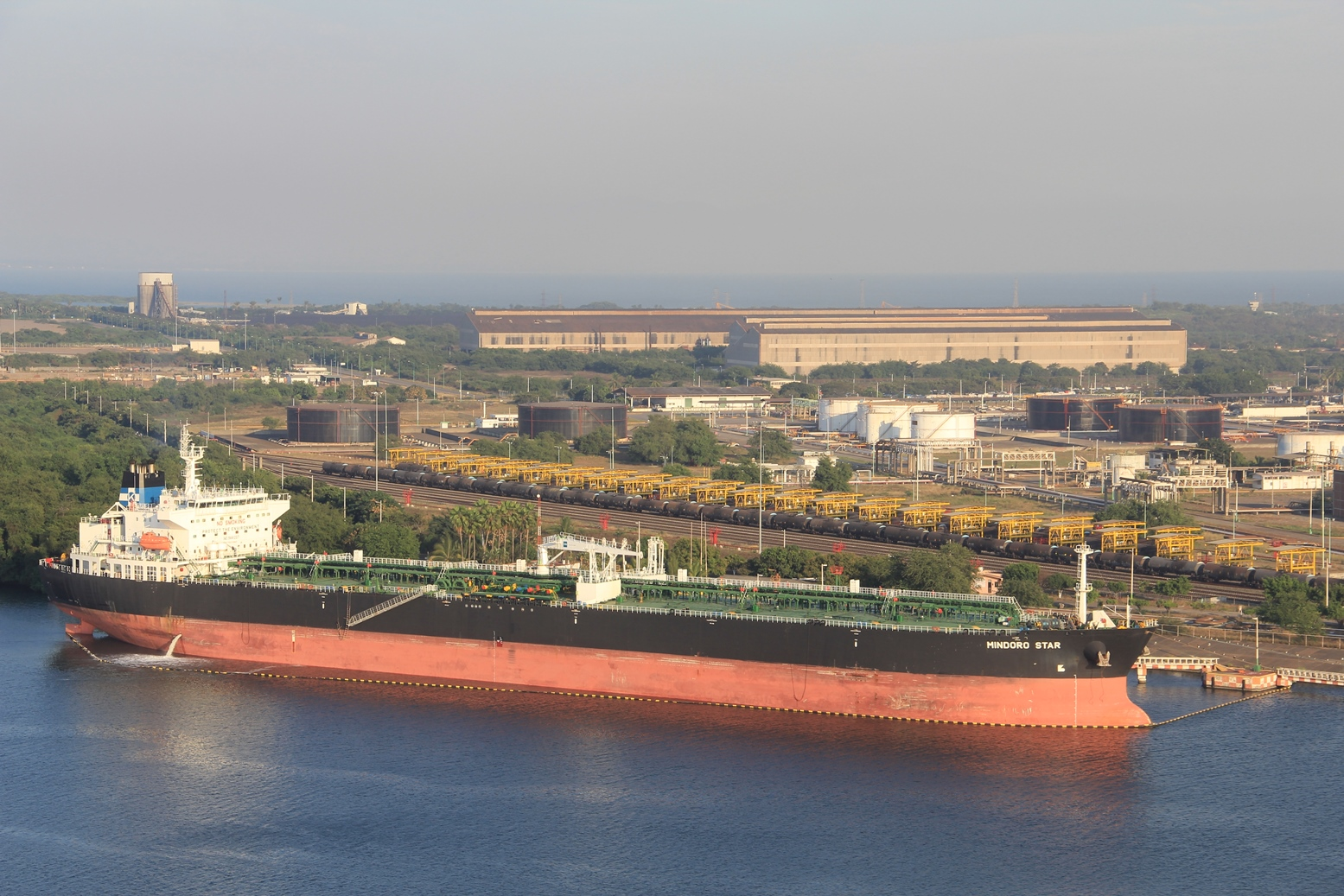
Lázaro Cárdenas is the fourth largest municipality by population.

† State capital

Municipalities of Michoacán
Name	Municipal seat	Population (2020)	Population (2010)	Change	Land area		Population density (2020)	Incorporation date
Name	Municipal seat	Population (2020)	Population (2010)	Change	km^{2}	sq mi	Population density (2020)	Incorporation date
Acuitzio	Acuitzio del Canje	11,301	10,987	+2.9%	176.3	68.1	64.1/km^{2} (166.0/sq mi)	October 10, 1888
Aguililla	Aguililla	14,754	16,214	−9.0%	1,396.9	539.3	10.6/km^{2} (27.4/sq mi)	June 22, 1877
Álvaro Obregón	Álvaro Obregón	23,000	20,913	+10.0%	159.5	61.6	144.2/km^{2} (373.5/sq mi)	April 3, 1930
Angamacutiro	Angamacutiro de la Unión	14,943	14,684	+1.8%	240.3	92.8	62.2/km^{2} (161.1/sq mi)	December 10, 1831
Angangueo	Mineral de Angangueo	10,892	10,768	+1.2%	76.8	29.7	141.8/km^{2} (367.3/sq mi)	December 10, 1831
Apatzingán	Apatzingán de la Constitución	126,191	123,649	+2.1%	1,640.3	633.3	76.9/km^{2} (199.3/sq mi)	March 15, 1825
Aporo	Aporo	3,529	3,218	+9.7%	58.4	22.5	60.4/km^{2} (156.5/sq mi)	September 1, 1921
Aquila	Aquila	24,676	23,536	+4.8%	2,264.2	874.2	10.9/km^{2} (28.2/sq mi)	April 2, 1920
Ario	Ario de Rosales	36,268	34,848	+4.1%	695.2	268.4	52.2/km^{2} (135.1/sq mi)	March 15, 1825
Arteaga (Note: Arteaga was originally incorporated as Carrizal, changing its name on April 2, 1907.)	Arteaga	20,332	21,790	−6.7%	3,434.4	1,326.0	5.9/km^{2} (15.3/sq mi)	September 16, 1894
Briseñas	Briseñas de Matamoros	11,681	10,653	+9.6%	67.7	26.1	172.5/km^{2} (446.9/sq mi)	August 17, 1950
Buenavista	Buenavista Tomatlán	45,538	42,234	+7.8%	922.4	356.1	49.4/km^{2} (127.9/sq mi)	January 1, 1928
Carácuaro	Carácuaro de Morelos	9,176	9,212	−0.4%	918.0	354.4	10.0/km^{2} (25.9/sq mi)	February 1, 1856
Charapan	Charapan	13,539	12,163	+11.3%	233.8	90.3	57.9/km^{2} (150.0/sq mi)	April 23, 1861
Charo	Charo	25,138	21,723	+15.7%	323.0	124.7	77.8/km^{2} (201.6/sq mi)	March 15, 1825
Chavinda (Note: Chavinda was merged with Zamora from 1874 to 79.)	Chavinda	10,417	9,975	+4.4%	152.1	58.7	68.5/km^{2} (177.4/sq mi)	December 10, 1861
Cherán	Cherán	20,586	18,141	+13.5%	222.4	85.9	92.6/km^{2} (239.7/sq mi)	December 10, 1861
Chilchota	Chilchota	40,560	36,293	+11.8%	304.6	117.6	133.2/km^{2} (344.9/sq mi)	December 10, 1831
Chinicuila	Villa Victoria	4,773	5,271	−9.4%	1,022.1	394.6	4.7/km^{2} (12.1/sq mi)	May 5, 1902
Chucándiro (Note: Chucándiro was merged with Copándaro from 1861 to 1862 and with Cuitzeo from 1869 to 1878.)	Chucándiro	4,944	5,166	−4.3%	192.3	74.2	25.7/km^{2} (66.6/sq mi)	December 10, 1831
Churintzio	Churintzio	5,233	5,564	−5.9%	229.4	88.6	22.8/km^{2} (59.1/sq mi)	March 1, 1904
Churumuco	Churumuco de Morelos	12,342	14,366	−14.1%	1,109.0	428.2	11.1/km^{2} (28.8/sq mi)	February 17, 1930
Coahuayana	Coahuayana de Hidalgo	17,022	14,136	+20.4%	366.0	141.3	46.5/km^{2} (120.5/sq mi)	March 15, 1825
Coalcomán	Coalcomán de Vázquez Pallares	19,633	17,615	+11.5%	2,826.3	1,091.2	6.9/km^{2} (18.0/sq mi)	March 12, 1828
Coeneo	Coeneo de la Libertad	20,965	20,492	+2.3%	393.7	152.0	53.3/km^{2} (137.9/sq mi)	December 10, 1831
Cojumatlán (Note: Cojumatlán was originally incorporated as Régules, changing its name on January 1, 1985.)	Cojumatlán de Régules	10,553	9,980	+5.7%	131.1	50.6	80.5/km^{2} (208.5/sq mi)	April 2, 1910
Contepec	Contepec	35,070	32,954	+6.4%	378.9	146.3	92.6/km^{2} (239.7/sq mi)	July 24, 1857
Copándaro	Copándaro de Galeana	9,484	8,952	+5.9%	173.3	66.9	54.7/km^{2} (141.7/sq mi)	December 10, 1861
Cotija	Cotija de la Paz	20,198	19,644	+2.8%	505.0	195.0	40.0/km^{2} (103.6/sq mi)	December 10, 1831
Cuitzeo	Cuitzeo del Porvenir	29,910	28,227	+6.0%	254.4	98.2	117.6/km^{2} (304.5/sq mi)	March 15, 1825
Ecuandureo	Ecuandureo	11,850	12,855	−7.8%	304.2	117.5	39.0/km^{2} (100.9/sq mi)	December 10, 1831
Epitacio Huerta	Epitacio Huerta	16,112	16,218	−0.7%	423.6	163.6	38.0/km^{2} (98.5/sq mi)	March 31, 1962
Erongaricuaro	Erongaricuaro	15,715	14,555	+8.0%	244.0	94.2	64.4/km^{2} (166.8/sq mi)	December 10, 1831
Gabriel Zamora	Lombardía	21,466	21,294	+0.8%	367.3	141.8	58.4/km^{2} (151.4/sq mi)	November 20, 1955
Hidalgo (Note: Hidalgo was originally incorporated as Tajimaroa, changing its name on September 16, 1908.)	Ciudad Hidalgo	125,712	117,620	+6.9%	1,143.4	441.5	109.9/km^{2} (284.8/sq mi)	December 10, 1831
La Huacana	La Huacana	30,627	32,757	−6.5%	1,952.0	753.7	15.7/km^{2} (40.6/sq mi)	December 10, 1861
Huandacareo	Huandacareo	11,644	11,592	+0.4%	96.2	37.1	121.0/km^{2} (313.5/sq mi)	November 18, 1919
Huaniqueo	Huaniqueo de Morales	7,945	7,983	−0.5%	200.5	77.4	39.6/km^{2} (102.6/sq mi)	March 15, 1825
Huetamo	Huetamo de Núñez	41,973	41,937	+0.1%	2,057.3	794.3	20.4/km^{2} (52.8/sq mi)	March 15, 1825
Huiramba	Huiramba	9,015	7,925	+13.8%	79.1	30.5	114.0/km^{2} (295.2/sq mi)	September 24, 1950
Indaparapeo	Indaparapeo	18,385	16,427	+11.9%	176.5	68.1	104.2/km^{2} (269.8/sq mi)	December 10, 1831
Irimbo	Irimbo	16,043	14,766	+8.6%	126.7	48.9	126.6/km^{2} (327.9/sq mi)	December 10, 1831
Ixtlán	Ixtlán de los Hervores	14,302	13,584	+5.3%	123.9	47.8	115.4/km^{2} (299.0/sq mi)	December 10, 1831
Jacona (Note: Jacona was merged with Zamora from 1874 to 1877.)	Jacona de Plancarte	68,781	64,011	+7.5%	118.7	45.8	579.5/km^{2} (1,500.8/sq mi)	December 10, 1831
Jiménez	Villa Jiménez	12,946	13,275	−2.5%	194.5	75.1	66.6/km^{2} (172.4/sq mi)	May 1, 1921
Jiquilpan	Jiquilpan de Juárez	36,158	34,199	+5.7%	243.2	93.9	148.7/km^{2} (385.1/sq mi)	March 15, 1825
José Sixto Verduzco	Pastor Ortiz	26,213	25,576	+2.5%	219.7	84.8	119.3/km^{2} (309.0/sq mi)	January 25, 1974
Juárez	Benito Juárez	14,936	13,604	+9.8%	141.0	54.4	105.9/km^{2} (274.4/sq mi)	June 29, 1939
Jungapeo	Jungapeo de Juárez	19,834	19,986	−0.8%	265.5	102.5	74.7/km^{2} (193.5/sq mi)	June 12, 1863
Lagunillas	Lagunillas	5,745	5,506	+4.3%	72.7	28.1	79.0/km^{2} (204.7/sq mi)	September 21, 1950
La Piedad	La Piedad de Cabadas	106,490	99,576	+6.9%	284.7	109.9	374.0/km^{2} (968.8/sq mi)	March 15, 1825
Lázaro Cárdenas (Note: Lázaro Cárdenas was originally incorporated as Melchor Ocampo del Balsas, changing its name on November 20, 1970.)	Lázaro Cárdenas	196,003	178,817	+9.6%	1,150.3	444.1	170.4/km^{2} (441.3/sq mi)	May 27, 1947
Los Reyes	Los Reyes de Salgado	78,935	64,141	+23.1%	480.9	185.7	164.1/km^{2} (425.1/sq mi)	December 10, 1831
Madero	Villa Madero	19,086	17,427	+9.5%	1,019.6	393.7	18.7/km^{2} (48.5/sq mi)	October 18, 1914
Maravatío	Maravatío de Ocampo	89,311	80,258	+11.3%	697.7	269.4	128.0/km^{2} (331.5/sq mi)	December 10, 1831
Marcos Castellanos	San José de Gracia	13,983	13,031	+7.3%	233.0	90.0	60.0/km^{2} (155.4/sq mi)	August 9, 1968
Morelia (Note: Morelia was originally incorporated as Valladolid, changing its name on September 12, 1828.)	Morelia†	849,053	729,279	+16.4%	1,192.4	460.4	712.1/km^{2} (1,844.2/sq mi)	March 15, 1825
Morelos (Note: Morelos was originally incorporated as Huango, changing its name on May 5, 1902.)	Villa Morelos	7,983	8,091	−1.3%	183.4	70.8	43.5/km^{2} (112.7/sq mi)	December 10, 1831
Múgica (Note: Múgica was originally incorporated as Zaragoza, changing its name on December 18, 1969.)	Nueva Italia	45,732	44,963	+1.7%	377.6	145.8	121.1/km^{2} (313.7/sq mi)	March 22, 1942
Nahuatzen	Nahuatzen	32,598	27,174	+20.0%	304.2	117.5	107.2/km^{2} (277.5/sq mi)	December 10, 1831
Nocupétaro	Nocupétaro de Morelos	8,196	7,799	+5.1%	545.5	210.6	15.0/km^{2} (38.9/sq mi)	April 2, 1910
Nuevo Parangaricutiro (Note: Nuevo Parangaricutiro was originally incorporated as Parangaricutiro, changing its name on August 27, 1950. It was merged with Uruapan from 1856 to 1861, 1902 to 04 and 1944 to 1950.)	Nuevo San Juan Parangaricutiro	20,981	18,834	+11.4%	235.0	90.7	89.3/km^{2} (231.2/sq mi)	December 10, 1831
Nuevo Urecho (Note: Nuevo Urecho was originally incorporated as Urecho, changing its name on February 1, 1856.)	Nuevo Urecho	9,027	8,240	+9.6%	330.4	127.6	27.3/km^{2} (70.8/sq mi)	July 1, 1839
Numarán	Numarán	9,437	9,599	−1.7%	76.9	29.7	122.7/km^{2} (317.8/sq mi)	April 24, 1868
Ocampo	Ocampo	24,774	22,628	+9.5%	142.3	54.9	174.1/km^{2} (450.9/sq mi)	January 17, 1930
Pajacuarán	Pajacuarán	21,028	19,450	+8.1%	170.4	65.8	123.4/km^{2} (319.6/sq mi)	January 1, 1923
Panindicuaro	Panindicuaro	14,889	16,064	−7.3%	289.3	111.7	51.5/km^{2} (133.3/sq mi)	December 10, 1831
Paracho	Paracho de Verduzco	39,657	34,721	+14.2%	244.2	94.3	162.4/km^{2} (420.6/sq mi)	March 15, 1825
Parácuaro	Parácuaro	26,832	25,343	+5.9%	503.4	194.4	53.3/km^{2} (138.1/sq mi)	December 10, 1861
Pátzcuaro	Pátzcuaro	98,382	87,794	+12.1%	438.5	169.3	224.4/km^{2} (581.1/sq mi)	March 15, 1825
Penjamillo	Penjamillo de Degollado	16,621	17,159	−3.1%	371.2	143.3	44.8/km^{2} (116.0/sq mi)	December 10, 1831
Peribán (Note: Peribán was originally incorporated as San Juan Perivan, changing its name on January 18, 1862.)	Peribán de Ramos	29,389	25,296	+16.2%	331.8	128.1	88.6/km^{2} (229.4/sq mi)	December 10, 1861
Purépero	Purépero de Echáiz	15,503	15,306	+1.3%	192.7	74.4	80.5/km^{2} (208.4/sq mi)	December 10, 1831
Puruándiro	Puruándiro	69,260	67,837	+2.1%	718.9	277.6	96.3/km^{2} (249.5/sq mi)	March 15, 1825
Queréndaro	Queréndaro	13,961	13,550	+3.0%	234.9	90.7	59.4/km^{2} (153.9/sq mi)	September 1, 1921
Quiroga (Note: Quiroga was originally incorporated as Cocupao, changing its name on September 6, 1852.)	Quiroga	27,176	25,592	+6.2%	213.4	82.4	127.3/km^{2} (329.8/sq mi)	December 10, 1831
Sahuayo	Sahuayo de Morelos	78,477	72,841	+7.7%	128.1	49.5	612.6/km^{2} (1,586.7/sq mi)	December 10, 1831
Salvador Escalante (Note: Salvador Escalante was originally incorporated as Santa Clara, changing its name on February 5, 1981.)	Santa Clara del Cobre	49,896	45,217	+10.3%	487.9	188.4	102.3/km^{2} (264.9/sq mi)	December 10, 1831
San Lucas	San Lucas	17,677	18,461	−4.2%	467.9	180.7	37.8/km^{2} (97.8/sq mi)	January 13, 1925
Santa Ana Maya	Santa Ana Maya	12,812	12,618	+1.5%	104.1	40.2	123.1/km^{2} (318.8/sq mi)	April 24, 1868
Senguio	Senguio	19,833	18,427	+7.6%	250.3	96.6	79.2/km^{2} (205.2/sq mi)	April 26, 1856
Susupuato	Susupuato de Guerrer	9,076	8,704	+4.3%	268.0	103.5	33.9/km^{2} (87.7/sq mi)	December 10, 1831
Tacámbaro	Tacámbaro de Codallos	79,540	69,955	+13.7%	786.8	303.8	101.1/km^{2} (261.8/sq mi)	March 15, 1825
Tancítaro	Tancítaro	33,453	29,414	+13.7%	714.3	275.8	46.8/km^{2} (121.3/sq mi)	December 10, 1831
Tangamandapio	Tangamandapio	31,716	27,822	+14.0%	316.1	122.0	100.3/km^{2} (259.9/sq mi)	December 10, 1831
Tangancícuaro	Tangancícuaro de Arista	35,256	32,677	+7.9%	385.1	148.7	91.6/km^{2} (237.1/sq mi)	December 10, 1831
Tanhuato	Tanhuato de Guerrero	15,534	15,176	+2.4%	228.1	88.1	68.1/km^{2} (176.4/sq mi)	December 10, 1831
Taretan	Taretan	15,589	13,558	+15.0%	185.1	71.5	84.2/km^{2} (218.1/sq mi)	March 15, 1825
Tarímbaro	Tarímbaro	114,513	78,623	+45.6%	255.7	98.7	447.8/km^{2} (1,159.9/sq mi)	December 10, 1831
Tepalcatepec	Tepalcatepec	24,074	22,987	+4.7%	798.1	308.1	30.2/km^{2} (78.1/sq mi)	June 22, 1877
Tingambato	Tingambato	16,325	13,950	+17.0%	189.8	73.3	86.0/km^{2} (222.8/sq mi)	June 22, 1877
Tingüindín	Tingüindín	14,934	13,511	+10.5%	172.8	66.7	86.4/km^{2} (223.8/sq mi)	December 10, 1831
Tiquicheo de Nicolás Romero	Tiquicheo	12,836	14,274	−10.1%	1,493.0	576.5	8.6/km^{2} (22.3/sq mi)	April 2, 1907
Tlalpujahua	Tlalpujahua de Rayón	28,556	27,587	+3.5%	197.2	76.1	144.8/km^{2} (375.0/sq mi)	March 15, 1825
Tlazazalca (Note: Tlazazalca was merged with Purépero from 1874 to 1879.)	Tlazazalca	6,420	6,890	−6.8%	203.8	78.7	31.5/km^{2} (81.6/sq mi)	March 15, 1825
Tocumbo	Tocumbo	12,325	11,504	+7.1%	506.0	195.4	24.4/km^{2} (63.1/sq mi)	February 27, 1930
Tumbiscatío	Tumbiscatío de Ruiz	5,971	7,890	−24.3%	2,062.6	796.4	2.9/km^{2} (7.5/sq mi)	May 12, 1955
Turicato	Turicato	29,056	31,877	−8.8%	1,546.1	597.0	18.8/km^{2} (48.7/sq mi)	December 10, 1831
Tuxpan	Tuxpan	25,757	26,026	−1.0%	243.4	94.0	105.8/km^{2} (274.1/sq mi)	December 10, 1831
Tuzantla	Tuzantla	14,329	16,305	−12.1%	1,018.1	393.1	14.1/km^{2} (36.5/sq mi)	December 10, 1831
Tzintzuntzan (Note: Tzintzuntzan was originally incorporated as Zinzunzán, changing its name on February 1, 1856. It was merged with Quiroga from 1874 to 1930.)	Tzintzuntzan	14,911	13,556	+10.0%	184.4	71.2	80.9/km^{2} (209.4/sq mi)	December 10, 1831
Tzitzio	Tzitzio	8,855	9,166	−3.4%	941.3	363.4	9.4/km^{2} (24.4/sq mi)	April 6, 1936
Uruapan	Uruapan	356,786	315,350	+13.1%	1,012.9	391.1	352.2/km^{2} (912.3/sq mi)	March 15, 1825
Venustiano Carranza	Venustiano Carranza	23,469	23,457	+0.1%	227.6	87.9	103.1/km^{2} (267.1/sq mi)	January 21, 1935
Villamar (Note: Villamar was originally incorporated as Guarachita, changing its name on September 20, 1934.)	Villamar	15,864	16,991	−6.6%	350.2	135.2	45.3/km^{2} (117.3/sq mi)	December 10, 1831
Vista Hermosa	Vista Hermosa de Negrete	20,982	18,995	+10.5%	147.6	57.0	142.2/km^{2} (368.2/sq mi)	December 1, 1921
Yurécuaro	Yurécuaro	32,303	29,995	+7.7%	174.4	67.3	185.2/km^{2} (479.7/sq mi)	December 10, 1831
Zacapu (Note: Zacapu was merged with Pátzcuaro from 1884 to 1889.)	Zacapu	76,829	73,455	+4.6%	454.7	175.6	169.0/km^{2} (437.6/sq mi)	December 10, 1831
Zamora	Zamora de Hidalgo	204,860	186,102	+10.1%	335.0	129.3	611.5/km^{2} (1,583.8/sq mi)	March 15, 1825
Zináparo	Zináparo	3,232	3,247	−0.5%	113.2	43.7	28.6/km^{2} (73.9/sq mi)	June 12, 1863
Zinapécuaro	Zinapécuaro de Figueroa	49,005	46,666	+5.0%	596.4	230.3	82.2/km^{2} (212.8/sq mi)	March 15, 1825
Ziracuaretiro	Ziracuaretiro	18,402	15,222	+20.9%	160.0	61.8	115.0/km^{2} (297.9/sq mi)	May 1, 1922
Zitácuaro	Zitácuaro	157,056	155,534	+1.0%	512.6	197.9	306.4/km^{2} (793.5/sq mi)	March 15, 1825
Michoacán	—	4,748,846	4,351,037	+9.1%	58,598.7	22,625.1	81.0/km^{2} (209.9/sq mi)	—
Mexico	—	126,014,024	112,336,538	+12.2%	1,960,646.7	757,010	64.3/km^{2} (166.5/sq mi)	—
