= Coalcomán de Vázquez Pallares =

Municipality in Michoacán, Mexico

Coordinates: 18°47′N 103°10′W

Municipio de Coalcomán de Vázquez Pallares
- Municipality
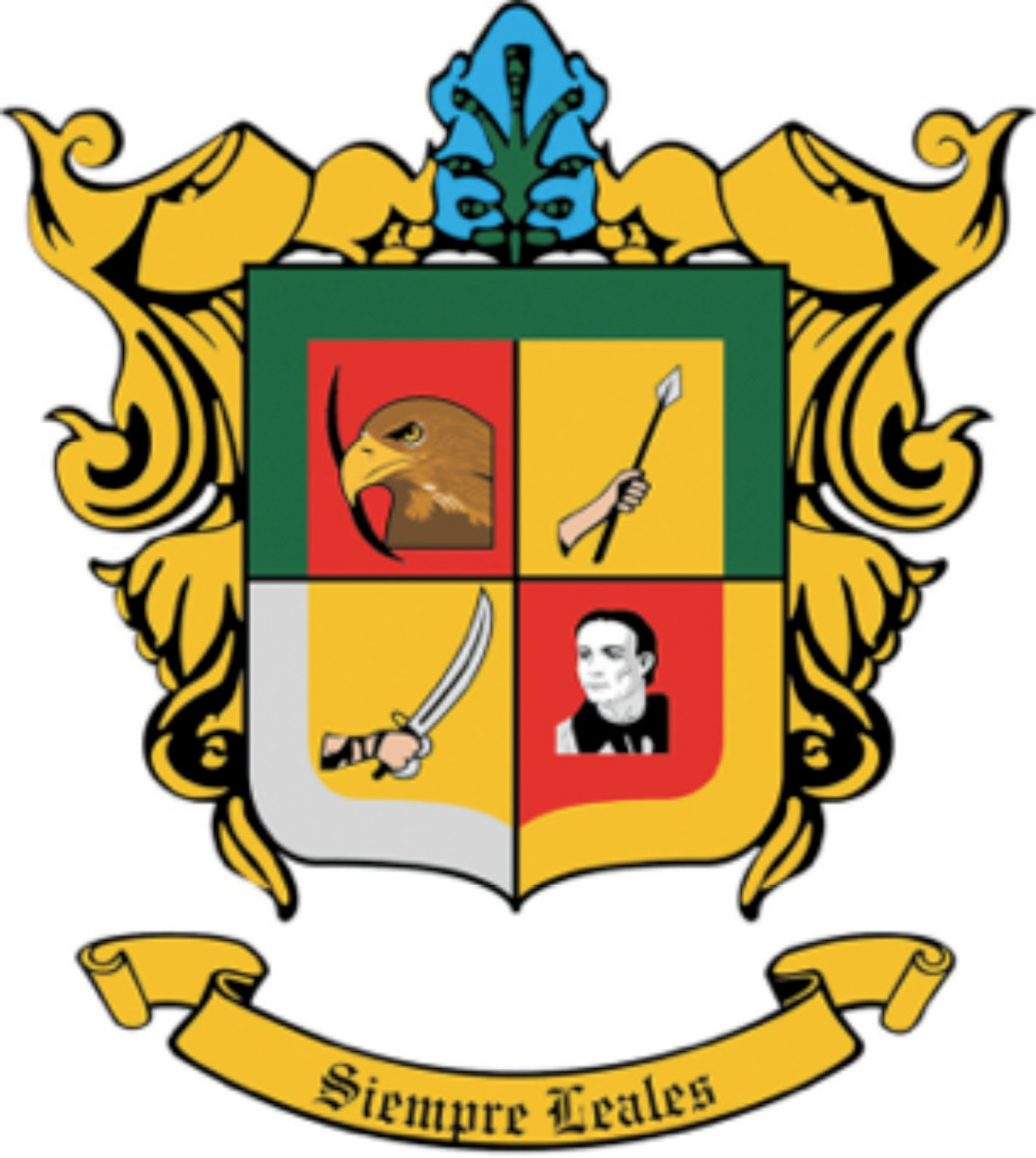
- Coat of arms
- Interactive map of Municipio de Coalcomán de Vázquez Pallares
- Country: Mexico
- State: Michoacán

Population (2005)
  - Total: 18,156

Coalcomán de Vázquez Pallares is a municipality located in the Sierra Madre del Sur mountain range, in the southwest region of the state of Michoacán in central-western Mexico.

The municipality has an area of 2,881.57 square kilometres (4.89% of the surface of the state) and is bordered to the north by the state of Jalisco and the municipality of Tepalcatepec, to the east by Arteaga and Aguililla, to the south by Aquila, and to the west by Chinicuila. The municipality had a population of 18,156 inhabitants according to the 2005 census. Its municipal seat is the city of the same name.

Coalcomán is a word of Nahuatl origin that means "Snake" or "Snake with Hands", according to some authors.

== See also ==
- Coalcomán River
- Sierra Madre del Sur topics
- Municipalities of Michoacán
