= Buenavista, Michoacán =

Buenavista Municipality
- Municipality

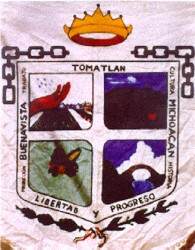
- Coat of arms

- Location of Buenavista in Mexico Buenavista Municipality (Mexico)
- Coordinates: 19°13′N 102°35′W
- Country: Mexico
- State: Michoacán
- Established: 1927
- Municipal seat: Buenavista Tomatlán

Government
  - Municipal president: Lorenzo Barajas Heredia (PRD-PANAL)

Area
  - Total: 922.15 km^{2} (356.04 sq mi)
- Elevation: 450 m (1,480 ft)

Population (2020)
  - Total: 45,538
  - Density: 49.382/km^{2} (127.90/sq mi)
- Time zone: UTC-6 (CST)

Buenavista is a municipality in the Mexican state of Michoacán.

== Political entity ==
The municipality is located in the state of Michoacán de Ocampo, in western Mexico, 233 kilometres (145 mi) from the state capital of Morelia. It has a territory of 922.15 square kilometres (356.04 mi^{2}), bordering the municipalities of Peribán, Tancítaro, Apatzingán, Aguililla and Tepalcatepec, with the state of Jalisco to the west.

In 2020, the municipality had a total population of 45,538 residents. Of these, 23,007 were male (50.5%) and 22,531 were female (49.5%).

The seat is Buenavista Tomatlán, with a population of about 8,500 people. This seat serves as the local government for the entire territory, with a municipal president, a syndic, and 7 representatives called regidors. Other principal communities include Carillo Puerto, Santa Ana Amatlán, Pizándaro and 18 de Marzo. The main economic activities of the municipalities are farming and ranching.

== Geography ==
It has an average altitude of 450 metres (1,480 ft) above sea level, being on the foothills of the Trans-Mexican Volcanic Belt and the valley formed by the Tepalcatepec River. Notable elevations include the hills called Zirapatiro, Del Azucar, Felipe Catlan, Los Osotes and Polon. This river accounts for most of the municipality's surface water, with the rest provided by springs and streams.

=== Climate ===
The climate is tropical with temperatures that range between 18 and 36 degrees C. It is relatively dry, with rains in the summer. Annual average rainfall is 745.2mm.

=== Flora and fauna ===
The ecosystem is dominated by tropical deciduous forest, with species such as pine and oak in the higher elevations along with kapok, parota, tepeguaje, mango and zapote (Diospyros digyna and Casimiroa edulis). There are also areas of tropical spiny brush. Typical fauna includes species such as cacomistle, skunks, squirrels, coyotes, foxes, Eurasian sparrowhawk, doves and other birds.

== History ==
The name means "good view" in Spanish. Its original name was Tomatlán Buenavista, with the first name from Nahuatl meaning "place of tomatoes". The area was first formally settled by the Mexicas during the pre Hispanic period, but its population was mixed with those of the Purhepecha and Pirinda ethnicities. This community was located just north of the current municipal seat, which is now an archeological site at a ranch called Pueblo Viejo. After the Spanish Conquest, the location of the current town of Buenavista began as a hacienda. After Independence, it came under the control of the municipality of Apatzingán. The current municipality was formed in 1927, taking land from the municipalities of Apatzingán and Tancítaro, with the seat named Buenavista Tomatlán.

== People ==
- María Guadalupe López Esquivel - member of the Jalisco New Generation Cartel
