= Las Jilguerillas =

Mexican ranchera duo

- Origin: Cañada de Ramírez, Michoacán, Mexico
- Genres: Ranchera
- Years active: 1955–2021
- Label: COSMOS Records
- Past members: María Amparo Higuera; Imelda Higuera; Mercedes Castro

Las Jilguerillas was a Mexican ranchera duo that was formed in the mid-1950s by sisters Imelda and María Amparo Higuera.

The municipal president of Numarán considers them icons of ranchera music, and they have had several successful tours in both Mexico and the United States. They have also appeared in several Mexican films.

== History ==
=== Early years ===
Sisters Imelda and María Amparo Higuera started singing together as children and were discovered by another Mexican sibling duo, Dueto América, in the 1950s. They released their first official single, Chaparrita Consentida, on 5 July 1955. Almost immediately, they became a huge success, selling records both in their country and among the Hispanic population in the United States.

=== Later years ===
Their records were first arranged and produced by Gilberto Parra, and later by Cornelio Reyna, and accompanied instrumentally by various Mexican musicians. After the death of Imelda on 20 July 2004, María Amparo continued to perform until she was joined by Mercedes Castro in 2007.

The group has won many awards throughout its career, including the Eréndira State Prize of the Arts in 2017. In 2018, the municipality of Numarán erected a commemorative plaque at their childhood home in Cañada de Ramírez at a ceremony attended by María Amparo.

In 2021, María Amparo Higuera died due to cardiac arrest and the group was therefore disbanded.

== Discography ==
=== Albums ===
- Las Jilguerillas (1972)
- Alegres De Terán (1973)
- De Rancho En Rancho (1975)
- Ecos Del Campo (1975)
- Por Las Campiñas (1978)
- El Descalzo (1979)
- El Ingrato (1980)
- 15 Autenticos Exitos (1983)
- Anda Paloma Y Dile Y Mas Exitos (1984)

=== Singles ===
- Chaparrita Consentida (1955)
- Ni Frio, Ni Sueno (1956)
- Vivo Esperando (1956)
- El Sube Y Baja (1956)
- Ojitos Encantadores (1966)
- Amor Y Lagrimas (1966)
- Con Treinta Punales (1966)
- Busca Otro Amor (1968)
- Llorare Tu Ausencia (1969)
- En Las Cantinas (1969)
- La Recien Casada (1970)
- El Bandolero (1970)
- Cumpleaños (1970)
- El Ultimo Adios (1971)
- Con Que Me Pagas (1971)
- Hay Un Ser (1972)
- Que Lejos Ando (1972)
- Con Que Me Pagas (1973)
- Corrido de Nicolasa (1973)
- Anda Paloma y Dile (1973)
- El Novillo Despuntado (1974)
- De Mi Rancho A Tu Rancho (1975)
- De Rancho En Rancho (1976)
- Noche Tenebrosa (1976)
- Hasta Parece De Dia (1976)
- Por Ninguin Motivo (1977)
- El Bato Gacho (1977)
- El Ingrato (1979)
- La Entadallita (1979)
- Amaneciendo (1979)
- El Bracero Fracasado (1981)
- Concha La Mojada (1982)
- Anda Paloma y Dile (1984)
- Calla Mujer Calla (1985)
- Largas Se Me Hacen Las Horas (1984)
- Carino Sin Esperanza (1985)
