= Chinicuila =

Municipality in Michoacán, Mexico

Coordinates: 18°45′N 103°22′W

- Municipality
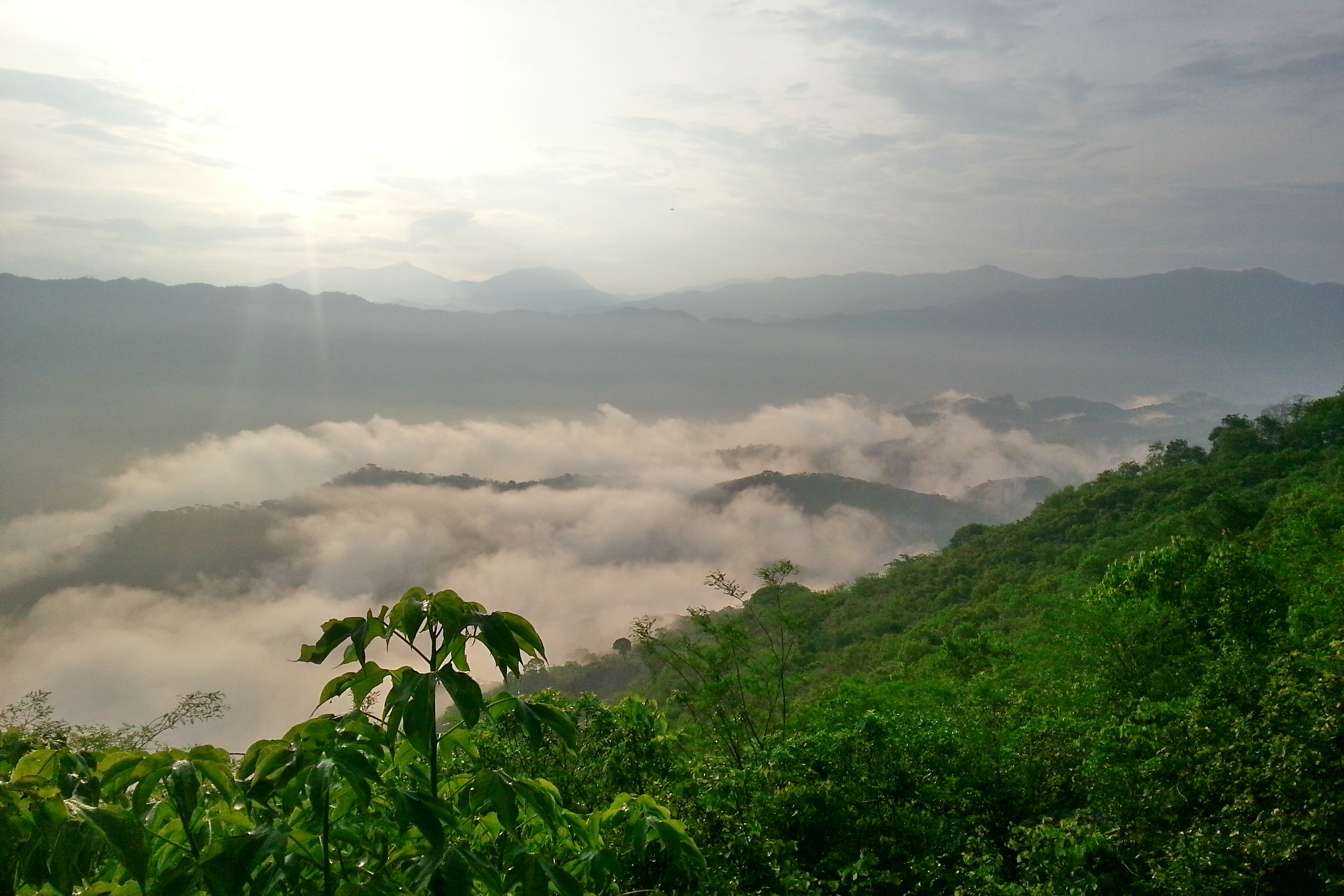

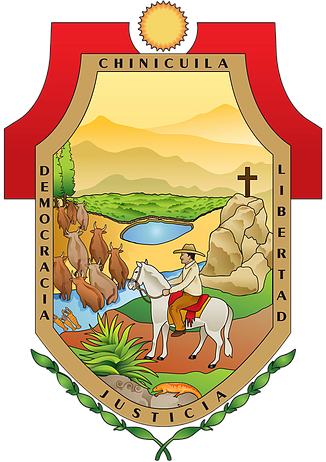
- Coat of arms

- Location in Mexico Chinicuila (Mexico)
- Country: Mexico
- State: Michoacán
- Demonym: (in Spanish)
- Time zone: UTC−6 (CST)

Chinicuila is a municipality located in the southwestern region of the Mexican state of Michoacán. The municipality has an area of 928.64 square kilometres (1.35% of the surface of the state) and is bordered to the north by the state of Jalisco, to the east by Coalcomán, to the south by Aquila, and to the west by Coahuayana and the state of Colima. The municipality had a population of 5,343 inhabitants according to the 2005 census. Its municipal seat is the city of Villa Victoria (formerly known as Chinicuila del Oro).

== See also ==
- Municipalities of Michoacán
