= Tzintzuntzan Municipality =

Tzintzuntzán
- Municipality
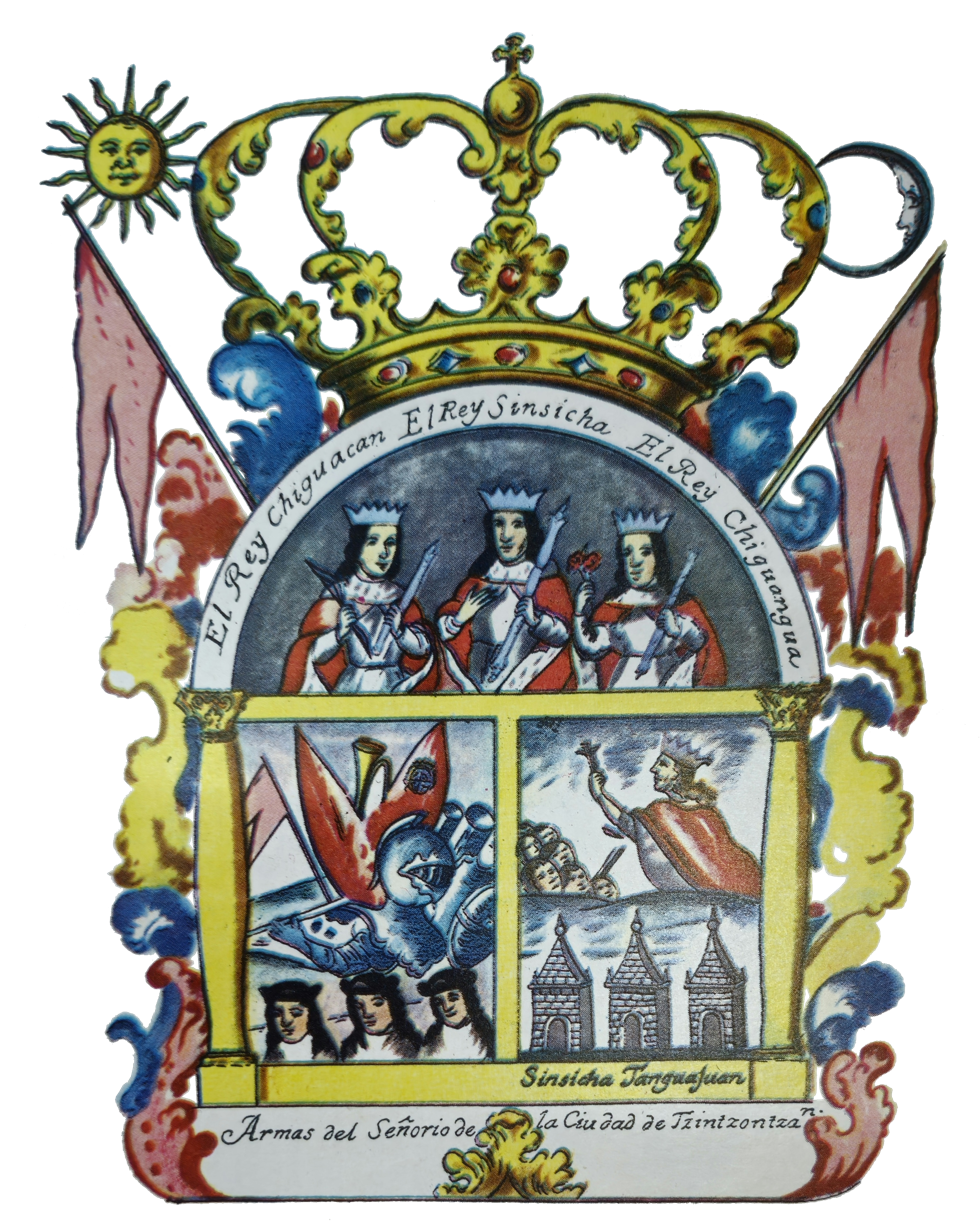
- Coat of arms

- Location in Mexico
- Coordinates: 19°37′42″N 101°34′44″W
- Country: Mexico
- State: Michoacán
- Founded: 12th century
- Municipal Status: 1930

Government
  - Municipal President: J. Abel Martinez Rojas (2008-2011)

Area
  - Total: 165.15 km^{2} (63.76 sq mi)
- Elevation (of seat): 2,050 m (6,730 ft)

Population (2005) Municipality
  - Total: 12,259
  - Seat: 3,252
- Time zone: UTC-6 (Central (US Central))

Tzintzuntzan Municipality is a municipality in the Mexican state of Michoacán. The seat is Tzintzuntzan, Michoacán.

== Municipality ==
As municipal seat, the town of Tzintzuntzan is the governing authority for 35 other named communities, including Ihuatzio, which has more population. Most of the municipality's population of 12,259 live outside of the town limits (73%). In 2005, the census counted 1,743 people who spoke an indigenous language, mostly Purépecha and Ixcateco. The municipality has a territory of 165.15 km^{2} (63.76 sq mi) and borders the municipalities of Quiroga, Morelia, Lagunillas, Huiramba, Pátzcuaro and Erongarícuaro.

The municipality is in the Trans-Mexican Volcanic Belt, in the Pátzcuaro Basin, with peaks such as Lagarto, Tariácuri and Patambicho. Its main fresh water supply is Lake Pátzcuaro. The climate is temperate with a rainy season in the summer. Most of the area is covered in forests of pine, oak and cedar trees. Animal life mostly consists of small mammals such as coyotes, squirrels, armadillos and rabbits.

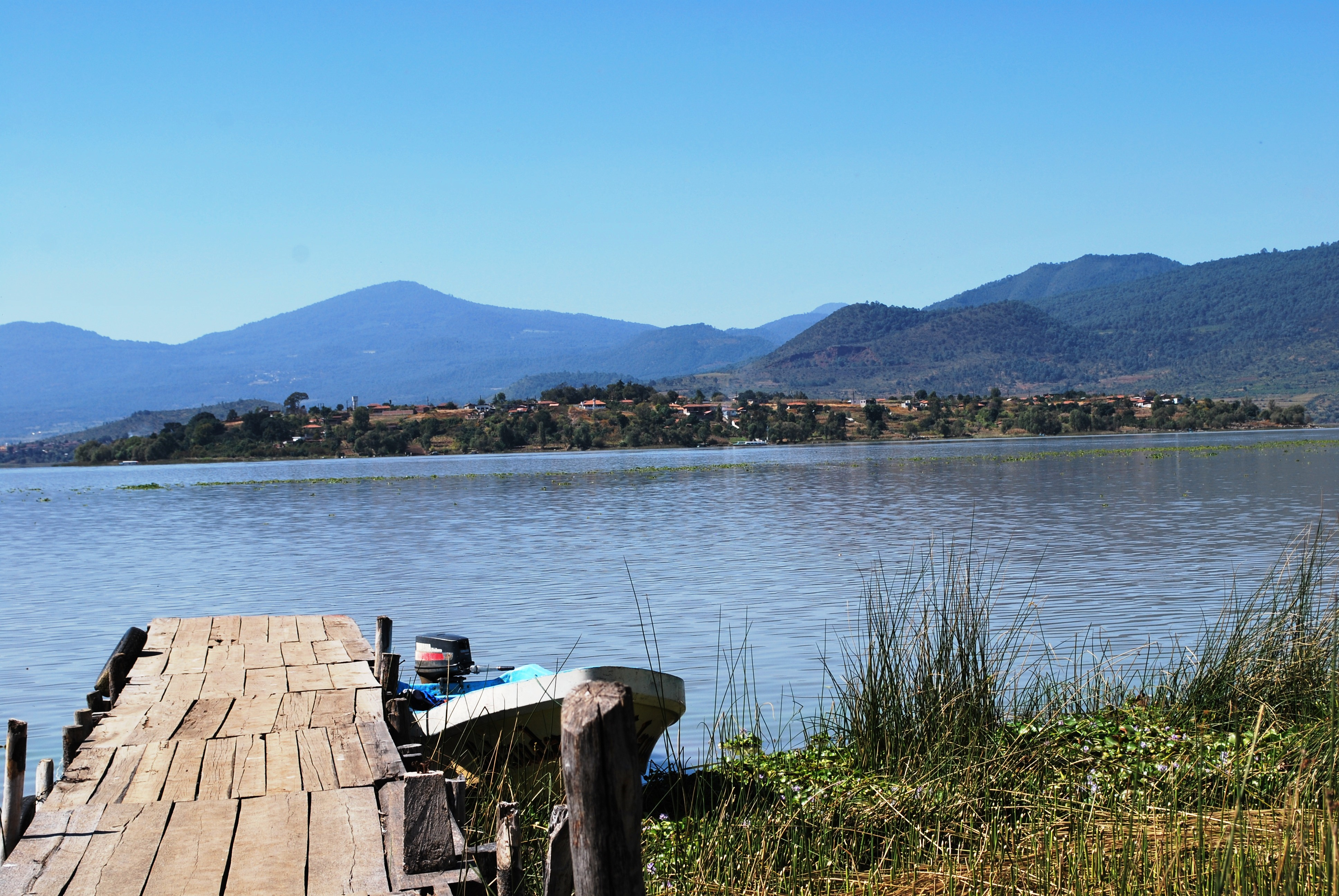
View of Pacanda Island

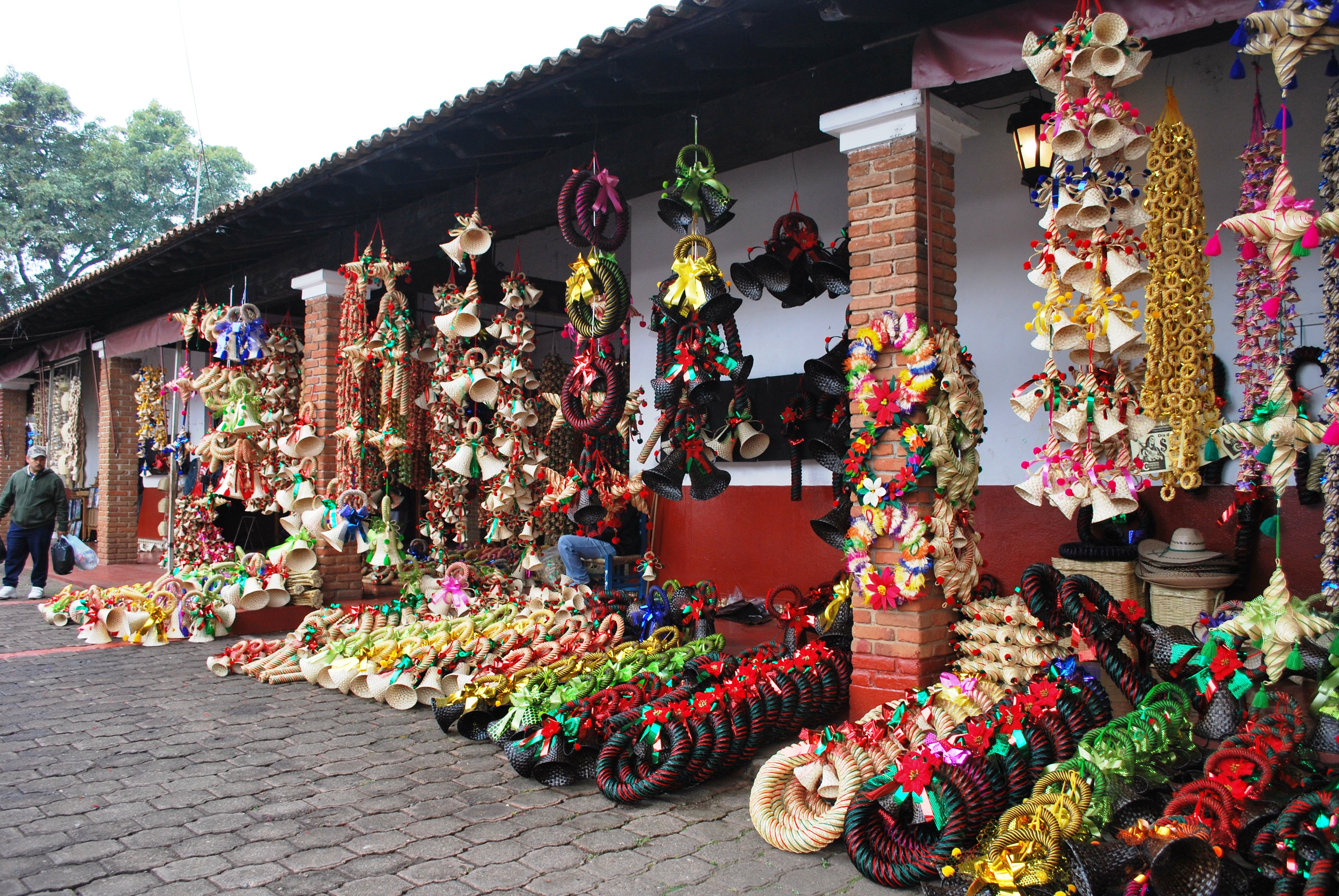
Market selling handcrafted Christmas decorations in Tzintzuntzan, Michoacan

Most of the municipality's land is suited only for forestry activities. Land which is suitable for agriculture grows corn, wheat and beans principally. Livestock such as cattle, pigs and fowl are also raised here. Some manufacturing enterprises, such as those that process food, wood and non-metallic minerals are located here. Tourism is an important earner for the municipality, especially for the lake islands of Pacanda and Yunuén, as well as the municipal seat itself with its archeological ruins. Most of the population is employed in commerce, selling pottery, textiles, embroidered items, baskets and religious figures.

The community of Ihuatzio is located just south of the town of Tzintzuntzan and was one of the other major cities of the Purépecha Empire. It was probably founded around 900 C.E. It is now a small community with an archeological site, of which only the area called the "Plaza de Armas" has been excavated. Like Tzintzuntzan, this site also contains yácatas. The small community of Santa Cruz in the municipality of Tzintzuntzan is noted for its embroidery, especially on tablecloths. Figures such as animals, humans, and saints, as well as entire landscapes, can be found in embroidery here. An experimental artificial wetland has been constructed in the community of Cucuchucho on the shores of Lake Pátzcuaro. The wetlands system contains various water treatment processes such as solid removal and storage tanks, solids wetland, clarifier wetland, maturation lagoon, aquaculture lagoon and others. The wetland project is designed to treat wastewater before it returns to Lake Pátzcuaro and processes the discharge of a population of 700 people.
