= Tepalcatepec Municipality =

Tepalcatepec City
- Municipality
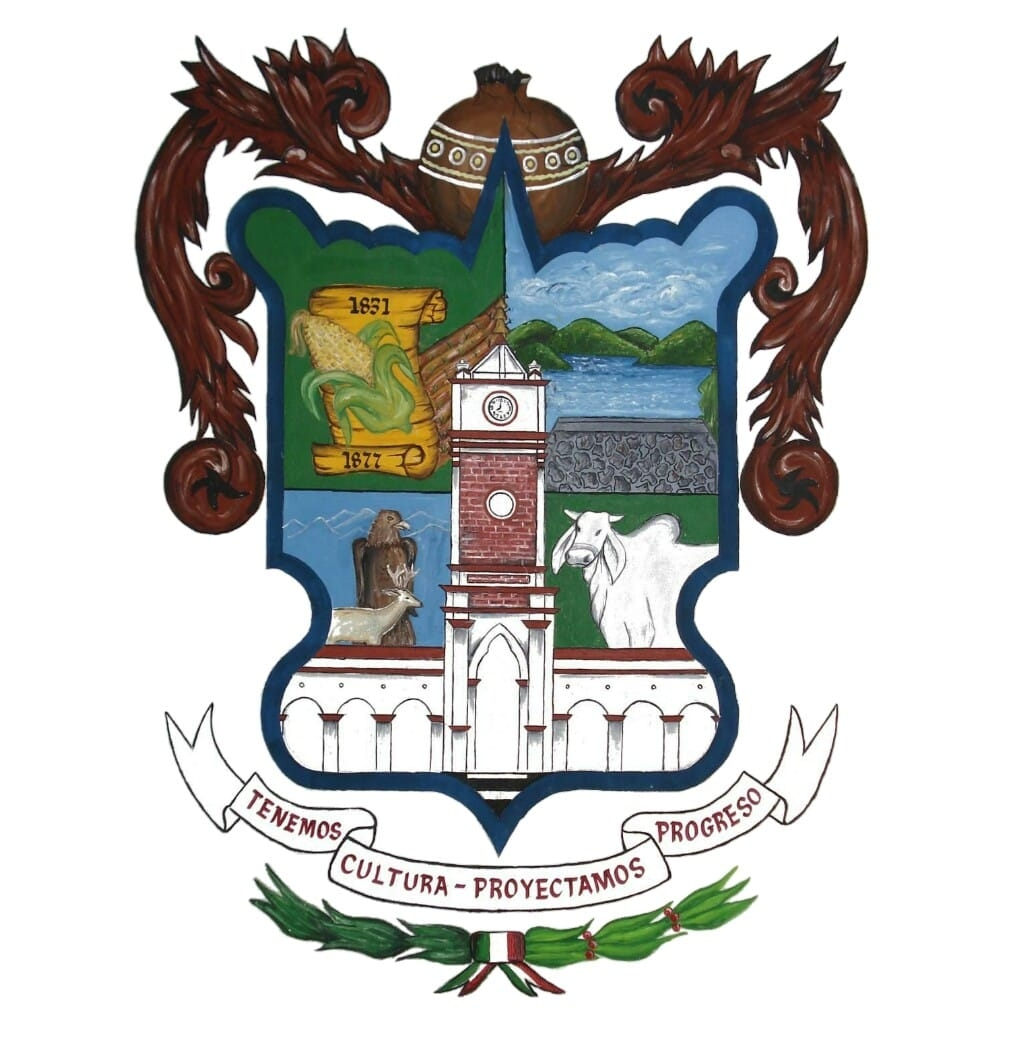
- Coat of arms

- Location of Tepalcatepec in Mexico
- Coordinates: 19°11′N 102°51′W
- Country: Mexico
- State: Michoacán
- Established: June 22, 1877
- Founder: Alonso Avalos
- Municipal seat: Tepalcatepec

Government
  - Municipal president: Felipe Martinez (PRI)

Area
  - Total: 780.22 km^{2} (301.24 sq mi)
- Elevation: 370 m (1,210 ft)

Population (2010)
  - Total: 34,568
  - Density: 44.305/km^{2} (114.75/sq mi)
- Time zone: UTC-6 (CST)

Tepalcatepec is a city and municipality in the Mexican state of Michoacan. As of the 2010 census, it has a population of 34,678.

== Geography ==
The municipality is located in the west of the state, 267 kilometres from the state capital of Morelia. It has an average altitude of 370 meters above sea level.

== History ==
Before European settlement, the area was settled by the Chichimecas tribe.

On June 22, 1877, Tepalcatepec was established as a town.

A battle between the Jalisco New Generation Cartel and state defense forces in the town left 9 dead and 11 injured. Since 2020 the town has been on lockdown due to El Abuelos cartel turf war with El Menchos cartel.
