= Tzintzuntzan =

Tzintzuntzan may refer to:

- Tzintzuntzan (Mesoamerican site), a pre-Columbian archaeological site in Mexico, former capital of the Tarascan state
- Tzintzuntzan, Michoacán, modern-day municipality and principal township serving as the administrative seat, in the state of Michoacán, Mexico
- Tzintzuntzan Municipality, whose seat is Tzintzuntzan, Michoacán
