= Gabriel Zamora =

Coordinates: 19°09′N 102°03′W

- Municipality
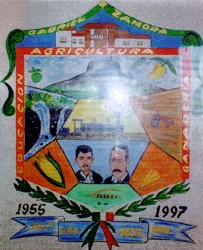
- Coat of arms

- Location in Mexico Gabriel Zamora (Mexico)
- Country: Mexico
- State: Michoacán
- Demonym: (in Spanish)
- Time zone: UTC−6 (CST)
  - Summer (DST): UTC−5 (CDT)

Gabriel Zamora is a municipality in the center of Michoacán. It covers 0.72% of the area of the state. and is bordered to the north by the municipalities of Nuevo Parangaricutiro, Uruapan and Taretan, to the east by Nuevo Urecho, to the south by Múgica, and to the west by Parácuaro. The municipality had a population of 19,876 inhabitants according to the 2005 census. Its municipal seat is the city of Lombardía.

Before having its name change to Gabriel Zamora, the municipality was known as a Hacienda de La Zanja. It was purchased by Dante Cusi and renamed Lombardia, after his native región of Lombardía, Italy.

In 1993, the municipality was and remains named after Gabriel Zamora, a Mexican farm worker, labor leader, and civil rights activist.

== See also ==
- Municipalities of Michoacán
