= Churintzio =

- Municipality
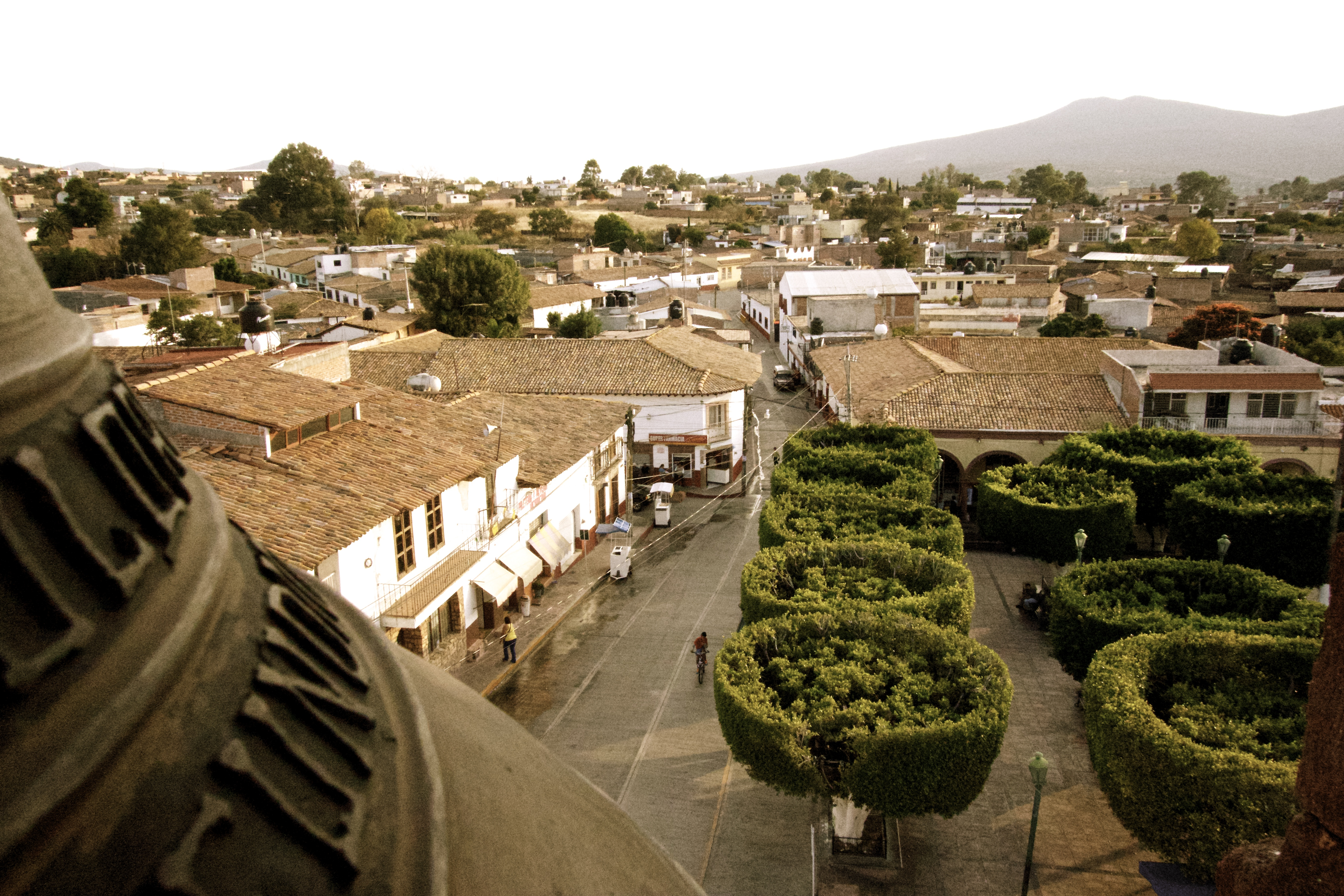
- View over the main square in the municipal seat of Churintzio

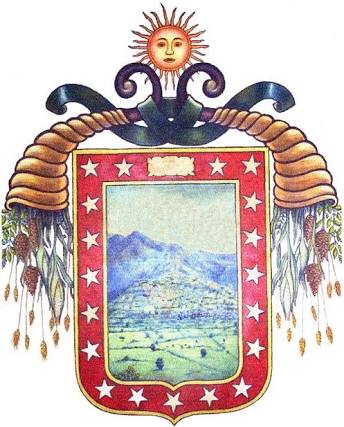
- Coat of arms

- Location in Mexico
- Coordinates: 20°08′59″N 102°03′49″W
- Country: Mexico
- State: Michoacán
- Founded: 1543
- Established: 1 March 1904
- Seat: Churintzio

Government
  - Municipal President: Francisco Javier Pérez Maldonado

Area
  - Total: 230.084 km^{2} (88.836 sq mi)
- Elevation (of seat): 1,867 m (6,125 ft)

Population (2010 Census)
  - Total: 5,564
  - Estimate (2015 Intercensal Survey): 5,016
  - Density: 24.18/km^{2} (62.63/sq mi)
  - Seat: 2,592
- Time zone: UTC-6 (Central)
- Postal codes: 59440–59455
- Area code: 328
- Website: Official website

Churintzio is a municipality in the Mexican state of Michoacán. It is located 104 kilometres (65 mi) northwest of the state capital of Morelia.

== Geography ==
The municipality of Churintzio is located in northern Michoacán at an altitude between 1,700 and 2,500 metres (5,600–8,200 ft). It borders the municipalities of Ecuandureo to the west, La Piedad to the north, Zináparo to the northeast, Penjamillo to the southeast, and Tlazazalca to the south. The municipality covers an area of 230.084 square kilometres (88.836 sq mi) and comprises 0.4% of the state's area.

Churintzio is located in the highlands of the Trans-Mexican Volcanic Belt. It is watered by intermittent streams and cold springs in the Lerma River basin.

Churintzio's climate is temperate with rain in the summer. Average temperatures in the municipality range between 16 and 20 °C (61–68 °F), and average annual precipitation ranges between 800 and 1,000 millimetres (31–39 in).

== History ==
Churintzio was founded in 1543. The place name may derive from the Purépecha words achuri, "night", or chureni, "to grow dark". It became a municipality on 1 March 1904.

== Administration ==
The municipal government comprises a president, a councillor (Spanish: síndico), and seven trustees (regidores), four elected by relative majority and three by proportional representation. The current president of the municipality is Francisco Javier Pérez Maldonado.

== Demographics ==
In the 2010 Mexican Census, the municipality of Churintzio recorded a population of 5564 inhabitants living in 1654 households. The 2015 Intercensal Survey estimated a population of 5016 inhabitants in Churintzio.

There are 19 localities in the municipality, of which only the municipal seat, also known as Churintzio, is classified as urban. It recorded a population of 2592 inhabitants in the 2010 Census.

== Economy and infrastructure ==
The main economic activities in Churintzio are agriculture and livestock production. A maquiladora manufactures clothes in the municipal seat. Federal Highway 15D traverses the municipality from east to west.

== Sister cities ==
Livingston, USA
