= Los Mismos =

Mexican Grupera band

- Origin: Ario de Rosales, Mexico
- Genre: Grupero
- Years active: 1996–present
- Label: Discos America
- Members: Pedro Velázquez; Carlos Vazquez; Gustavo Morales; Isaac Guadarrama; Carlos Ivan Salgado; Jorge Ortiz; Rafael Valenzuela
- Past members: Joel Solis; Roberto Guadarrama; Eusebio "El Chivo" Cortez; Jose "Pepe" Guadarrama; Pedro Sanchez; Roberto Guadarrama Jr. Fred Ocon

Los Mismos (English: "The Same Ones") is a Mexican Grupera music band from Ario de Rosales, Michoacán. The band was established in June 1996, after Marco Antonio Solís left the band Los Bukis, the remaining members regrouped as Los Mismos. Under the name Los Mismos, the band has released eleven albums, under five different labels, including EMI Latin, Univision Music Group, Skalona Records, Discos Power Records and Discos America. Not to be confused with the Spanish music band of the same name in the 1970s.

== Formation ==
Los Bukis

In the 1970s, cousins Marco Antonio Solís and Joel Solís began writing and performing music as a duo, known as Los Hermanitos Solis (English: "The Little Solis Brothers"). As their music and following grew, they expanded the band, using the name Los Bukis (English: "Little Kid"). Marco Antonio Solís served as the lead vocalist, while additionally writing and producing all of the band's music. Their first album sold one million records in one year, certifying the album as Diamond status, in accordance with the Asociación Mexicana de Productores de Fonogramas y Videogramas (English: "Mexican Association of Producers of Phonograms and Videograms, A.C.") guidelines. Their first song from the album was "Falso Amor" (English: "False love"). While Los Bukis continued performing and releasing new music, Marco Antonio Solís also wrote and produced albums for Marisela, Rocío Dúrcal, and María Sorté.

Los Mismos

In 1995, after 20 years with Los Bukis, lead singer and songwriter Marco Antonio Solís and band members decided to part ways, an agreement was made for neither Solís or the remaining band members to perform using the Purépecha name "buki" (English: "Little Kid") in any form. In accordance with the agreement, the remaining members of Los Bukis regrouped with Pedro Velázquez joining the group as lead vocalist. The members of Los Bukis renamed the band to Los Mismos (English: "The Same Ones"), intending for the new band has the same style as Los Bukis.

== Band members ==
- Pedro Velázquez – lead vocals (1996 – present)
- Carlos Vazquez – 1st keyboard (2021 – present)
- Gustavo Morales – 2nd keyboard, percussion (2001 – present)
- Isaac Guadarrama – bass guitar (2004 – 2012, 2017 – present)
- Jorge Ortiz – drums (2002 – 2008, 2021– present)
- Carlos Ivan Salgado – lead guitar (2018 – present)
- Rafael Valenzuela – lead guitar (1998 – 2008, 2021 – present)

Former Members

- Joel Solis – lead guitar, second vocals (1996 – 1998)
- Roberto Guadarrama – 1st keyboard, trumpet, producer, composer, arranger, Director and second vocals (1996 – 2021)
- Eusebio "El Chivo" Cortez – bass guitar (1996 – 2000, 2003 – 2004, 2012 – 2017)
- Jose "Pepe" Guadarrama – 2nd keyboard, second vocals, percussion and saxophone (1996 – 2001)
- Pedro Sanchez – drums (1996 – 2002, 2008 – 2017)
- Fred Ocon – bass guitar (2000 – 2003)
- Roberto Guadarrama Jr. – lead guitar, drums (2015 – 2021)

== Discography ==
Studio albums

- 1996: Juntos Para Siempre
- 1997: Te Llevas Mi Vida
- 1998: Ven a Mi Mundo
- 1999: Encuentro Con El Milenio
- 2000: Sin Mirar Atrás
- 2001: Perdón Por Extrañarte
- 2002: Comienza A Vivir
- 2003: Que Te Vaya Bien En Todo
- 2004: Quiero Agradecer
- 2008: Para Toda La Vida
- 2016: 20 Aniversario
