= Coahuayana =

Municipality in the Mexican state of Michoacán

Coahuayana Coahuayana de Hidalgo
- City, municipality
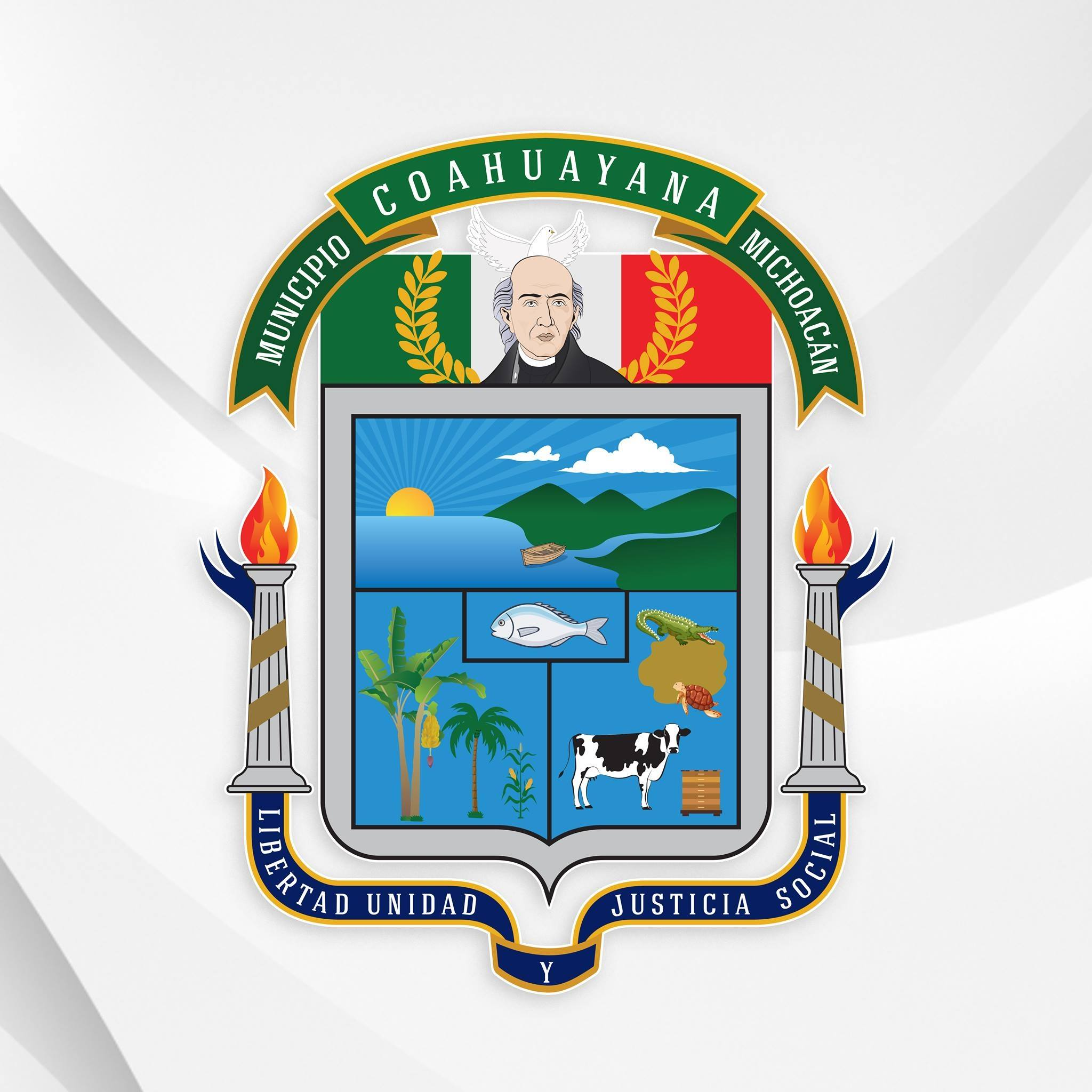
- Coat of arms

- Location within Michoacán Location within Mexico
- Coordinates: 18°45′N 103°40′W
- Country: Mexico
- State: Michoacán

Government
  - Federal electoral district: Michoacán's 12th

Population (2020)
  - Total: 17,022
- (municipality)
- Time zone: UTC-6 (Zona Centro)
- Website: coahuayana.gob.mx

Coahuayana (formally: Coahuayana de Hidalgo) is a city in the Mexican state of Michoacán. It serves as the municipal seat for the surrounding municipality of the same name, which is located on the Pacific Ocean coast and is the westernmost municipality in Michoacán.

The municipality has an area of 362.34 square kilometres (0.61% of the surface of the state) and is bordered to the north by the municipality of Chinicuila, to the south by Aquila and the Pacific Ocean, and to the west and northwest by the state of Colima. The municipality reported a population of 17,022 in the 2020 INEGI census, up from 11,632 in 2005.

Coahuayana is a word of Nahuatl origin that means "Place Where Trees and Squash are Abundant".
