= Coalcomán River =

River in Mexico

- Location of mouth

Location
- Country: Mexico
- State: Michoacán

Physical characteristics
- Source
  - location: Sierra Madre del Sur
- Mouth
  - location: Pacific Ocean, Michoacán state
  - coordinates: 18°14′06″N 103°14′21″W
  - elevation: sea level

The Coalcomán River is a river of Michoacán state, in western−central Mexico.

== Geography ==
Its watershed is in the Sierra Madre del Sur mountain range. Its river mouth is on the Pacific Coast of Mexico.

== See also ==
- Coalcomán de Vázquez Pallares — municipality on the river.
- List of rivers of Mexico
