= Chavinda =

- Municipality
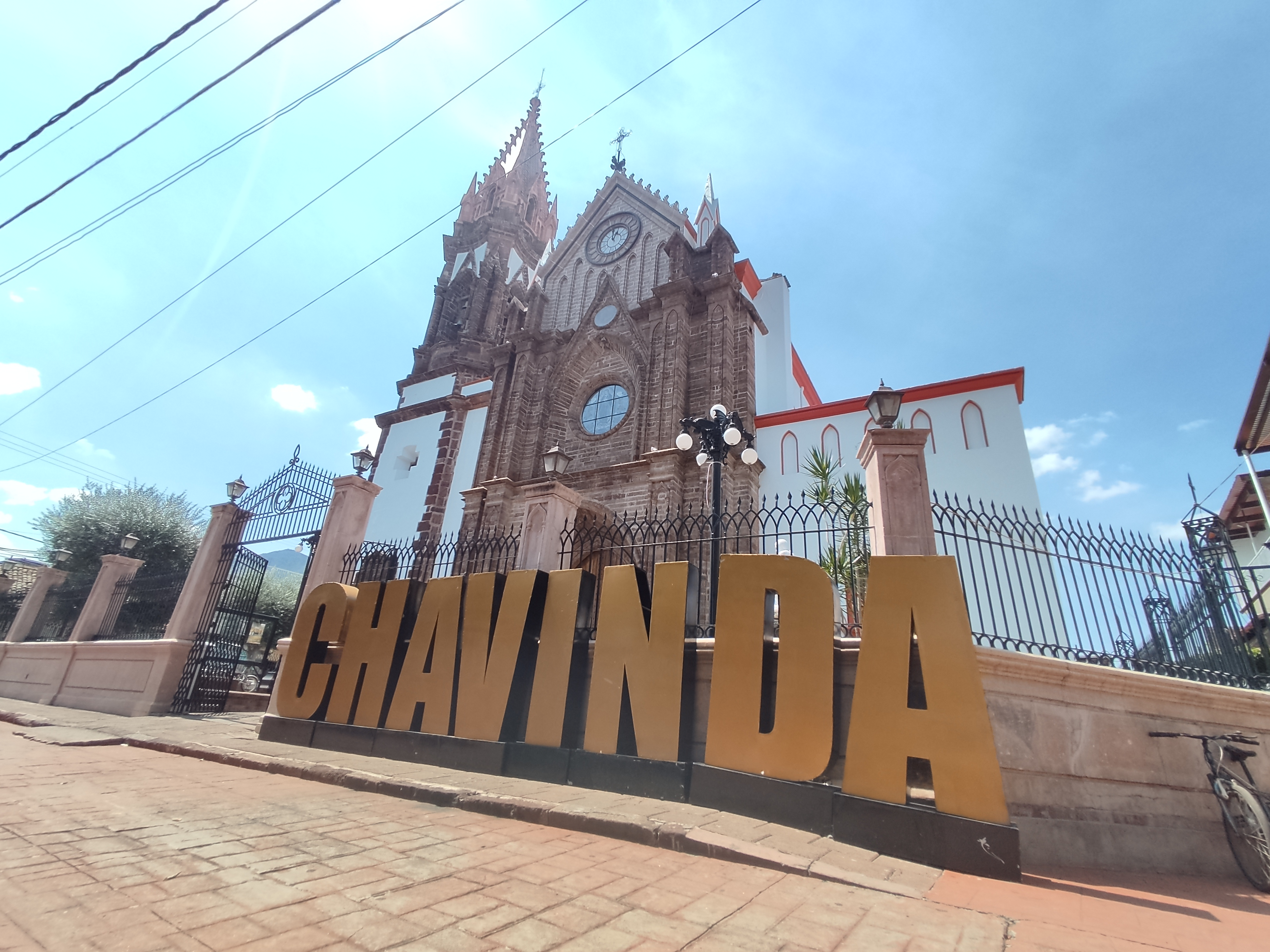

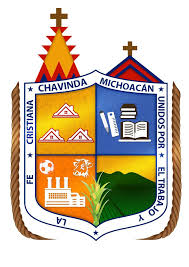
- Coat of arms

- Location of Chavinda in México
- Coordinates: 20°01′N 102°27′W
- Country: México
- State: Michoacán
- Municipality: Chavinda
- Municipal Seat: Chavinda

Area
  - Total: 151.55 km^{2} (58.51 sq mi)
- Elevation: 1,572 m (5,157 ft)

Population (2015)
  - Total: 10,258
  - Density: 67.687/km^{2} (175.31/sq mi)
- Demonym: Chavindense
- Time zone: UTC-6 (Central)
- Postal code: 59580
- Area code: 383
- Website: Official website

Chavinda is a municipality in the Mexican state of Michoacán. It is located at an elevation of 1,572 metres (5,157 feet) and is 196 kilometres (122 miles) northwest of Morelia and is 282 kilometres (175 mi) southeast of Guadalajara. The 2015 population was 10,258. To the east, 28 kilometres (17 mi) away, is Zamora, one of Mexico's quaintest towns.

The town of Chavinda is the municipal seat for the municipality. Other small towns and villages included in the municipality are La Esperanza, San Juan Palmira, and El Tepehuaje.

The name of the town has his origin in the Purépecha word sïuini (whirlwind); Place of Whirlwinds.

The town retains its ancient atmosphere. It consists of largely one-story adobe or plaster-over-brick buildings with red tile roofs. The streets are dusty cobblestones traveled by horse and car. La Plaza (the plaza) is Chavinda's central square. Bricks cover the plaza, and a kiosk stands in its center with many tiendas (stores) around.

Residents of Chavinda have found seasonal employment in the Napa Valley of California via the United States' H-2A temporary agricultural workers' visa program.

== History ==
The story registers Hernando de Bascones, Lorenzo Sánchez de Ulloa, Juan García de Cueva, Diego de Castro Guzmán and Fernando Bocanegra, as the first five settlers of the region, who were awarded real mercedes of the Chavinda Valley.

On 20 November 1861, Chavinda granted the title of municipality, but in 1874 it became dependent on the municipality of Zamora, as "tenure". On July 25, 1879, the title was reinstated.

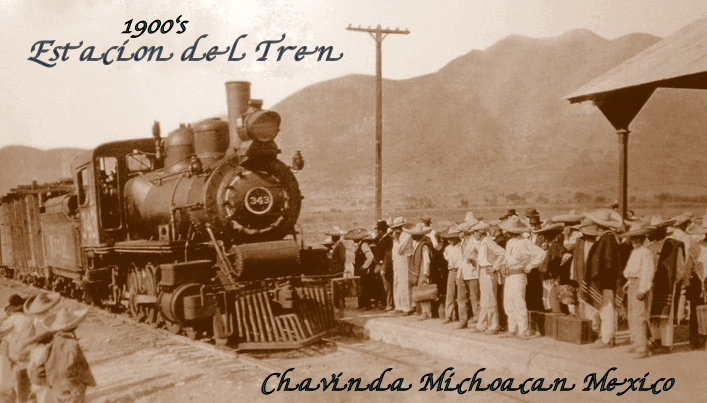
Outdoor train station c. 1900

A population census of 1880, states that Chavinda was inhabited mainly by Creoles, having a very small indigenous population. During the second half of the last century, Chavinda reached a self-sufficient local economy that unjusted when the train arrived at the population in 1899. This caused the municipality to open up to the national market and to change land tenure and some impetus to agriculture in the region. With the arrival of the train, he began the emigration of Chavinda to the United States, a practice that is preserved. The various events that took place in the early twentieth century in Mexico (the Mexican Revolution, the Cristero War, etc.) frightened trade and, therefore, economic growth.

=== Mass poisoning ===
On August 12, 1966, it was reported that a baker, Alfonso Medina, 22, had poisoned hundreds of loaves of bread using arsenic, and that hundreds of people were affected, but nobody died. On the 14th, four people were reported to have died, and by the 19th it was reported at least 69 were killed. Most sources reported roughly 600 affected, with 300 in critical condition, who were being treated in Chavinda and nearby Zamora. Medina confessed and said that it was an act of revenge against his boss, Jose Tijero, who he claimed to have bewitched him.
