= Ario Municipality =

Municipality in Michoacán, Mexico

Ario
- Municipality
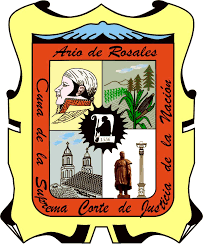
- Coat of arms

- Location within Mexico
- Coordinates: 19°12′N 101°40′W
- Country: Mexico
- State: Michoacán
- Municipal seat: Ario de Rosales

Area
  - Total: 694.60 km^{2} (268.19 sq mi)

Population (2005)
  - Total: 31,647
  - Density: 45.561/km^{2} (118.00/sq mi)
- Time zone: UTC−6 (CST)

Ario is a municipality in the Mexican state of Michoacán. The municipality has an area of 694.60 square kilometres (1.18% of the surface of the state) and is bordered to the north by Salvador Escalante, to the east by Tacámbaro and Turicato, to the south by La Huacana, to the west by Nuevo Urecho, and to the northwest by Taretán. The municipality had a population of 31,647 inhabitants according to the 2005 census. Its municipal seat is the city of Ario de Rosales.

In pre-Columbian times region was inhabited by Purepecha and Chichimeca people who knew the area as "Place where it was sent", "Place where something was sent to be said", and "Place where one learns to read", respectively.

Marco Antonio Solís and the members of the popular musical group Los Bukis, later changed to Los Mismos after Marco Antonio left the group were born in the municipality of Ario.

== See also ==
- Municipalities of Mexico
