= Zenaida Pulido =

Mexican human rights activist (1976–2019)

- Born: 1976; La Huahua, Michoacán, Mexico
- Died: 19 July 2019 (aged 42–43); Aquila, Michoacán, Mexico
- Cause of death: Gunshot wounds
- Occupation: Human rights activist
- Years active: 2003–2019
- Organization: Familiares Caminando por Justicia
- Known for: Searching for missing people in Mexico, including her husband and brother

Zenaida Pulido Lombera (1976–2019) was a Mexican human rights activist. A member of Familiares Caminando por Justicia (lit. 'Families Walking for Justice'), she was murdered while searching for her husband, Elidio Cisneros, who disappeared in 2003.

== Activism ==
Pulido was born and raised in La Huahua, Michoacán. She was married to Elidio Cisneros, with whom she had three children, and ran a seafood restaurant in Aquila. Her husband disappeared in 2003; one of her brothers was also a victim of enforced disappearance. In 2009, Pulido moved to the town of Pichilinguillo with her sister, in order to further investigate the disappearance of her husband and brother. She publicly denounced organised crime groups, which she felt were responsible for the disappearances of her family members.

In 2013, Pulido joined Familiares Caminando por Justicia, a collective of families of missing people in Mexico. Between April and May 2019, Pulido led the caravan Buscando Encontraremos (lit. 'Searching We Will Find') in a search for clandestine graves in five municipalities in Michoacán; the group found a mass grave containing at least 43 skeletal remains.

== Murder ==
On 19 July 2019, Pulido was shot dead by armed individuals while travelling in a vehicle in Aquila. She had been returning from a police station, where she had reported threats made against her. A friend who was in the car with Pulido was injured, but survived.

On 23 July, the Michoacán Attorney General's Office announced that two men, identified as Ricardo CP and Enoc CM, had been arrested in relation to Pulido's murder, and that a third individual, Jeremías J., was wanted. All three were reported to have been in a Volkswagen Jetta present at the shooting. The Attorney General stated that the murder was believed to be in relation to a land dispute involving the Knights Templar Cartel, and not linked to Pulido's activism.

== Legacy ==
Following Pulido's murder, Familiares Caminando por Justicia called on the government of President of Mexico Andrés Manuel López Obrador to "act urgently" and implement "protection measures" to safeguard Pulido's family.

The National Network of Women Human Rights Defenders in Mexico and the Mesoamerican Initiative of Women Human Rights Defenders issued a joint statement using the hashtag "#AlertaDefensoras" (lit. '#AlertDefenders'), and called for a "swift and thorough" investigation into Pulido's killing, as well as security guarantees for her family and members of Familiares Caminando por Justicia. Their statement was supported by over 30 Mexican human rights groups.

Familiares Caminando por Justicia, alongside Dónde están los desaparecidos, held two memorials for Pulido in Michoacán, in which they called for an end of violence against human rights activists.
