= Zináparo =

Zináparo Municipality
- Municipality
- Location of Zináparo in Mexico
- Coordinates: 20°10′N 102°00′W
- Country: Mexico
- State: Michoacán
- Established: 1927
- Municipal seat: Zináparo

Government
  - Municipal president: Jesus Zamudio (Morena)

Area
  - Total: 113.38 km^{2} (43.78 sq mi)
- Elevation: 1,840 m (6,040 ft)

Population (2010)
  - Total: 3,247
  - Density: 28.64/km^{2} (74.17/sq mi)
- Time zone: UTC-6 (CST)

Zináparo is a municipality in the Mexican state of Michoacán. It is the least populous municipality in Michoacán.

== Political entity ==
The municipality is located in the north part of Michoacán, in the Bajío region, 145 kilometers from the state capital of Morelia. It has a territory of 113.38 square kilometers, it borders the municipalities of La Piedad, Numarán, Penjamillo and Churintzio. The municipal government comprises municipal president, a council (síndico), four trustees (regidores) elected by relative majority and three trustees elected by proportional representation. The main economic activities are agriculture (Corn, Sorgum, agave, wheat, garbanzo beans, cattle raising (Cows, goats, sheep, and pigs) trade and pottery (Saltillo tile, roof tile and clay pitchers.

== Geography ==
It is located in the Bajio region in the northern part of the state of Michoacán. It has an average altitude of 1840 meters (6072 ft) above sea level. Its relief is mainly constituted by the transversal volcanic system and the Purépero hills. There are no important streams, only small springs and seasonal creeks. The climate is temperate with temperatures ranging between 14°C and 30°C. It is semi-dry with rains in the summer. The annual average rainfall is 900.0 mm. The Pico del Aguila (~2550 msm =8415 ft) is located within the municipality.

The ecosystem is dominated by nopales (Cactus), Mesquite, prairie, pastureland in low lands and mixed forest with pine and oak trees in high altitude. Typical fauna includes species such as coyotes, opossums, rattle snakes, road runners, ducks, turtledoves, squirrels and weasel.

== History ==
Zináparo is a Chichimeca name which means "obsidian place" even though it can be translated to "place of doctors". It was a pre-Hispanic population, and it was first recognized by the Spanish government in 1613. In 1822, Zináparo was a community of muleteers and farmers. In 1863, it became a municipality, being added to La Piedad district. In 1894, it lost its municipal status under a territorial law issued that year. In 1903, it was recognized by Michoacán's government as a municipality once again.
