= Ihuatzio =

Locality in Michoacán, Mexico

- Locality
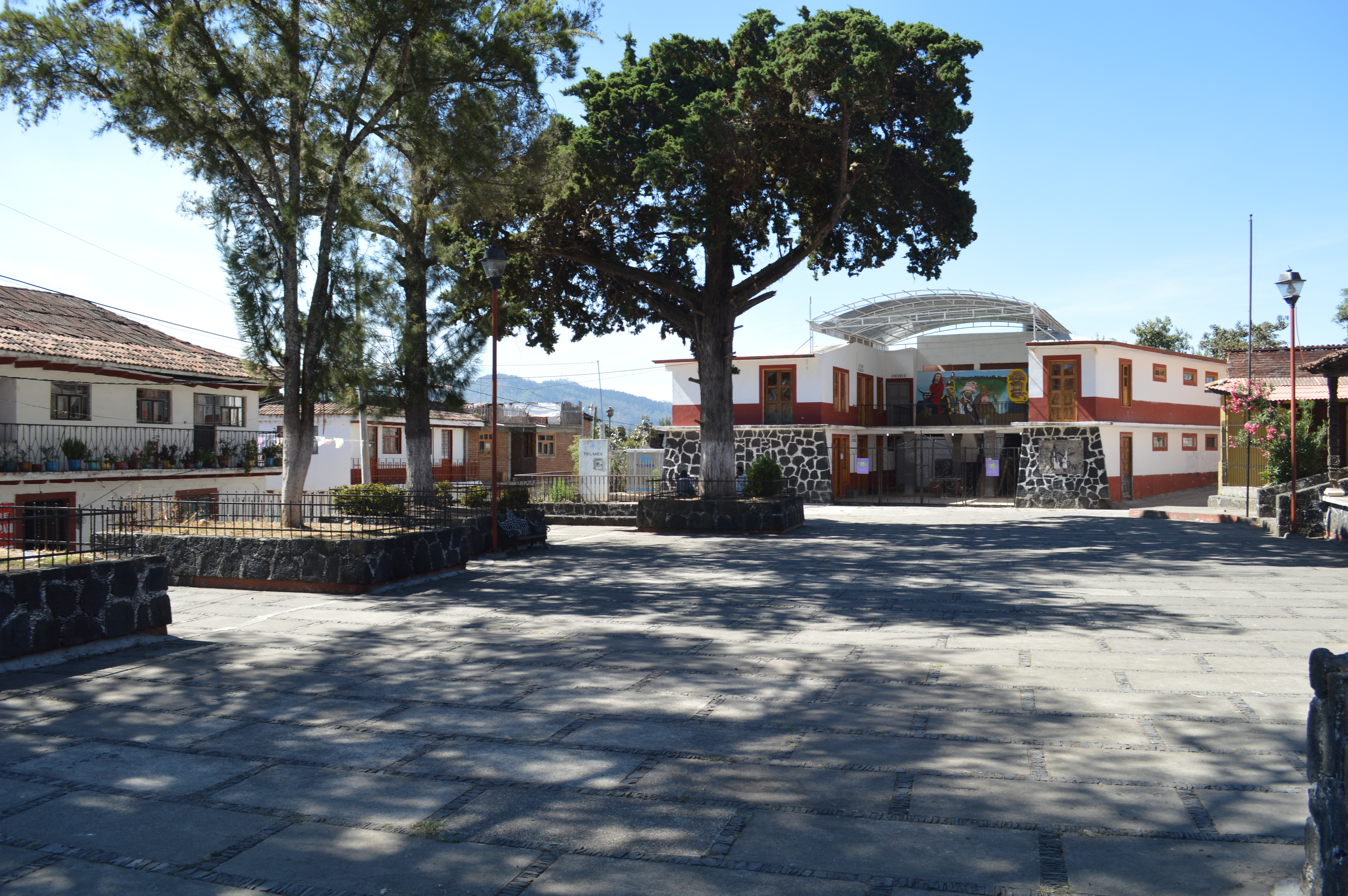
- Main plaza of Ihuatzio

- Location within Michoacán Location within Mexico
- Coordinates: 19°33′58″N 101°37′03″W
- Country: Mexico
- State: Michoacán
- Municipality: Tzintzuntzan

Area
  - Total: 1.40 km^{2} (0.54 sq mi)
- Elevation: 2,052 m (6,732 ft)

Population (2020)
  - Total: 3,950
  - Density: 2,820/km^{2} (7,310/sq mi)
- Time zone: UTC-6 (ZC)
- Postal code: 58442

Ihuatzio, which translates to "Land of Coyotes" in the Purépecha language, is a town located near Lake Pátzcuaro in the Mexican state of Michoacán. It was once the capital of the Purépecha kingdom. It was the capital until the change to Tzintzuntzan. As of the year 2020, it has a total population of 3,950.

== Geography ==
Ihuatzio is located on the southeast of the Lake Pátzcuaro, about 8 kilometers southwest of the town center of Tzintzuntzan. Its average elevation is 2,052 meters above the sea level.

== Climate ==
Ihuatzio has Subtropical Highland Climate (Cwb). It sees the least precipitation in December, with an average rainfall of 22 mm; and the most precipitation in July, with an average rainfall of 355 mm.

Climate data for Ihuatzio
Month	Jan	Feb	Mar	Apr	May	Jun	Jul	Aug	Sep	Oct	Nov	Dec	Year
Mean daily maximum °C (°F)	21.0 (69.8)	22.8 (73.0)	24.5 (76.1)	26.7 (80.1)	26.1 (79.0)	23.0 (73.4)	21.7 (71.1)	21.9 (71.4)	21.5 (70.7)	21.7 (71.1)	21.4 (70.5)	21.0 (69.8)	22.8 (73.0)
Daily mean °C (°F)	14.1 (57.4)	15.4 (59.7)	16.8 (62.2)	18.9 (66.0)	19.0 (66.2)	17.5 (63.5)	16.5 (61.7)	16.6 (61.9)	16.3 (61.3)	16.0 (60.8)	15.2 (59.4)	14.4 (57.9)	16.4 (61.5)
Mean daily minimum °C (°F)	9.0 (48.2)	9.9 (49.8)	11.1 (52.0)	13.0 (55.4)	13.6 (56.5)	13.3 (55.9)	12.7 (54.9)	12.6 (54.7)	12.3 (54.1)	11.4 (52.5)	10.1 (50.2)	9.5 (49.1)	11.5 (52.8)
Average rainfall mm (inches)	35 (1.4)	31 (1.2)	32 (1.3)	35 (1.4)	140 (5.5)	260 (10.2)	355 (14.0)	336 (13.2)	293 (11.5)	150 (5.9)	56 (2.2)	22 (0.9)	1,745 (68.7)
Source: Climate-Data.org

== Archaeological site ==
Ihuatzio is also the name of an archeological site located at the southern slopes of “Cerro Tarhiata K'eri”, just north of the town of Ihuatzio, in the Tzintzuntzan municipality, of Michoacán state. The site is some 7 kilometers south-east of Tzintzuntzan, on the south-eastern shore of the Lake Pátzcuaro. Human settlements vestiges are registered from two different occupational periods; the first occurred between 900 and 1200 CE, corresponding to Nahuatl-speaking groups; the second group corresponding to the maximum development reached by the Purépecha culture, between 1200 and 1530 CE.

== Galleries ==
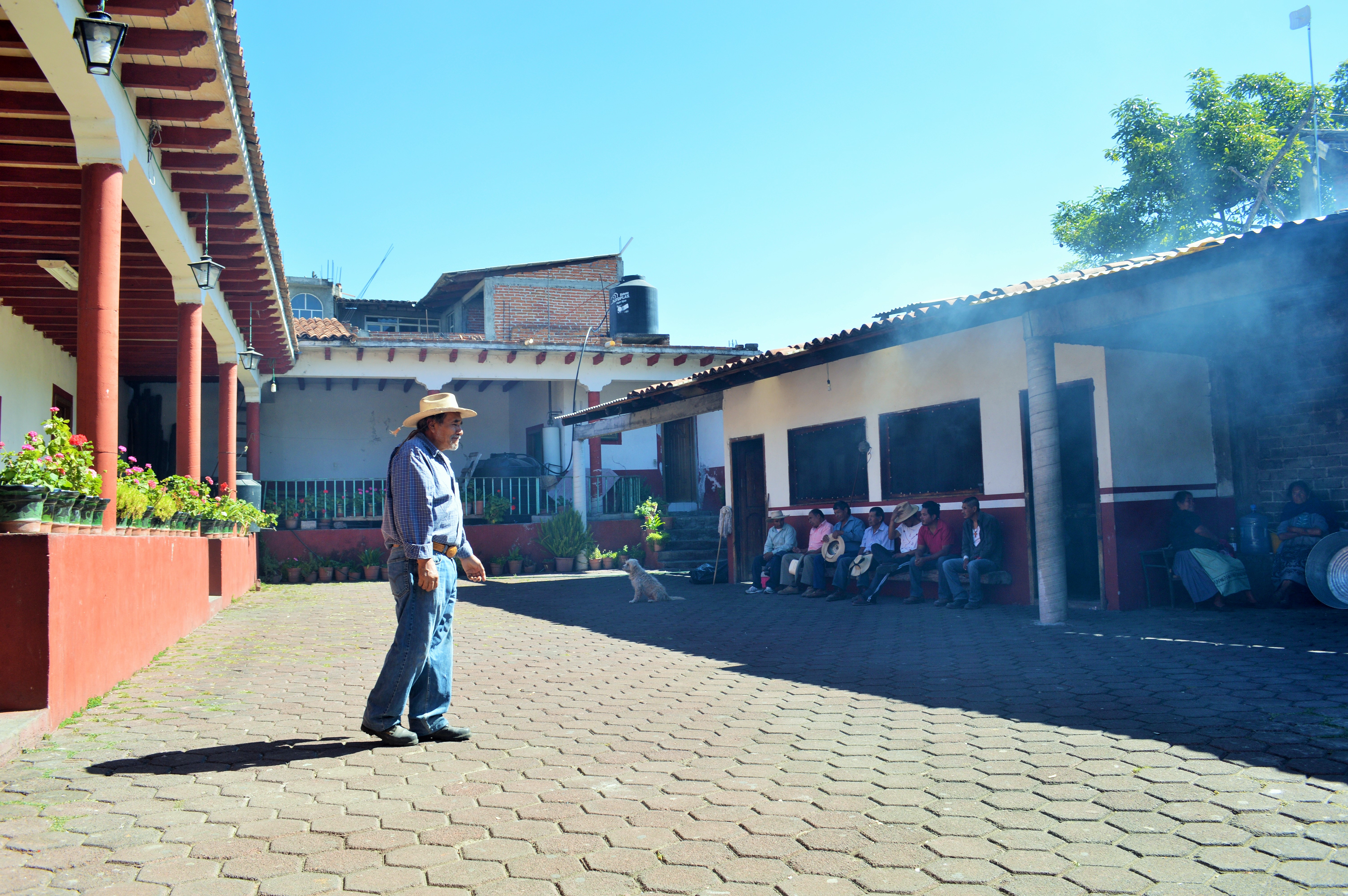
Inside of the Huatapera (enclosed patio) of Ihuatzio

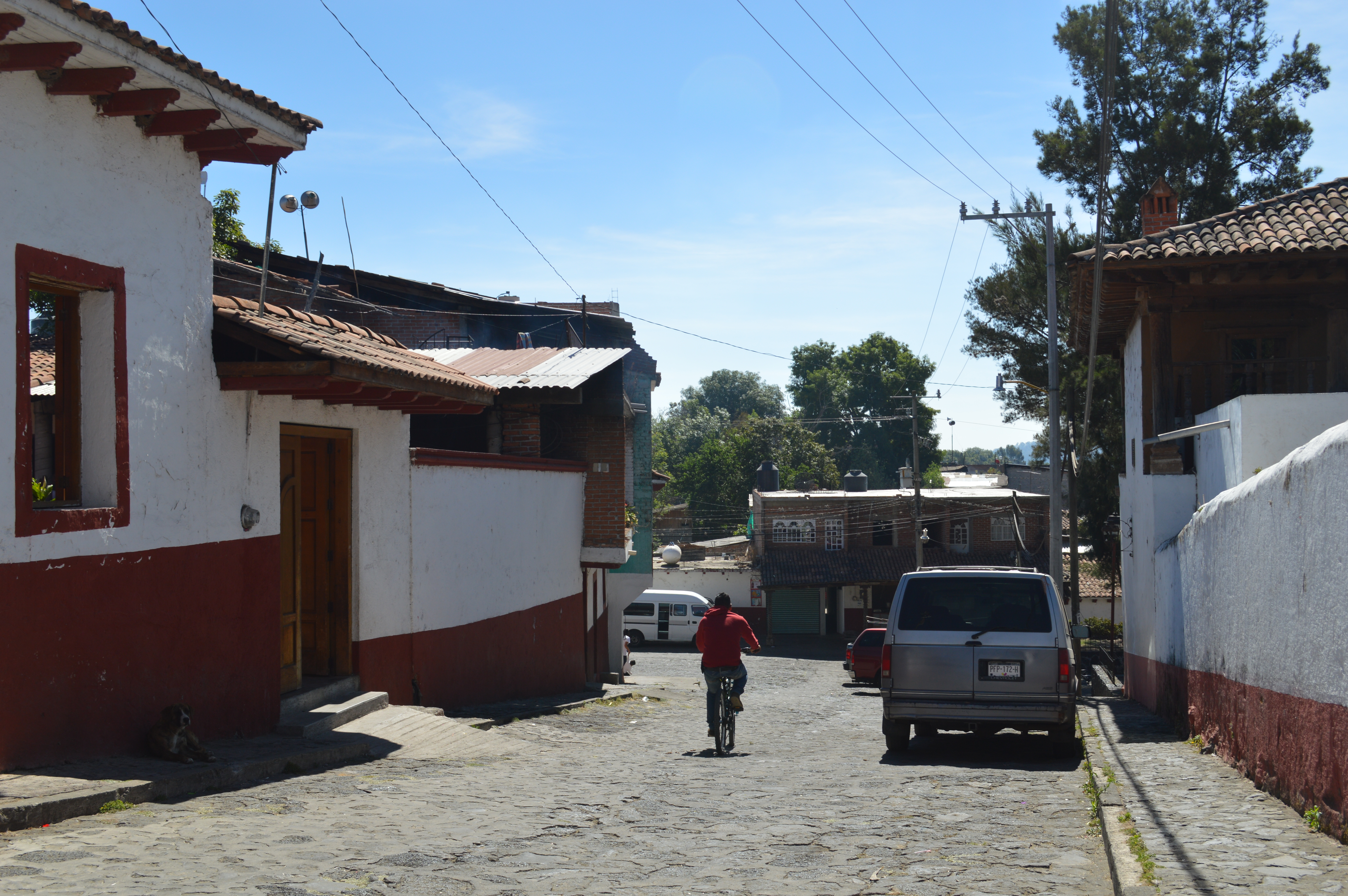
Vasco de Quiroga street by the parish

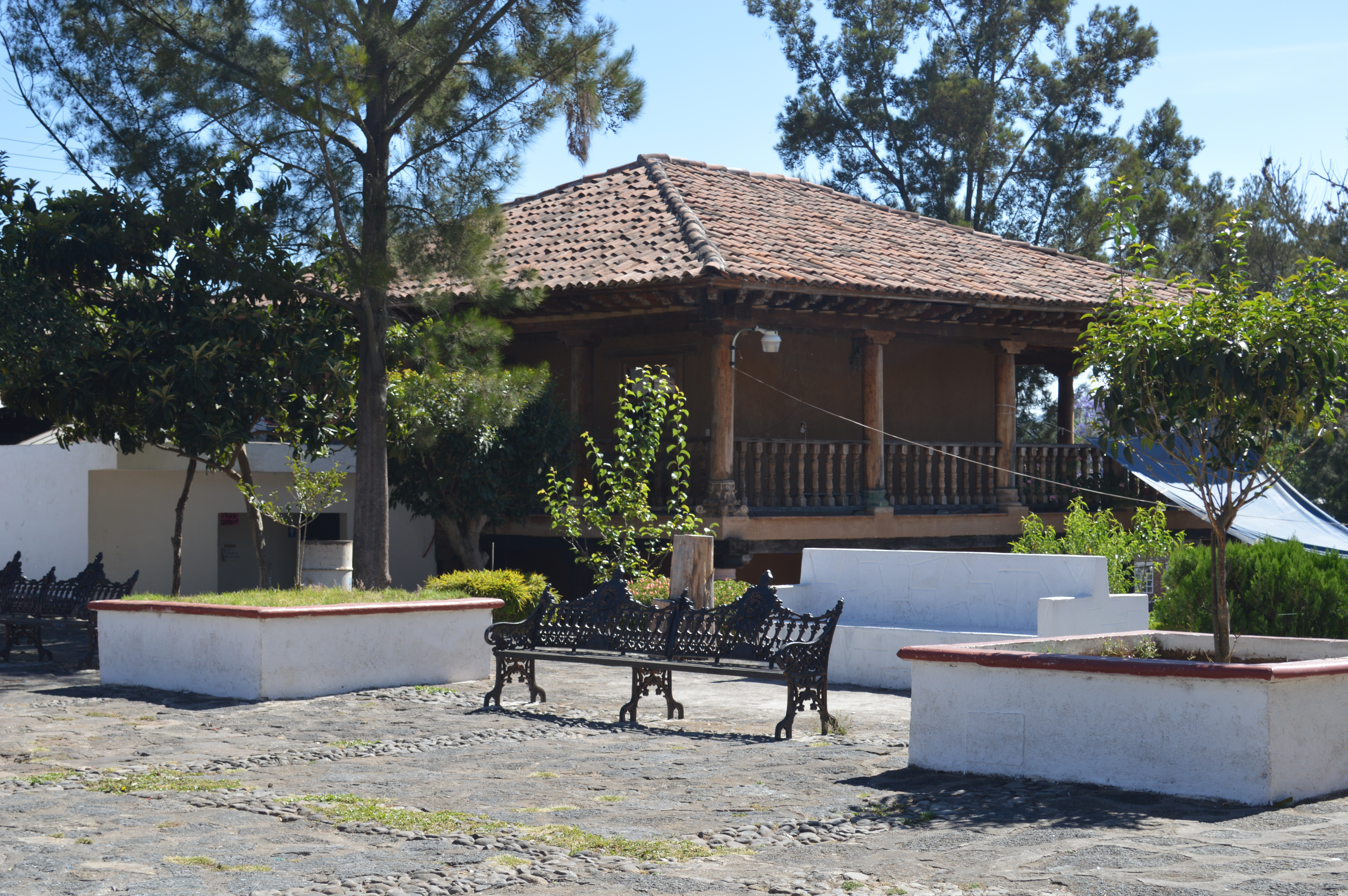
Building in atrium of the Parish

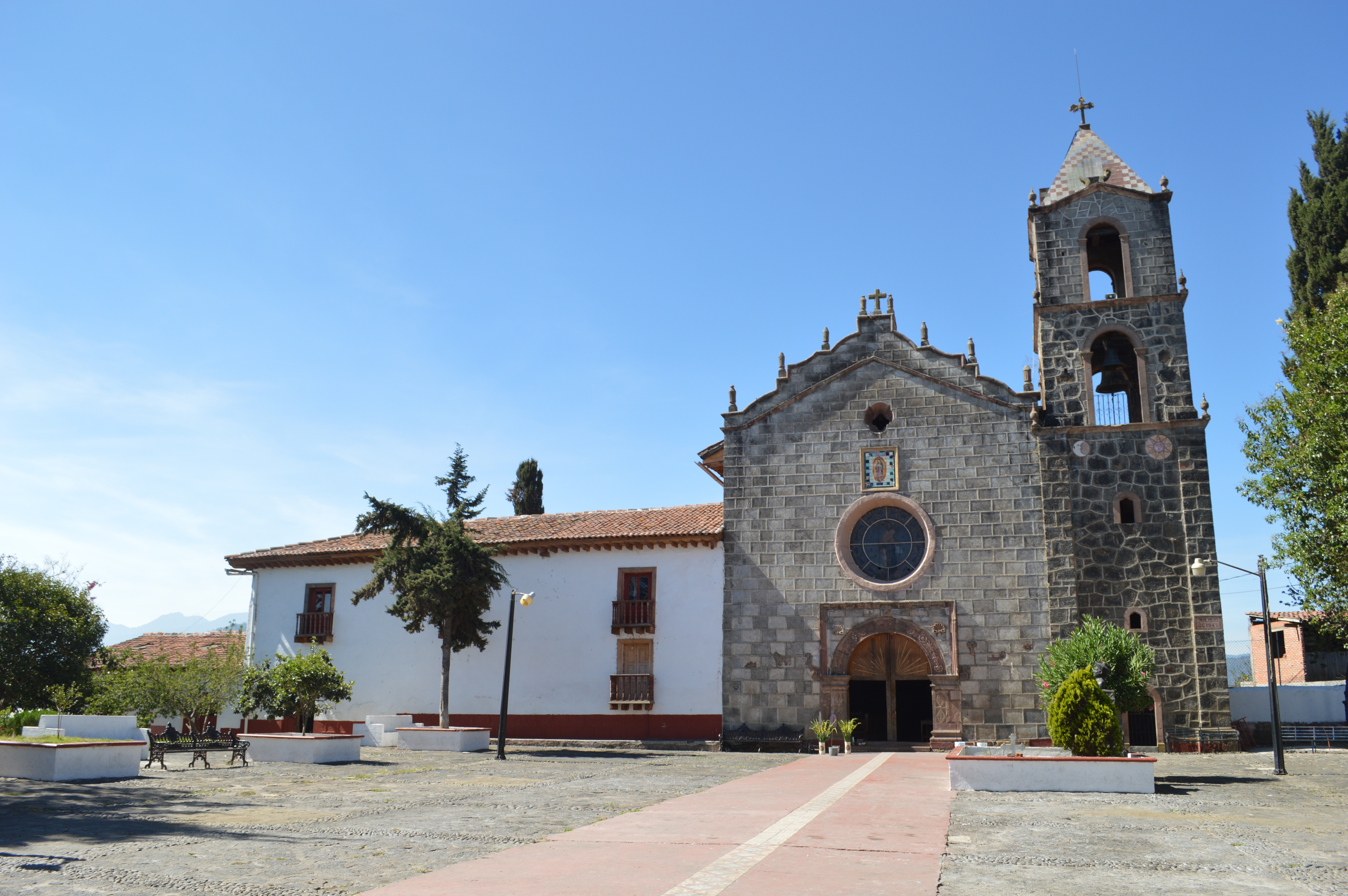
Local church
