= Nuevo Urecho =

Coordinates: 19°10′N 101°52′W

- Municipality
- Location in Mexico Nuevo Urecho (Mexico)
- Country: Mexico
- State: Michoacán
- Demonym: (in Spanish)
- Time zone: UTC−6 (CST)

Nuevo Urecho is a municipality located in the center of the Mexican state of Michoacán. The municipality has an area of 330.66 square kilometres (0.56% of the surface of the state) and is bordered to the north by the municipality of Taretan, to the east by Ario, to the south by La Huacana, and to the west by Gabriel Zamora. The municipality had a population of 7,722 inhabitants according to the 2005 census. Its municipal seat is the city of the same name.

In pre-Columbian times Urecho was successively habiatated by Chichimecas and then the powerful Purépecha people. Urecho means "Place Located in Tierra caliente".

== See also ==
- Municipalities of Michoacán
