= Briseñas =

- Municipality
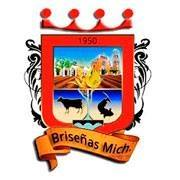
- Coat of arms
- Interactive map of Briseñas
- Coordinates: 20°16′N 102°34′W
- Country: Mexico
- State: Michoacán

Government
  - Type: Municipality

Population (2010)
  - Total: 10,653
- Time zone: UTC-6 (CST)
- Website: http://www.brisenas.gob.mx/

Briseñas is a municipality in the Mexican state of Michoacán. The capital of the municipality is Briseñas de Matamoros. The population of the community according to the INEGI, is 10,653 (2010).

== History ==
It was an hacienda in which the Territorial Law of September 11, 1932, granted the category of tenancy within the municipality of Vista Hermosa. During the government of General Lázaro Cárdenas, when the agrarian reform was applied and the land was distributed, the farmers of this place were given 2,726 hectares. Years later, due to the promotion carried out by Mr. José Magaña Pérez, the Congress of the State of Michoacán decreed in 1959, the formation of the municipality, elevating the town to the category of principal town, with the name of Briseñas de Matamoros.
