= Quiroga, Michoacán =

Quiroga
- Municipality
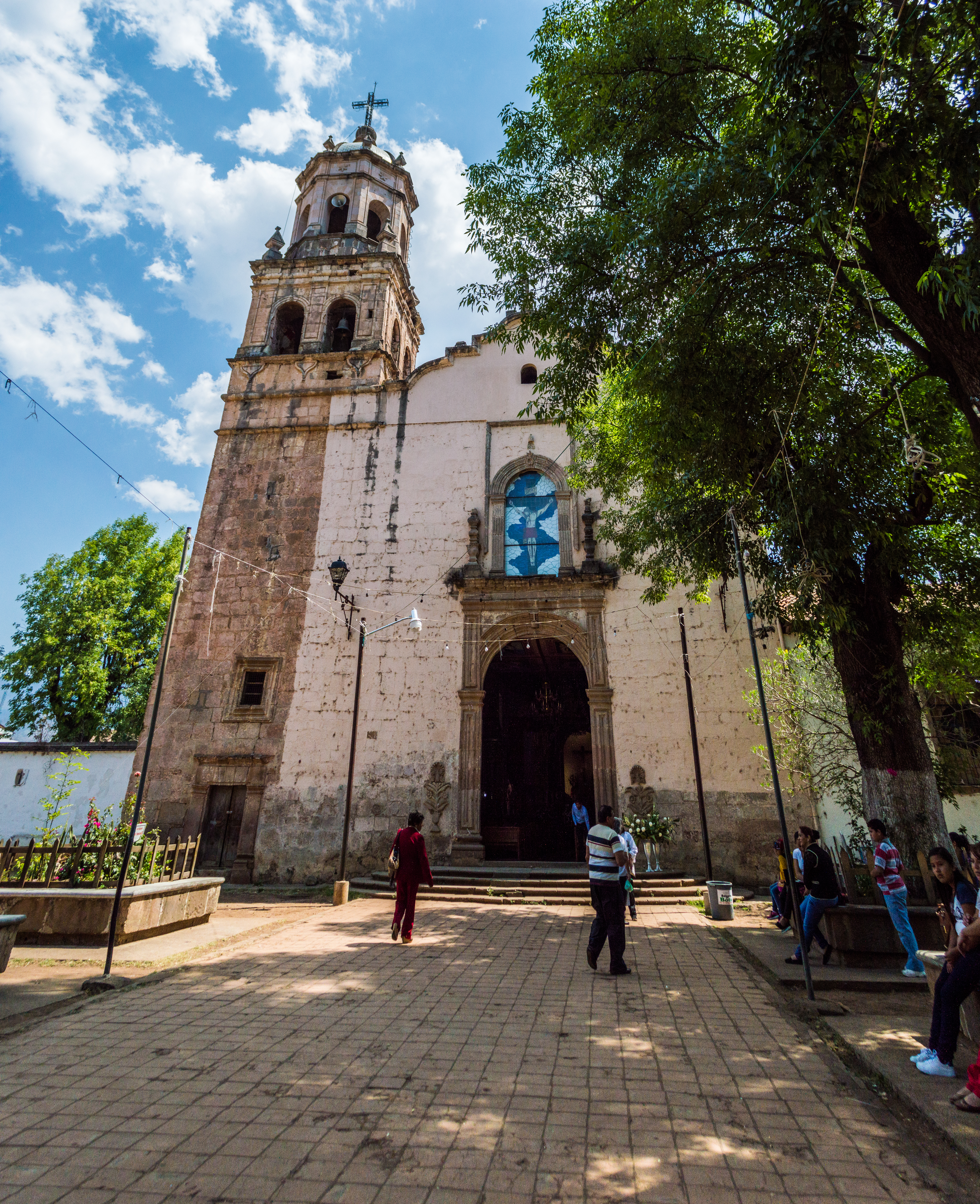

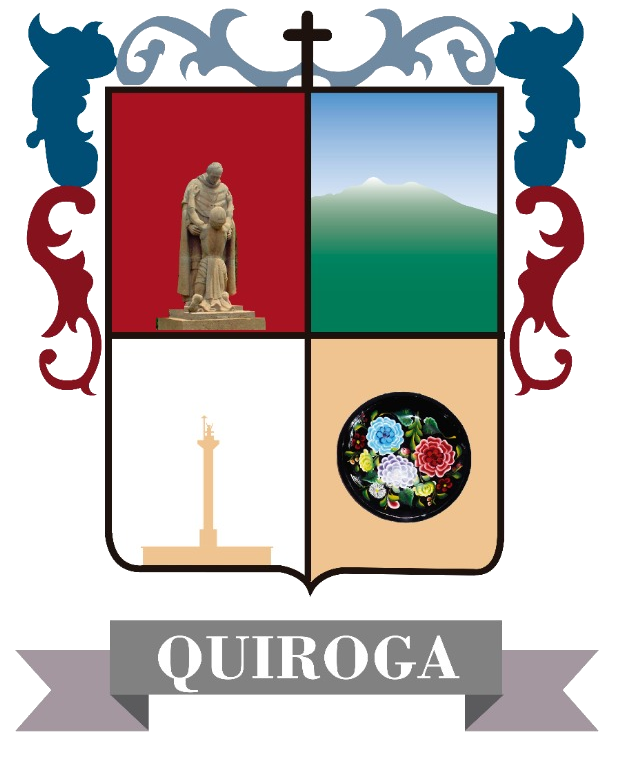
- Coat of arms

- Location of Quiroga in Michoacán
- Coordinates: 19°40′N 101°32′W
- Country: Mexico
- State: Michoacán

Government
  - Municipal president: Jessica C. Perez (PAN)

Area
  - Total: 211.52 km^{2} (81.67 sq mi)
- Elevation: 2,080 m (6,820 ft)

Population (2020)
  - Total: 27,176
  - Seat: 15,249
- Time zone: UTC-6 (CST)

Quiroga is a municipality in the Mexican state of Michoacán. The municipal seat of Quiroga is also called Quiroga.

== Geography ==
The municipality of Quiroga is located at the north of the State, at coordinates 19° 40 'N latitude and 101° 32' west. At an altitude of 2080 meters above sea level. Coeneo bordered on the north, east to Morelia, on the south by Tzintzuntzan, and on the west by Erongarícuaro. Its distance from the State capital is 45 km (27.96 miles).

Quiroga has an area of 211.52 square kilometers, accounting for 0.35 percent of total state.

=== Climate ===
The climate is mild, with rain in the summer. It has an annual rainfall of 788.6 cubic millimeters and temperatures ranging from 5.0 to 25.0 °C.

Climate data for Quiroga
| Month | Jan | Feb | Mar | Apr | May | Jun | Jul | Aug | Sep | Oct | Nov | Dec | Year |
|---|---|---|---|---|---|---|---|---|---|---|---|---|---|
| Mean daily maximum °C (°F) | 23.0 (73.4) | 24 (75) | 26.0 (78.8) | 27.6 (81.7) | 28.7 (83.7) | 26.7 (80.1) | 24.5 (76.1) | 25 (77) | 25 (77) | 24.6 (76.3) | 24.2 (75.6) | 23.0 (73.4) | 25.2 (77.4) |
| Mean daily minimum °C (°F) | 4.5 (40.1) | 5.1 (41.2) | 6.3 (43.3) | 8.2 (46.8) | 9.8 (49.6) | 10.7 (51.3) | 10.4 (50.7) | 10.8 (51.4) | 10.3 (50.5) | 8.4 (47.1) | 6.6 (43.9) | 5.2 (41.4) | 8.0 (46.4) |
| Average precipitation mm (inches) | 23 (0.9) | 7.6 (0.3) | 5.1 (0.2) | 5.1 (0.2) | 36 (1.4) | 140 (5.7) | 200 (7.7) | 190 (7.3) | 130 (5.2) | 66 (2.6) | 10 (0.4) | 10 (0.4) | 820 (32.3) |
Source: Weatherbase

== Political structure ==
The municipal president is the chairman of the city council and represents the municipality to the state and federal government, promoting rules and statutes for the proper operation and control of life of the inhabitants of the municipality of Quiroga. The current municipal president of Quiroga is Genaro Coria .

The aldermen approve or disapprove laws proposed by the president, as well as requests made by the public. The municipality has 7 aldermen, each of whom heads one of the following committees: Indigenous Affairs, Urban Development, Health, Ecology and Environment, Women's Affairs, Public Education, Agricultural Affairs. The trustee is responsible for guarding the municipal heritage, as well as dispensing justice and ensuring the correct use of resources through the Municipal Treasury.

== History ==
=== Prehispanic Era ===
Quiroga is a municipality that started before the colonial era. Quiroga was an indispensable road from Purepecha capital “Tzintzuntzan” to the ceremonial center “Zacapu”. Zacapu was known as “Cocupao” which means “Lugar de recepción” ("Place of reception"). This municipality was not widely known in the prehispanic era. Although Quiroga was a small town with a limited population, its proximity to other important purepecha centers, such as Tzintzuntzan and Zacapu, allowed it to play an important role in the region's cultural and economic interactions. This geographic location facilitated the frequent exchange of goods, resources, and customs, integrating Quiroga into the broader Purepecha commercial network that connected various towns across the empire.

=== Colony ===
When the Order of the Franciscans arrived at Quiroga, they gave it the name San Diego Cocupao, by San Diego Alcala, a name that so far leads the parish. After the arrival of the Spaniards, it began to grow in population leading to the city of today. Quiroga was established as a town, by territorial law, on December 10, 1831. By decree of the State Congress on September 6, 1852, it was called Villa de Quiroga, to honor the memory of bishop of Michoacan, Don Vasco de Quiroga.

== Demographics ==
The total population in 2000 in the municipality of Quiroga is 23,890, of whom 11,327 are men and 12,566 are women. The economically active population in 2000 was 4757 people.

== Economy ==
Historically, the municipality of Quiroga has had a flourishing economy that has been reflected in the existence of different industries such as bottling soft drinks in the first half of the twentieth century. Overall, farming has been a major activity for the people of this municipality who cultivated maize, wheat, beans, and alfalfa. The raising of cattle in the municipality has been undermined as a result of the lack of a center for collection and a method of distribution. Some industries in the municipality include footwear, industrial blacksmithing and souvenir making. The municipality of Quiroga has one of the largest markets and offers some of the most important crafts of Michoacan. Marketing and crafts are considered to be some of the main sources of income because they attract tourism.

Quiroga is renowned in Michocan for its carnitas, sold in the city's restaurants, street food carts, and market stalls.

== Notable sites ==
=== Patzcuaro Lake ===
Patzcuaro Lake, which provides resources such as fish and water, is situated near Quiroga.

=== Chupicuaro ===
This is a romantic bay on the northeast side of Lake Patzcuaro which has courts for volleyball and basketball, restaurants, and also landscaping and playground equipment.

=== Stone bell ===
This is a camping site which is located in the hills east of this municipality.

=== Squares of High Madrigal de las Altas Torres (a Don Vasco de Quiroga) and Belisario Dominguez ===
Located in the municipality.

== Notable people ==
- Bishop Leopoldo Lara Torres (1874–1933)
