= Huiramba =

Town in Huiramba Municipality, Michoacán, Mexico

Coordinates: 19.546°N 101.438°W

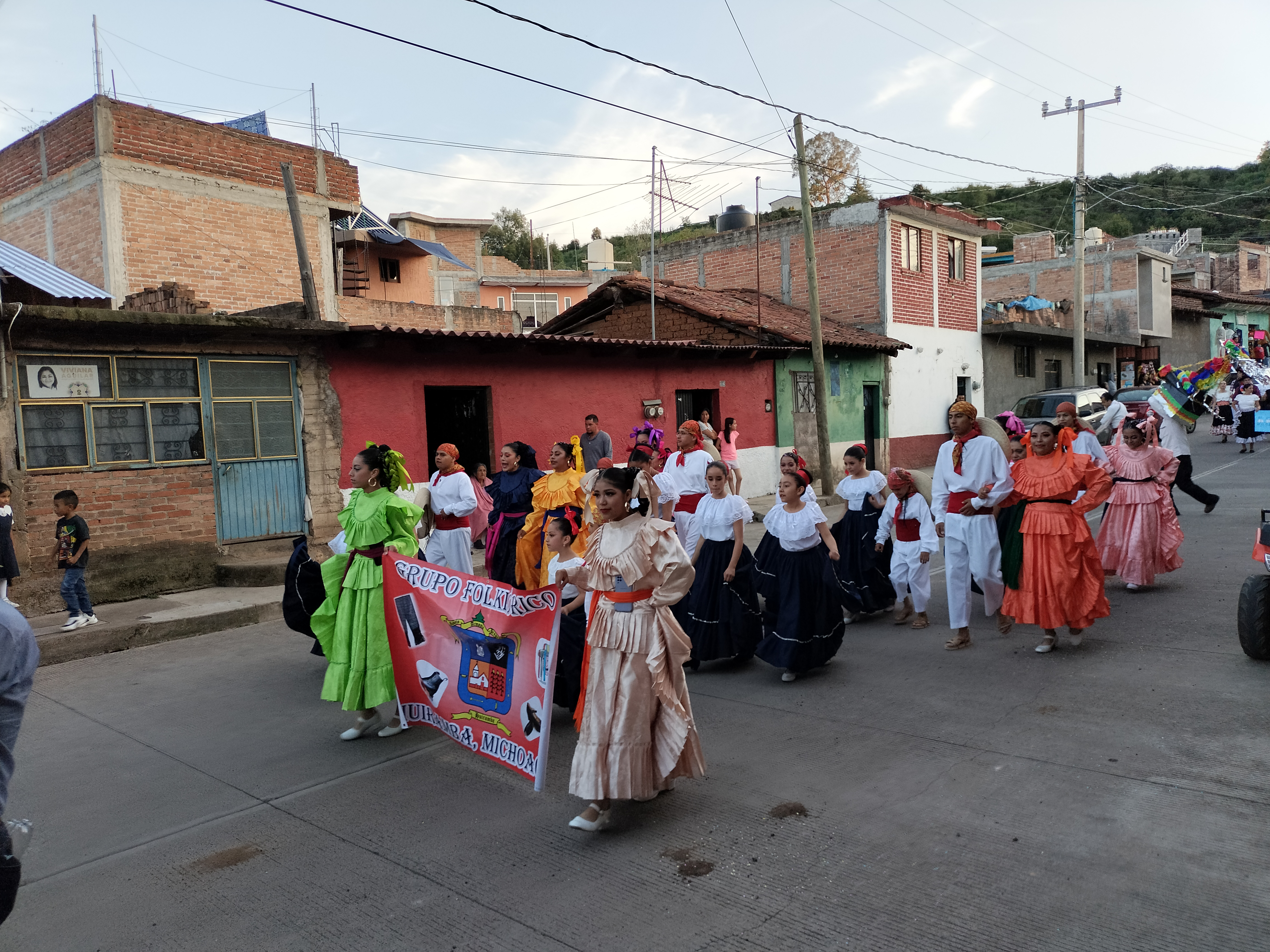
Dancers participate in a parade in Huiramba

Huiramba is a town in the state of Michoacán, Mexico, which is the main settlement of Huiramba Municipality. In 2011 it had 3,307 inhabitants.
