= Huiramba Municipality =

Coordinates: 19.527°N 101.451°W

Huiramba
- Municipality
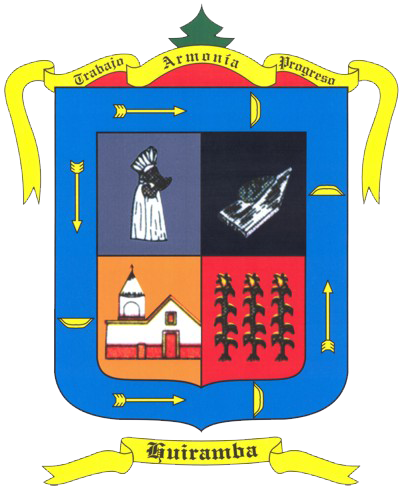
- Coat of arms

- Location in Mexico Huiramba (Mexico)
- Country: Mexico
- State: Michoacán
- Demonym: (in Spanish)
- Time zone: UTC−6 (CST)

Huiramba is a municipality in the Mexican state of Michoacán. The central settlement is also called Huiramba, and the municipality includes the localities El Pedregal, El Refugio, El Sauz, La Presa, La Reunión, Las Trojes, Los Cerritos and Tupátaro.

== See also ==
- Municipalities of Michoacán
