= Taretan =

Coordinates: 19°20′N 101°55′W

- Municipality
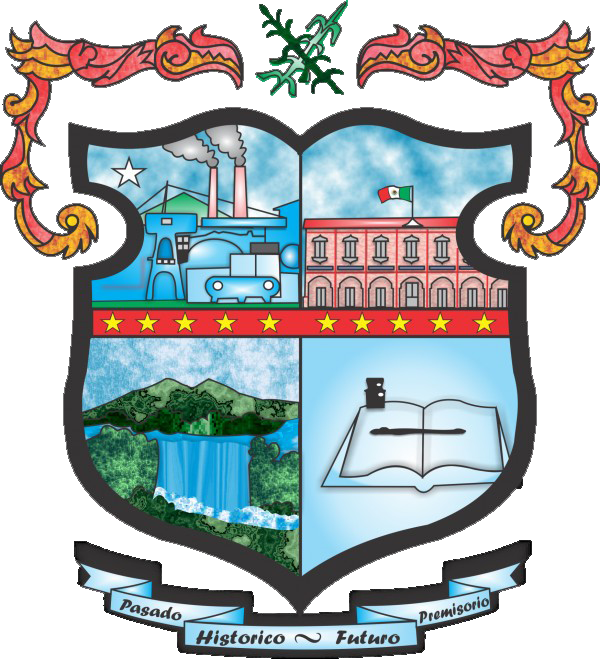
- Coat of arms

- Location in Mexico Taretan (Mexico)
- Country: Mexico
- State: Michoacán
- Demonym: (in Spanish)
- Time zone: UTC−6 (CST)

Taretan is a municipality located in the central part of the Mexican state of Michoacán. The municipality has an area of 185.23 square kilometres (0.56% of the surface of the state) and is bordered to the north by the municipality of Ziracuaretiro, to the east by Salvador Escalante and Ario, to the south by Gabriel Zamora and Nuevo Urecho, and to the west by Uruapan The municipality had a population of 12,294 inhabitants according to the 2005 census. Its municipal seat is the city of the same name.

== Sister cities ==
The city of Taretan is twinned with 2 cities around the world.

- Uión de Reyes, Cuba (2007)
- Matanzas, Cuba (2009)
