= Numarán =

- Town
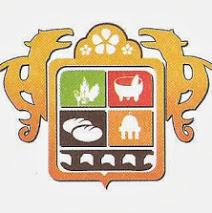
- Coat of arms

- Location in Mexico
- Coordinates: 20°15′21″N 101°56′53″W
- Country: Mexico
- State: Michoacán
- Municipality: Numarán

Population (2010)
  - Total: 9,794

Numarán is a town and seat of the municipality of the same name, in the central Mexican state of Michoacán. As of 2010, the town had a population of 9,794.

== See also ==
- Municipalities of Michoacán
