= Tepalcatepec =

Tepalcatepec Tepeque
- City and municipality
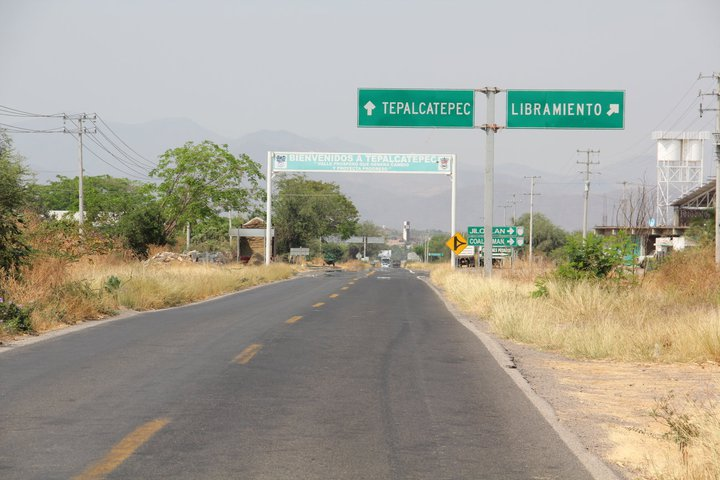

- Location within Michoacán
- Coordinates: 19°11′N 102°51′W
- Country: Mexico
- State: Michoacán
- Region: Tierra Caliente

Population (2010)
  - City and municipality: 42,879
  - Metro: 34,568
- Time zone: UTC-6 (Zona Centro)

Tepalcatepec, also known as Tepeque, is a city and its surrounding municipality in the Mexican state of Michoacán. It is located in the state's southwestern Tierra Caliente region, bordering the state of Jalisco to the north and west.

== Population ==
The total population of Tepalcatepec in 2010 was 34,568, and the total population of the municipality was 42,879.

== Violence ==
María Guadalupe López Esquivel, a.k.a. "La Catrina", 21, leader of the Jalisco New Generation Cartel (CJNG) in Tepalcatepec, was killed in a gun battle with state and federal security forces in the area in January 2020.

Serving municipal president Martha Laura Mendoza Mendoza and her husband were murdered by gunmen outside their home in Tepalcatepec on 17 June 2025.

The Cártel de Tepalcatepec was founded in the area.

== Fauna ==
The Michoacán club-tail iguana (Ctenosaura clarki) is endemic to Tepalcatepec. The habitat of this species is dry, hot, cactus-covered rocky hillsides.

== Notable people ==
- Diego Casillas (born 1994) – footballer
