= Aquila, Michoacán =

Town in Michoacán, Mexico

Coordinates: 18°35′N 103°31′W

Aquila
- Municipality

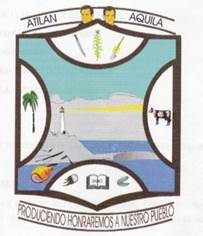
- Coat of arms

- Location in Mexico Aquila (Mexico)
- Country: Mexico
- State: Michoacán

Population (2020)
  - Municipality: 24,676
- Demonym: (in Spanish)
- Time zone: UTC−6 (CST)

Aquila (Spanish pronunciation: [aˈkila]) is a town in the southwest part of the Mexican state of Michoacán. It is the municipal seat for the municipality of Aquila. It is 23 mi/43 km southeast of Tecoman. Its population was 1,915 in 2002. It is located at Latitude: 18°35'N Longitude: 103°31'W and at elevation 989 ft/510 m. It has harsh terrain. Agriculture consists of small farming, mainly for subsistence. There is one paved road south to Mexico Highway 200 (5 mi/11 km away).

== Notable residents ==
- Zenaida Pulido (1976–2019), activist.
