= 4th federal electoral district of Michoacán =

Federal electoral district of Mexico

Michoacán's 4th
- Electoral district of the Chamber of Deputies of Mexico

- 4th district since 2023

Incumbent
- Member: Rosa Guadalupe Ortega
- Party: ▌Morena
- Congress: 66th (2024–2027)

District
- State: Michoacán
- Head town: Jiquilpan de Juárez
- Coordinates: 19°59′N 102°43′W
- Covers: 15 municipalities: Briseñas, Chavinda, Cojumatlán, Cotija, Jacona, Jiquilpan, Marcos Castellanos, Pajacuarán, Sahuayo, Tangamandapio, Tingüindín, Tocumbo, Venustiano Carranza, Villamar, Vista Hermosa
- PR region: Fifth
- Precincts: 273
- Population: 391,037 (2020 census)

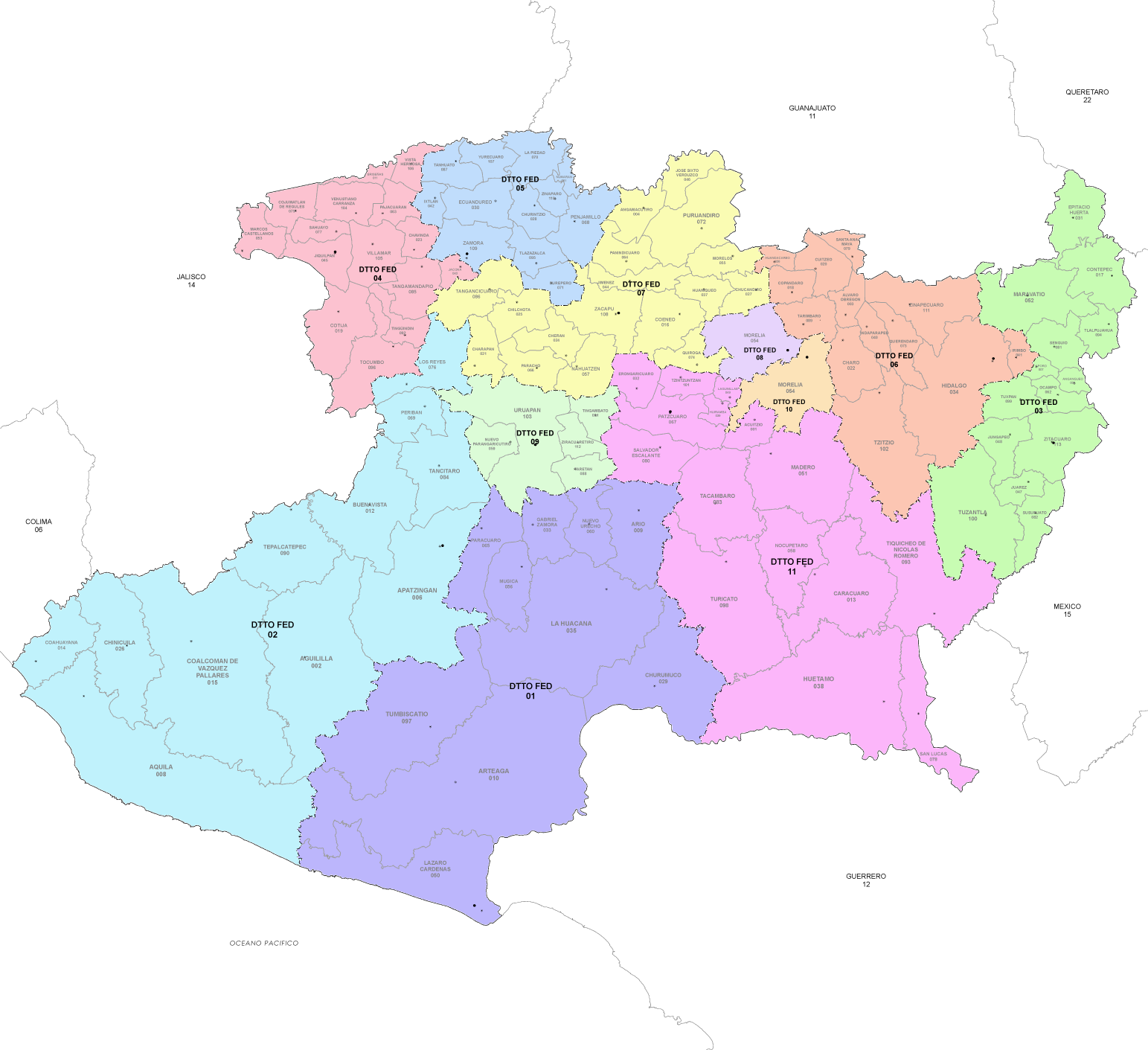
Michoacán's federal electoral districts since 2023

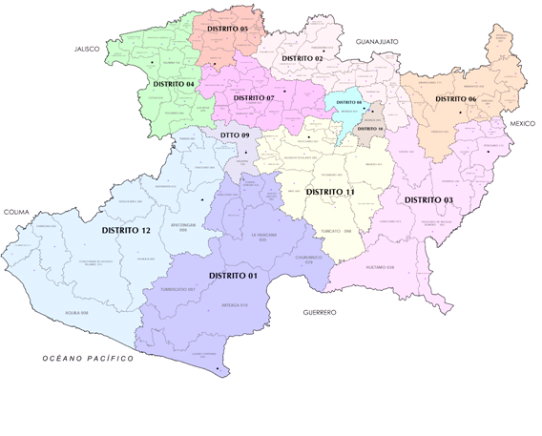
Michoacán under the 2017–2022 districting scheme

The 4th federal electoral district of Michoacán (Spanish: Distrito electoral federal 04 de Michoacán) is one of the 300 electoral districts into which Mexico is divided for elections to the federal Chamber of Deputies and one of 11 such districts in the state of Michoacán.

It elects one deputy to the lower house of Congress for each three-year legislative session by means of the first-past-the-post system. Votes cast in the district also count towards the calculation of proportional representation ("plurinominal") deputies elected from the fifth region.

The current member for the district, elected in the 2024 general election, is Rosa Guadalupe Ortega Tiburcio of the National Regeneration Movement (Morena).

== District territory ==
Michoacán lost its 12th district in the 2023 districting process carried out by the National Electoral Institute (INE). Under the new districting plan, which is to be used for the 2024, 2027 and 2030 federal elections, the 4th district covers 273 precincts (secciones electorales) across 15 municipalities in the north-west of the state:

- Briseñas, Chavinda, Cojumatlán, Cotija, Jacona, Jiquilpan, Marcos Castellanos, Pajacuarán, Sahuayo, Tangamandapio, Tingüindín, Tocumbo, Venustiano Carranza, Villamar and Vista Hermosa.

The head town (cabecera distrital), where results from individual polling stations are gathered together and tallied, is the city of Jiquilpan de Juárez. The district reported a population of 391,037 in the 2020 census.

== Previous districting schemes ==
Evolution of electoral district numbers
| | 1974 | 1978 | 1996 | 2005 | 2017 | 2023 |
|---|---|---|---|---|---|---|
| Michoacán | 9 | 13 | 13 | 12 | 12 | 11 |
| Chamber of Deputies | 196 | 300 | | | | |

2017–2022

Between 2017 and 2022, the district covered practically the same area as in the 2023 plan: it included the municipality of Los Reyes but did not include Jacona. Jiquilpan was the head town.

2005–2017

Under the 2005 districting plan, Michoacán lost its 13th district. The 4th district's head town was at Jiquilpan and it covered 14 municipalities. The differences from the 2023 plan were the exclusion of Pajacuarán and Vista Hermosa and the inclusion of Ixtlán.

1996–2005

Under the 1996 districting plan, the district's head town was at Jiquilpan and it covered 13 municipalities in that region of the state. The configuration was broadly the same as the 2023 plan: Briseñas, Chavinda, Jacona and Tangamandapío were not included, while Peribán and Los Reyes were.

1978–1996

The districting scheme in force from 1978 to 1996 was the result of the 1977 electoral reforms, which increased the number of single-member seats in the Chamber of Deputies from 196 to 300. Under the reforms, Michoacán's allocation rose from 9 to 13. The 4th district's head town was at La Piedad and it covered nine municipalities in the north of the state: Angamacutiro, Churintzio, José Sixto Verduzco, La Piedad, Numarán, Panindícuaro, Penjamillo, Puruándiro and Zináparo.

== Deputies returned to Congress ==
(Mexico) National parties
- Current
- PAN
- PRI
- PT
- PVEM
- MC
- Morena
- PAZ
- Somos
- Defunct or local only
- PLM
- PNR
- PRM
- PNM
- PP
- PPS
- PARM
- PFCRN
- CON
- PANAL
- PSD
- PES
- PES
- PRD

Michoacán's 4th district
| Election | Deputy | Party | Term | Legislature |
|---|---|---|---|---|
| 1916 | Salvador Herrejón; Uriel Áviles | | 1916–1917 | Constituent Congress of Querétaro |
...
| 1979 | Humberto Romero Pérez | Institutional Revolutionary Party | 1979–1982 | 51st Congress |
| 1982 | Hermenegildo Anguiano Martínez | Institutional Revolutionary Party | 1982–1985 | 52nd Congress |
| 1985 | José Berber Sánchez | Institutional Revolutionary Party | 1985–1988 | 53rd Congress |
| 1988 | Alfredo Torres Robledo | | 1988–1991 | 54th Congress |
| 1991 | Eduardo Villaseñor Peña (Note: Villaseñor Peña resigned his seat in 1992 to run for governor of Michoacán. He won the election, was sworn in as governor, but stepped down 21 days into his term of office because of post-election conflicts.); Efraín Zavala Cisneros | Institutional Revolutionary Party | 1991–1992; 1992–1994 | 55th Congress |
| 1994 | Jaime Rodríguez López | Institutional Revolutionary Party | 1994–1997 | 56th Congress |
| 1997 | Abraham González Negrete | Institutional Revolutionary Party | 1997–2000 | 57th Congress |
| 2000 | Francisco Javier Ortiz Esquivel | National Action Party (Mexico) | 2000–2003 | 58th Congress |
| 2003 | Miguel Amezcua Alejo | Institutional Revolutionary Party | 2003–2006 | 59th Congress |
| 2006 | Felipe Díaz Garibay | National Action Party (Mexico) | 2006–2009 | 60th Congress |
| 2009 | Ricardo Sánchez Gálvez | National Action Party (Mexico) | 2009–2012 | 61st Congress |
| 2012 | Salvador Romero Valencia | National Action Party (Mexico) | 2012–2015 | 62nd Congress |
| 2015 | Alfredo Anaya Orozco | Institutional Revolutionary Party | 2015–2018 | 63rd Congress |
| 2018 | Armando Tejeda Cid | Institutional Revolutionary Party | 2018–2021 | 64th Congress |
| 2021 | Rodrigo Sánchez Zepeda | National Action Party (Mexico) | 2021–2024 | 65th Congress |
| 2024 | Rosa Guadalupe Ortega Tiburcio | National Regeneration Movement | 2024–2027 | 66th Congress |

== Presidential elections ==
Michoacán's 4th district
| Election | District won by | Party or coalition | % |
|---|---|---|---|
| 2018 | Andrés Manuel López Obrador | Juntos Haremos Historia | 42.8608 |
| 2024 | Claudia Sheinbaum Pardo | Sigamos Haciendo Historia | 51.7341 |
