= 12th federal electoral district of Michoacán =

Defunct federal electoral district of Mexico

Coordinates: 19°05′N 102°21′W

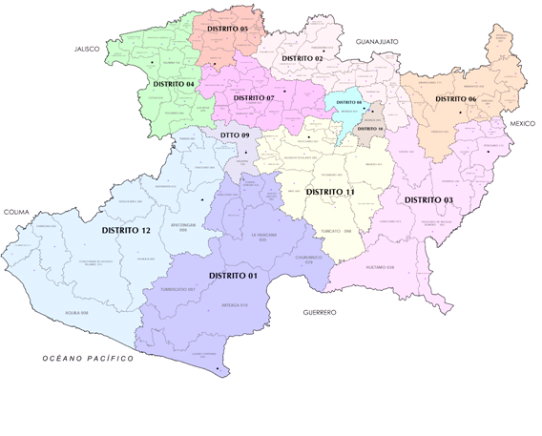
Michoacán under the 2017–2022 districting scheme; the 12th district is in the south-west of the state.

The 12th federal electoral district of Michoacán (Spanish: Distrito electoral federal 12 de Michoacán) is a defunct federal electoral district of the Mexican state of Michoacán.

During its existence, the 12th district returned one deputy to the lower house of Congress for each legislative session by means of the first-past-the-post system. From 1979 onwards, votes cast in the district also counted towards the calculation of proportional representation ("plurinominal") deputies elected from the country's electoral regions.

Suspended in 1930, (Note: An amendment to Article 52 of the Constitution in 1928 changed the original provision of "one deputy per 60,000 inhabitants" to "one deputy per 100,000"; as a result, the size of the Chamber of Deputies fell from 281 in the 1928 election to 171 in 1934.) it was re-established as part of the 1977 political reforms. The restored 12th district was first contested in the 1979 mid-term election and it elected its final deputy in the 2021 mid-terms. It was dissolved by the National Electoral Institute (INE) in its 2023 redistricting process because the state's population no longer warranted 12 districts.

== District territory ==
Evolution of electoral district numbers
	1974	1978	1996	2005	2017	2023
Michoacán	9	13	13	12	12	11
Chamber of Deputies	196	300				

2017–2022

In its final form, the 12th district covered 11 municipalities in the south-west of the state:
- Aguililla, Apatzingán, Aquila, Buenavista, Coahuayana, Coalcomán, Chinicuila, Nuevo Parangaricutiro, Peribán, Tancítaro and Tepalcatepec.
The district's head town (cabecera distrital), where results from individual polling stations were gathered together and tallied, was the city of Apatzingán de la Constitución.

2005–2017

Under the 2005 districting plan, Michoacán lost its 13th district. Between 2005 and 2017, the 12th district had the same configuration as under the 2017 scheme.

1996–2005

Under the 1996 districting scheme, the district's head town was at Apatzingán but its configuration was different:
- Aguililla, Apatzingán, Buenavista and Tancítaro, as in the later plans, plus Gabriel Zamora, La Huacana, Múgica, Nuevo Urecho and Parácuaro.

1978–1996

The districting scheme in force from 1978 to 1996 was the result of the 1977 electoral reforms, which increased the number of single-member seats in the Chamber of Deputies from 196 to 300. Under the reforms, Michoacán's allocation rose from 9 to 13. The 12th district's head town was at Los Reyes and it comprised 11 municipalities:
- Charapan, Chilchota, Paracho, Peribán, Purépero, Los Reyes, Tancítaro, Tangancícuaro, Tinguindín, Tlazazalca and Tocumbo.

== Deputies returned to Congress ==
(Mexico) National parties
- Current
- PAN
- PRI
- PT
- PVEM
- MC
- Morena
- Defunct or local only
- PLM
- PNR
- PRM
- PNM
- PP
- PPS
- PARM
- PFCRN
- Convergencia
- PANAL
- PSD
- PES
- PES
- PRD

Michoacán's 12th district
Election	Deputy	Party	Term	Legislature
1916	José Silva Herrera		1916–1917	Constituent Congress of Querétaro
1917	José Silva Herrera		1917–1918	27th Congress
1918	José Silva Herrera		1918–1920	28th Congress
1920	Rafael M. González		1920–1922	29th Congress
1922	Alfredo Álvarez Treviño		1922–1924	30th Congress
1924	Alfredo Álvarez Treviño		1924–1926	31st Congress
1926	Silviano Hurtado		1926–1928	32nd Congress
1928	Silviano Hurtado		1928–1930	33rd Congress
The 12th district was suspended between 1930 and 1979
1979	Abimael López Castillo	Institutional Revolutionary Party	1979–1982	51st Congress
1982	José Cervantes Acosta	Institutional Revolutionary Party	1982–1985	52nd Congress
1985	Leonel Villalobos Chávez	Institutional Revolutionary Party	1985–1988	53rd Congress
1988	Isidro Aguilera Ortiz	Party of the Cardenist Front of National Reconstruction	1988–1991	54th Congress
1991	Medardo Méndez Alfaro	Institutional Revolutionary Party	1991–1994	55th Congress
1994	Víctor Silva Tejeda	Institutional Revolutionary Party	1994–1997	56th Congress
1997	Lázaro Cárdenas Batel	Party of the Democratic Revolution	1997–2000	57th Congress
2000	Cuauhtémoc Montero Esquivel	Party of the Democratic Revolution	2000–2003	58th Congress
2003	Inelvo Moreno Álvarez	Party of the Democratic Revolution	2003–2006	59th Congress
2006	Irineo Mendoza Mendoza	Party of the Democratic Revolution	2006–2009	60th Congress
2009	José María Valencia Barajas	Party of the Democratic Revolution	2009–2012	61st Congress
2012	Salvador Ortiz García	Institutional Revolutionary Party	2012–2015	62nd Congress
2015	Omar Noé Bernardino Vargas	Ecologist Green Party of Mexico	2015–2018	63rd Congress
2018	Francisco Javier Huacus Esquivel	Labour Party (Mexico)	2018–2021	64th Congress
2021	Francisco Javier Huacus Esquivel (Note: Huacus Esquivel was elected on the PT ticket but switched allegiance to the PRD in August 2021.)	Labour Party (Mexico) Party of the Democratic Revolution	2021–2024	65th Congress

== Presidential elections ==
Michoacán's 12th district
Election	District won by	Party or coalition	%
2018	Andrés Manuel López Obrador	Juntos Haremos Historia	55.2241
