= 2nd federal electoral district of Michoacán =

Federal electoral district of Mexico

Michoacán's 2nd
- Electoral district of the Chamber of Deputies of Mexico

- 2nd district since 2023

Incumbent
- Member: José Luis Cruz Lucatero
- Party: ▌Morena
- Congress: 66th (2024–2027)

District
- State: Michoacán
- Head town: Apatzingán de la Constitución
- Coordinates: 19°05′N 102°21′W
- Covers: 11 municipalities: Aguililla, Apatzingán, Aquila, Buenavista, Chinicuila, Coahuayana, Coalcomán de Vázquez Pallares, Los Reyes, Peribán, Tancítaro, Tepalcatepec
- PR region: Fifth
- Precincts: 245
- Population: 418,465 (2020 census)

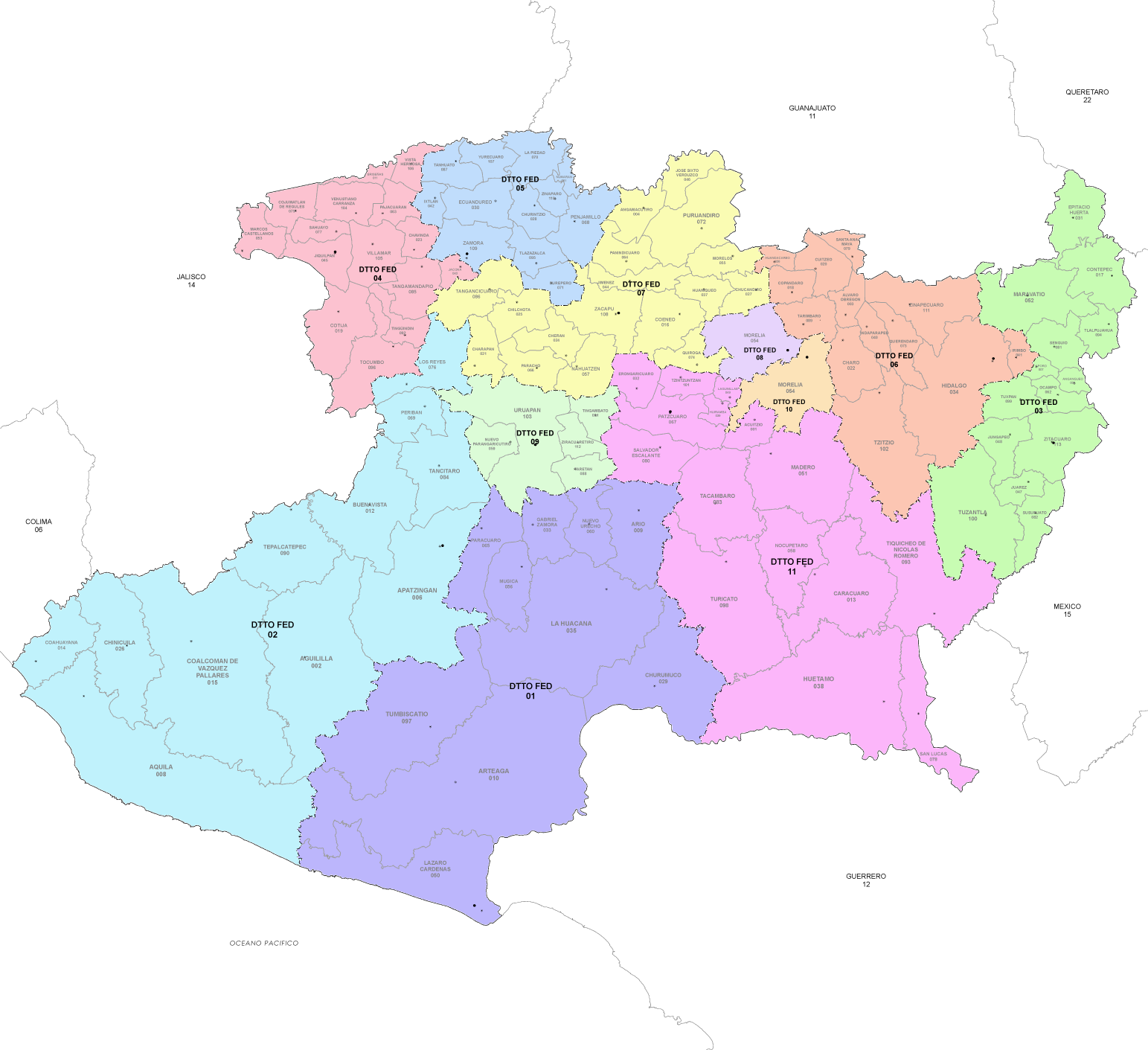
Michoacán's federal electoral districts since 2023

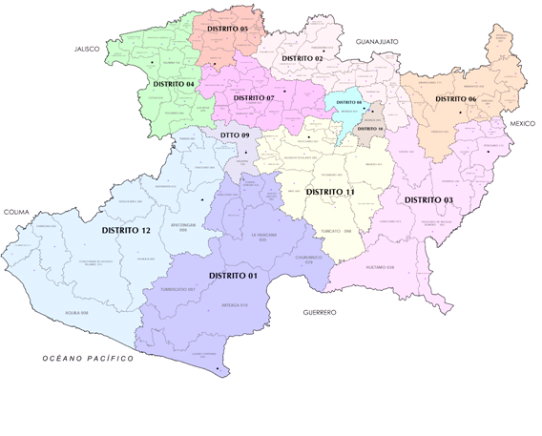
Michoacán under the 2017–2022 districting scheme

The 2nd federal electoral district of Michoacán (Spanish: Distrito electoral federal 02 de Michoacán) is one of the 300 electoral districts into which Mexico is divided for elections to the federal Chamber of Deputies and one of 11 such districts in the state of Michoacán.

It elects one deputy to the lower house of Congress for each three-year legislative session by means of the first-past-the-post system. Votes cast in the district also count towards the calculation of proportional representation ("plurinominal") deputies elected from the fifth region.

The current member for the district, elected in the 2024 general election, is José Luis Cruz Lucatero of the National Regeneration Movement (Morena).

== District territory ==
Michoacán lost its 12th district in the 2023 districting process carried out by the National Electoral Institute (INE). Under the new districting plan, which is to be used for the 2024, 2027 and 2030 federal elections, the 2nd district covers 245 precincts (secciones electorales) across 11 municipalities in the south-west of the state:

- Aguililla, Apatzingán, Aquila, Buenavista, Chinicuila, Coahuayana, Coalcomán de Vázquez Pallares, Los Reyes, Peribán, Tancítaro and Tepalcatepec.

The head town (cabecera distrital), where results from individual polling stations are gathered together and tallied, is the city of Apatzingán de la Constitución. The district reported a population of 418,465 in the 2020 census.

== Previous districting schemes ==
Evolution of electoral district numbers
	1974	1978	1996	2005	2017	2023
Michoacán	9	13	13	12	12	11
Chamber of Deputies	196	300				

2017–2022

Between 2017 and 2022, the district was located in the north of the state. Its head town was at Puruándiro and it comprised 17 municipalities:
- Álvaro Obregón, Angamacutiro, Copándaro, Cuitzeo, Charo, Chucándiro, Huandacareo, Huaniqueo, Indaparapeo, Jiménez, José Sixto Verduzco, Morelos, Panindícuaro, Penjamillo, Puruándiro, Santa Ana Maya and Tarímbaro.

2005–2017

Under the 2005 districting plan, Michoacán lost its 13th district. The 2nd district's head town was at Puruándiro and it covered 19 municipalities:
- Álvaro Obregón, Angamacutiro, Chucándiro, Churintzio, Copándaro, Cuitzeo, Huandacareo, Huaniqueo, Jiménez, José Sixto Verduzco, Morelos, Numarán, Panindícuaro, Penjamillo, Puruándiro, Santa Ana Maya, Tarímbaro, Tlazazalca and Zináparo.

1996–2005

Under the 1996 districting plan, the district's head town was at Puruándiro and it covered 12 municipalities in that region of the state:
- Álvaro Obregón, Angamacutiro, Chucándiro, Copándaro, Cuitzeo, Huandacareo, José Sixto Verduzco, Morelos, Panindícuaro, Puruándiro, Santa Ana Maya and Tarímbaro.

1978–1996

The districting scheme in force from 1978 to 1996 was the result of the 1977 electoral reforms, which increased the number of single-member seats in the Chamber of Deputies from 196 to 300. Under the reforms, Michoacán's allocation rose from 9 to 13. The 2nd district's head town was at Ciudad Hidalgo – east of the state capital, Morelia – and it covered 12 municipalities:
- Charo, Hidalgo, Indaparapeo, Irimbo, Juárez, Jungapeo, Queréndaro, Susupuato, Tuxpan, Tuzantla, Tzitzio and Zinapécuaro.

== Deputies returned to Congress ==
(Mexico) National parties
- Current
- PAN
- PRI
- PT
- PVEM
- MC
- Morena
- PAZ
- Somos
- Defunct or local only
- PLM
- PNR
- PRM
- PNM
- PP
- PPS
- PARM
- PFCRN
- CON
- PANAL
- PSD
- PES
- PES
- PRD

Michoacán's 2nd district
Election	Deputy	Party	Term	Legislature
1916	Alberto Peralta		1916–1917	Constituent Congress of Querétaro
...
1979	José Luis Lemus Solís	Institutional Revolutionary Party	1979–1982	51st Congress
1982	Jorge Canedo Vargas	Institutional Revolutionary Party	1982–1985	52nd Congress
1985	Antonio Correa López	Institutional Revolutionary Party	1985–1988	53rd Congress
1988	Humberto Urquiza Marín	Popular Socialist Party (Mexico)	1988–1991	54th Congress
1991	Julián Rodríguez Sesmas	Institutional Revolutionary Party	1991–1994	55th Congress
1994	Carmen Soto Correa	Institutional Revolutionary Party	1994–1997	56th Congress
1997	Julieta Gallardo Mora	Party of the Democratic Revolution	1997–2000	57th Congress
2000	Manuel Duarte Ramírez	Party of the Democratic Revolution	2000–2003	58th Congress
2003	Enrique Torres Cuadros	Party of the Democratic Revolution	2003–2006	59th Congress
2006	Rafael Villicaña García	Party of the Democratic Revolution	2006–2009	60th Congress
2009	José Marciano Torres Robledo	Party of the Democratic Revolution	2009–2012	61st Congress
2012	Armando Contreras Ceballos	Party of the Democratic Revolution	2012–2015	62nd Congress
2015	Erik Juárez Blanquet	Party of the Democratic Revolution	2015–2018	63rd Congress
2018	Esteban Barajas Barajas	National Regeneration Movement	2018–2021	64th Congress
2021	Mauricio Prieto Gómez	Party of the Democratic Revolution	2021–2024	65th Congress
2024	José Luis Cruz Lucatero	National Regeneration Movement	2024–2027	66th Congress

== Presidential elections ==
Michoacán's 2nd district
Election	District won by	Party or coalition	%
2018	Andrés Manuel López Obrador	Juntos Haremos Historia	43.1360
2024	Claudia Sheinbaum Pardo	Sigamos Haciendo Historia	55.7401
