= TV Rey =

Mexican telecommunications provider company

TV Rey de Occidente S.A. de C.V.
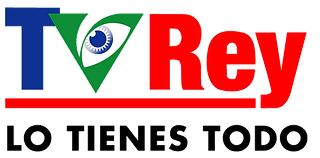
- Industry: Telecommunications
- Founded: 1995; 31 years ago
- Headquarters: Sahuayo, Michoacán, Mexico
- Area served: Jalisco; Michoacán; Querétaro
- Products: Cable, Fixed telephony, Internet service provider
- Website: www.tvrey.mx

TV Rey de Occidente S.A. de C.V. or simplified TV Rey, is a Mexican telecommunications company in the triple play, has a presence in Western Mexico, covering the south of Jalisco, Central-West Michoacán and Querétaro.

== History ==
The company began operations in 1995 in Sahuayo, Michoacán, starting as a cable television provider, between 2005 and 2008 it would enter the fixed telephony market, at that time they would expand to the center-west of Michoacán, in 2010 they would enter the Internet service market on those dates it would install its branches in Querétaro, in total having coverage in three states.

== Services and subsidiaries ==
The company offers Internet services at 10 to 100 mbps, including cable television and fixed telephony, also includes business package.

=== Subsidiaries ===
- Ilox Telecomunicaciones
- ONtv
- TV Net
- TV 5
- TV Phone

== Coverage ==
- Michoacán
  - Sahuayo de Morelos
  - Jiquilpan de Juárez
  - Cojumatlán de Régules
  - San Pedro Cahro
  - Pajacuarán
  - San José de Gracia
  - Guarachita
  - Cumuatillo
- Jalisco
  - Zapopan, Guadalajara
  - Mazamitla
  - Tizapan el Alto
- Querétaro
  - San Juan del Río
  - Ezequiel Montes
  - Bernal

== See also ==
- izzi Telecom
- Totalplay
- Megacable
