= Nuestra Belleza Michoacán 2010 =

- Date: June 25, 2010
- Venue: Malecón Río Balsas, Lázaro Cárdenas, Michoacán
- Broadcaster: Televisa
- Entrants: 10
- Placements: 4
- Winner: Karla Paulina Gutiérrez"'Victoria Sanchez Elizalde Romo"'

Nuestra Belleza Michoacán 2010, was held in Malecón Río Balsas, Lázaro Cárdenas, Michoacán, Mexico on June 25, 2010. At the conclusion of the final night of competition, Karla Paulina Gutiérrez of Morelia and Victoria Sánchez Elizalde Romo of Pátzcuaro were crowned the winners. Gutiérrez and Sánchez were crowned by outgoing Nuestra Belleza Michoacán titleholder, Itzel García. Ten contestants competed for the state title.

== Results ==
=== Placements ===
| Final results | Contestant |
|---|---|
| Nuestra Belleza Michoacán 2010 | Karla Paulina Gutiérrez; Victoria Sanchez Elizalde Romo |
| Suplente / 1st Runner-up | Paola Arias |
| 2nd Runner-up | Mónica Zavala |

== Judges ==
- Arturo Jiménez Cardona - Fashion Designer
- Gabriela Carbajal - National Coordinator of Nuestra Belleza México
- Carlo Antonio Rico - Producer of Televisa
- Alma Angélica de la Madrid

== Background music ==
- Fey

== Contestants ==
| Hometown | Conestant |
|---|---|
| Apatzingán | Carmen Yajhaira Sánchez Valencia |
| Lázaro Cárdenas | Pilar García Mendoza |
| Los Reyes | Paola Susana González Ceja |
| Los Reyes | Paola Arias González |
| Morelia | Karla Paulina Gutiérrez García |
| Peribán | Margarita Alejandra Ureña Morelos |
| Pátzcuaro | Victoria Sánchez Elizalde Romo |
| Sahuayo | María de Jesús Álvarez Álvarez |
| Uruapan | Mónica Zavala García |
| Yurécuaro | Mariana Villanueva Ochoa |
