= José Sixto Verduzco Municipality =

- Municipality
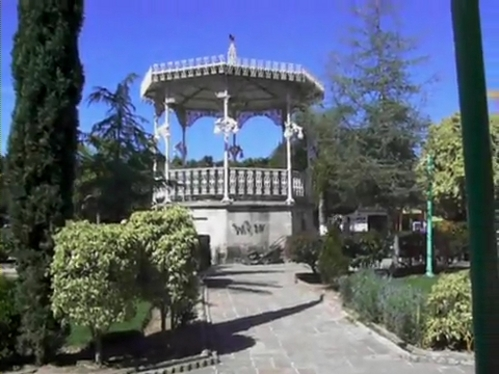
- Kiosk in Pastor Ortiz

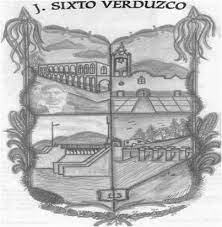
- Coat of arms

- Coordinates: 20°16′30″N 101°33′52″W
- Country: Mexico
- State: Michoacán
- Municipal seat: Pastor Ortiz

Area
  - Total: 220 km^{2} (85 sq mi)

Population (2020)
  - Total: 26,213
- Time zone: UTC-6 (Zona Centro)
- Website: josesixtoverduzco.gob.mx

José Sixto Verduzco is a municipality in northern Michoacán. It is part of the Bajío region. In the 2020 INEGI census, it reported 26,213 inhabitants. The seat is at Pastor Ortiz.

It is named for José Sixto Verduzco, one of the signatories of the 1813 Solemn Act of the Declaration of Independence of Northern America. The municipality was created in 1974.

== Geography ==
It is bordered to the north by Guanajuato (Huanimaro and Abasolo municipalities), to the east and south by Puruándiro, Michoacán, and to the west by Pénjamo and Angamacutiro (Mich.).
