= Salvador Romero Valencia =

Mexican businessman and politician

- Born: 30 October 1960 (age 65); Jiquilpan de Juárez, Michoacán, Mexico
- Other name: Chavo Romero
- Education: University of Guadalajara
- Occupation: Business
- Website: www.salvadorromero.mx

Salvador Romero Valencia (born 30 October 1960) is a former Mexican politician previously affiliated with the Institutional Revolutionary Party (PRI). In the 2012 general election he was elected to the Chamber of Deputies to represent Michoacán's fourth district (Jiquilpan) during the 62nd session of Congress (2012–2015). Romero Valencia decided to retire from politics following his term in office and is now fully dedicated to his business affairs.
