= Cuadros (surname) =

Cuadros is a surname. Notable people with the surname include:

- Álvaro Cuadros (born 1995), Spanish cyclist
- Diego Cuadros (born 1996), Colombian soccer player
- Enrique Torres Cuadros (born 1957), Mexican politician
- Gil Cuadros (1962–1996), American gay Latino poet, essayist, and ceramist
- Héctor Cuadros (born 1983), Mexican soccer player
- Karielys Cuadros (born 1996), Venezuelan beauty pageant titleholder
- Manuel Rodríguez Cuadros (born 1949), Peruvian diplomat
