= Ricardo Sanchez (disambiguation) =

Ricardo Sanchez (born 1953) is a retired United States Army lieutenant general.

Ricardo Sanchez or Sánchez may also refer to:

- Ricardo Sánchez (poet) (1941–1995), Chicano poet
- Ricardo Sanchez (journalist) (born 1958), Cuban–American journalist, radio host, and author
- Ricardo Sanchez (musician) (born 1967), American musician
- Ricardo Sánchez (water polo) (born 1971), Spanish water polo player
- Ricardo Sánchez Gálvez (born 1974), Mexican politician
- Ricardo Sánchez (footballer) (born 1982), Mexican soccer player
- Ricardo Sánchez Mujica (born 1983), Venezuelan politician and former student leader
- Ricky Sánchez (born 1987), Puerto Rican professional basketball player
- Ricardo Sánchez (field hockey) (born 1992), Spanish field hockey player
- Richard Sánchez (Paraguayan footballer) (born 1996), Paraguayan footballer
- Ricardo Sánchez (baseball) (born 1997), baseball player

== See also ==
- Richard Sánchez (disambiguation)
