= Erik Juárez Blanquet =

Mexican teacher and politician (1980–2020)

Erik Juárez Blanquet (October 29, 1980 – March 10, 2020) was a Mexican state deputy serving in the Congress of Michoacán when he was assassinated. He was also a lawyer and former member of the Party of the Democratic Revolution (PRD), but independent at the time of his death. He served as the municipal president of Angamacutiro, Michoacán, from 2008 to 2011. Juárez was then elected to the federal Chamber of Deputies, where he represented Michoacán's second district from September 1, 2015, until April 12, 2018. He briefly returned to the Chamber of Deputies from July 6, 2018, to August 31, 2018.

On March 10, 2020, Erik Juárez Blanquet was shot and killed by assailants while he was a passenger in truck driving on Avenida Morelos Norte in Morelia, Michoacán. The two attackers approached Juárez's truck on motorcycles and shot him at least five times, before escaping and abandoning the motorcycle. They were later captured.
