= San José de Gracia, Michoacán =

Town in Michoacán de Ocampo, Mexico

San José de Gracia Ornelas
- Town
- Interactive map of San José de Gracia
- Coordinates: 19.9892°N 103.0256°W
- Country: Mexico
- State: Michoacán de Ocampo
- Municipality: Marcos Castellanos

Area
  - Total: 231 km^{2} (89 sq mi)

San José de Gracia is a town in the Mexican state of Michoacán de Ocampo, located in the extreme northeast of the state. It is the municipal seat of the municipality of Marcos Castellanos. The area of San José de Gracia is approximately 231 square kilometers. It is located at the intersection of the 20th parallel and the 103rd meridian. It is sometimes referred to as Ornelas Michoacan. It is a producer of dairy products, including cheeses, cream, and milk.

== History ==
In approximately 1886, inhabitants of the cattle ranch of Llano de la Cruz began to plan the founding of a formal town under the leadership of Deacon Esteban Zepeda. On March 19, 1888, José Maria Cázares y Martínez, the Bishop of Zamora, provided official authorization and the town was given the name San José for the day that it was founded. In 1909, the town became part of the municipality of Sahuayo and came to form part of Jiquilpan under a policy of tenancy. It was officially named Ornelas, though this designation never caught on.

On June 11, 1927, approximately 500 men took up arms in San José de Gracia as part of the Cristero War, a response to the federal army previously setting fire to the town.

On January 30, 1967, the town was made the municipal seat of the Municipality of Marcos Catellanos.

In 1972, Mexican author Luis González y González published a microhistory of the town. The book was translated to English in 1974 as San José de Gracia: Mexican Village in Transition.

In 1981, the Congress of Michoacán issued a decree that restored the name San José de Gracia as the town's official title.
