= Rafael Villicaña García =

Mexican politician

- Born: 26 March 1958 (age 68); Michoacán, Mexico
- Occupation: Politician
- Political party: PRD

Rafael Villicaña García (born 26 March 1958) is a Mexican politician affiliated with the Party of the Democratic Revolution (PRD). In the 2000 general election he was elected to the Chamber of Deputies to represent Michoacán's second district during the 60th Congress. He had previously served as municipal president of Puruándiro on three occasions: in 1992, in 1996–1998 and in 2002–2004.
