= Felipe Díaz Garibay =

Mexican politician

- Born: 23 July 1961 (age 64); Jiquilpan de Juárez, Michoacán, Mexico
- Occupation: Politician
- Political party: PAN

Felipe Díaz Garibay (born 23 July 1961) is a Mexican politician affiliated with the National Action Party (PAN). In the 2006 general election he was elected to the Chamber of Deputies to represent Michoacán's fourth district during the 60th Congress.
