= Miguel Amezcua Alejo =

Mexican politician

- Born: 18 May 1968 (age 58); Venustiano Carranza, Michoacán, Mexico
- Occupation: Politician
- Political party: PRI

Miguel Amezcua Alejo (born 18 May 1968) is a Mexican politician affiliated with the Institutional Revolutionary Party (PRI). In the 2003 mid-terms he was elected to the Chamber of Deputies to represent Michoacán's fourth district during the 59th Congress.
