= Guadalupe Campanur Tapia =

Guadalupe Campanur Tapia (1986 - January 16, 2018) was an indigenous Mexican environmental rights activist. She was one of the indigenous leaders of Cherán who mobilize the population to defend the forest against illegal logging. In 2018, she was remembered by the UN Women.

== Biography ==
She was born in Cherán, Michoacán in 1986. People who have met her described her as a joyful person, intelligent, proactive, brave, free, and committed to her community. She was a young activist that fought for the restitution of the territory in Cherán. Her work for the elderly, children, and labourers made her an important figure in her community.

She was the first woman to become a forest ranger in Michoacán and was one of the founders of Ronda Comunitaria, a group with the aim of protecting the community and the forest through different activities such as workshops for the protection of the environment.

In 2011, she was among the indigenous leaders that raised awareness and mobilize the people to protect their forests against illegal logging and she actively participated in the security team by patrolling local forests. They fought against violence and impunity of organized crime in the region.

Her activism helped to remove the local government and created their own governmental system. With this, Cherán became the only town in Mexico self-governed. Though the participation of the locals they decided how to protect themselves and their forests. They created basic government instances, and institute rounds to protect the security of the population and of the forest.

== Death ==
She was killed in Chilchota, Michocán, Mexico, on January 16, 2018. Her body was found in the road of the Meseta Purépecha between kilometers 15 and 16 of the road Carapan-Paracho and showed evidence of sexual torture and strangulation. According to forensic medicine specialists the cause of death was mechanical asphyxiation by strangulation, and revealed that the killing occurred between 26 and 48 hours prior to finding the body.

Through a press release the prosecution informed the public that they did not receive a missing persons report on Guadalupe. They also stated that they were not certain that her death was related with her activism.

Two days after her death, Carolina Lunuen, friend of Guadalupe, expressed herself about the case:

This can be interpreted as a message to intimidate and silence all of us who genuinely fight for life through actions that go further from resistance. It is also a way to terrorize women...

Her death triggered a series of protests demanding gender justice against the femicides in the community of Cherán.
