= Cojumatlán de Régules =

- Municipality
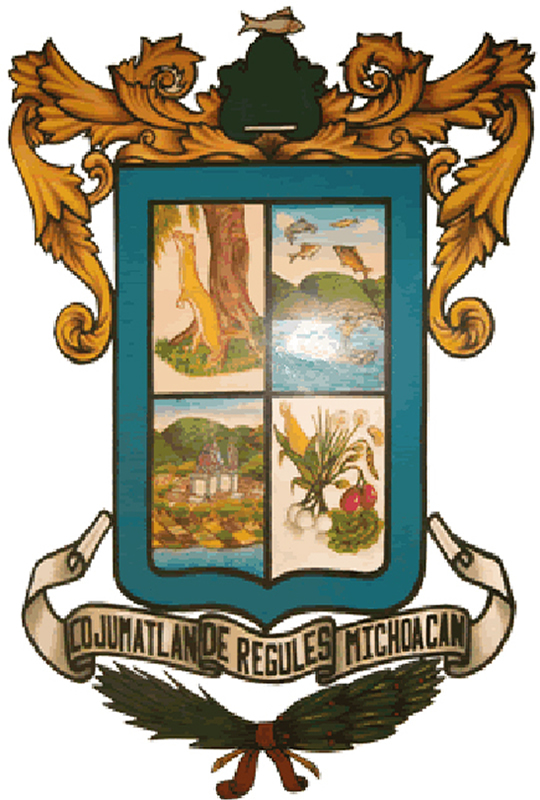
- Coat of arms

- Location of Cojumatlán in Michoacán
- Coordinates: 20°07′06″N 102°51′03″W
- Country: Mexico
- State: Michoacán
- Established: 2 April 1910
- Seat: Cojumatlán de Régules

Government
  - President: Enrique Mújica Sánchez

Area
  - Total: 131.48 km^{2} (50.76 sq mi)
- Elevation (of seat): 1,544 m (5,066 ft)

Population (2010 Census)
  - Total: 9,980
  - Estimate (2015 Intercensal Survey): 10,450
  - Density: 75.9/km^{2} (197/sq mi)
  - Seat: 2,592
- Time zone: UTC-6 (Central)
- Postal codes: 59140–59155
- Area code: 381
- Website: Official website

Cojumatlán de Régules is a municipality in the Mexican state of Michoacán. It is located 180 kilometres (110 mi) west of the state capital of Morelia.

== Geography ==
The municipality of Cojumatlán de Régules is located in the Trans-Mexican Volcanic Belt in northwest Michoacán at an altitude between 1,600 and 2,400 metres (5,200–7,900 ft). It borders the Michoacano municipalities of Venustiano Carranza to the east, Sahuayo to the southeast, Jiquilpan to the south, Marcos Castellanos to the southwest. It also borders Tizapan El Alto in Jalisco to the west, while its northern border runs along the southeastern shore of Lake Chapala, which is administered by the Jaliscan municipality of Poncitlán. The municipality covers an area of 131.48 square kilometres (50.76 sq mi) and comprises 0.2% of the state's area.

Cojumatlán's climate is temperate with rain in the summer. Average temperatures in the municipality range between 16 and 20 °C (61–68 °F), and average annual precipitation ranges between 700 and 1,000 millimetres (28–39 in).

== History ==
The settlement of Cojumatlán was founded in 1531. Its name means "place of weasels", from the Nahuatl word cutzamalí, "weasel". It was incorporated as the municipality of Régules in the district of Jiquilpan on 2 April 1910, taking its name after Nicolás de Régules, a general who fought against the French intervention in Mexico. In 1985 the municipality changed its name to Cojumatlán de Régules.

== Administration ==
The municipal government comprises a president, a councillor (Spanish: síndico), and seven trustees (regidores), four elected by relative majority and three by proportional representation. The current president of the municipality is Enrique Mújica Sánchez.

== Demographics ==
In the 2010 Mexican Census, the municipality of Cojumatlán de Régules recorded a population of 9980 inhabitants living in 2638 households. The 2015 Intercensal Survey estimated a population of 10,450 inhabitants in Cojumatlán.

There are 14 localities in the municipality, of which only the municipal seat, also known as Cojumatlán de Régules, is classified as urban. It recorded a population of 6763 inhabitants in the 2010 Census.

== Economy ==
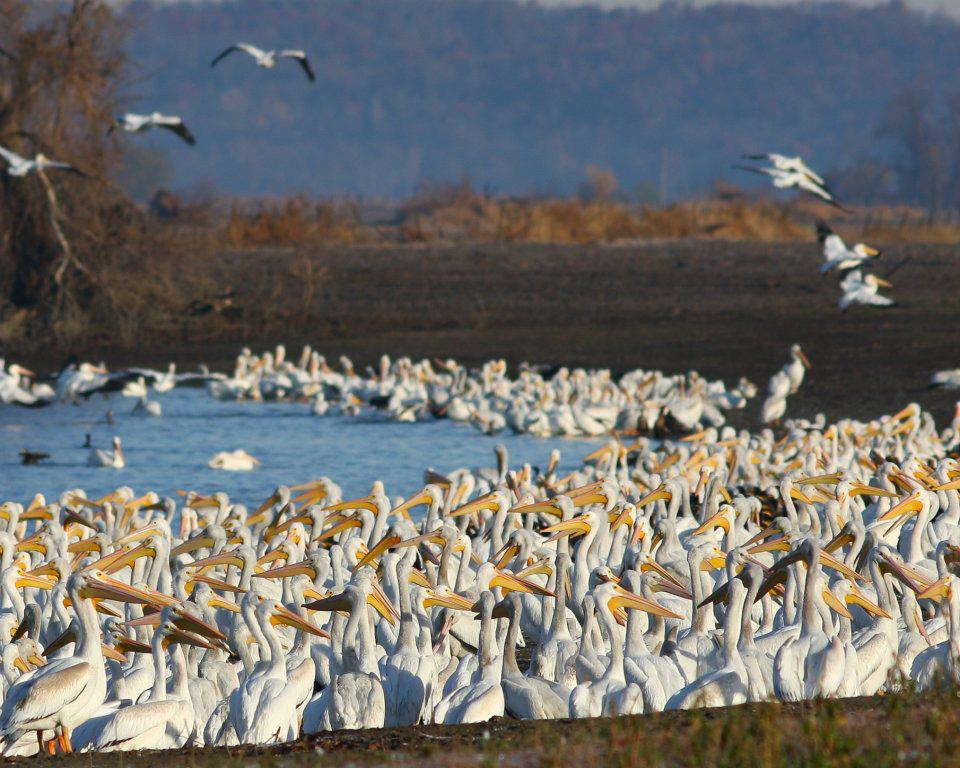
A flock of American white pelicans

The main economic activities in Cojumatlán de Régules are agriculture, fishing, and livestock production. Main crops grown include corn, tomatoes, alfalfa, and other vegetables. The main fish caught are carp and tilapia, which are filleted in small local maquiladoras.

The arrival of thousands of American white pelicans from November to March at the fishing village of Petatán has become a tourist attraction. The pelicans are dubbed borregones by the locals, in reference to the sheep-like flocks created by these large white birds. A mass feeding of fish scraps from the local filleting operations occurs in the afternoon of every day except Sundays.
