= Area code 618 (Mexico) =

Area code for Durango, Durango, Mexico

Mexican area code 618 serves the municipality of Durango in the State of Durango. The area code was created in 2002 as a result of the consolidation of location specific area codes 181, 182, and 183. The consolidation, mandated by the Plan Nacional de Numeracion (PNN), assigned area codes based on geography, and took place during the process of phone numbering restructure in Mexico. The process objective was to alleviate saturation of existing area codes, and consisted of progressively transferring numbers from the area code to the local number. The local area code went from 181 to 18 and lastly to 1, while at the same time the local number length increased from 5 to 7 digits.

In the process, local area codes went from designating a city or town to designating a geographical area. The new 618 area code is centered in Victoria de Durango; the original code for the city of Victoria de Durango was 1812. A total of 3,078,901 numbers have been assigned to this area code as of November 2018.

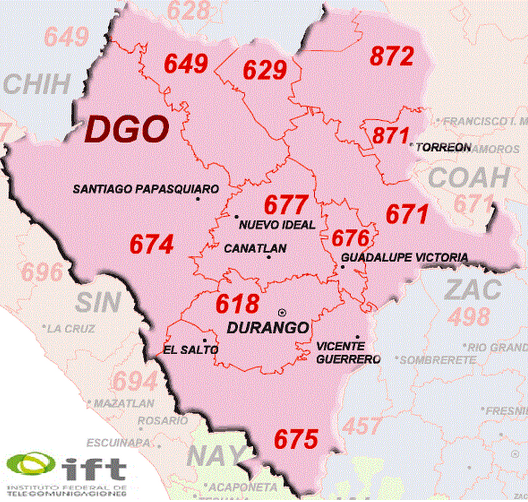
Durango State Area Codes

Municipalities in the area code: 1

Municipality	INEGI Code
Durango	10005

Cities and Towns in the area code: 22

Town	Inegi Code
Abraham Gonzalez	100050127
Arenal, El (San Jeronimo)	100050132
Banderas del Aguila	100050136
Cince de Febrero	100050149
Cinco de Mayo	100050150
Colonia Hidalgo	100050187
Ferreria, La (Cuatro de Octubre)	100050340
Fray Francisco Montes de Oca	100050173
Gabino Santillan	100050176
General Carlos Real	100050177
Jose Maria Morelos y Payon (La Tinaja)	100050193
Jose Maria Pino Suarez	100050297
Jose Refugio Salcido	100050194
Llano Grande	100050204
Nayar, El	100050219
Pilar de Zaragoza	100050229
Praxedis G. Guerrero Nuevo (La Loma)	100050613
Santiago Bayacora	100050277
Sebastian Lerdo de Tejada	100050279
Tomas Urbina	100050283
Victoria de Durango (Durango)	100050001
Villa Montemorelos	100050298

Companies providing phone service in the area code: 28

Company
Alestra
AT&T
Axtel
Bestphone
Convergia
Dialoga
Freedompop
IBO Cell
IP Matrix
Marcatelcom
Maxcom
MCM
Mega Tel
Megacable
Movistar
QBOCel
Servitron
Servnet
Starsatel
Talktel
Telcel
Telecomunicaciones 360
Telmex
Total Play
TV Rey
UC Telecom

Local Number: 7 Digits; International dialing: +52 + 618 + 7 digits

From	To a Landline	To a Cell Phone (Caller paid CPP)	To a Cell Phone (Receiver paid MPP)
Landline (Local dialing)	7 digits	044 + 618 + 7 digits	7 digits
Cell (Local dialing)	7 digits	618 + 7 digits	7 digits
Landline (Long distance)	01 + 618 + 7 digits	045 + 618 + 7 digits	01 + 618 + 7 digits
Cell (Long distance)	01 + 618 + 7 digits	045 + 618 + 7 digits	01 + 618 + 7 digits
