= Cotija de la Paz =

Municipality in Michoacán, Mexico

Coordinates: 19°49′N 102°41′W

- Municipality
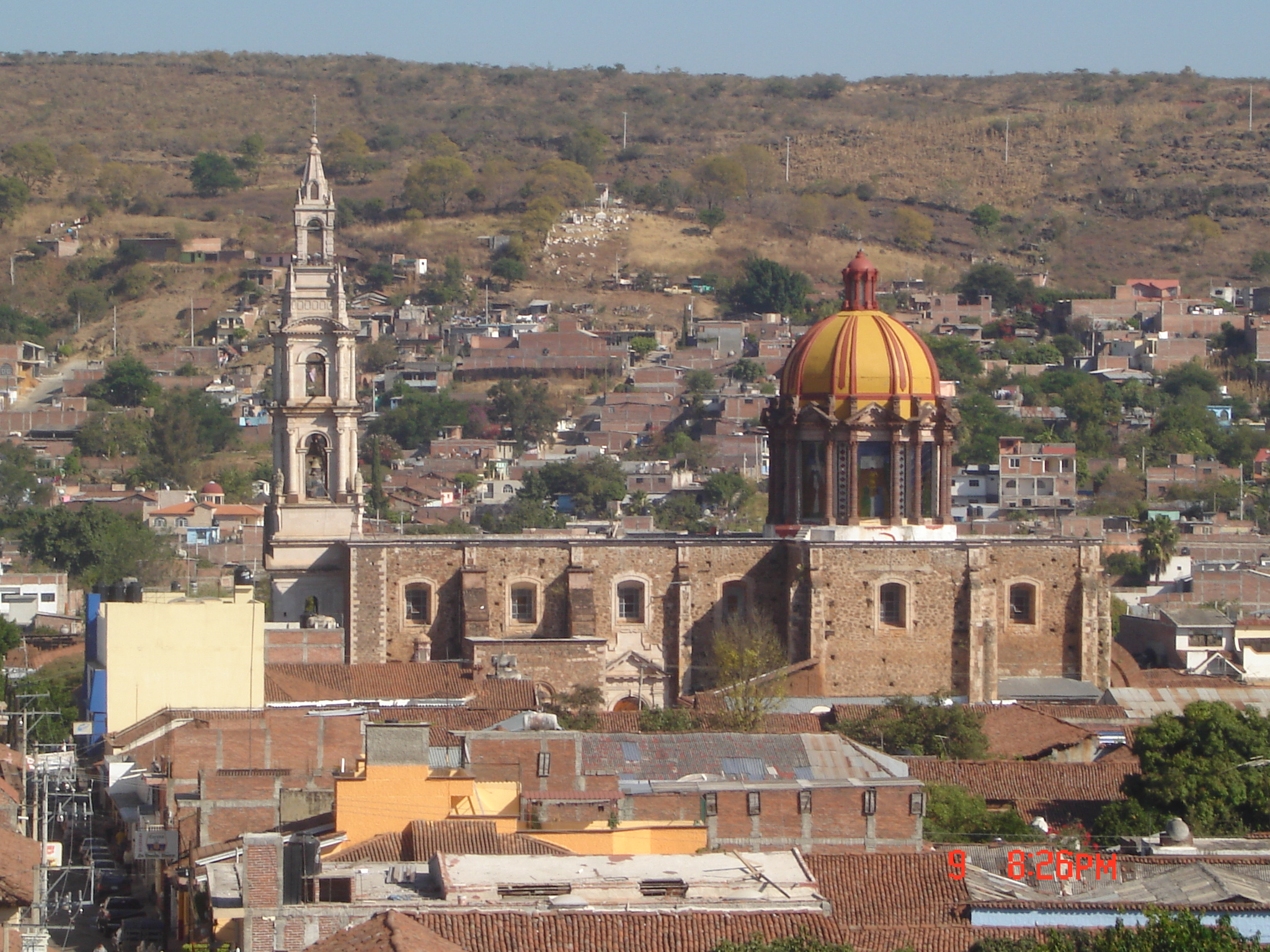

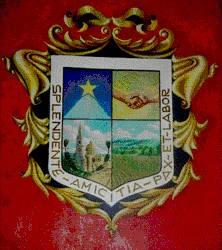
- Coat of arms

- Location in Mexico Cotija de la Paz (Mexico)
- Country: Mexico
- State: Michoacán
- Demonym: (in Spanish)
- Time zone: UTC−6 (CST)

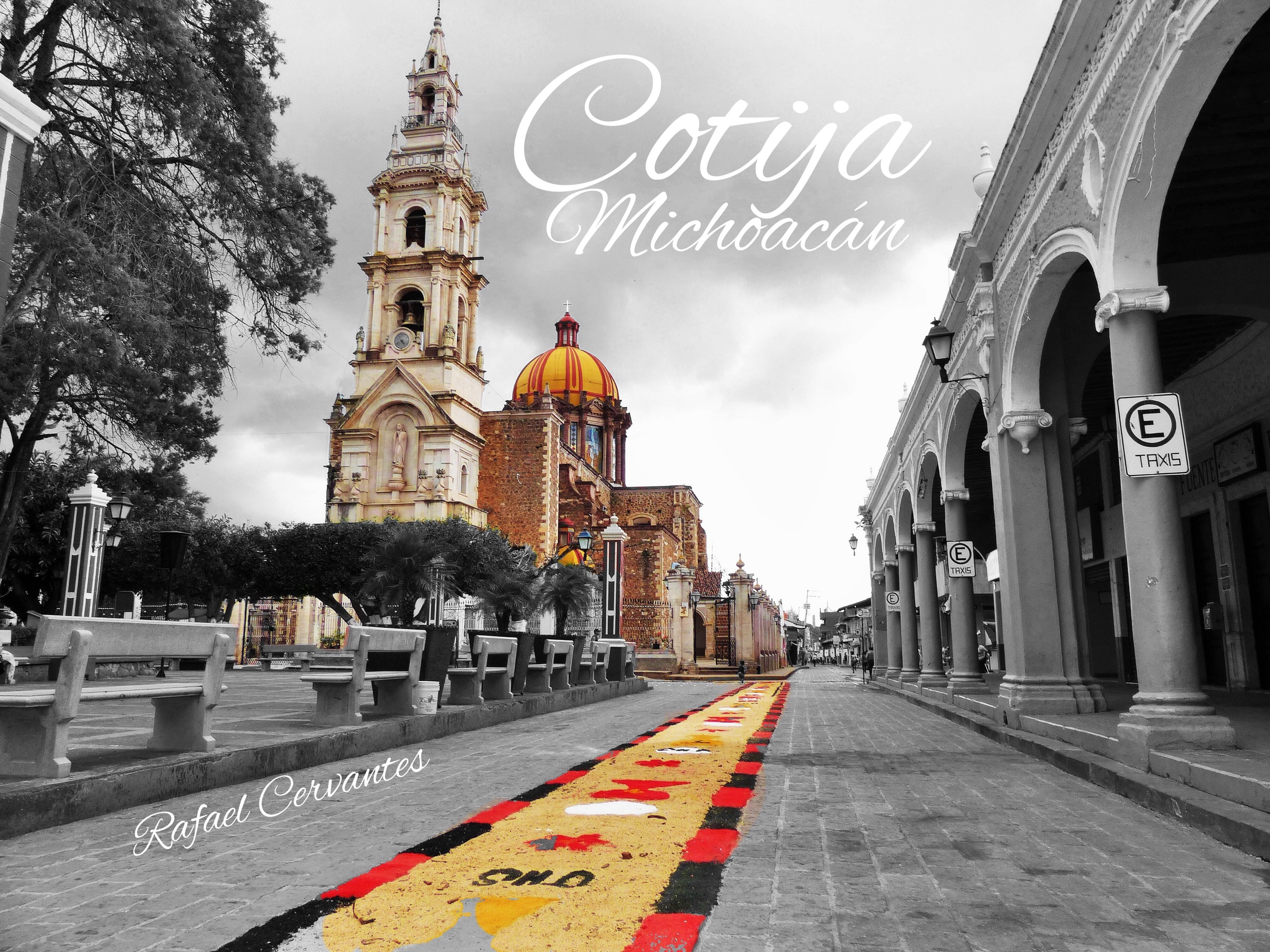
Church in Cotija

Cotija is a municipality in the Mexican state of Michoacán. The municipality has an area of 504.05 km^{2} (0.91% of the surface of the state), and is bordered to the north by Jiquilpan and Villamar, to the east by Tocumbo, and to south by the state of Jalisco. The municipality had a population of 18,207 inhabitants according to the 2005 census. Its municipal seat is the city of Cotija de la Paz (pop. 12,453).

Cotija is the birthplace of several religious figures, including Saint Rafael Guízar Valencia and Father Marcial Maciel. The economy of the municipality is mostly based on agriculture and ranching. Cotija cheese is named after the city.

In 2023, Cotija was designated a Pueblo Mágico by the Mexican government, recognizing its cultural and historical importance.

== History ==
Versions differ regarding the founding date of Cotija. The Reverend Jose Romero places the founding between 1575 and 1576, in a site called Cotixa, which was situated near the Rio Claro (Clear River), Mr. Melchor Manzo de Corona built what became the first Spanish settlement in the region. From 1581 to 1595, 11 other Spanish colonists joined Corona in Cotixa. Some built their houses, and they attempted to make a living by raising cattle. Other Spanish families arrived. At the time, this Spanish settlement was known as the Rincon de Cotixa (Cotixa Nook) and Mr. Melchor Manzo's hacienda was considered the heart of the settlement. A primitive chapel was constructed in honor of Our Lady of the Pópolo, where a flea market (tianguis) was held on Sundays. By 1730, the chapel of the Rincon de Cotixa had a standing priest, but baptisms, marriages, and burials were not allowed. Therefore, travelling to the town of Tingüindín for those religious affairs was necessary. This situation was not remedied until November 1740, when the Bishop of Michoacán, Fr. Marks Ramirez of the Prado, gave permission to the chapel of the Rincon de Cotixa to perform ecclesiastical burials. Between August 2 and 5, 1759, Francisco Antonio de Echavarri decreed that the Rincon de Cotixa and the Llano of Titiacoro would be united and officially renamed as the Congregation of Cotija. In 1790, Cotija was reclassified as a city by Michoacán governor, Aristeo Mercado.

In the late 2010s, cartel warfare began to increase around the region, eventually resulting in Cotija's local police being overthrown by a cartel. The cartel has remained in power over the town ever since, leading to an increase in the occurrence of murders.

== See also ==
- Municipalities of Mexico
