= ITJ =

ITJ may refer to:

- Instituto Tecnológico de Jiquilpan
- Institute of Traditional Judaism
- Instituto Thomas Jefferson
