= Armando Contreras Ceballos =

Mexican politician

- Born: 29 March 1962 (age 64); Puruándiro, Michoacán, Mexico
- Occupation: Politician
- Political party: PRD (2000-2015); MORENA (2015–present)

Armando Contreras Ceballos (born 29 March 1962) is a Mexican politician affiliated with the Party of the Democratic Revolution (PRD). He was municipal president of Puruandiro from 2008 to 2011.

In the 2012 general election he was elected to the Chamber of Deputies to represent Michoacán's second district during the 62nd Congress.
