= Marciano Torres Robledo =

Mexican politician

- Born: 8 March 1959 (age 67); Michoacán, Mexico
- Education: IPN
- Occupation: Politician
- Political party: PRD

José Marciano Torres Robledo (born 8 March 1959) is a Mexican politician from the Party of the Democratic Revolution (PRD). In the 2009 mid-terms he was elected to the Chamber of Deputies to represent Michoacán's second district during the 61st Congress. He previously served as municipal president of José Sixto Verduzco in 2005–2007.
