= Inelvo Moreno Álvarez =

Mexican politician

- Born: 27 January 1970 (age 56); Mexico City, Mexico
- Education: UMSNH
- Occupation: Politician
- Political party: PRD

Inelvo Moreno Álvarez (born 27 January 1970) is a Mexican politician affiliated with the Party of the Democratic Revolution (PRD). In the 2003 mid-terms he was elected to the Chamber of Deputies to represent Michoacán's 12th district during the 59th session of Congress.
