= Irineo Mendoza Mendoza =

Mexican politician

- Born: 7 July 1970 (age 55); Michoacán, Mexico
- Occupation: Politician
- Political party: PRD

Irineo Mendoza Mendoza (born 7 July 1970) is a Mexican politician affiliated with the Party of the Democratic Revolution. In the 2006 general election he was elected to the Chamber of Deputies to represent Michoacán's 12th district during the 60th session of Congress.
