= Ricardo Sánchez Gálvez =

Mexican politician (born 1974)

- Born: 12 January 1974 (age 52); Sahuayo, Michoacán, Mexico
- Occupation: Politician
- Political party: PRI

Ricardo Sánchez Gálvez (born 12 January 1974) is a Mexican politician from the Institutional Revolutionary Party (PRI). In the 2009 mid-terms he was elected to the Chamber of Deputies to represent Michoacán's fourth district during the 61st Congress.
