= Purépero de Echaíz =

Purépero
- Town
- Purépero de Echáiz
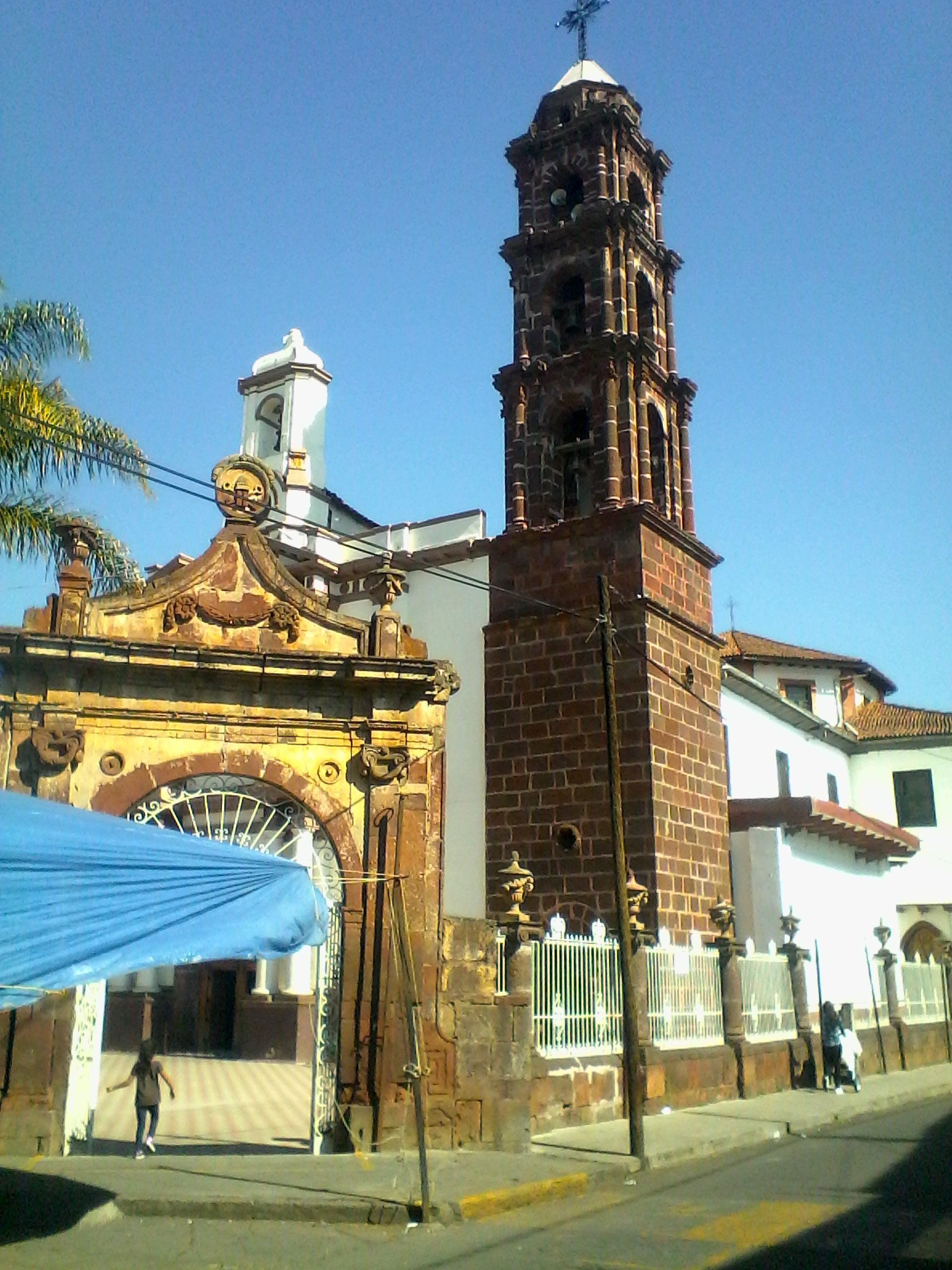

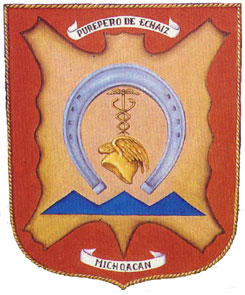
- Coat of arms

- Location of Purépero de Echáiz in Mexico
- Coordinates: 19°54′00″N 102°01′00″W
- Country: Mexico
- State: Michoacán
- Municipality: Purépero
- Founded: 1530

Government
  - Mayor: José Cuauhtémoc Vega Robledo
- Elevation: 2,022 m (6,634 ft)

Population (2025)
  - Total: 23,713
- Time zone: UTC−6 (CST)
- Postal code: 58760
- Area code: 471
- Demonym: Pureperense
- Website: http://purepero.com/mx/

Purépero de Echaíz is a town in the northwest of the state of Michoacán in Mexico and head of the municipality of Purépero. Purépero is located in the middle of the Tarascan Plateau. Purépero is 113 km from the state capital of Morelia and is bordered to the north by Tlazazalca, to the east by Zacapu, to the south by Chilchota, and to the west by Tangancícuaro.

== Toponym ==
The name Purépero is of Purépecha origin and has several proposed meanings. The first proposed meaning is "place of commoners". Another possible meaning is derived from the phrase "those who are visiting". Finally, "place of the indigenous people" has also been suggested as a possibility.

== Geography ==
=== Climate ===
Under the Köppen climate classification, Purépero de Echaíz has a Subtropical highland climate classified as Cwb.

Climate data for Purépero de Echaíz, Michoacán
Month	Jan	Feb	Mar	Apr	May	Jun	Jul	Aug	Sep	Oct	Nov	Dec	Year
Record high °F	91.4	95.0	102.2	95	103.1	90.5	85.1	84.2	84.2	84.2	84.2	84.2	103.1
Mean daily maximum °F	71.8	73.9	78.1	81.7	82.6	78.8	73.6	73.9	73.6	73.6	73.4	71.8	75.6
Mean daily minimum °F	37.6	37.9	42.1	46.8	50.9	53.6	52.3	51.3	50.5	46.0	40.8	39.7	45.9
Record low °F	23.0	21.2	29.3	32	39.2	33.8	36.5	38.3	26.6	33.8	30.0	28.4	21.2
Average rainfall inches	0.8	0.4	0.2	0.7	1.7	7.0	10.4	9.2	7.3	3.5	0.7	0.6	42.4
Record high °C	33.0	35.0	39.0	35	39.5	32.5	29.5	29.0	29.0	29.0	29.0	29.0	39.5
Mean daily maximum °C	22.1	23.3	25.6	27.6	28.1	26.0	23.1	23.3	23.1	23.1	23.0	22.1	24.2
Mean daily minimum °C	3.1	3.3	5.6	8.2	10.5	12.0	11.3	10.7	10.3	7.8	4.9	4.3	7.7
Record low °C	−5.0	−6.0	−1.5	0	4.0	1.0	2.5	3.5	−3.0	1.0	−1.1	−2.0	−6.0
Average rainfall mm	20	10	5.1	18	43	180	260	230	190	89	18	15	1,080
Average rainy days	2.2	1.6	1.2	2.4	4.7	13.4	19.1	18.9	14.5	7.0	2.0	1.6	88.6
Mean daily sunshine hours	11.5	11.9	12.4	13.0	13.5	13.7	13.6	13.2	12.6	12.0	11.6	11.3	12.5
Source: Weatherbase

== Demographics ==
In 2010, the total population of Purépero de Echáiz was 15,306. The total population consisted of 7,423 men and 7,883 women.

Educational attainment varied by level, with 7,352 of the population older than five having a primary education. Of the population older than eighteen, 692 individuals had a professional level education and 49 individuals had a postgraduate level education. Graduation statistics from 2009 showed 285 graduates from preschool, 272 graduates from primary school, and 159 graduates from high school.

In 2010, the overall literacy rate of the population aged 15 to 24 was 98.7% with the literacy rate of men within this age group being 98.1% and the literacy rate of women within this age group being 99.3%.

== Culture ==
=== Festivals ===
The most important festival in Purépero is in honor of John the Baptist, the patron saint of the town, and is held from June 20 to June 25. The celebrations of this festival on June 24 include dances performed by various occupational groups including bakers, horse trainers, blacksmiths, and reboceros. Pureperenses living within Mexico and settled abroad often return to celebrate this occasion.

Other feast days are celebrated in Purépero de Echáiz as well. The festival of Saint Isidore is celebrated in Purépero on May 15 with a parade of wagons. On November 22, the festival of Saint Cecilia is celebrated with a parade and performances by the local mariachi group Ordaz and the Cendejas. The feast of the Virgin of Guadalupe is celebrated on December 12.

The people of Purépero also celebrate civic holidays and observances such as the Fiestas Patrias.

== See also ==
- Villa Mendoza
