= Cuauhtémoc Montero Esquivel =

Mexican politician

- Born: 3 April 1960 (age 66); Michoacán, Mexico
- Occupation: Politician
- Political party: PRD

Cuauhtémoc Rafael Montero Esquivel (born 3 April 1960) is a Mexican politician from the Party of the Democratic Revolution (PRD). In the 2000 general election he was elected to the Chamber of Deputies to represent Michoacán's 12th district during the 58th session of Congress.
