= Lago de Camécuaro National Park =

Park in Michoacán, Mexico

- IUCN category II (national park)
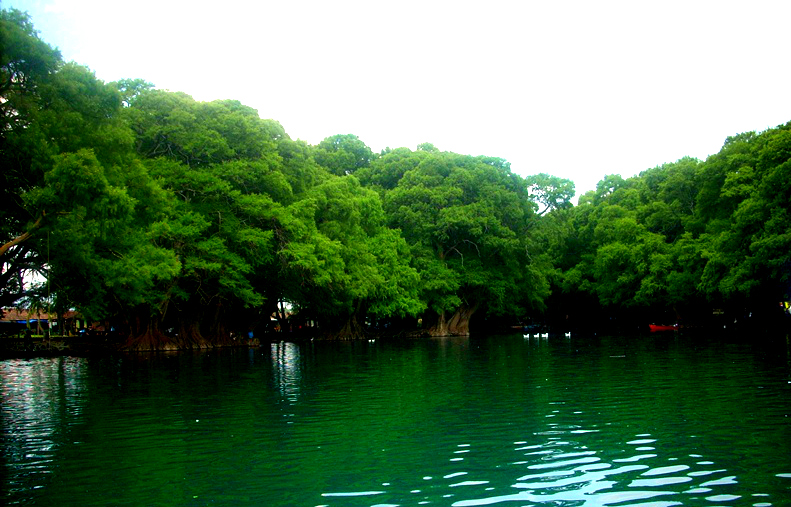
- Lake Camécuaro in Lago de Camécuaro National Park, May 2011

- Location within Mexico
- Location: Tangancícuaro Municipality, Michoacán, Mexico
- Nearest city: Zamora de Hidalgo, Michoacán
- Coordinates: 19°54′10″N 102°12′39″W
- Area: 9.65 hectares (23.8 acres)
- Established: December 8, 1941
- Governing body: Secretariat of the Environment and Natural Resources

Lago de Camécuaro National Park is located east of the city of Zamora de Hidalgo in the municipality of Tangancícuaro in the state of Michoacán. The park consists of 9.65 hectares (23.8 acres) of protected area including Camécuaro Lake which is supplied by a series of natural springs. The lake is popular due to its clear water and the vegetation that surrounds the lake. Even though the lake is relatively small, many photographers from all over Mexico come to take photographs of the park's views.

== Toponymy ==
Camécuaro derives from the native language purépecha or tarasca which means "Place of Bathing"

== Geography ==
Lago de Camécuaro National Park is located 14 km (8.5 mi) east of the city of Zamora de Hidalgo, Michoacán on Federal Highway 15 heading towards Morelia, Michoacán. The lake itself has a surface area of approximately 1.6 hectares (4.0 acres) and has a maximum depth of 6 metres (20 ft). The lake is supplied with water from numerous springs slightly to the south of the lake. Camécuaro Lake then empties at a slow rate into the Duero River which is an important tributary to the Lerma River.

The park is part of a large alluvial plain surrounded by mountains with a northeast-southeast orientation. The topography of the park is flat with no slopes greater than 5%. The park is found at 1,700 m (5,577 ft) above sea level. During the Cenozoic the area was a flood plain of the Duero River which deposited large amounts of basalt, breccia, calcareous tuff, tuff, andesite, and rhyolite. The dominant basalt rock found in the area give the soil a rich source of: calcium, magnesium, iron, potassium, and sodium. The soils in the park and surrounding areas are rich and fertile making the region perfect for agriculture. The soil in the area is classified as pellic vertisol with significant amounts of chromate; the soil is of fine texture with rocky layer containing rocks smaller than 7.5 cm³.

== History ==
The park was declared a national park by President Lázaro Cárdenas del Río on July 18, 1940 in efforts to conserve the flora and fauna found there. The presidential decree was later signed into law on December 8, 1941.

== Climate ==
The park has a humid subtropical climate (Cwa) with average annual temperature of 18.5 °C (65 °F). The warmest month is May with an average temperature of 23.3 °C (74 °F), and the coldest month is December with an average temperature of 14.7 °C (59 °F). The park has an average annual precipitation of about 900.6 mm (35.4 in) mostly falling during the summer.

Climate data for Zamora de Hidalgo, Michoacán
Month	Jan	Feb	Mar	Apr	May	Jun	Jul	Aug	Sep	Oct	Nov	Dec	Year
Mean daily maximum °C (°F)	25 (77)	26 (79)	29 (84)	31 (88)	32 (90)	30 (86)	27 (81)	27 (81)	27 (81)	27 (81)	27 (81)	25 (77)	27 (81)
Mean daily minimum °C (°F)	8 (46)	9 (48)	11 (52)	13 (55)	16 (61)	17 (63)	16 (61)	16 (61)	16 (61)	14 (57)	11 (52)	8 (46)	12 (54)
