= Manuel Duarte Ramírez =

Mexican politician

- Born: 29 November 1962 (age 63); Penjamillo, Michoacán, Mexico
- Education: UMSNH
- Occupation: Politician
- Political party: MORENA

Manuel Duarte Ramírez (born 29 November 1962) is a Mexican politician from the Party of the Democratic Revolution (PRD). In the 2000 general election he was elected to the Chamber of Deputies to represent Michoacán's second district during the 58th Congress (2000–2003).
