= Salvador Ortiz García =

Mexican politician

- Born: 28 November 1964 (age 61); Apatzingán, Michoacán, Mexico
- Occupation: Politician
- Political party: PRI

Salvador Ortiz García (born 28 November 1964) is a Mexican politician affiliated with the Institutional Revolutionary Party (PRI). In the 2012 general election he was elected to the Chamber of Deputies to represent Michoacán's 12th district during the 62nd session of Congress.
