= Richard Sánchez =

Richard Sánchez may refer to:

- Richard Sánchez (footballer, born 1994), Mexican footballer who plays as a goalkeeper
- Richard Sánchez (footballer, born 1996), Paraguayan footballer who plays as a midfielder
- Rick Sanchez (Richard Daniel Sanchez III), a fictional character in the animated television series Rick and Morty

== See also ==
- Ricardo Sanchez (disambiguation)
