= Jiquilpan Institute of Technology =

University in Michoacán, Mexico

Instituto Tecnológico de Jiquilpan
- Motto: SOCIAL JUSTICE IN THE INDUSTRIAL TECHNIFICATION
- Type: Public
- Director: Dr. Octavio Ramírez Rojas
- Location: Jiquilpan, Michoacán, Mexico
- Nickname: Hawks
- Website: itjilpan.edu.mx

The Instituto Tecnológico de Jiquilpan ("Technological Institute of Jiquilpan" or ITJ) is a university in Jiquilpan de Juárez in the Mexican state of Michoacán.

The idea of founding the institution originated with Dr. Víctor Manuel Ceja Valencia and other alumni of the National Polytechnic Institute (IPN), who saw the need for a local university when high school graduates had to move to the state capital (Morelia) or as far as Mexico City and Guadalajara to obtain a college education.

The idea was supported by the Governor of Michoacán Carlos Torres Manzo, who donated the land on the institution is currently located. Luis Echeverría Álvarez, then President of Mexico approved a decree on November 27, 1976 which authorized the creation of the ITJ. The first semester of courses started on February 14, 1977.

== Academics ==
=== Undergraduate programs ===
- Architecture
- Engineering Business Management
- Industrial Engineering
- Computer Systems Engineering
- Biochemistry
- Business Administration
- Informatics
- Accounting

== Student life ==
Students can create student groups and participate in a number of events running every year. They can choose to take many recreational activities in the areas of athletics and the arts.
