= José María Valencia Barajas =

Mexican politician

Member of the Chamber of Deputies
- In office 2009–2012
- Constituency: Michoacán's 12th

Personal details
- Born: 20 April 1963 (age 62) Michoacán, Mexico
- Party: PRD
- Occupation: Politician

José María Valencia Barajas (born 20 April 1963) is a Mexican politician from the Party of the Democratic Revolution (PRD).

== Career ==
In the 2009 mid-terms, Valencia Barajas was elected to the Chamber of Deputies to represent Michoacán's 12th district during the 61st session of Congress.
