= Karielys Cuadros =

Venezuelan beauty pageant titleholder

Karielys Cuadros Rodríguez
- Born: Karielys Cuadros Rodríguez; 1996 (age 29–30); Maracay, Aragua
- Other name: Karielys Cuadros
- Height: 1.73 m (5 ft 8 in)
- Beauty pageant titleholder
- Hair color: Black
- Eye color: Brown
- Major competitions: Miss Venezuela Mundo 2015 (1st Runner-Up); Reina Hispanoamericana 2015 (1st Runner-Up)

Karielys Cuadros Rodríguez is a Venezuelan beauty pageant titleholder. She competed at Miss Venezuela Mundo 2015 held on July 4 where she landed as First Runner-Up.

== Personal life ==
Karielys was born in Maracay, Aragua state, but at a very young age moved to Cantaura, Anzoátegui state, where she received primary and secondary education. Currently she is studying Public Accounting in the Universidad de Oriente. Karielys is a clarinetist and pianist of system orchestras of Venezuela.

== Miss Venezuela Mundo 2015 ==
- Karielys competed in the 7th edition of Miss Venezuela Mundo 2015 and placed First Runner-Up.
