= Charapan =

Municipality in Michoacán, Mexico

Coordinates: 19°39′N 102°15′W

- Municipality
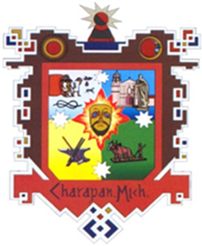
- Coat of arms

- Location in Mexico Charapan (Mexico)
- Country: Mexico
- State: Michoacán
- Demonym: (in Spanish)
- Time zone: UTC−6 (CST)

Charapan is a municipality located in the north-western part of the Mexican state of Michoacán. The municipality has an area of 233.16 square kilometres (0.17% of the surface of the state) and is bordered to the north by the municipalities of Tangancícuaro and Chilchota, to the east by Paracho, to the south by Uruapan, and to the west by Los Reyes. The municipality had a population of 10,867 inhabitants according to the 2005 census. Its municipal seat is the city of the same name.

== See also ==
- Municipalities of Michoacán
