= Pastor Ortiz =

The city of Pastor Ortiz (Zurumuato old name) is in the north of the Mexican state of Michoacán. It is the municipal seat for the municipality of Jose Sixto Verduzco. It is located at 20.3023°N 101.597°W. The population is 5,000.

The old name of the city means "place in straw hill" in the Purépecha language.
