= Tingüindín =

Coordinates: 19°44′N 102°29′W

- Municipality
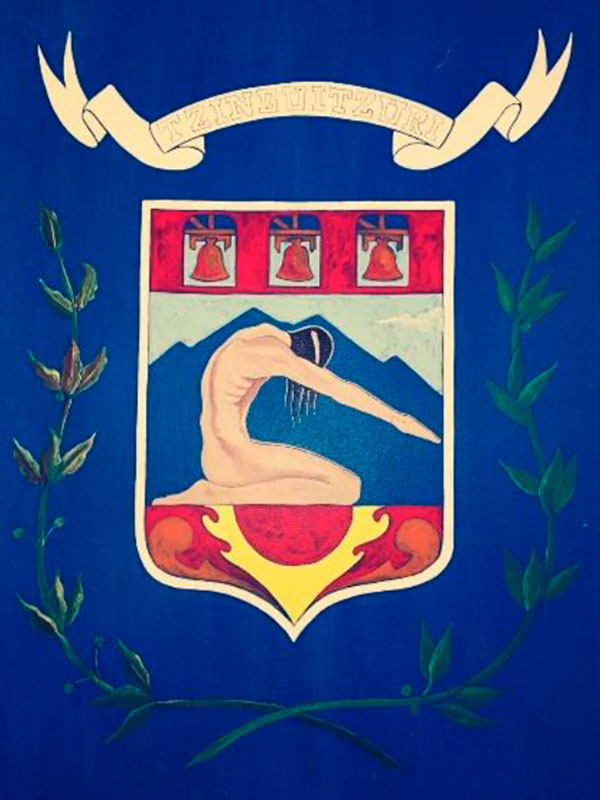
- Coat of arms

- Location in Mexico Tingüindín (Mexico)
- Country: Mexico
- State: Michoacán
- Demonym: (in Spanish)
- Time zone: UTC−6 (CST)

Tingüindín is a municipality in the Mexican state of Michoacán. The municipality has an area of 174.24 square kilometres (0.29% of the surface of the state) and is bordered to the north by the municipalities of Villamar, Tangamandapio and Tangancícuaro, to the east by Los Reyes, and to the south and west by Tocumbo. The municipality had a population of 12,414 inhabitants according to the 2005 census. Its municipal seat is the city of the same name.

Before the arrival of the Spaniards to Tingüindín in 1530 the area was known as Tzinguitzuri or "Place of worship" by the mostly Purepecha population.

The economy of the municipality is based mostly on avocado harvest ranching and the cultivation of maize and wheat.

The principal festivity takes place on August 15 in honor of the Assumption of the Blessed Virgin Mary into Heaven. During this festivity, Tingüindín undergoes a complete transformation. The local plaza (town square) is filled with carnival rides and booths. There are booths that sell many varieties of Mexican food. These festivities start on August 1 and end with a great celebration on August 15.
