= Enrique Torres Cuadros =

Mexican politician

- Born: 26 July 1957 (age 68); Michoacán, Mexico
- Occupation: Politician
- Political party: PRD

Enrique Torres Cuadros (born 26 July 1957) is a Mexican politician affiliated with the Party of the Democratic Revolution (PRD). In the 2003 mid-terms he was elected to the Chamber of Deputies to represent Michoacán's second district during the 59th Congress.
