= Villa Mendoza =

Coordinates: 19°57′N 101°58′W

Villa Mendoza is a town in the Purépero municipality in the state of Michoacán, Mexico.

It was founded by Justo Mendoza at an unknown date but there are records as early as the 1760s documenting births and baptisms indicating the village's existence. Little by little the town started to grow and its residents decided to name the main street with Mendoza's name. A few houses that were built since the town's founding still exist but are very deteriorated. Villa Mendoza has many legends and even though it is a very peaceful town now, some of those legends still remain alive by those who pass them on. Before it was named Villa Mendoza its name was “Casas Viejas” meaning old houses. The houses that are spoken of are made out of adobe and pre-date the 1800s. (Generally speaking Villa Mendoza has generated countless generations of the families who have migrated generally to the United States, Uruapan Mich, Baja California, and Tierra Caliente.
