= Tangancícuaro =

Municipality in Michoacán, Mexico

Coordinates: 19.887°N 102.208°W

- Municipality
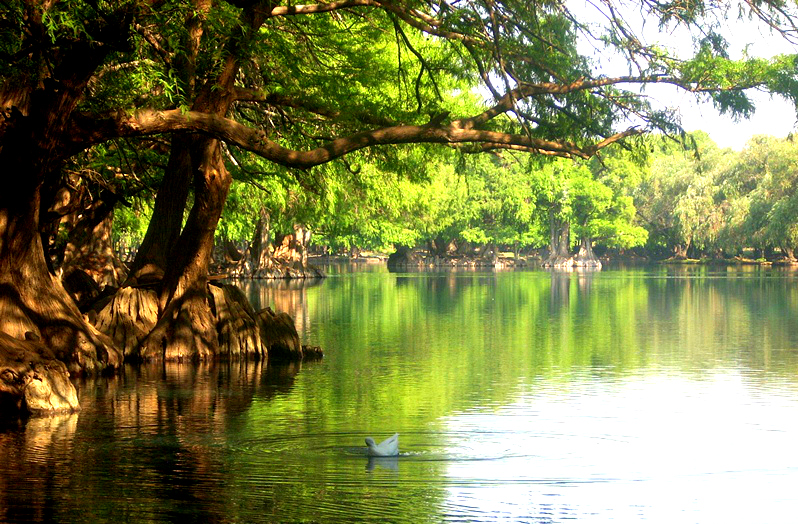

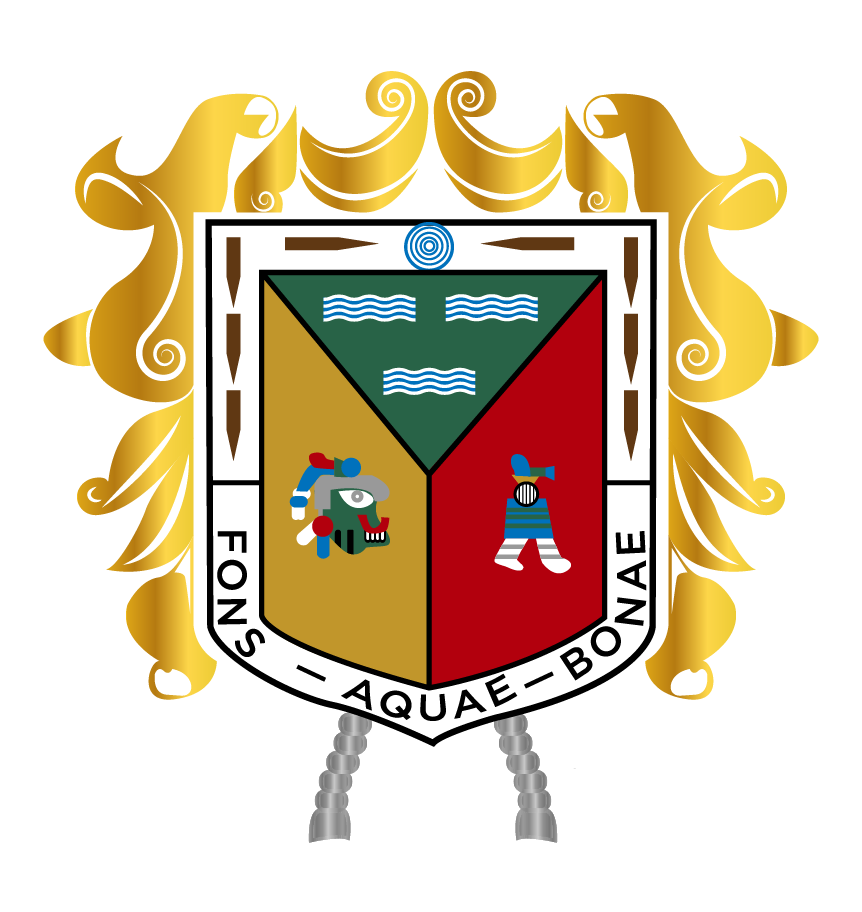
- Coat of arms

- Location in Mexico Tangancícuaro (Mexico)
- Country: Mexico
- State: Michoacán

Population (2020)
  - Municipality: 35,256
  - Seat: 15,414
- Demonym: (in Spanish)
- Time zone: UTC−6 (CST)

Tangancícuaro is a municipality in the Mexican state of Michoacán.

The municipal seat is the City of Tangancícuaro de Arista.

== Geography ==
Tangancícuaro is at an altitude of 1,700 meters above sea level, with an area of 387.95 km^{2}. Its population was estimated at 33,815 in 1996 and has a slightly negative population growth attributed to emigration to the interior and outside of the country.

It is bordered on the north by Zamora, Jacona and Tlazazalca, to the east by Purépero and Chilchota, to the south by Charapan, Los Reyes and Tingüindin, and to the west by Tangamandapio.

Its distance to the Michoacán State Capital is 134 kilometers.

Natural features include the Duero River, Lake Junguarán, Lake Camécuaro, and Lake Cupatziro.

== Economy ==
The economy is based on agriculture with some industry and tourism.

== Tourism ==
Tourist destinations include Lago de Camécuaro National Park, the location of Lake Camécuaro (Lago de Camécuaro).

== See also ==
- Lago de Camécuaro National Park
- Municipalities of Michoacán
