= Chilchota (municipality) =

Chilchota Municipality
- Municipality
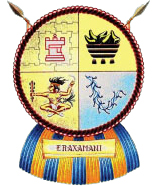
- Coat of arms

- Location of Chilchota in Mexico
- Coordinates: 19°50′50″N 101°07′05″W
- Country: Mexico
- State: Michoacán
- Established: 1831
- Municipal seat: Chilchota

Government
  - Municipal president: Mario Silva Amezcua (PRI)

Area
  - Total: 304.51 km^{2} (117.57 sq mi)
- Elevation: 1,770 m (5,810 ft)

Population (2010)
  - Total: 10,907
  - Density: 35.818/km^{2} (92.769/sq mi)
- Time zone: UTC-6 (CST)

Chilchota is a municipality in the Mexican state of Michoacán.

== Political entity ==
It is located to the northeast of the state; it borders north with Tangancicuaro and Purepero, east with Zacapu and Cherán, south with Charapan and Paracho and west with Tangancicuaro. It is 120 km away from the capital of the state. It has an area of 304.51 square kilometres (117.57 sq mi) and represents 0.51% of the state's surface. It has a population of about 10,907 people. They have an established administrative structure made of: Town Hall, Treasury, Municipal Social Development, Public Security, Administrative Office, Integral Family Development and Drinking Water Offices. Its current mayor is Mario Silva Amezcua.

== Geography ==
Its relief is constituted by the Trans-Mexican Volcanic Belt and the hills of Viejo, Cobre and San Ignacio. The hydrography is made by the rivers Dueto and Rito. Its climate is mild, it has rains on summer. It has an annual rainfall of 1,000.0 millimeters and temperatures that range from 2.5 to 38.0º Celsius. The woods are mixed with oak and pine, the fauna is made by cacomistle, skunk, racoon, hare, tlacuache and coyote. The ground provides podzolic ground, its main use is directed to cattle raising and a minor proportion is used for farming and forestation purposes.

== History ==
Chilchota means "place of the chiles or green chiles". During the colonial period chile was cultivated and collected in a high scale allowing people to trade frequently. In 1524, Chilchota was the home to many Hispanic families and throughout time it became known as "Republica de indios en la Nueva Espana". In 1831, territorial law named Chilchota a municipality. In 1939, Chilchota became part of the politic party of Tlazazalca along with Penjamillo y Purepero. When the organization disappeared, Chilchota became part of the ex-districts from Zamora.
