= Tocumbo Municipality =

Coordinates: 19°42′N 102°32′W

Tocumbo
- Municipality

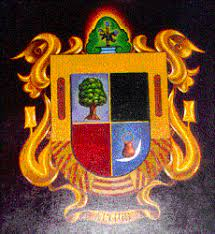
- Coat of arms

- Location in Mexico Tocumbo (Mexico)
- Country: Mexico
- State: Michoacán

Population (2020)
  - Municipality: 10,926
- Demonym: (in Spanish)
- Time zone: UTC−6 (CST)

Tocumbo is a municipality in the Mexican state of Michoacán. The municipality has an area of 506.85 square kilometres (195.70 sq mi) (0.86% of the surface of the state) and is bordered to the north by Tingüindín, to the east by Los Reyes, to south by the state of Jalisco, and to the west by Cotija. The municipality had a population of 8,820 inhabitants according to the 2005 census. Its municipal seat is the city of the same name. The economy of the municipality is mostly based on agriculture and ranching.
