= Marcos Castellanos =

Municipality in Michoacán, Mexico

Coordinates: 20.0351°N 102.9727°W

- Municipality
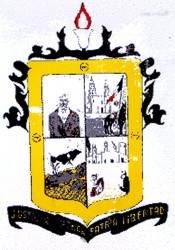
- Coat of arms

- Location in Mexico Marcos Castellanos (Mexico)
- Country: Mexico
- State: Michoacán
- Demonym: (in Spanish)
- Time zone: UTC−6 (CST)

Marcos Castellanos is a municipality in the Mexican state of Michoacán. It is located near the southern shore of Lake Chapala. The municipal seat is the city of San José de Gracia.
