= Villamar Municipality =

- Municipality
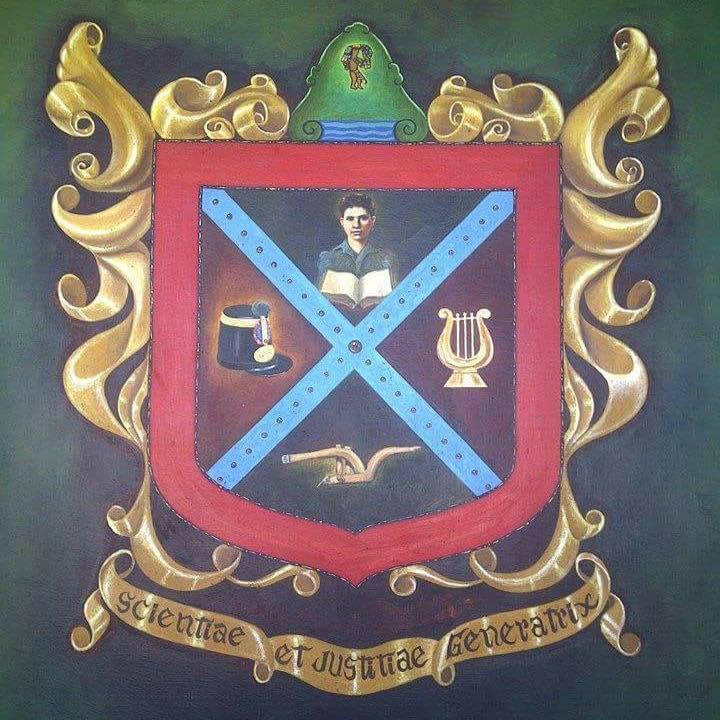
- Coat of arms

- Location of Villamar in Mexico
- Coordinates: 20°01′N 102°36′W
- Country: Mexico
- State: Michoacán
- Established: 1935
- Municipal seat: Villamar

Government
  - Municipal president: Joel López Padilla (PRI)

Area
  - Total: 352.39 km^{2} (136.06 sq mi)
- Elevation: 1,540 m (5,050 ft)

Population (2010)
  - Total: 8,129
  - Density: 23.07/km^{2} (59.75/sq mi)
- Time zone: UTC-6 (CST)

Villamar is a municipality in the Mexican state of Michoacán.

== Political entity ==
The municipality is located in the northwest of the state, 189 kilometres from the state capital of Morelia. It has a territory of 352.39 square kilometers, bordering the municipalities of Venustiano Carranza and Pajacuarán on the north, on the east with Tangamandapio, Las Zarquillas, and Chavinda, on the south with Tingüindín and Tocumbo, and on the east with Cotija, Jiquilpan and Sahuayo. Villamar has six principal communities: Villamar, Emiliano Zapata, El Platanal, Jaripo, Cerrito Colorado and San Antonio Guaracha. The municipality has a population of 8129 people. The main economic activities of the municipality include farming and ranching.

== Geography ==
It has an average height of 1,540 meters above sea level, notable elevations include the Trans-Mexican Volcanic Belt and hills Cerro Grande and Cerro Blanco.

=== Hydrography ===
Its hydrography is constituted by the Liebre creek, the San Antonio Guaracha lake, La Alberca(salted lake), cold water springs and a thermal water spring.

=== Climate ===
The climate is tempered with temperatures that range between 10.4 and 25.4 degrees C. It has rains in summer. Annual rainfall of 900 mm.

=== Flora and fauna ===
The ecosystem is dominated by prairie, with species such as huisache, cactus and yucca. The forest surface is occupied by oak and fir. Typical fauna include species such as deer, squirrels, hares, ringtails, skunks, foxes, opossums, raccoons, ducks, herons, güilotas and other birds.

== History ==
Currently named after Eligio Villamar, hero of the Mexican–American War. Initially the municipality was named Guarachita, which means little huarache or sandal. In ancient times, Villamar was part of the dominion that extended along the shore of Lake Chapala. In 1765 the municipality belonged to the curate of Zahuayo (Sahuayo), and was known as San Miguel. Its vicarage Guarachita administered more than 1,500 parishioners. It was established as a municipality under the name of Guarachita on December 10, 1831. In 1935 the municipality changed its name to Villamar.
