= Los Reyes, Michoacán =

Municipality in the Mexican state of Michoacán

Coordinates: 19°35′N 102°28′W

Los Reyes
- Municipality
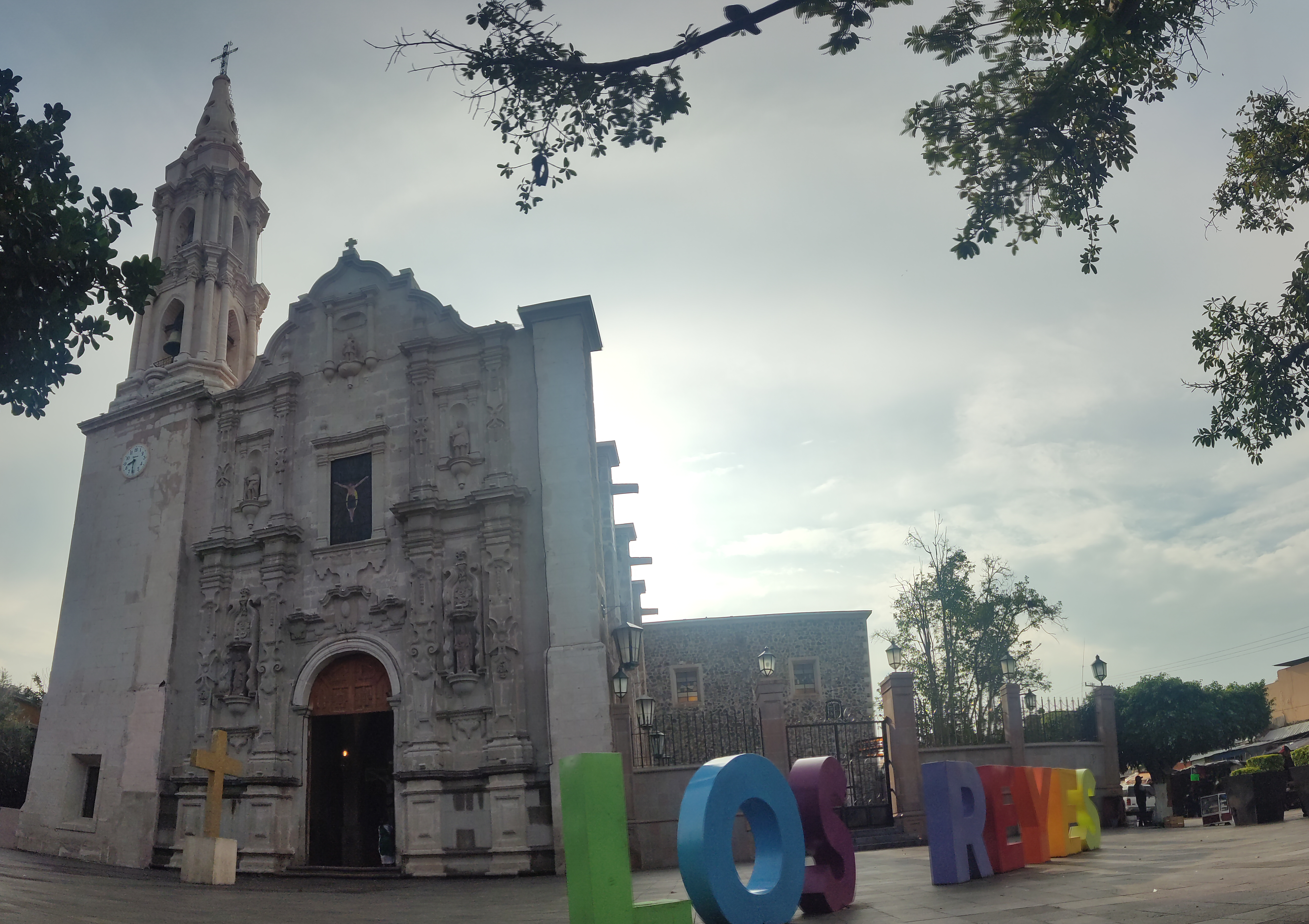
- Parish of Los Reyes

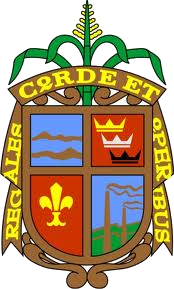
- Coat of arms

- Location in Mexico Los Reyes (Mexico)
- Country: Mexico
- State: Michoacán

Population (2020)
  - Municipality: 78,935
  - Seat: 49,940
- Demonym: (in Spanish)
- Time zone: UTC−6 (CST)

Los Reyes is a municipality in the Mexican state of Michoacán. The municipality has an area of 480.09 square kilometres (0.81% of the surface of the state) and is bordered to the north by the municipality of Tangancícuaro, to the east by Charapan, to the southeast by Uruapan, to the south by Peribán, to the southwest by Tocumbo, and to the northwest by Tingüindín. The municipality had a population of 77,000 inhabitants according to the 2009 census. Its municipal seat is the city of Los Reyes de Salgado.The city is also known for exporting avocados and blackberries. Both of these orchids surround the area between Los Reyes and Periban, it is also home of the Lobos Grises de los Reyes (Grey Wolves) a professional soccer team currently playing in the Tercera Division Mexicana at Group IX.

The City of Los Reyes, was founded according to royal decree on 12 May 1594. In 1837 it acquired the head of the western district. In 1859, Los Reyes was assigned the status of villa, bearing the name "Villa de Salgado", in memory of the insurgent patriot Don José Francisco Trinidad Salgado Rentaría, who was originally from this place and who was also the first elected governor of the State. On 20 June 1950 Los Reyes was granted the category of City with the name of "Los Reyes de Salgado, Michoacán."

== See also ==
- Municipalities of Mexico
