= Jiquilpan de Juárez =

Human settlement in Mexico

- City
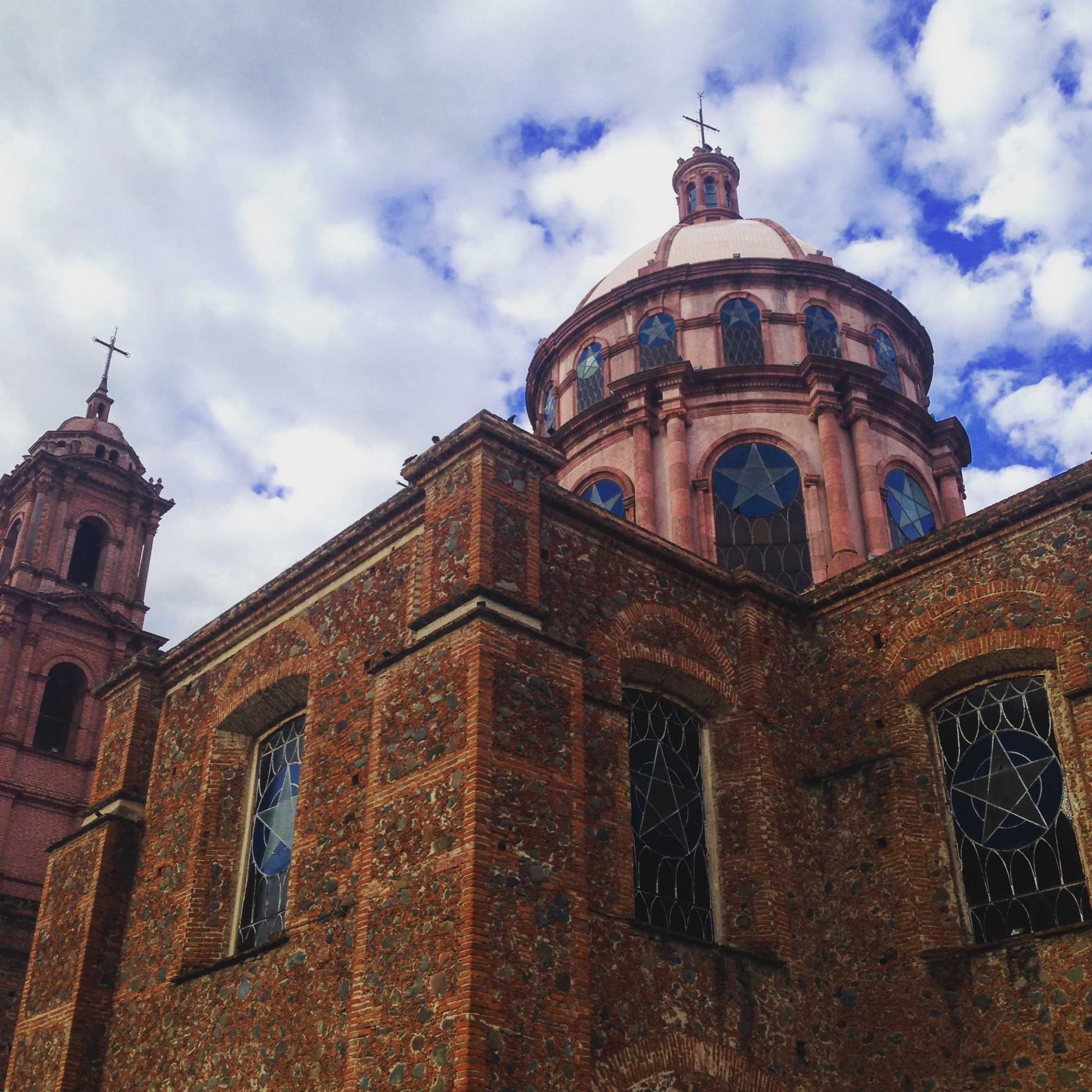
- Iglesia del Sagrado Corazón

- Location within Michoacán Location within Mexico
- Coordinates: 19°59′23″N 102°43′07″W
- Country: Mexico
- State: Michoacán
- Municipality: Jiquilpan

Population (2020)
  - Total: 24,662
- Time zone: UTC-6 (Central (US Central))

Jiquilpan de Juárez is a town of about 25,000 residents in northwest Michoacán, Mexico, near the border with the states of Colima and Jalisco. It is the seat of the municipio of Jiquilpan and the birthplace of president Lázaro Cárdenas who served from 1934–1940. The city is home to the Centro de Estudios de la Revolución Mexicana Lázaro Cárdenas and the Instituto Tecnológico de Jiquilpan.
