= Peribán =

Coordinates: 19°31′N 102°25′W

- Municipality

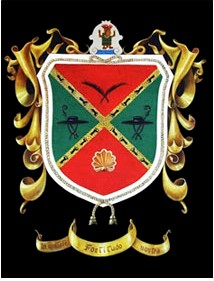
- Coat of arms

- Location in Mexico Peribán (Mexico)
- Country: Mexico
- State: Michoacán

Population (2020)
  - Municipality: 29,389
- Demonym: (in Spanish)
- Time zone: UTC−6 (CST)

Peribán is a municipality in the Mexican state of Michoacán. The municipality has an area of 331.87 square kilometres (0.56% of the surface of the state) and is bordered to the north by the municipality of Los Reyes, to the east by Uruapan, to the southeast by Tancítaro, to the south by Buenavista, and to the west by the state of Jalisco. The municipality had a population of 20,965 inhabitants according to the 2005 census. Its municipal seat is the city of Peribán de Ramos.

In pre-Columbian times Peribán was inhabited by Cuitlatec-speaking people who knew the area as "Place Where They Sew".

== See also ==
- Municipalities of Mexico
