= San Pedro Cahro =

Town in the State of Michoacán, Mexico

Coordinates: 20.1119°N 102.6644°W

- Municipality
- Location in Mexico San Pedro Cahro (Mexico)
- Country: Mexico
- State: Michoacán
- Demonym: (in Spanish)
- Time zone: UTC−6 (CST)

San Pedro Cahro or San Pedro is a town located in North-western part of the state of Michoacan, Mexico in the region of the Chapala Lake. It is formally known as Venustiano Carranza. The town is 170 kilometers from the state capital, Morelia. San Pedro Cahro has an elevation of 1,500 meters above sea level.

The name San Pedro Cahro derives from the town's patron saint and the last name of its original founders; Venustiano Carranza was a land owner and liberal politician who served as President of Mexico from 1917 until his death in 1920. Important spots in the town near the central square include a 17th-century church which has a clock tower. La Plaza is a town square structure that was recently renovated in 2005, which is packed on Sundays and town holidays and El Arco. There is a main farmer's market next to the municipal building and also a supermarket across the street. You can see mountains in the southeast part of town rumored to have a huge cross on a spot were La Virgin de Gaudalupe was seen.

San Pedro Cahro is the hometown to many residents that are scattered all over the US with some concentrations in cities and suburbs like New York, Hawaiian Gardens, California; Chicago, Illinois; Fresno, California; Bakersfield, California; East Los Angeles, California; and Phoenix, Arizona; this is mostly due to the high unemployment in the region, but this little town is kind and people there are friendly, welcoming people.

In July 2017, reports circulated that a volcano might be forming in the Pueblo Viejo community. The reports were based on earth cracks filled with ash that formed in a soccer field. Ground temperatures were measured in excess of 250 °C (482 °F). Experts from the National Autonomous University of Mexico concluded that the high temperatures were caused by composting of buried organic material, not volcanism. The purported volcano was linked with the 20th century volcano Parícutin. Venustiano Carranza is located near the edge of the Michoacán-Guanajuato volcanic field, which includes Parícutin, although Parícutin itself is about 320 kilometres (200 miles) distant.

== Events ==
From 21 to 29 June each year, a 9-day festival is celebrated commemorating the founding of the town and its patron or saint San Pedro. During the Christmas and Holy Week holidays many festivals are celebrated as well.

== See also ==
- Sahuayo, neighboring city
