= Angamacutiro =

- Municipality
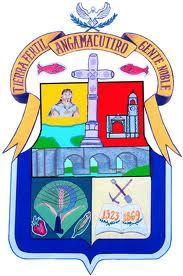
- Coat of arms

- Location of Angamacutiro in Michoacán
- Coordinates: 20°09′N 101°43′W
- Country: Mexico
- State: Michoacán
- Established: 10 December 1831
- Municipal seat: Angamacutiro de la Unión

Area
  - Total: 230.26 km^{2} (88.90 sq mi)

Population (2015)
  - Total: 15,193
  - Density: 65.982/km^{2} (170.89/sq mi)
- Time zone: UTC-6

Angamacutiro is a municipality in the Mexican state of Michoacán. Located in the far north portion of the state, its municipal seat is the city of Angamacutiro de la Unión. The name Angamacutiro originates from the Purepecha language, meaning "place on the edge of the canyon". This name highlights the region's proximity to a canyon's cliff edge, which is a reflection of its geographic features.

== History ==
Among the peoples subdued by the armies of the Purépecha State, is Angamacutiro. In the 16th century, the Spanish conqueror Nuño de Guzmán, when marching at the head of an expedition that was heading towards Nueva Galicia passed through this town, taking possession of it improperly, which caused a dispute, since the commander of Huango (Villa Morelos) claimed Angamacutiro as a parcel. It is common knowledge that the Spanish stumping towards the indigenous population had two characteristics, while Nuño de Guzmán resorted to the sword, instructed the friars Juan de Padilla, Juan de Badillo and Bartolomé de Estrada, to evangelize the population.

Angamacutiro was founded in 1323 by a group of Otomi indigenous people who came from the State of Guanajuato.

The municipality was created on December 10, 1831 by the State Congress, it was the scene of several struggles during the war of intervention in Michoacán. In 1866 there was a confrontation between the imperial forces commanded by Gen. Ramón Méndez and the Republican group known as los chinacos, the latter caused strong setbacks to the forces representing the intervention; in recognition of loyalty to the republic, the State Congress granted it on June 28, 1869, the name of "Villa Unión" is currently known as Angamacutiro de la Unión to its municipal seat.

== Geography ==
Angamacutiro is located in the extreme north of Michoacán, bordering the state of Guanajuato. It is bordered by the municipalities of José Sixto Verduzco to the northeast, Puruándiro to the east, Panindícuaro to the south, Penjamillo to the west and Pénjamo (Guanajuato) to the north. The municipality has a total area of 230.26 square kilometres (88.90 sq mi), representing 0.39% of Michoacán's total area.

The municipality is located where the Trans-Mexican Volcanic Belt meets the lowlands of the Bajío.

The principal river of Angamacutiro is the Lerma River, which marks the state border with Guanajuato. The Angulo River runs north-south through the municipality. All of the smaller streams and rivers are tributaries of these two rivers.

=== Climate and ecosystems ===
Angamacutiro has a humid subtropical climate with rains in the summer. The average annual temperature is between 16 and 24 °C, annual rainfall is between 700 and 800 mm.

Native species include plants such as nopal, huizache and shrubs, and animals such as weasels, rabbits, squirrels, skunks, badgers, turtledoves and ducks.

== Demographics ==
As of the census of 2020, there were 14,943 people residing in the municipality, a 0.18% raise from the 2010 census count; 5,595 men and 6,738 women. 36.6% of the population live in towns of more than 2,500 people. Only 0.2% of the population older than 5 years speak an indigenous language.

31.4% of the population was under the age of 15 and 10.3% were 64 years or older. 45.4% of the population was male.

=== Localities ===
The municipality of Angamacutiro comprises 28 localities. The largest of these municipalities are listed below.

Locality	Population
Angamacutiro de la Unión	5,044
El Maluco	2,006
Miravalle	996
Agua Caliente (Ojo de Agua)	921
Santiago Conguripo	861
