= Sahuayo =

Sahuayo Tzacuātlayotl (Nahuatl languages)
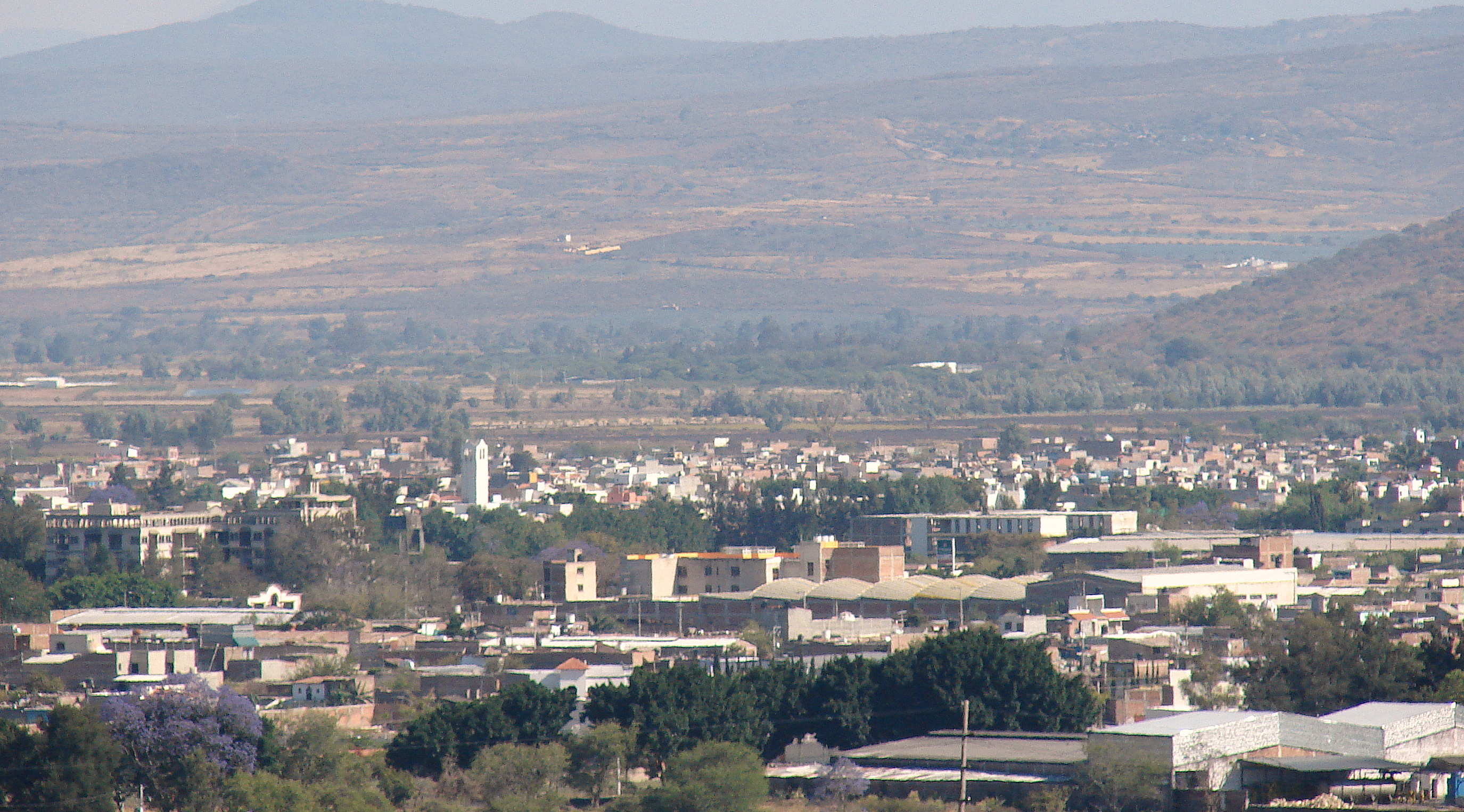
- Aerial view of Sahuayo

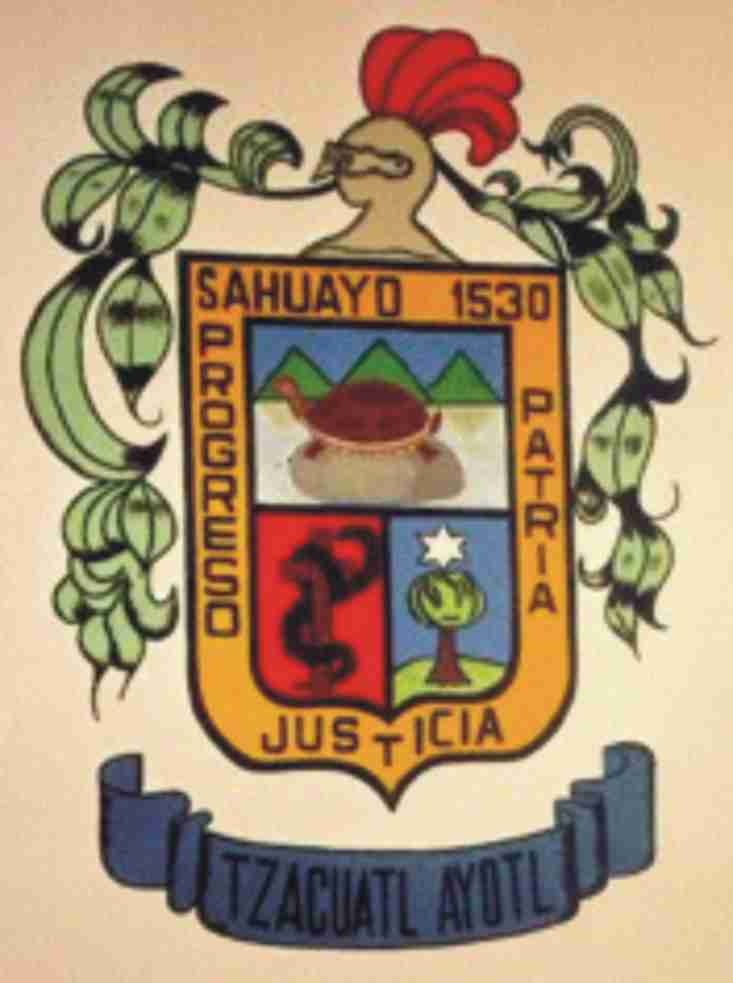
- Coat of arms
- Nickname: Ciudad de los Huaraches
- Motto: Nation, Justice, Progress
- Location within Michoacán Location within Mexico
- Coordinates: 20°3′N 102°44′W
- Country: Mexico
- State: Michoacán
- Boroughs: La Yerbabuena; Rincón de San Andrés; La Puntita; Cerrito Pelon; Forestal; La Limonera; San Isidro; Valle Verde; San Onofre
- Foundation: 1530

Government
  - Type: Municipality

Area
  - Total: 128.05 km^{2} (49.44 sq mi)
- Elevation: 1,561 m (5,121 ft)

Population
  - Total: 78,477 (2020 census)
- Time zone: UTC-6 (Zona Centro)
- Postal code: 59000
- Area code: 353

Sahuayo (Nahuatl: Tzacuātlayotl) is a city in the state of Michoacán, in western Mexico, near the southern shore of Lake Chapala. It serves as the municipal seat for the surrounding municipality of the same name. Sahuayo is an important center for industry and is the center of commerce for the Chapala lake region, specializing in crafts, sandals (huaraches), and hats (sombreros), which are made by Sahuayenses. It is home to the largest huarache in the world measuring 7.45 meters long and 3.09 meters wide. The name means "turtle shaped pot". It has been called the Athens of Michoacán because of the number of important poets, writers, and painters residing there. It is currently the seat of the Arts Propositions Association. In 2005, the census population was 59,316, with the municipality being 61,965. The size of the municipality is 128.05 km^{2} (49.44 sq mi).

As of the Census of 2020, Sahuayo has a population of 78,477.

== Geography ==
=== Location ===
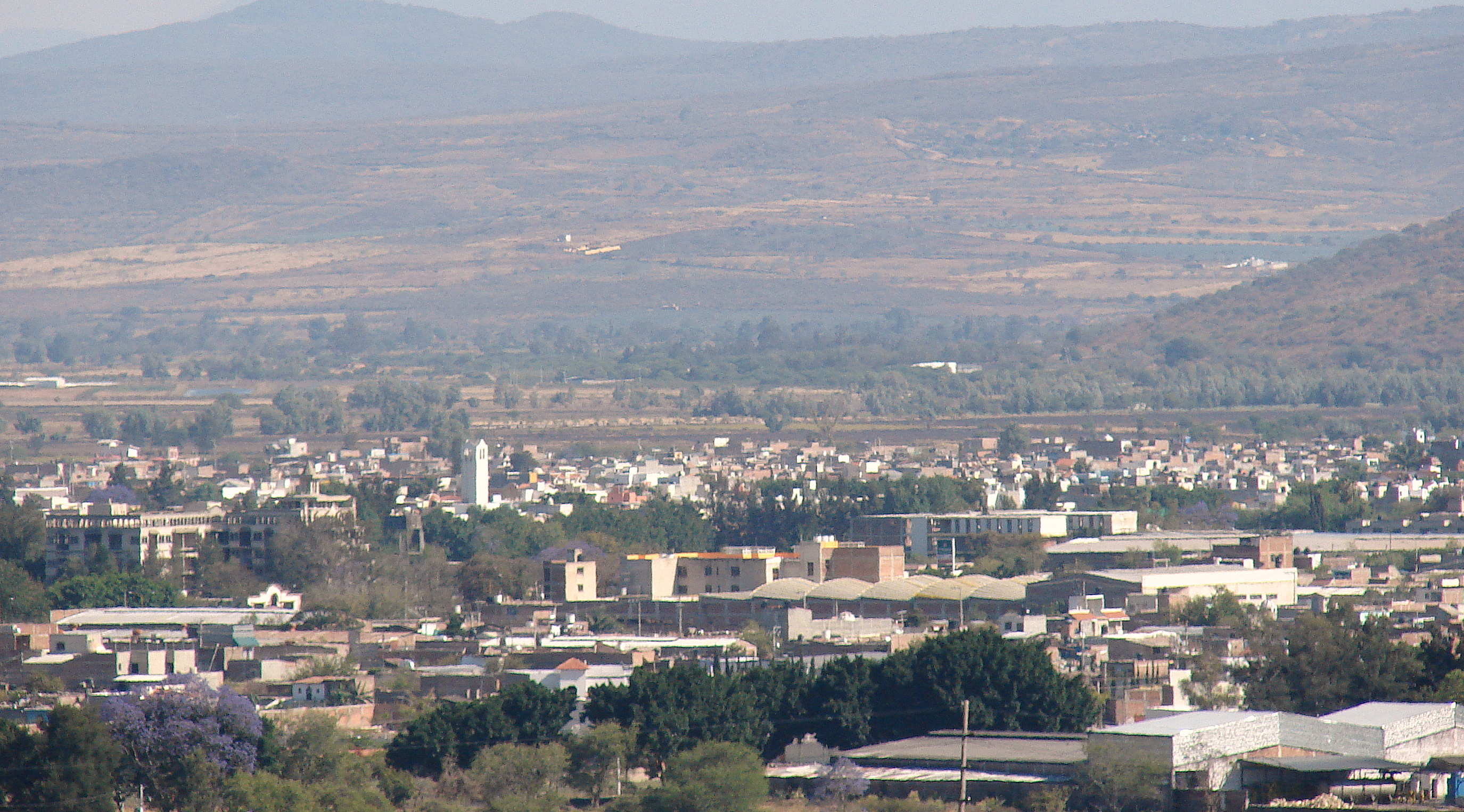
Panorama of Sahuayo

Sahuayo is located to the northwest of the state, at the coordinates 20º03' north latitude and 102º44' west longitude, 1,530 meters above sea level. To the north of the Sahuayo border one finds Venustiano Carranza Michoacán (also known as San Pedro), to the east Villamar, to the south Jiquilpan, and Cojumatlán de Régules to the northwest. Its distance to the State Capital, Morelia.

== Etymology ==
The name Sahuayo comes from the Nahuatl language and is interpreted in many ways. According to Dr. Antonio Peñafiel, the word is made up of two elements: tzacuātl and ayotl, where tzacuātl (pot) is a vase formed by one half of a coconut and "ayotl," which translates into "turtle"; hence vessel turtle or vessel that has the aspect of a turtle.

== Seal ==
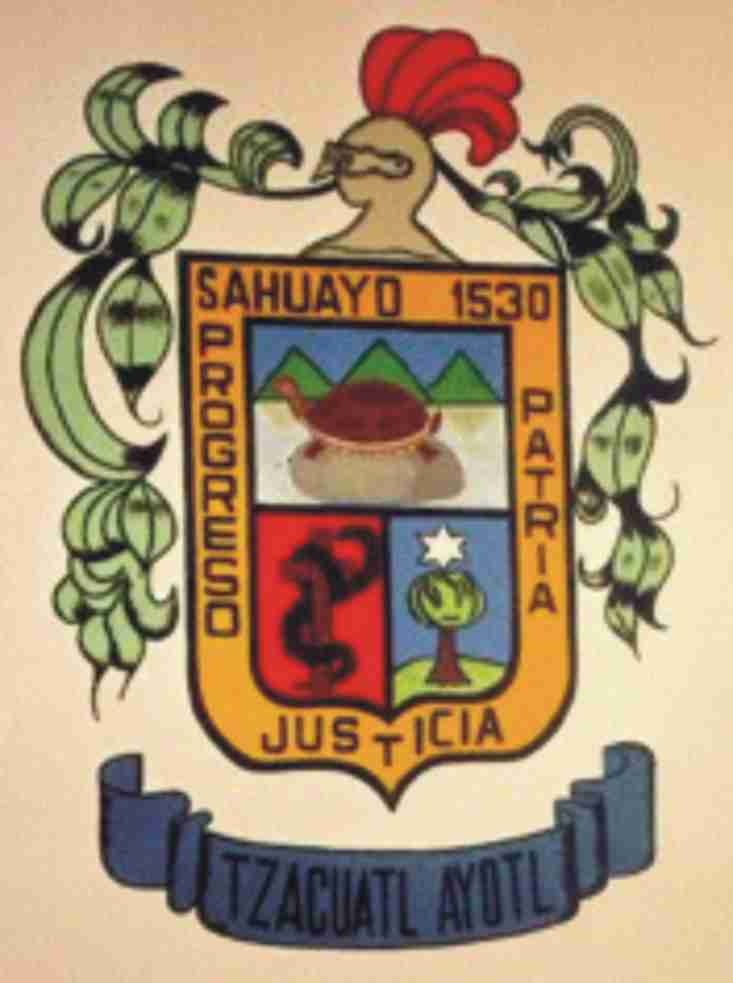
Seal of Sahuayo

On the seal of Sahuayo, there is a turtle on the stone in the first field, which represents the foundation of Sahuayo in 1530. In the background are three hills, which symbolize the three towns that gave origin to Sahuayo, in the second half of the 16th century. These hills can also be considered to represent the three governments: federal, state, and municipal. In the third field, a plumed serpent or Quetzalcoatl god fights with the cross, symbolizing the conquest of Sahuayo by Nuño Beltrán de Guzmán. In the fourth field of the municipal shield is a tree and a star. “Patria, Justicia y Progreso” (Nation, Justice, and Progress) are written in the contour of the shield.

== Notable people ==
- Hector Fajardo – Ex-Major League Baseball player
- Lilia Prado – actress
- Saint José "Joselito" Sánchez del Río – martyr of the Cristero War, canonized by Pope Francis on 16 October 2016

== Sister City ==
- Santa Ana, California, United States
