= Puruándiro =

City and municipality in Michoacán, Mexico

- City and municipality
- Puruándiro de Calderón
- Main square of Puruándiro
- Motto: Ceñiremos la espada sólo para defender la justicia
- Location within Mexico
- Coordinates: 20°05′13″N 101°30′51″W
- Country: Mexico
- State: Michoacán
- Municipality: Puruándiro
- Founded: 1522 (traditional)
- City status: 1858
- Elevation: 1,890 m (6,200 ft)

Population (2020)
  - Total: 69,260
  - Seat (city): 32,333
- Demonym: Puruandirense
- Time zone: UTC−6 (CST)
- Postal code: 58500
- Area code: 438
- Website: puruandiro.gob.mx

Puruándiro (officially Puruándiro de Calderón) is a city and the seat of the municipality of the same name in the north of the Mexican state of Michoacán, on the border with Guanajuato, in the Bajío region. In the 2020 census the city had 32,333 inhabitants and the municipality 69,260. The town is known for its hot springs, which give it its Purépecha name, and for its agricultural and livestock economy.

== Name ==
The name comes from the Purépecha Purhuandirhu, usually translated as "place of hot water" or "place where the water boils", a reference to the thermal springs that surround the town. In the 19th century the city received the official name Puruándiro de Calderón, which still appears in gazetteers and library authority files.

== History ==
Templo Expiatorio de los Ángeles

=== Pre-Hispanic and colonial periods ===
Before the Spanish conquest the area was settled by Chichimeca groups and later came under the control of the Purépecha Empire. The foundation of the colonial town is traditionally attributed to the encomendero Juan de Villaseñor y Orozco around 1522. Archaeological and landscape studies describe Puruándiro as an important settlement in the early decades of the colony, both for central New Spain and for the organisation of the northern frontier zone. During the viceroyalty it became a centre of haciendas that supplied grain and livestock to the mining towns of the Bajío.

=== 19th century ===
Puruándiro recovered quickly after the Mexican War of Independence; in 1822 it had 14,783 inhabitants and in 1831 it was constituted as a municipality. Historian Heriberto Moreno García describes a "Puruándiro region" that, besides the seat, included the municipalities of Angamacutiro, Panindícuaro, Santa Fe del Río and Numarán, together with 21 haciendas and about 130 ranches; the 1825 territorial reorganisation of Michoacán confirmed Puruándiro as one of its municipalities. In 1858 Governor Epitacio Huerta granted it the status of city.

=== 20th century ===
After the Mexican Revolution, Puruándiro was the scene of a long agrarian conflict. In November 1921 Governor Francisco J. Múgica decreed the expropriation of 12,000 hectares of the San Antonio Arce hacienda for the benefit of local farmers.

== Geography ==
Puruándiro seen from space (2025)

The municipality lies entirely within the Trans-Mexican Volcanic Belt (Sierras y Bajíos Michoacanos subprovince), between 1,700 and 2,700 m above sea level, and covers 718.65 km², about 1.22% of the area of Michoacán. It borders José Sixto Verduzco to the north, Morelos to the east and south, Jiménez to the south, Panindícuaro to the south and west, Angamacutiro to the west, and the state of Guanajuato to the north and east.

The landscape consists of the Puruándiro valley surrounded by volcanic hills such as Cerro Grande (Villachuato) and Camatarán. The area belongs to the Lerma–Santiago hydrological region; its main reservoirs are Las Alazanas, La Cofradía, El Tablón, Agua Tibia and La Purísima. The thermal zone of Jeroche (Geroche) contains around twenty hot springs.

The climate is mostly temperate subhumid with summer rains (about 77% of the territory), with average temperatures of 14–20 °C and annual precipitation of 700–1,000 mm. Agriculture occupies about 46% of the municipal surface.

Climate data for Puruándiro, elevation 2,012 m (6,601 ft), (1961–1990)
Month	Jan	Feb	Mar	Apr	May	Jun	Jul	Aug	Sep	Oct	Nov	Dec	Year
Mean daily maximum °C (°F)	23.9 (75.0)	25.7 (78.3)	28.5 (83.3)	30.6 (87.1)	31.5 (88.7)	29.1 (84.4)	26.5 (79.7)	26.3 (79.3)	26.1 (79.0)	26.1 (79.0)	25.5 (77.9)	24.1 (75.4)	27.0 (80.6)
Daily mean °C (°F)	15.3 (59.5)	16.6 (61.9)	19.2 (66.6)	21.4 (70.5)	22.8 (73.0)	21.8 (71.2)	20.2 (68.4)	20.2 (68.4)	20.0 (68.0)	18.9 (66.0)	17.2 (63.0)	15.9 (60.6)	19.1 (66.4)
Mean daily minimum °C (°F)	6.7 (44.1)	7.5 (45.5)	9.9 (49.8)	12.3 (54.1)	14.1 (57.4)	14.5 (58.1)	14.0 (57.2)	13.9 (57.0)	13.7 (56.7)	11.7 (53.1)	8.9 (48.0)	7.7 (45.9)	11.2 (52.2)
Average precipitation mm (inches)	15.0 (0.59)	7.1 (0.28)	9.5 (0.37)	15.6 (0.61)	33.5 (1.32)	138.5 (5.45)	203.3 (8.00)	167.7 (6.60)	127.9 (5.04)	59.2 (2.33)	9.0 (0.35)	14.1 (0.56)	800.4 (31.5)
Average precipitation days (≥ 0.1 mm)	1.5	1.4	1.2	1.7	3.0	10.4	16.0	14.2	9.9	5.0	1.0	1.6	66.9
Source: Servicio Meteorológico Nacional

== Demographics ==
In 2020 the municipality had 69,260 inhabitants (51.9% women, 48.1% men), 2.1% more than in 2010. The National Population Council (CONAPO) projected 71,252 inhabitants for 2024. The city of Puruándiro had 32,333 inhabitants, making it the 16th most populous locality in Michoacán.

Only 230 people aged three or older (0.33%) spoke an indigenous language in 2020, mainly Purépecha (Tarasco), Mazahua and Nahuatl. The illiteracy rate was 8.8%.

Historical population
Year	Pop.	±%
1900	7,733	—
1910	8,899	+15.1%
1921	8,441	−5.1%
1930	8,108	−3.9%
1940	8,643	+6.6%
1950	9,713	+12.4%
1960	11,480	+18.2%
1970	9,956	−13.3%
1980	17,535	+76.1%
1990	24,238	+38.2%
2000	27,428	+13.2%
2010	30,571	+11.5%
2020	32,333	+5.8%
Population of the city (seat). Source: INEGI censuses.

=== Religion ===
The large majority of the population is Roman Catholic, with smaller Protestant and non-religious minorities.

== Municipality ==
The municipality of Puruándiro covers 718.65 km² and comprised 40 localities in 2020. The largest were:

Locality	Population (2020)
Puruándiro (seat)	32,333
Villachuato	4,195
Galeana	2,886
Santa Clara	2,423
Janamuato	2,100
Isaac Arriaga	2,077
Manuel Villalongín	1,836
San Lorenzo	1,651
Las Letras	1,416
El Pilar	1,136

The municipal president for the 2024–2027 term is Víctor Manuel Vázquez Tapia. Besides the town's hot springs, the municipality's heritage includes the 16th-century former hacienda and church of Villachuato.

== Economy ==
The economy is based on agriculture (maize, beans, wheat, sorghum and chickpeas), pig and cattle raising, commerce and footwear workshops. Remittances from migrants in the United States are an important source of income: in the second quarter of 2026 the municipality received US$39.4 million. According to 2020 estimates, 45.5% of the population lived in moderate poverty and 6.3% in extreme poverty.

== Education ==
The Instituto Tecnológico Superior de Puruándiro (ITSP), part of the Tecnológico Nacional de México, is the main higher-education institution. In 2022 it had 554 students; its largest programmes were business management engineering, industrial engineering and food industry engineering.

== Culture and landmarks ==
- Los Arcos thermal spa, the town's best-known attraction.
- Remains of the 18th-century aqueduct built by José Mariano de la Piedra, including the fountains La Sirena, El Moro and the Pila del Agua Potable.
- The Lázaro Cárdenas and Morelos gardens in the historic centre, with busts of José María Morelos and Benito Juárez.
- The Templo Expiatorio de los Ángeles.

Local cuisine includes menudo in red chile, goat birria, lamb in broth, carnitas and the bread known as fruta de horno; the characteristic music is the brass band (banda de viento).
