= Jiquilpan =

- Municipality
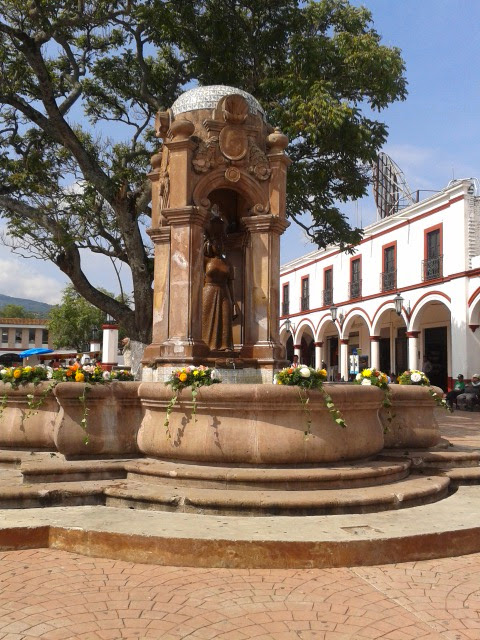
- Fountain of Aguadora

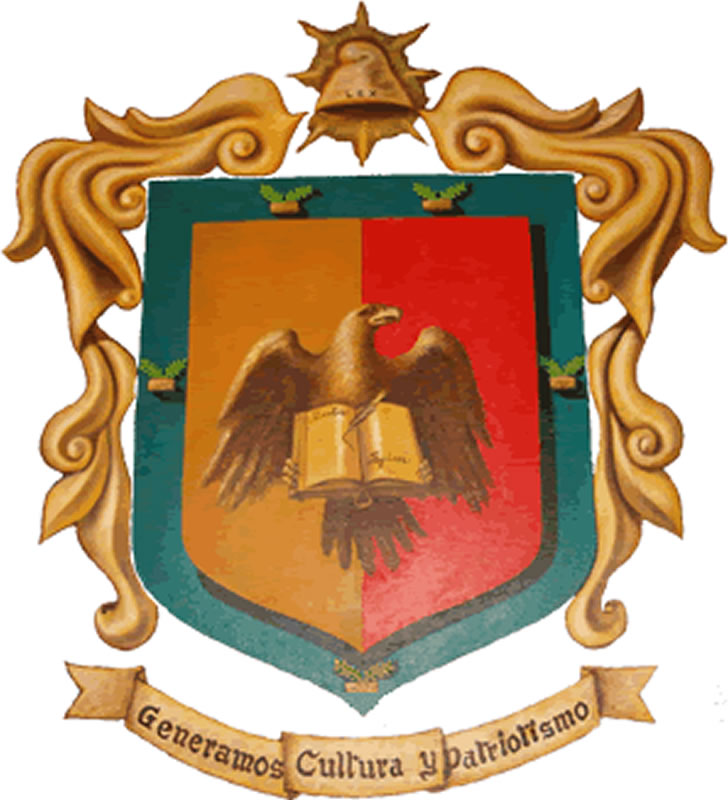
- Coat of arms
- Nickname: Ciudad de las Jacarandas
- Motto: Generamos Cultura y Patriotismo
- Location within Michoacán Location within Mexico
- Coordinates: 19.59°N 102.43°W
- Country: Mexico
- State: Michoacán
- Seat: Jiquilpan de Juárez
- Foundation (municipality): 1831

Government
  - Type: Municipality

Area
  - Total: 242.13 km^{2} (93.49 sq mi)
- Elevation: 1,542 m (5,059 ft)

Population (2020)
  - Total: 36,158
- Time zone: UTC-6 (CST)
- Postal Code: 59510
- Area code: +52 (Mexico) / +353 (Jiquilpan)

Jiquilpan (Spanish: [xiˈkilpan]; also spelled Xiuquilpan, Xiquilpan, Xiquilpa, based on a Náhuatl word for "place of tint plants") is a municipality in the Mexican state of Michoacán. Its municipal seat is Jiquilpan de Juárez.

Jiquilpan is the birthplace of two presidents of the republic: Anastasio Bustamante, who served as President on three occasions in the mid-19th century; and also of one of the most popular presidents of Mexico, Lázaro Cárdenas.

Jiquilpan is the birthplace of Damián Alcázar, actor and movie director, who was in the films El crimen del padre Amaro, La Ley de Herodes, and The Chronicles of Narnia: Prince Caspian, among others. The city is also the birthplace of trumpet virtuoso Rafael Méndez.

It has sister city exchange programs with Indio, California and Palmdale, California in the United States, where large numbers of residents from Jiquilpan relocated to in the 2000s. In the year 2000, the population was 25,778, but estimates can reach as high as 50,000 when seasonal migrant laborers come and stay there.

== See also ==
- Municipalities of Michoacán
- Sahuayo, a neighboring city
- Tourist info
