= 6th federal electoral district of Michoacán =

Federal electoral district of Mexico

Michoacán's 6th
- Electoral district of the Chamber of Deputies of Mexico

- 6th district since 2023

Incumbent
- Member: José Luis Téllez Marín
- Party: ▌Labour Party
- Congress: 66th (2024–2027)

District
- State: Michoacán
- Head town: Ciudad Hidalgo
- Coordinates: 19°41′N 100°33′W
- Covers: 13 municipalities: Álvaro Obregón, Copándaro, Cuitzeo, Charo, Hidalgo, Huandacareo, Indaparapeo, Irimbo, Queréndaro, Santa Ana Maya, Tarímbaro, Tzitzio, Zinapécuaro
- PR region: Fifth
- Precincts: 265
- Population: 457,521 (2020 census)

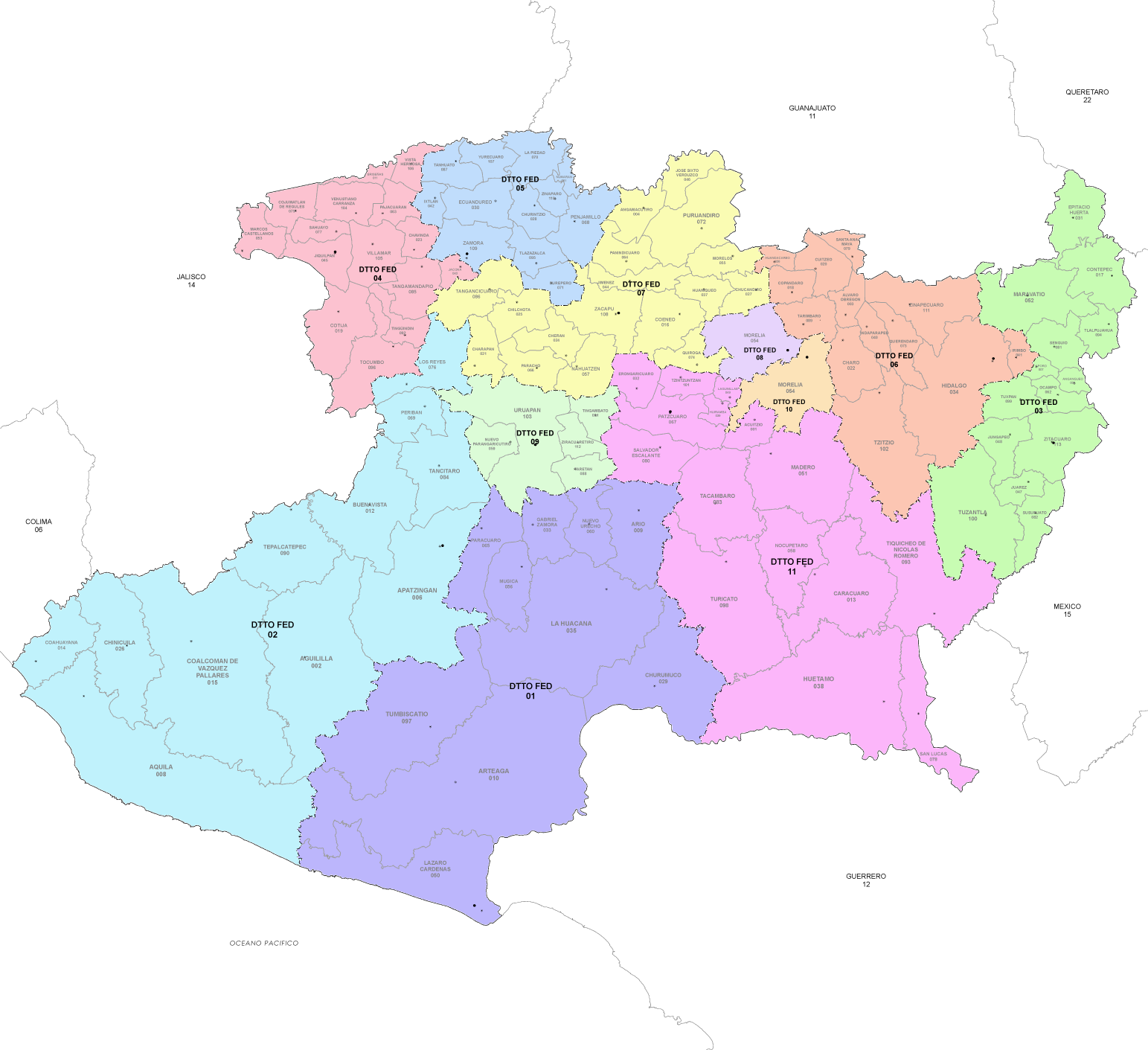
Michoacán's federal electoral districts since 2023

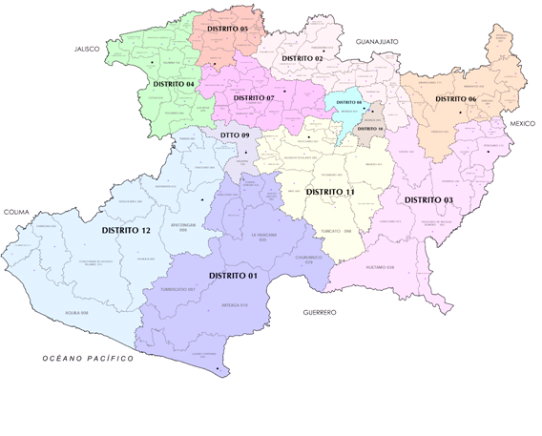
Michoacán under the 2017–2022 districting scheme

The 6th federal electoral district of Michoacán (Spanish: Distrito electoral federal 06 de Michoacán) is one of the 300 electoral districts into which Mexico is divided for elections to the federal Chamber of Deputies and one of 11 such districts in the state of Michoacán.

It elects one deputy to the lower house of Congress for each three-year legislative session by means of the first-past-the-post system. Votes cast in the district also count towards the calculation of proportional representation ("plurinominal") deputies elected from the fifth region.

The current member for the district, elected in the 2024 general election, is José Luis Téllez Marín of the Labour Party (PT).

== District territory ==
Michoacán lost its 12th district in the 2023 districting process carried out by the National Electoral Institute (INE). Under the new districting plan, which is to be used for the 2024, 2027 and 2030 federal elections, the 6th district covers 265 precincts (secciones electorales) across 13 municipalities in the north-east of the state:

- Álvaro Obregón, Copándaro, Cuitzeo, Charo, Hidalgo, Huandacareo, Indaparapeo, Irimbo, Queréndaro, Santa Ana Maya, Tarímbaro, Tzitzio and Zinapécuaro.

The head town (cabecera distrital), where results from individual polling stations are gathered together and collated, is the city of Ciudad Hidalgo. The district reported a population of 457,521 in the 2020 census.

== Previous districting schemes ==
Evolution of electoral district numbers
	1974	1978	1996	2005	2017	2023
Michoacán	9	13	13	12	12	11
Chamber of Deputies	196	300				

2017–2022

Between 2017 and 2022, the district's head town was at Ciudad Hidalgo and it comprised nine municipalities:
- Aporo, Contepec, Epitacio Huerta, Hidalgo, Irimbo, Maravatío, Queréndaro, Senguio and Tlalpujahua.

2005–2017

Under the 2005 districting plan, Michoacán lost its 13th district. The 6th district's head town was at Ciudad Hidalgo and it covered a slightly different set of nine municipalities:
- Contepec, Epitacio Huerta, Hidalgo, Irimbo, Maravatío, Queréndaro, Senguio, Tlalpujahua and Zinapécuaro.

1996–2005

Under the 1996 districting plan, the district's head town was at Ciudad Hidalgo and it comprised eight municipalities:
- Charo, Hidalgo, Indaparapeo, Irimbo, Maravatío, Queréndaro, Tzitzio and Zinapécuaro.

1978–1996

The districting scheme in force from 1978 to 1996 was the result of the 1977 electoral reforms, which increased the number of single-member seats in the Chamber of Deputies from 196 to 300. Under the reforms, Michoacán's allocation rose from 9 to 13. The 6th district's head town was at Uruapan in the centre-west of the state and it was composed of seven municipalities:
- Gabriel Zamora, Nuevo Parangaricutiro, Nuevo Urecho, Taretan, Tingambato, Uruapan and Ziracuaretiro.

== Deputies returned to Congress ==
(Mexico) National parties
- Current
- PAN
- PRI
- PT
- PVEM
- MC
- Morena
- PAZ
- Somos
- Defunct or local only
- PLM
- PNR
- PRM
- PNM
- PP
- PPS
- PARM
- PFCRN
- CON
- PANAL
- PSD
- PES
- PES
- PRD

Michoacán's 6th district
Election	Deputy	Party	Term	Legislature
1916	Onésimo López Couto		1916–1917	Constituent Congress of Querétaro
...
1979	Rafael Ruiz Béjar	Institutional Revolutionary Party	1979–1982	51st Congress
1982	Rubén Vargas Martínez	National Action Party (Mexico)	1982–1985	52nd Congress
1985	Rafael Ruiz Béjar	Institutional Revolutionary Party	1985–1988	53rd Congress
1988	Kuri Francisco Pérez Fernández	Authentic Party of the Mexican Revolution	1988–1991	54th Congress
1991	Anacleto Mendoza Maldonado	Institutional Revolutionary Party	1991–1994	55th Congress
1994	Agustín Martínez Maldonado	Institutional Revolutionary Party	1994–1997	56th Congress
1997	María de los Ángeles Gaytán Contreras	Institutional Revolutionary Party	1997–2000	57th Congress
2000	Mario Cruz Andrade	Party of the Democratic Revolution	2000–2003	58th Congress
2003	Margarito Fierros Tano	Party of the Democratic Revolution	2003–2006	59th Congress
2006	Raúl Ríos Gamboa	Party of the Democratic Revolution	2006–2009	60th Congress
2009	Emiliano Velázquez Esquivel	Party of the Democratic Revolution	2009–2012	61st Congress
2012	Luis Olvera Correa	Institutional Revolutionary Party	2012–2015	62nd Congress
2015	Norberto Antonio Martínez Soto	Party of the Democratic Revolution	2015–2018	63rd Congress
2018	Anita Sánchez Castro	National Regeneration Movement	2018–2021	64th Congress
2021	Berenice Juárez Navarrete	National Action Party (Mexico)	2021–2024	65th Congress
2024	José Luis Téllez Marín	Labour Party (Mexico)	2024–2027	66th Congress

== Presidential elections ==
Michoacán's 6th district
Election	District won by	Party or coalition	%
2018	Andrés Manuel López Obrador	Juntos Haremos Historia	45.8265
2024	Claudia Sheinbaum Pardo	Sigamos Haciendo Historia	51.4006
