= Luís Correa =

Luís or Luis Correa may refer to:

- Luis Correa (boxer) (1897–1949), Chilean boxer
- Luís Correa (footballer), Spanish footballer
- Luis Correa Prieto (1910–1996), Chilean politician
- Luis Fernando Correa Bahamon (born 1955), Colombian businessman, philanthropist, and investor
- Lou Correa (Jose Luis Correa) (born 1958), American businessman and politician
- Luis Olvera Correa (born 1970), Mexican politician

== See also ==
- Luizão Corrêa (Luiz Corrêa de Jesus) (born 1973), Brazilian beach volleyball player
