= Las Tinajas =

Las Tinajas may refer to:

== Places ==
Mexico

- Las Tinajas, Zinapécuaro, a village in Michoacán
  - Las Tinajas massacre, massacre in the above village

United States

- Las Tinajas de Los Indios, tinajas in Antelope Valley
