= Ciudad Hidalgo, Michoacán =

Ciudad Hidalgo Taximaroa
- City
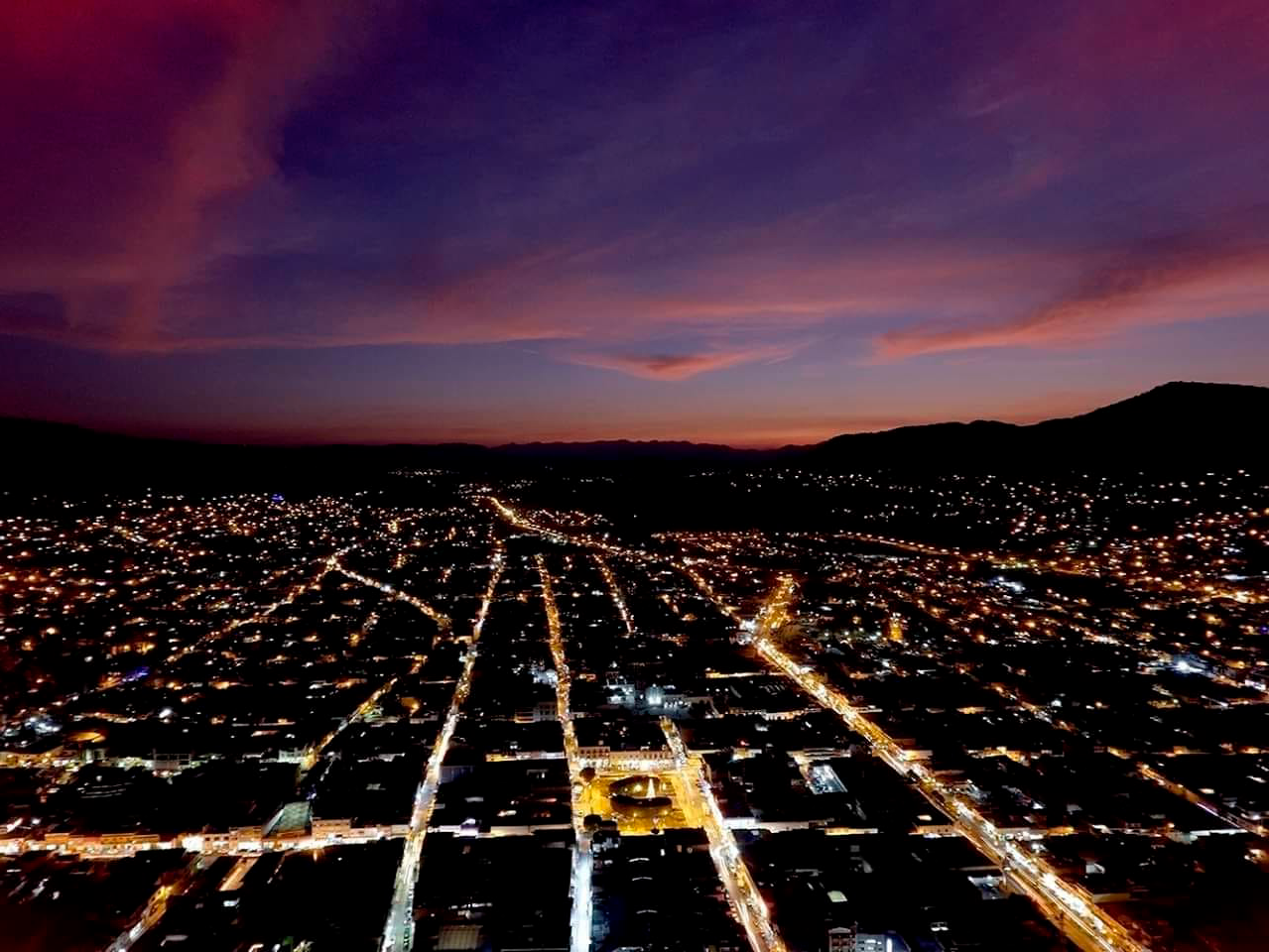
- Aerial view of the downtown and west side of the city.

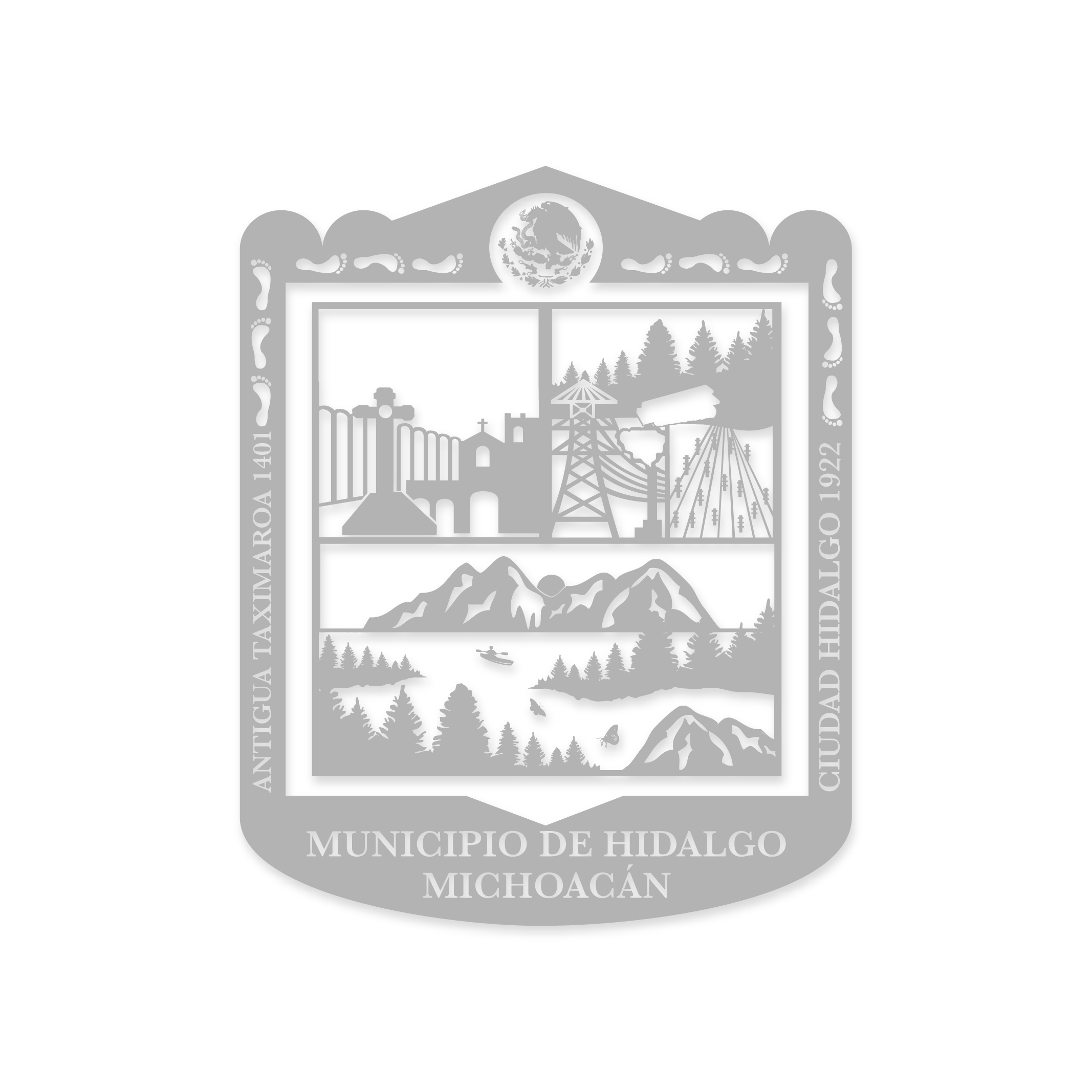
- Coat of arms

- Location in Mexico
- Coordinates: 19°41′30″N 100°33′13″W
- Country: Mexico
- State: Michoacán
- Municipality: Hidalgo
- Founded: 1531 (Spanish settlement)
- Municipality Founded: 1831

Government
  - Municipal President: José Luis Téllez Marín

Area
  - City: 1,063.06 km^{2} (410.45 sq mi)
- Elevation (of seat): 2,060 m (6,760 ft)

Population (2020) Municipality
  - City: 115,035
  - Density: 11,535/km^{2} (29,880/sq mi)
  - Seat: 71,528
- Time zone: UTC-6 (Central (US Central))
- Postal code (of seat): 61100
- Website: (in Spanish) Web site

Ciudad Hidalgo, or simply Hidalgo, is a city and municipal seat of the Municipality of Hidalgo in the far northeast of the state of Michoacán, Mexico. It is a city located in a rural, mountainous area. While most of the city consists of modern buildings, its principal monument is the 16th-century church and former monastery of San José. Formerly, its name was Taximaroa, and it was the part of the Purépecha Empire closest to the Aztec Empire. This prompted two unsuccessful Aztec invasions as well as the first Spanish incursion into Purépecha lands in 1522. For both the city and rural communities around it, forestry and furniture making are important parts of the economy, but deforestation is forcing the area to look into alternatives such as tourism to take advantage of its natural resources and cultural sites.

== The city ==
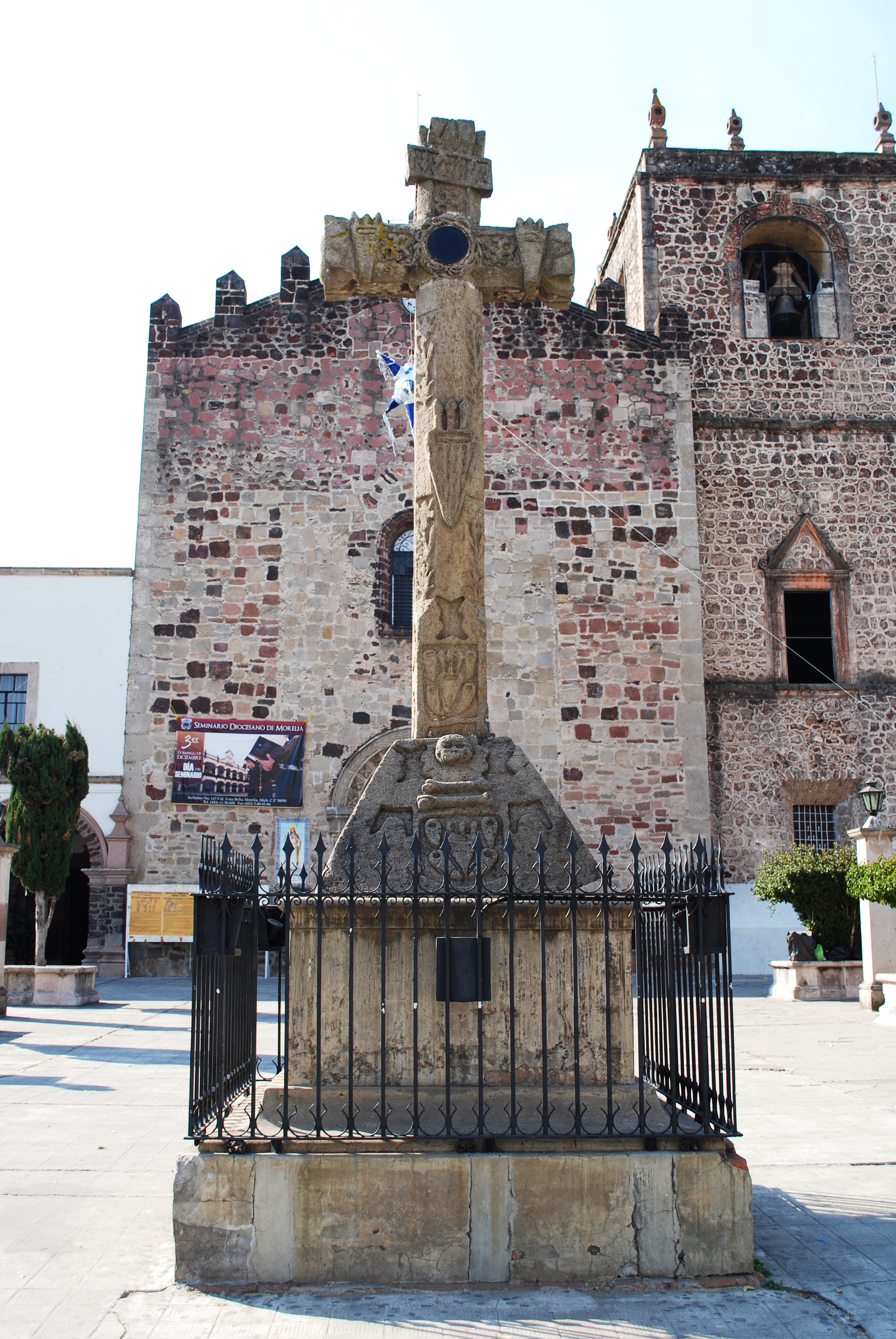
San José parish

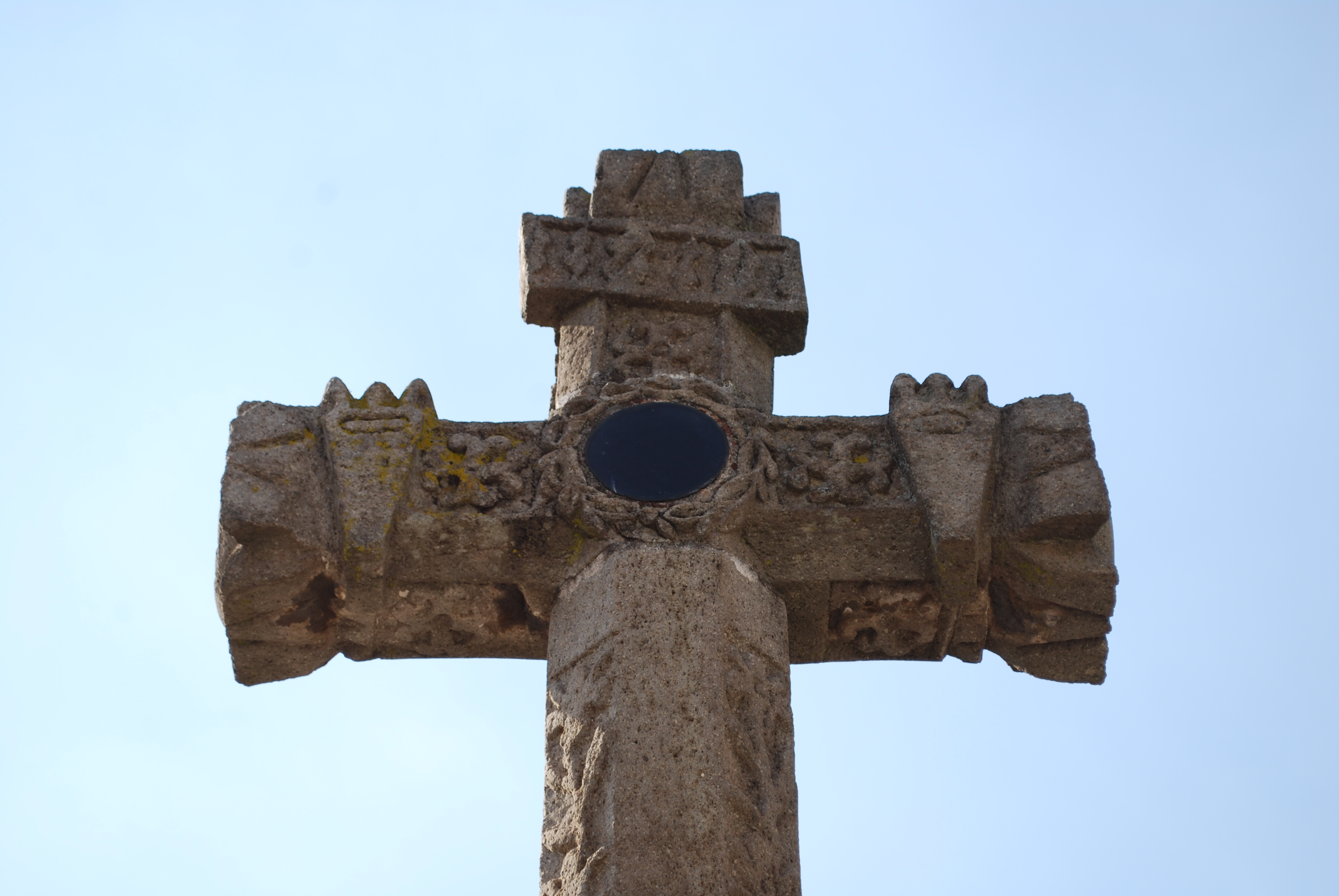
Close-up of atrium cross showing the obsidian mirror

Today, the city has mostly modern construction and streets, as one of Michoacán's ten principal municipalities. However, it retains some of its rural character, especially economically. The city holds an annual fair dedicated to preserved fruits and vegetables during Holy Week, featuring home-made preserves of fruits and vegetables. Foods of this type have been made in this area since the beginning of the 20th century. The city is also host to the largest furniture exposition in Michoacán, the Expo Mueble and the Expo Feria de Todos los Santos is related to Day of the Dead and All Saints Day.

Its principal monument is a 16th-century church with a former monastery. It conserves its atrium and original monolithic atrium cross sculpted by indigenous hands. This cross rests on a pyramidical base with a skull and bones. It also contains the coat of arms of the Franciscan order. The pyramidical base and skulls display an indigenous influence, as does the obsidian mirror located on the cross itself which was the symbol of the god Tezcatlipoca (god with the sacrificed foot) who was worshiped by both the Aztecs and the Purépecha. The church contains two notable baptismal fonts. The larger one may have been the basin of a pre-Hispanic public fountain from the 16th century. It is decorated with small angels and stylized lions. There are also letters on the rim of the font, but they do not spell out words. Tradition says they were used to teach literacy. The smaller font is monolithic and contains the image of a small nude angel in Renaissance style but with some medieval aspects.

One other important church is the Nuestra Señora del Perpetuo Socorro (Our Lady of Perpetual Succour). It is located just outside the urban center. The work was inaugurated in 1977 and takes on a red color from the brick used in its construction. It is a modern construction with geometric lines.

The Casa de la Cultura (Cultural Center) of the city offers classes in dance, flower arranging, painting, textiles, computers, music and more for adults and children.

== The Municipality of Hidalgo ==
Municipal Palace of Hidalgo

As municipal seat, Ciudad Hidalgo is the local government for over 500 other communities in the area, which together make up a territory of 1,063.06km2. Over half of the municipal population of 110,311 (2005) lives in the city proper. The main settlement is Ciudad Hidalgo which is the center for forestry and commerce. Agostitlán, El Caracol Puente de Tierra, San Antonio Villalongin and Huajúmbaro which are all dedicated to forestry. San Matías is dedicated to agriculture and crafts, and San Bartolo Cuitareo and Jose Maria Morelos is dedicated to agriculture and forestry. As of 2005, the municipality had 155 people who spoke an indigenous language. Most indigenous are Otomi who mostly live in San Matías and San Bartolo Cuitareo. It is located in the far east of the state, 104 km from the state capital of Morelia. It borders the municipalities of Queréndaro, Zinapécuaro, Maravatío, Irimbo, Tuxpan, Jungapeo, Tuzantla, Tequicheo, Tzitzio, Indaparapeo and Charo .

The city is located in a relatively flat valley surrounded by mountains. These mountains are populated with pines, oyamels, holm oak and other kinds of trees. The climate ranges from a semi moist and temperate to semi moist and semi cold with rains in the summer. Average temperature ranges from 8 to 20C and between 1000 and 1500mm per year. The municipality is part of the Trans-Mexican Volcanic Belt, with the Sierra de Mil Cumbres. Principle peaks include Del Fraile, Azul, San Andres, Ventero, Guangoche and Blanco. Rivers include Agostitlan, Chaparro, Zarco and Grande with dams called Sabaneta, Pucuato and Mata de Pinos. Fauna include coyote, foxes, skunks, opossum, hares, rabbits, raccoons, armadillos, ducks and other fowl. The Cerro San Andres is home to one of the colonies of monarch butterflies although it is not part of the Biosphere Reserve.

Just outside the city proper there are caves called the Grutas de Tziranda (tziranda means paper in Purépecha). These caves run for about 300 meters with thousands of formations in calcite, coral, calcium carbonate and plant fossils. Within the caves, about twenty species of bats reproduce. The caverns are illuminated and have speakers within playing music for visitors.

The Los Azufres Park is known for its thermal waters heated by an inactive volcano. The site extends over 1319,15km2 with an altitude that varies between 2950 and 3200masl, near San Pedro Jácuaro. The springs have been attributed with medical powers since the pre Hispanic period. A number of spas have been established in the area such as Laguna Larga, San Alejo, Doña Celia, Campamento Turístical Los Azufres, Tejamaniles, and Eréndira. The tranquil waters of Laguna Larga reflect the green of the trees around them. Laguna Verde is colored by the sulfur it contains. In a number of places there are craters where mud boils. In Laguna Los Azufres the water is very hot and contains a large quantity of dissolved minerals including sulfur. There are also geysers and fresh water springs. It is not a national park but Semarnat has a project to declare it a protected area. Problems with the area include deforestation and trash. The geothermic energy of the area is used to generate electricity. There are various hotels, spas and other businesses which offer activities such as camping, cycling, rowing, swimming and hiking.

Forestry and wood products are an important part of the economy for both the city and the rest of the municipality. However, deforestation has become a problem. According to municipal president Jose Luis Avila Franco, the development of tourism is important for the entity to take advantage of as is its natural resources as to lead it away from an overdependence on forestry. However, tourism only accounts for three percent of the economy currently. Industry accounts for about thirty percent of the economy and include the production of processed foods, metals, furniture and textiles. About twenty percent of the economy is based on agriculture and livestock. Crops include corn, wheat, tomatoes, fava beans, garlic, peaches, apples, quinces, capulins, maguey for pulque, avocado, apricots and sapotes. Livestock includes domestic fowl, cows, pigs, goats, horses, donkeys, mules, and bees. There are deposits of non-metallic minerals such as lime, clay, kaolin, sulfur and others. Most of the rest is accounted for by commerce. Ninety percent of commercial establishments are small and family owned. However, in 2009 and 2010, the poor economy forced the closing of dozens of small businesses in the city center alone.

== History ==
The original name of the settlement and the area was Taximaroa. The origin of this name is unclear. Some sources claim some variation of this had been the name since Toltec times, but this form is from the Purépecha language. The meaning is similarly unclear. It may mean “altar of the god’s put on the road” in reference to a place where the Purépecha defeated the Aztecs. Another source says it means “place of carpenters,” but the Aztec name for the place Tlaximaloyan, means this and was probably given due to is similarity with the Purépecha name. Another source states that the name means “place of traitors.” This etymology stems from Conquest. Cristobal de Olid was on his way west to Tzintzuntzan when an Purépecha army was heading east to intercept him. Olid, along with a number of Purépecha from this area, tricked the army into an ambush and captured them. After the Conquest, the name changed to San José Taximaroa. Near the end of the 18th century, a hacienda was acquired here by Miguel Hidalgo y Costilla. This later prompted the name of the municipality to change to Villa Hidalgo Taximaroa in 1908, and then again to Ciudad Hidalgo in 1922.

The first people to concentrate in this area were the Otomi, who arrived between 2,000 and 1,500 years B.C.E. They called the area “Ouesehuarape” or “place where they cut wood.” In 1401, the Purépecha conquered the area, making it the province closest to the Aztec Empire. In 1479, Axayacatl with 24,000 warriors attacked Taximaroa and burned the city. They were later expelled by the Purépecha and the town was refounded. The Aztecs attacked again under Moctezuma II in 1495 but were defeated. A ceremonial center was then erected by the Purépecha to mark the defeat of the Aztecs.

In 1522, the Spanish under Cristóbal de Olid arrived here entering Purépecha lands. Olid took possession of the native settlement and had the first Mass celebrated in Purépecha territory here. Before the arrival of Nuño de Guzmán in 1529, the locals decided to abandon the settlement of Taximaroa. The Franciscans arrived to the area in 1531 to evangelize the natives and reestablished the settlement, giving it the Spanish layout it has today. In 1535, the settlement and the lands around it were granted to Gonzalo de Salazar as the Taximaroa encomienda by Hernán Cortés when he visited the area. Cortés also had a hospital built for the natives. In 1591, it became a semi-autonomous “Indian Republic” and seat for the region. Later that decade, the parish of San José was founded and the church/monastery complex begun.

After Independence, in 1831, the area became the municipality of Taximaroa. The French under Coronel Clinchant attacked the town in 1864 and later the same year a group of Conservatives were shot in the church atrium. During the Mexican Revolution, federal troops attacked the town, and in 1913, rebel general Alfredo Elizondo passed through. In 1914, a battle called the Sabaeta Action (La Acción de Sabaneta) took place in which troops under Venustiano Carranza triumphed. After the Revolution, the settlement gained city status, changing its name to Ciudad Hidalgo. In 1928 and 1929, confrontations related to the Cristero War took place.

Like much of the rest of the state of Michoacán, problems related to drug trafficking have stood out in the city's recent history. In 2010, the mayor of the city Jose Luis Avila Franco was arrested by federal authorities, along with a number of other mayors in the state with suspected ties to drug traffickers but later a court ruled the evidence insufficient. In the same year, the chief of municipal police was murdered along with a deputy with a note left behind indicating it was the work of drug traffickers.

== Demographics ==
Ciudad Hidalgo has a population of 71,528 inhabitants in 2020 according to data from the XIV Population and Housing Census carried out by the National Institute of Statistics and Geography (INEGI), making it the 8th most populated city in Michoacán. It also the second most populated city in the Eastern Zone of Michoacán, only below the city of Heroica Zitácuaro.
