= General Francisco Mujica International Airport =

International airport serving Morelia, Michoacán, Mexico

Morelia International Airport Aeropuerto Internacional de Morelia
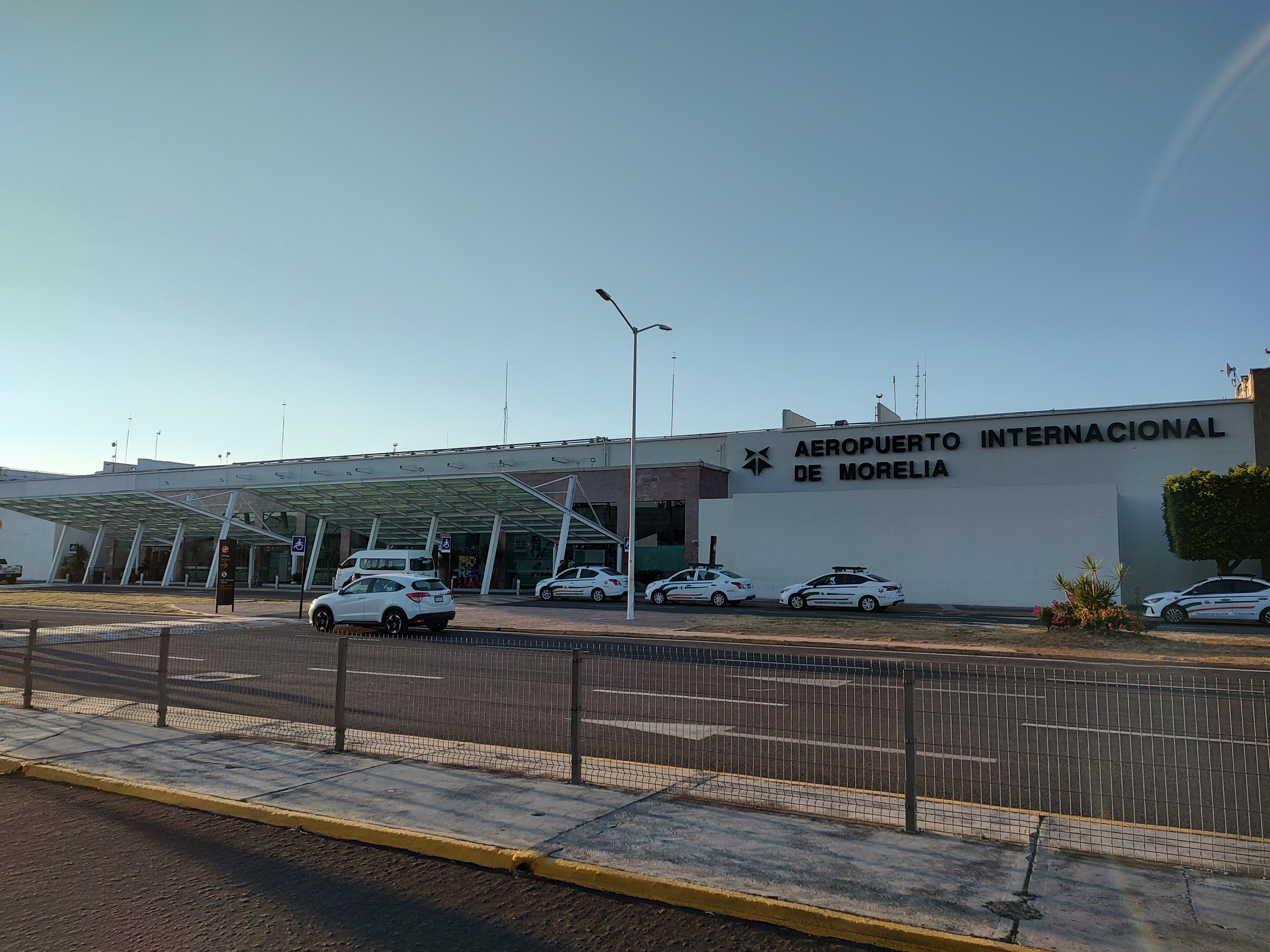
- IATA: MLM; ICAO: MMMM

Summary
- Airport type: Public
- Operator: Grupo Aeroportuario del Pacífico
- Serves: Morelia, Michoacán, Mexico
- Location: Álvaro Obregón, Michoacán, Mexico
- Opened: 1984
- Time zone: CST (UTC−06:00)
- Elevation AMSL: 1,839 m (6,033 ft)
- Coordinates: 19°51′00″N 101°01′32″W
- Website: www.aeropuertosgap.com.mx/en/morelia-3.html

Map
- Location of the airport in Michoacán MLM (Mexico)

Runways
Direction	Length		Surface
Direction	m	ft	Surface
05/23	3,408	11,181	Asphalt

Statistics (2025)
- Total passengers: 1,508,100
- Ranking in Mexico: 21st ▲1
- Source: Grupo Aeroportuario del Pacífico

Morelia International Airport (Spanish: Aeropuerto Internacional de Morelia); officially Aeropuerto Internacional General Francisco J. Mujica (General Francisco J. Mujica International Airport) (IATA: MLM, ICAO: MMMM) is an international airport located in Álvaro Obregón, Michoacán, Mexico. It serves the Metropolitan Area of Morelia, Michoacán, and is the largest airport in the state of Michoacán. In addition to providing domestic flights within Mexico, it serves as a gateway for international travel, connecting Central Mexico to multiple destinations in the United States.

The airport also supports various tourism, flight training, and general aviation activities. It is named in honor of former Governor of Michoacán Francisco José Múgica and it is operated by Grupo Aeroportuario del Pacífico. In 2022, the airport reached the million-passenger milestone for the first time; in 2024 the traffic was 1,304,600 passengers and 1,508,100 in 2025, ranking as the ninth-busiest airport in Mexico for international passenger traffic.

== History ==
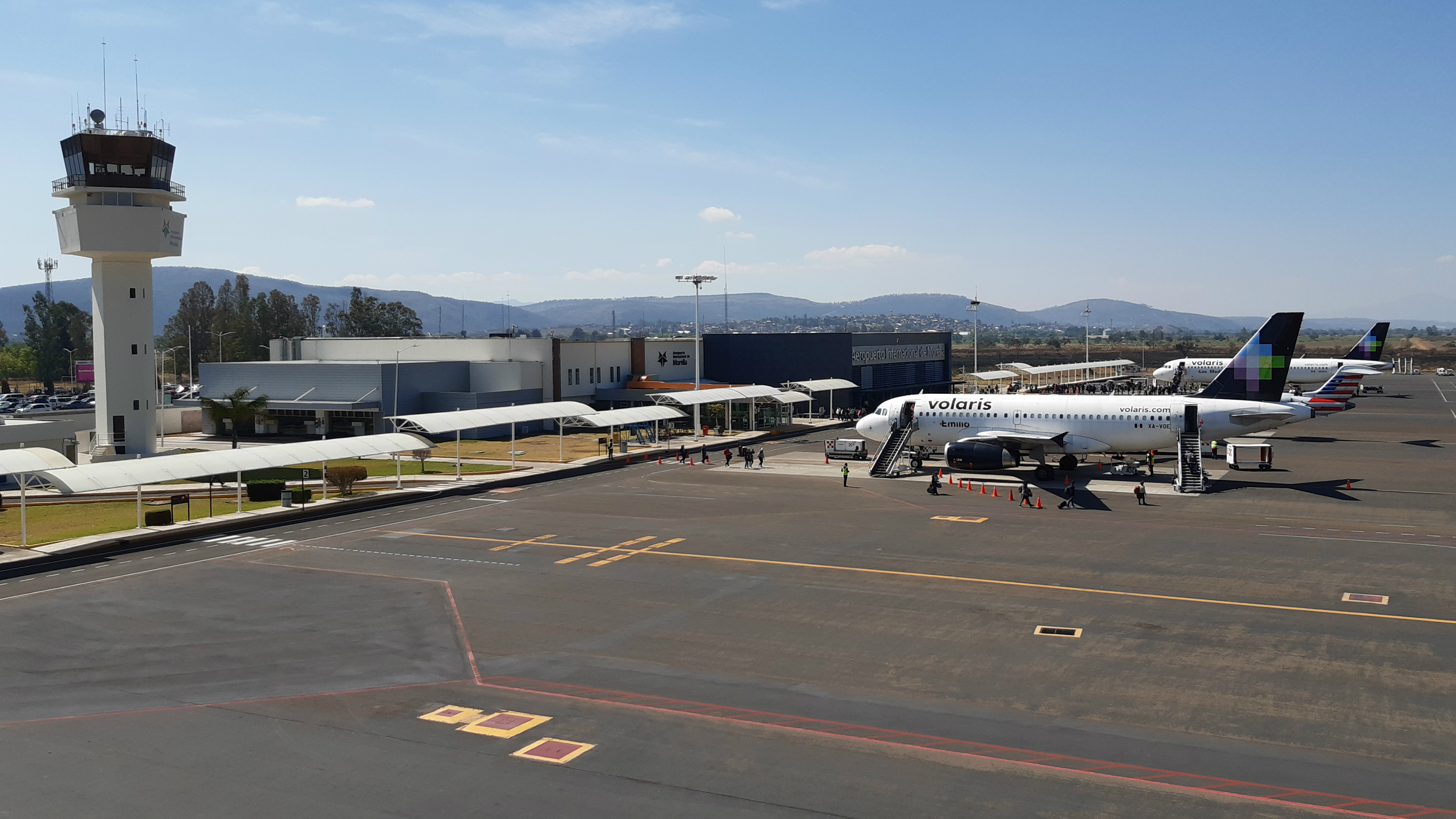
Passenger terminal airside ramp

The airport began its operations in 1984, initially offering only one daily flight using a DC-9 aircraft to Mexico City. Over the years, it has been served by various airlines, including Aero California, Aero Sudpacífico, Aeromar, Aviacsa, Avolar, Líneas Aéreas Azteca, Continental (now United), Mexicana, TAESA, and TAR. In 2019, the airport underwent expansion efforts to enhance its capabilities. During the same year, Volaris established a crew base at the airport to support its growing number of flight routes connecting Morelia to destinations within Mexico and the United States.

== Facilities ==
The airport is located at an elevation of 1,839 metres (6,033 ft) above mean sea level. It has a single runway, designated as 05/23, which measures 3,408 metres (11,181 ft) in length and is surfaced with asphalt.

The commercial aviation apron covers an area of 40,284 square metres (433,610 sq ft) and includes nine stands for receiving narrow-body aircraft. The general aviation apron has a total area of 12,060 square metres (129,800 sq ft) and offers twelve stands for fixed-wing aircraft along with two heliports for private aviation and occasional use by third-level commercial aviation.

The passenger terminal is a single-story building that accommodates both arrivals and departures for domestic and international flights. It features a departure concourse with four gates without jetbridges, a VIP lounge, check-in areas, security zones, baggage claim areas, an arrivals hall, car rental services, taxi stands, and various retail stores. Adjacent to the terminal, other facilities include a hotel, parking areas, civil aviation hangars, and designated spaces for general aviation.

== Airlines and destinations ==
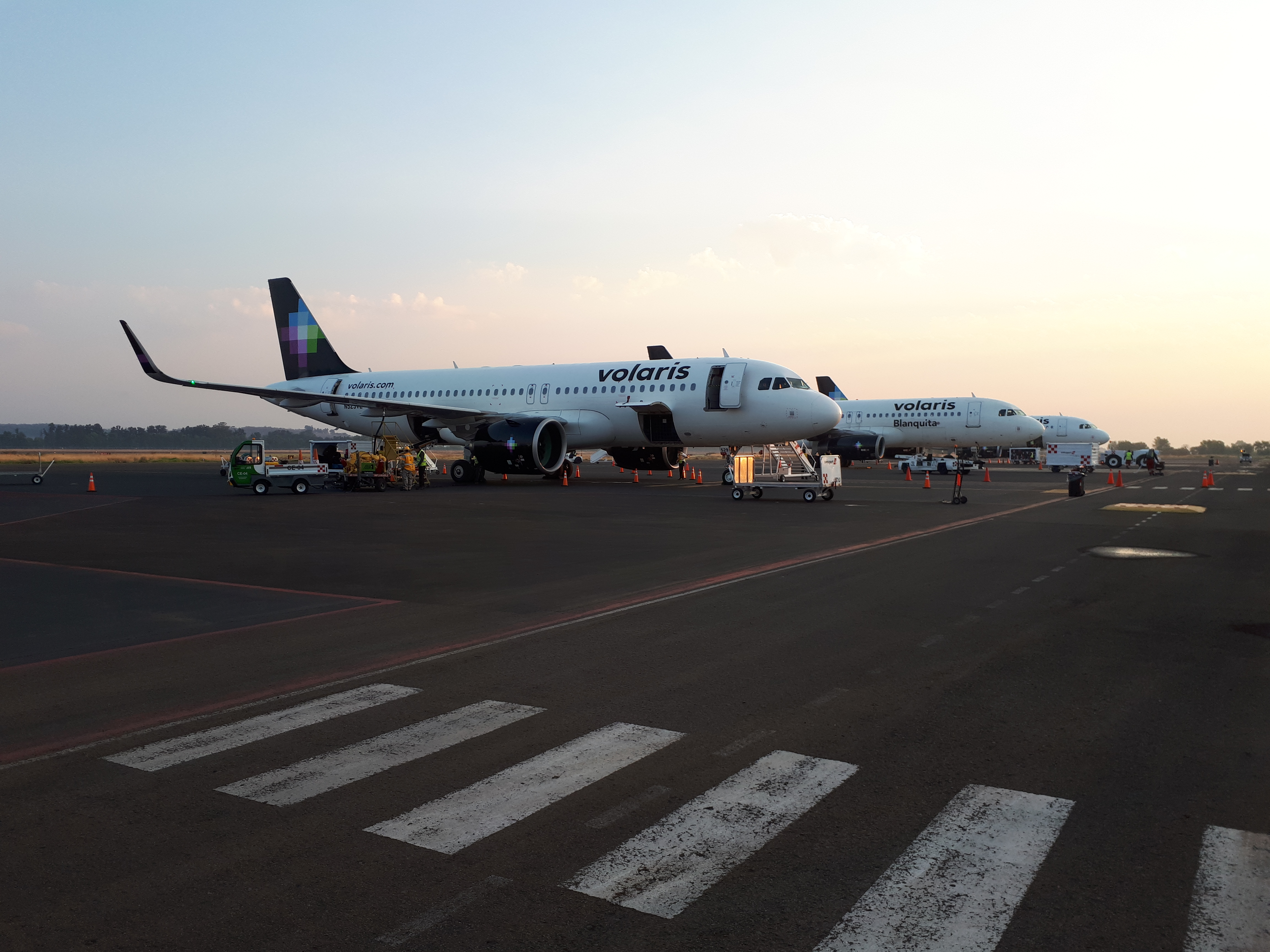
Volaris is the largest operator at Morelia International Airport

=== Passenger ===
Airlines	Destinations
Aeroméxico Connect	Mexico City–Benito Juárez
American Airlines	Dallas/Fort Worth
United Express	Houston–Intercontinental
Viva	Chicago–O'Hare, Monterrey, Tijuana
Volaris	Cancún, Chicago–Midway, Chicago–O'Hare, Dallas/Fort Worth, Fresno, Houston–Intercontinental, Los Angeles, Monterrey, Oakland, Ontario (CA), Sacramento, San Antonio, San Jose (CA), Tijuana

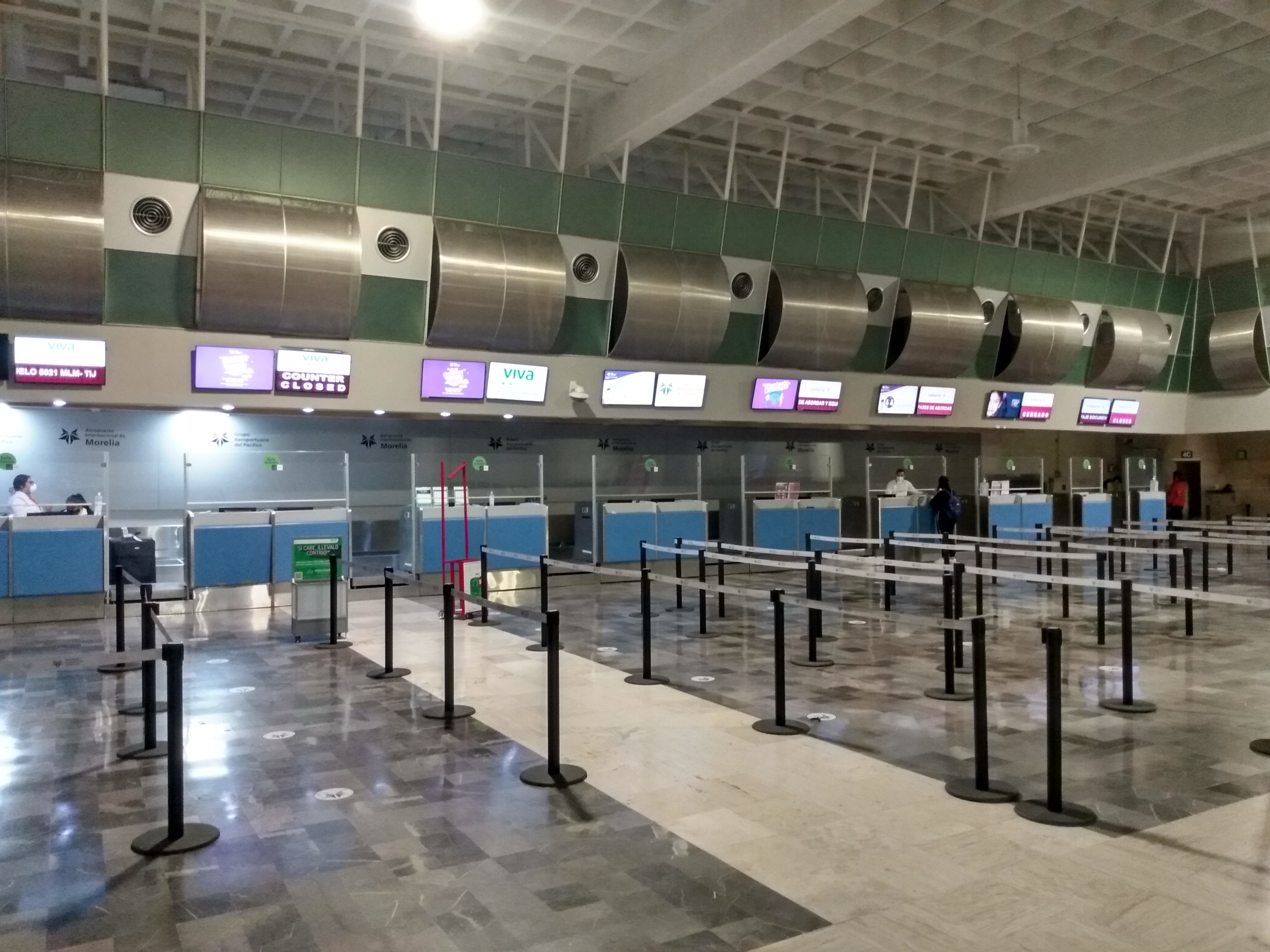
Check-in area

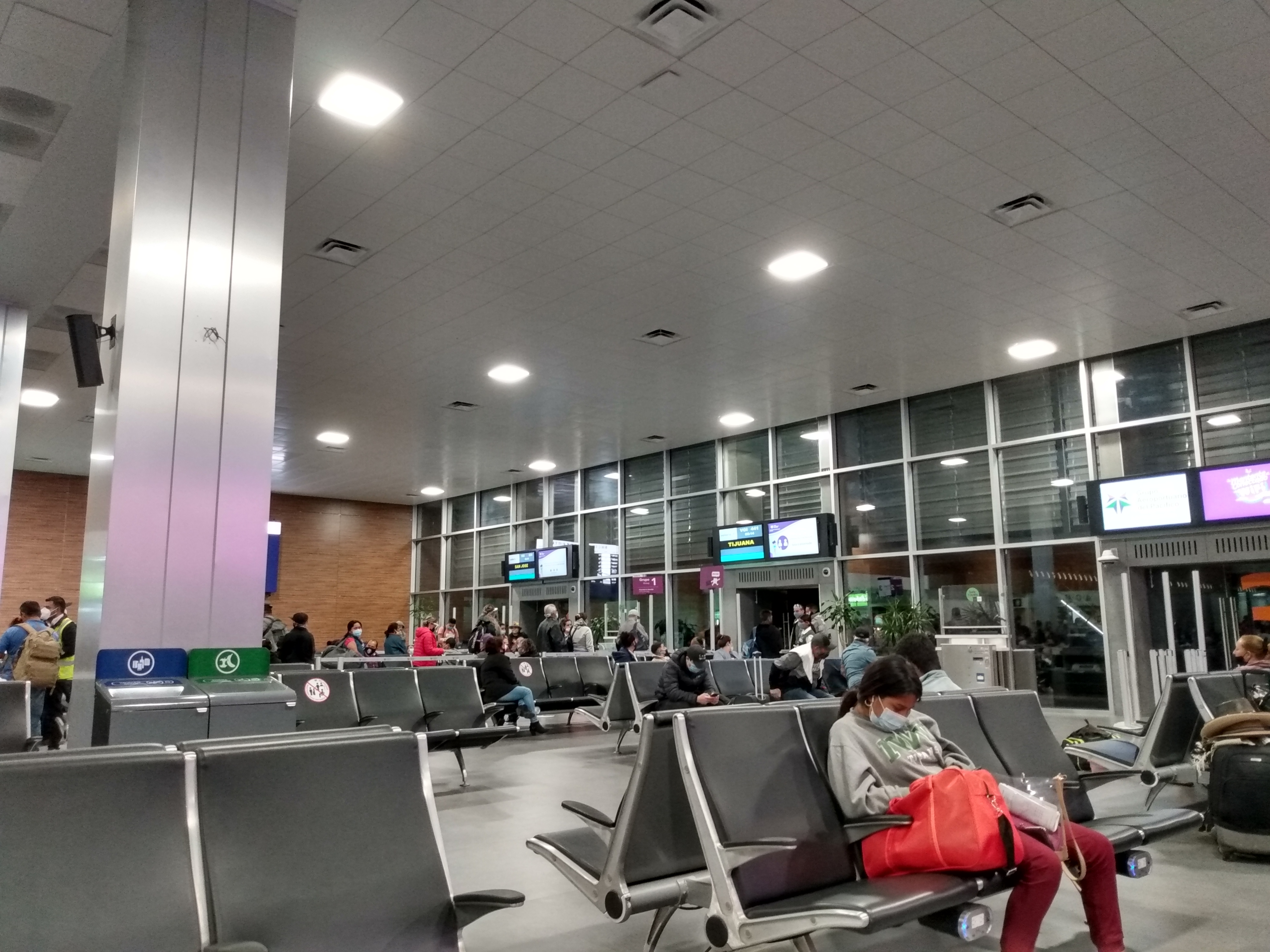
Departures concourse

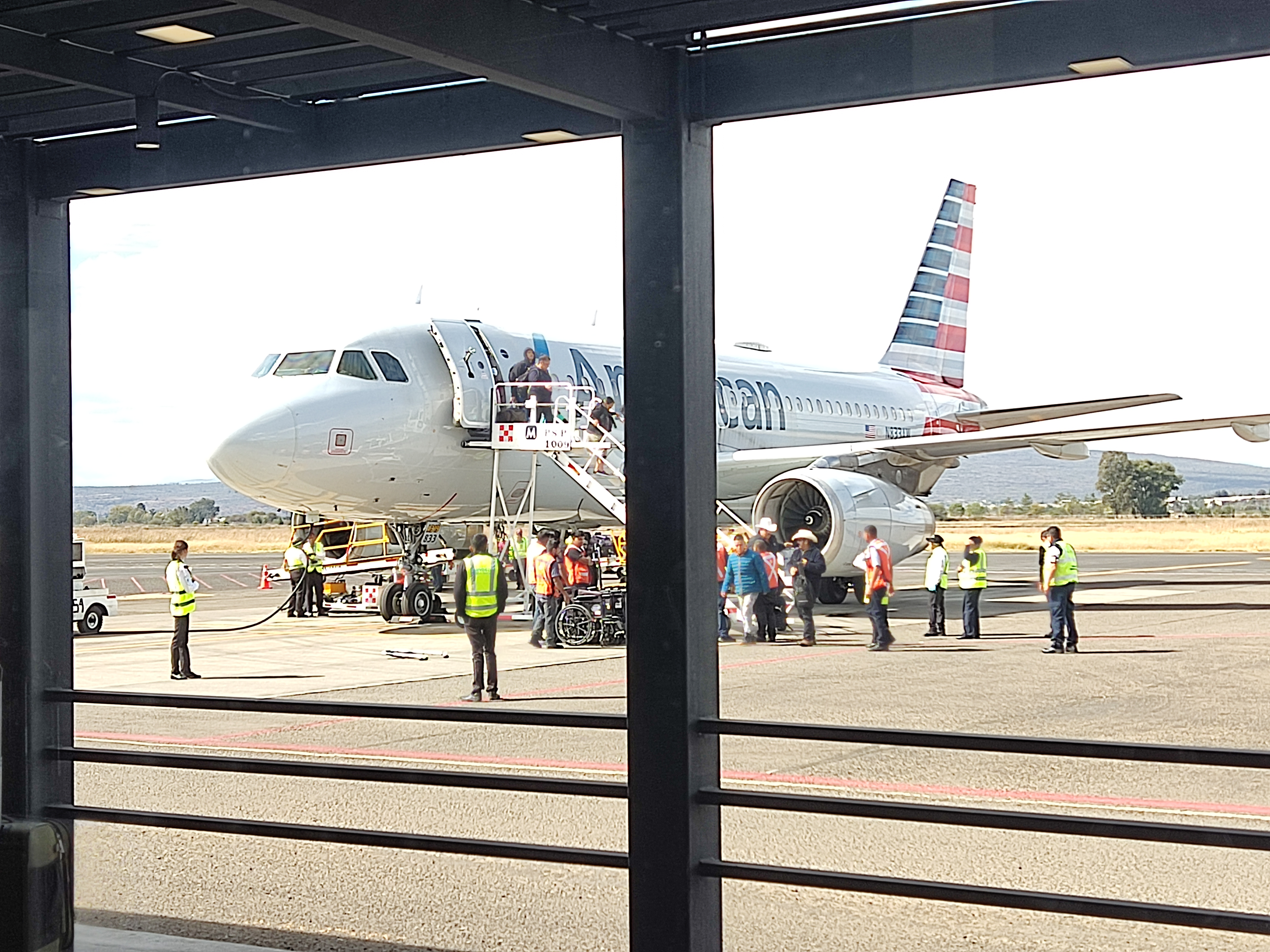
American Airlines Airbus A319-132 (N833AW) at MLM

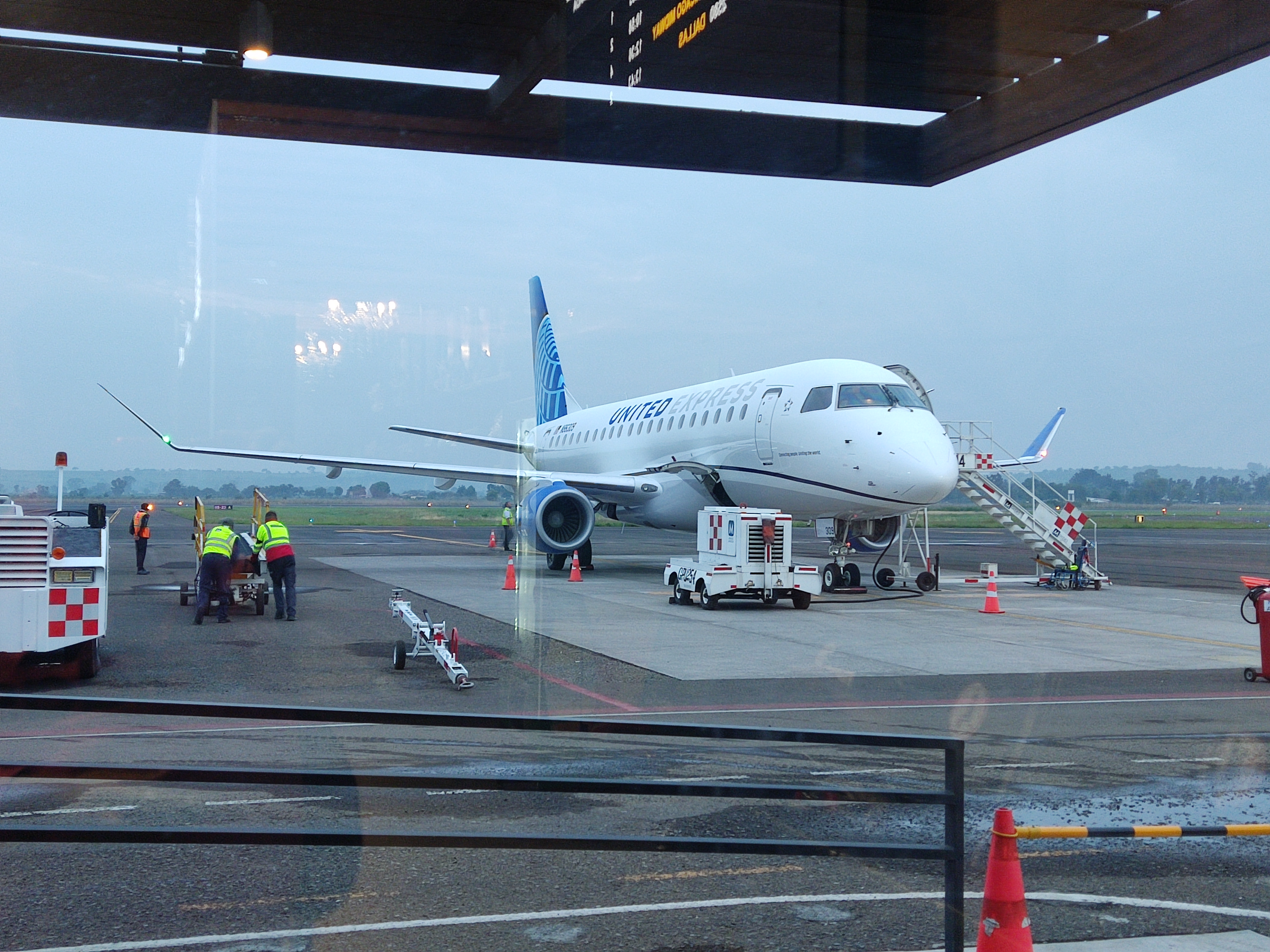
United Express ERJ-175LR (N86309) at MLM

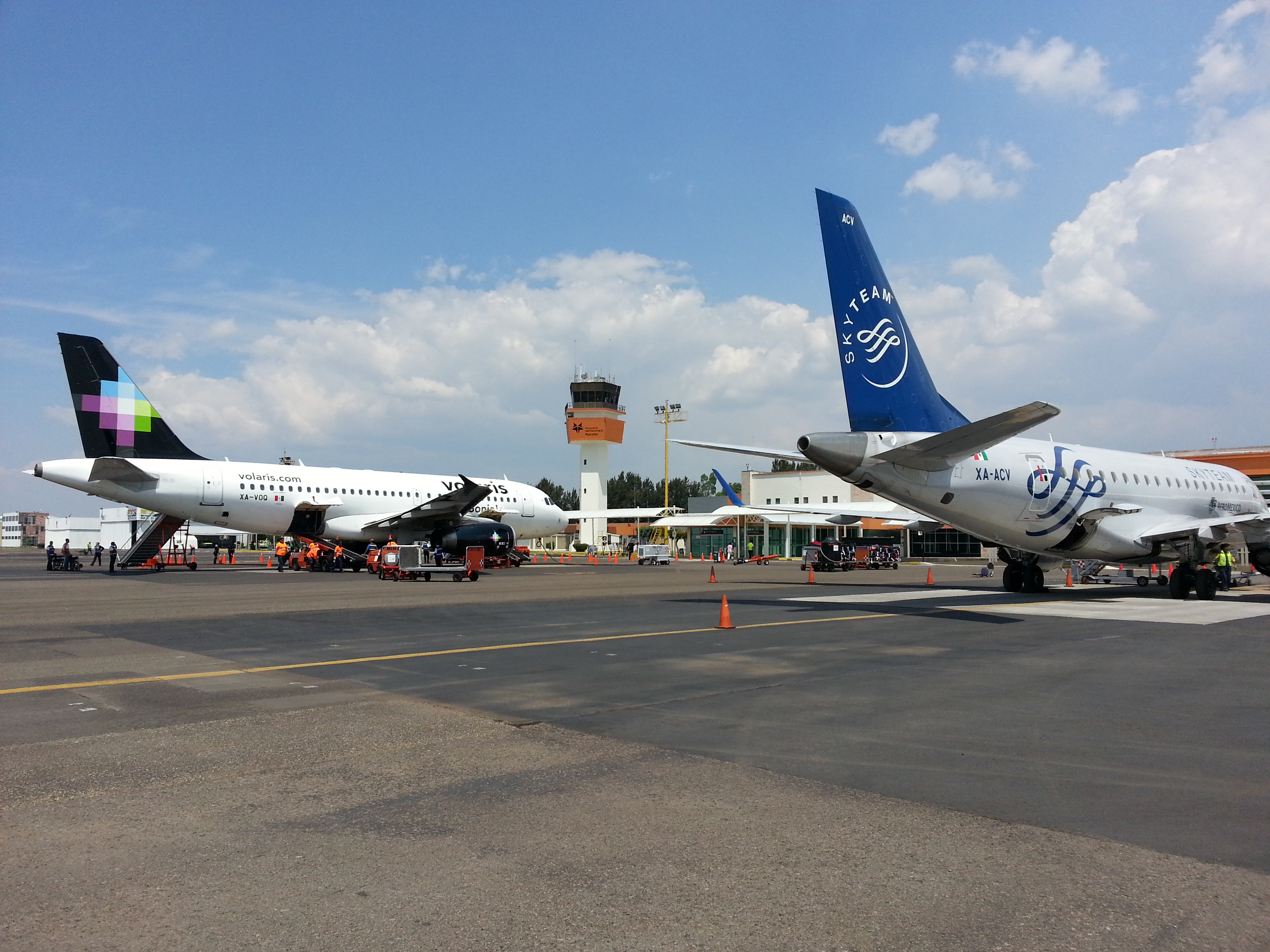
Volaris A319-133 (XA-VOQ) and Aeromexico Connect ERJ-170STD with SkyTeam livery (XA-ACV) parked at the gates.

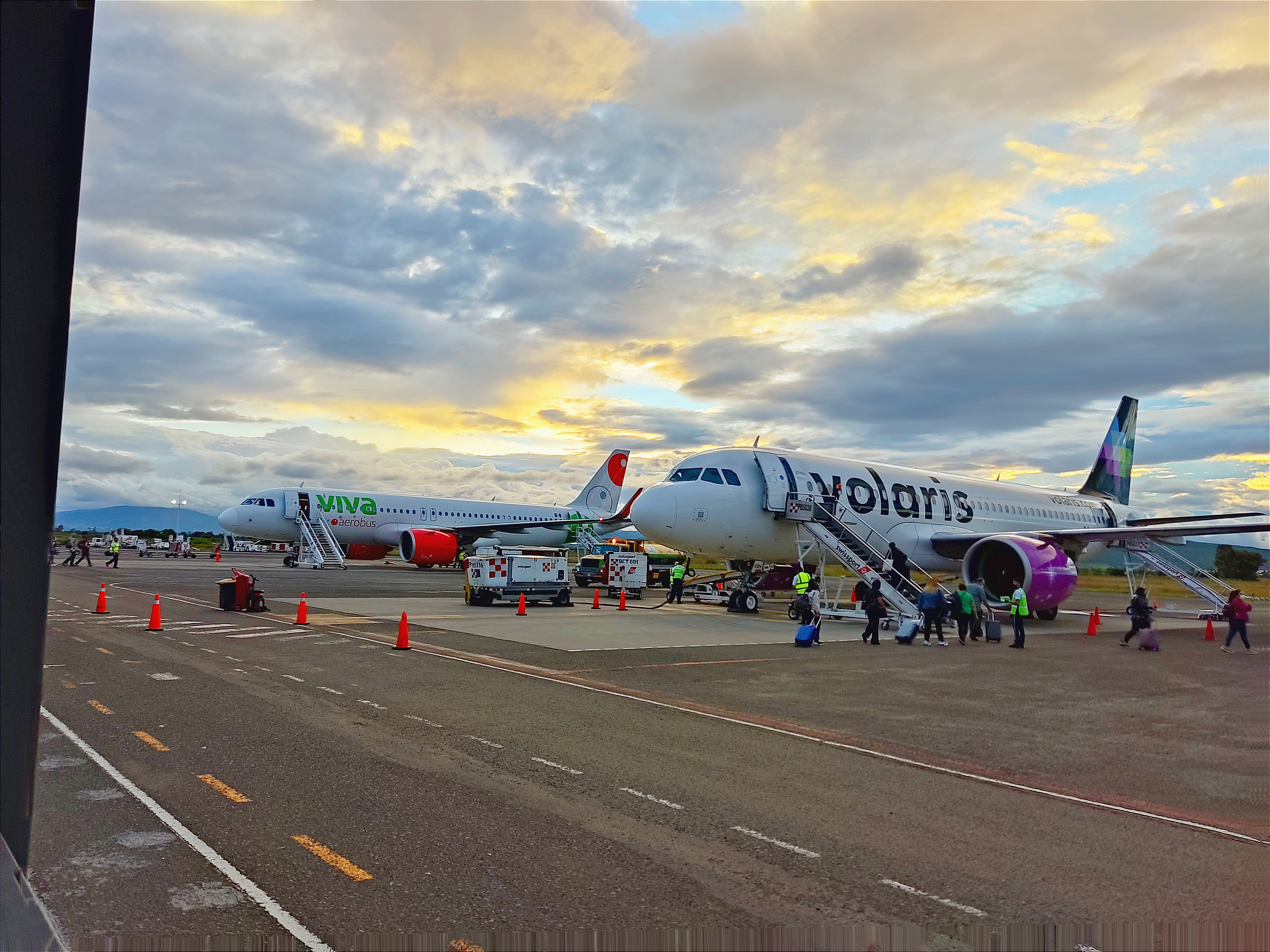
Volaris A320-271N (XA-VRH) and Viva A320-271N (XA-VIT) at MLM

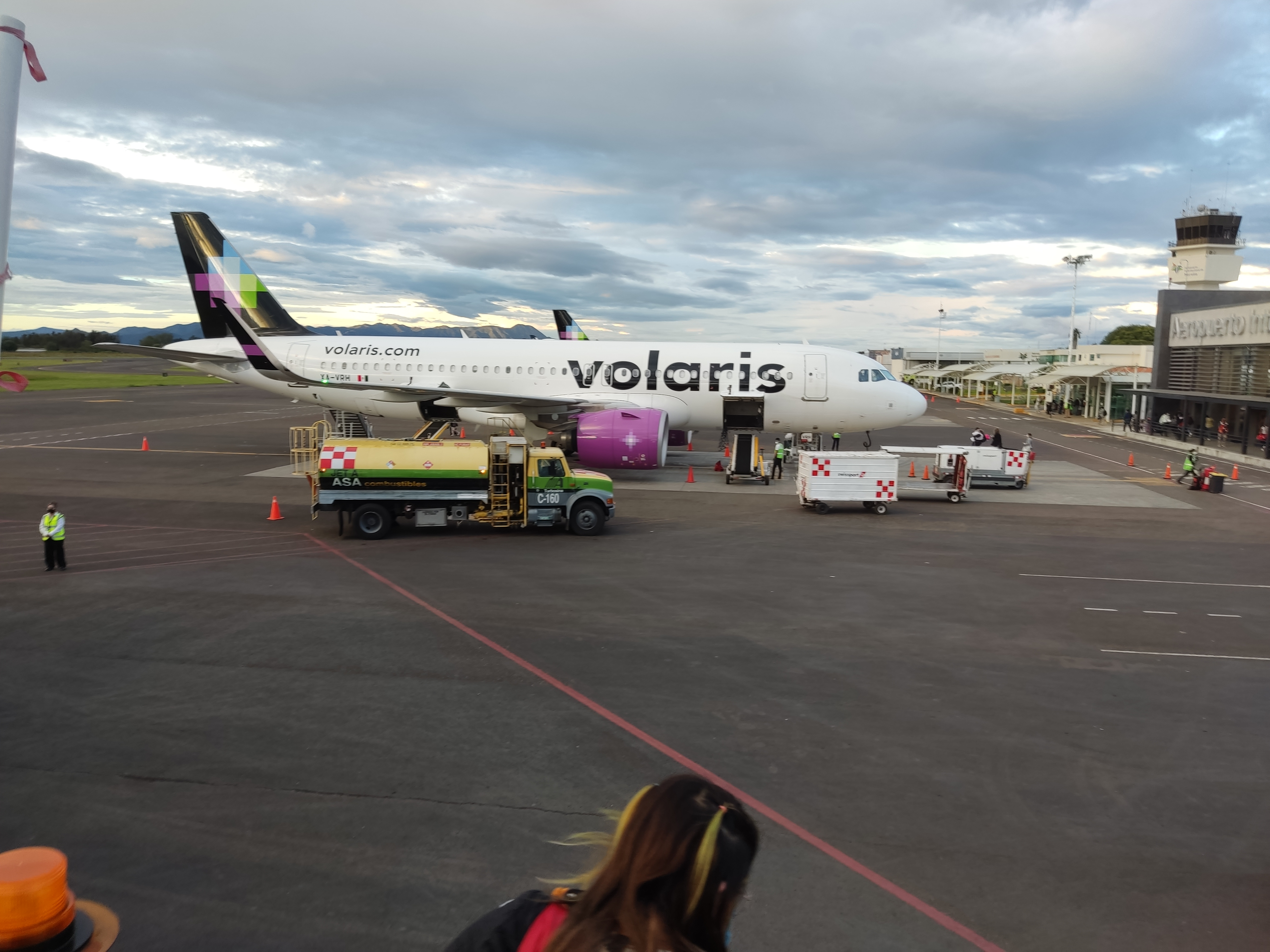
Volaris A320-271N (XA-VRH) at MLM

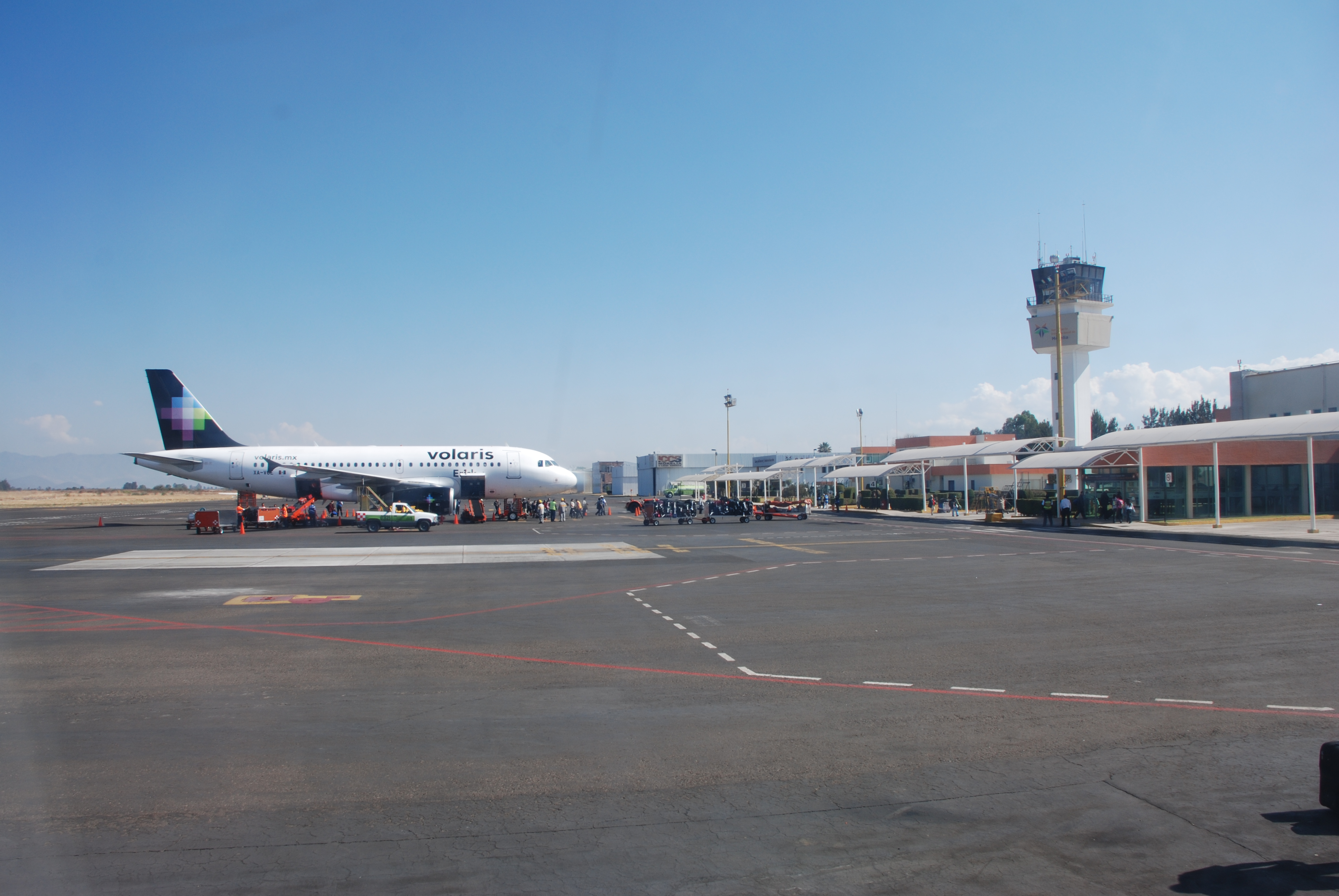
Volaris A319-133 (XA-VOE) at MLM

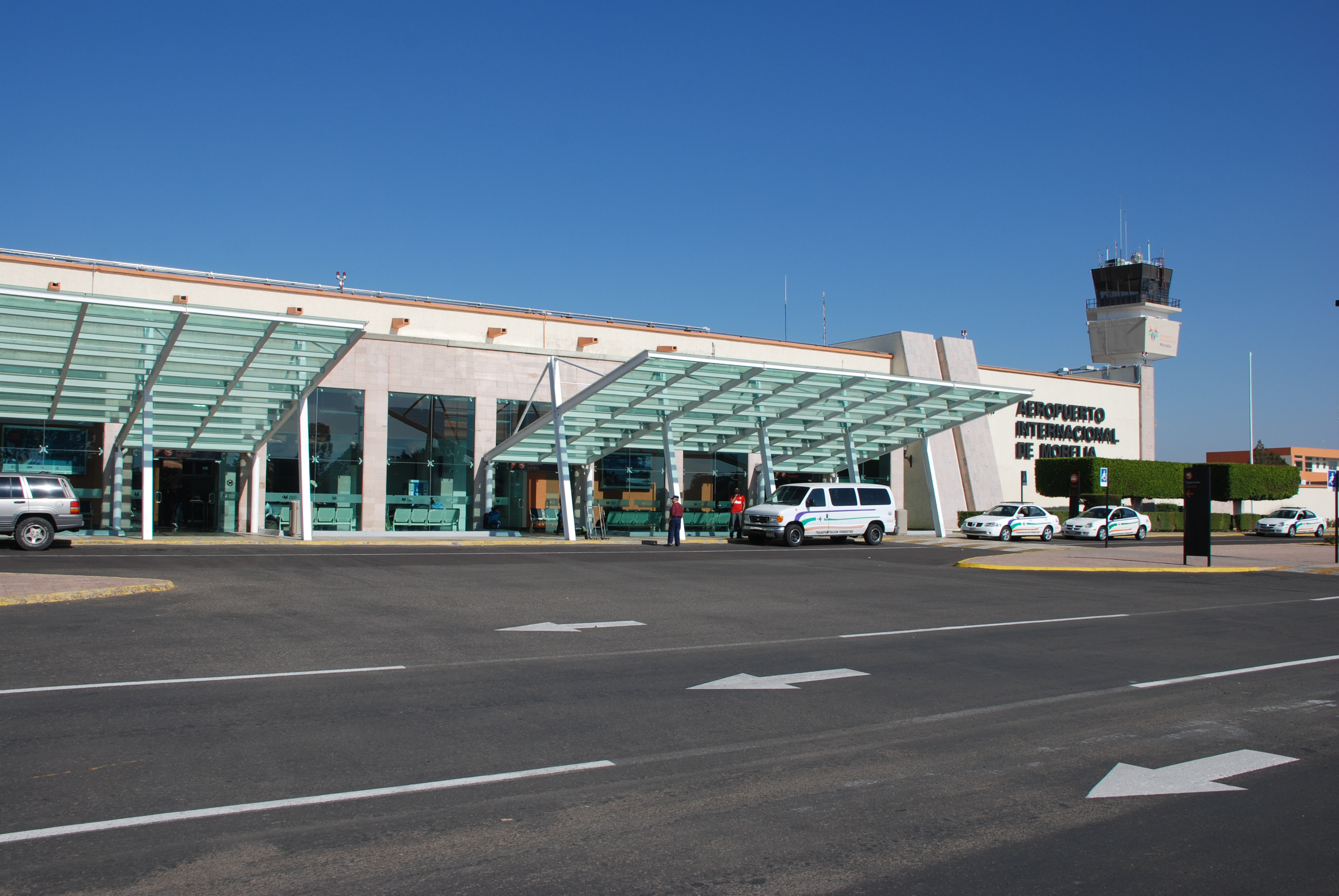
Airport before renovations.

=== Destinations map ===
Domestic destinations from Morelia International Airport
Red = Year-round destination
Blue = Future destination
Green = Seasonal destination
International destinations from Morelia International Airport
Red = Year-round destination
Blue = Future destination
Green = Seasonal destination

== Statistics ==
=== Annual Traffic ===
Passenger statistics at MLM
Year	Total Passengers	change %
2008	524,200	Steady
2009	447,600	▼14.6%
2010	429,700	▼4.0%
2011	376,200	▼12.5%
2012	409,300	▲8.8%
2013	425,200	▲3.9%
2014	475,900	▲11.9%
2015	478,500	▲0.5%
2016	535,900	▲12.0%
2017	618,800	▲15.5%
2018	729,600	▲17.9%
2019	897,800	▲23.1%
2020	631,300	▼29.7%
2021	947,100	▲50.0%
2022	1,172,700	▲23.8%
2023	1,384,300	▲18.1%
2024	1,304,600	▼5.8%
2025	1,508,100	▲15.6%

=== Busiest routes ===
Busiest routes from MLM (Jan–Dec 2025)
Rank	Airport	Passengers
1	Tijuana, Baja California	234,510
2	Chicago (O'Hare and Midway), United States (Note: The official statistics combine both O'Hare and Midway airports.)	110,766
3	Monterrey, Nuevo León	69,313
4	Dallas/Fort Worth, United States	52,421
5	Oakland, United States	6,280
6	San Jose (CA), United States	11,711
7	Oakland, United States	6,280

== Accidents and incidents ==
- 9 September 1978 - A de Havilland Canada DHC-6 Twin Otter of Lineas Aéreas del Centro flying scheduled service to the old Morelia Airport from Mexico City, crashed shortly after takeoff from Mexico City International Airport. There were 18 fatalities among the 21 passengers. The aircraft was also damaged beyond repair.
- 20 October 2002 - Aerolíneas Internacionales Flight 888, a Boeing 727-100 scheduled to fly from Morelia to León/Guanajuato, allegedly encountered 9 small, spherical UFOs prior to its 10AM takeoff roll. As reported by the crew and a witness on the ground, the sighting lasted around 10 minutes, with said objects maneuvering simultaneously. After the objects moved away, the flight was able to continue without further incident.
- 19 September 2010 - Aeroméxico Flight 6531, bound to Morelia from Las Vegas, suffered a fuel leak. The Boeing 737-700 returned to Las Vegas for an emergency landing. There were no fatalities among the 102 passengers.

== See also ==
- List of the busiest airports in Mexico
- List of airports in Mexico
- List of airports by ICAO code: M
- List of busiest airports in North America
- List of the busiest airports in Latin America
- Transportation in Mexico
- Tourism in Mexico
- Grupo Aeroportuario del Pacífico
- Morelia International Film Festival
- Monarch Butterfly Biosphere Reserve
- Morelia Cathedral
