= Álvaro Obregón, Michoacán =

Town in Mexico

Coordinates: 19.8238°N 101.0400°W

Álvaro Obregón is located in the center zone of the Mexican state of Michoacán. This town limits with the state of Guanajuato to the north, with Querendaro and Indaparapeo to the east, with Charo to the south, with Tarimbaro to the west and with Cuitzeo to the northwest. It is also home to Morelia's International Airport (Aeropuerto Internacional General Francisco J. Mujica).

== Demographics ==
It has a total of 19,502 people. Its ethnic population is about 49 people, 31 men and 18 women and their principal languages are Huichol and Purepecha. Its education structure is formed by preschool, high school and secondary education.

== History ==
This town was founded between 1760 and 1770 by people who lived in other towns like Singuio. This town is named Álvaro Obregón in honor of assassinated Revolutionary General and subsequent President Álvaro Obregón.

== Geography ==
Its territorial size is 162.64 km^{2} and it represents 0.35% of Michoacán.

Its weather is temperate with rains in summer. It has important mountains and valleys like Cuitzeo, lomas de Purisimio, Quirio, Tzentzenguaro, and its principal river is rio Grande.

=== Climate ===
Climate data for Álvaro Obregón
| Month | Jan | Feb | Mar | Apr | May | Jun | Jul | Aug | Sep | Oct | Nov | Dec | Year |
|---|---|---|---|---|---|---|---|---|---|---|---|---|---|
| Mean daily maximum °C (°F) | 22.5 (72.5) | 23.5 (74.3) | 26.0 (78.8) | 26.6 (79.9) | 26.8 (80.2) | 25.4 (77.7) | 24.1 (75.4) | 23.8 (74.8) | 23.7 (74.7) | 23.5 (74.3) | 23.2 (73.8) | 22.7 (72.9) | 24.3 (75.7) |
| Mean daily minimum °C (°F) | 3.1 (37.6) | 4 (39) | 6.2 (43.2) | 8.1 (46.6) | 9.7 (49.5) | 11.0 (51.8) | 10.7 (51.3) | 10.7 (51.3) | 10.6 (51.1) | 8.7 (47.7) | 5.4 (41.7) | 3.7 (38.7) | 7.7 (45.9) |
| Average precipitation mm (inches) | 7.6 (0.3) | 5.1 (0.2) | 7.6 (0.3) | 18 (0.7) | 66 (2.6) | 150 (5.9) | 200 (7.8) | 180 (6.9) | 160 (6.3) | 71 (2.8) | 5.1 (0.2) | 5.1 (0.2) | 870 (34.3) |
Source: Weatherbase

== Transportation ==
General Francisco J. Mujica International Airport is located in Álvaro Obregón.

== Economy ==
The main economic activity performed in the town is agriculture.

They mainly seed corn, wheat, alfalfa, sargo and chickpea.

== Notable sites/buildings ==
- Templo de San Bartolo, Templo Espiritual de las Tres Ponencias y Palacio Municipal.
- Ex hacienda de San Bartolo.
- Ex hacienda de Quirio.
- Ex hacienda de Tzintzimeo.
- Ex hacienda de Palo Blanco.
