= Raúl Ríos Gamboa =

Mexican politician

- Born: 23 May 1973 (age 53); Michoacán, Mexico
- Occupation: Politician
- Political party: PRD

Raúl Ríos Gamboa (born 23 May 1973) is a Mexican politician affiliated with the Party of the Democratic Revolution (PRD). In the 2006 general election he was elected to the Chamber of Deputies to represent Michoacán's sixth district during the 60th session of Congress.
