= Emiliano Velázquez Esquivel =

Mexican politician

- Born: 1 August 1964 (age 61); Michoacán, Mexico
- Occupation: Politician
- Political party: PRD

Emiliano Velázquez Esquivel (born 1 August 1964) is a Mexican politician from the Party of the Democratic Revolution (PRD). In the 2009 mid-terms he was elected to the Chamber of Deputies to represent Michoacán's sixth district during the 61st session of Congress.
