= Queréndaro =

Municipality of Michoacán, Mexico

Coordinates: 19.7303°N 100.8439°W

- Municipality
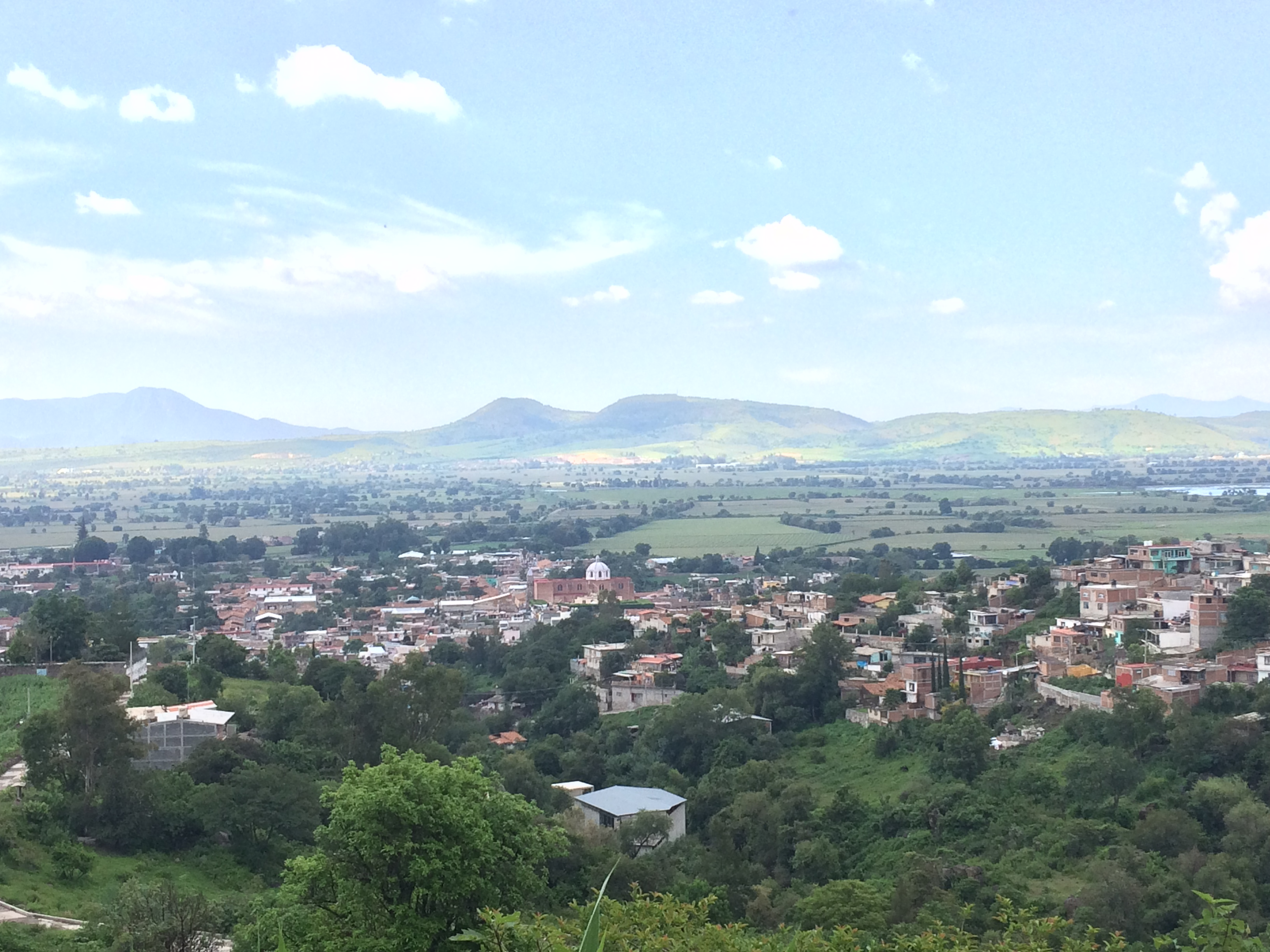

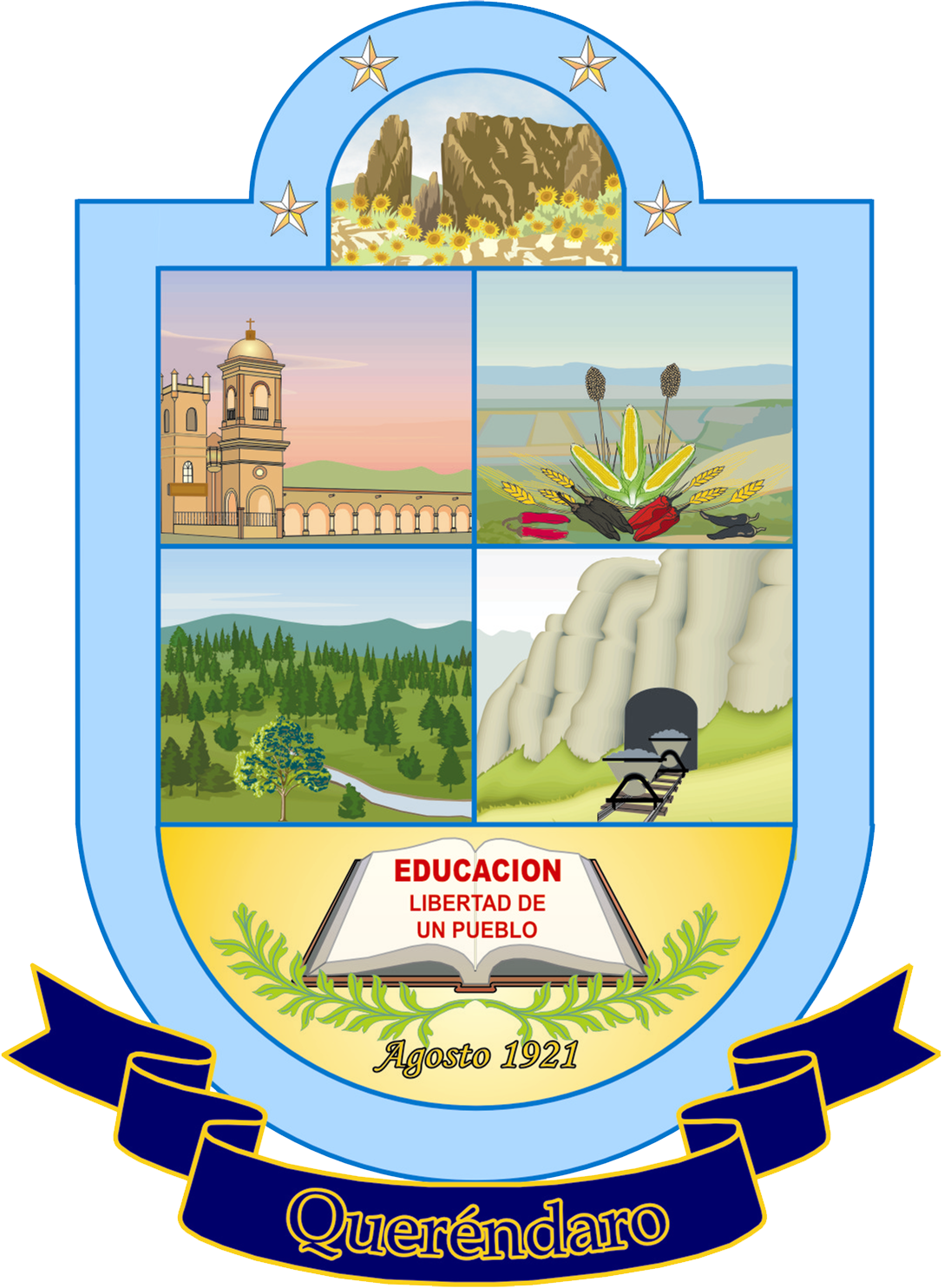
- Coat of arms

- Location in Mexico Queréndaro (Mexico)
- Country: Mexico
- State: Michoacán
- Demonym: (in Spanish)
- Time zone: UTC−6 (CST)

Queréndaro is a municipality in the Mexican state of Michoacán. The word Queréndaro is of Chichimeca origin and means "place of rocks", from the great rock in the municipality known as "La Peña Rajada". It contains a cave with paintings that date from the pre-Hispanic era.

It is a township and municipality dedicated to agriculture, fishing, cattle breeding and bread making. The municipality produces corn, wheat, sorghum, various species of chili pepper, beans, barley, alfalfa, and chickpeas, among others. It is recognized regionally for its Feria del Chile (Feast of the Chili Pepper), which is the main celebration of the municipality, celebrating the founding of the town.

Queréndaro is composed of other small towns or communities, including Pueblo Viejo and Rio de Parras, the two larger communities also referred to as tenencias. The other communities include El Castillo, Milpillas, San Miguel Las Cuevas, El Rincon de Zetina, San Jose De La Cumbre, La Estancia, San Antonio Tiradores, each having a population from 250 to 1,000 individuals. Other smaller towns like Ojo de Agua Grande, Colonia Eusebio Luna (El Zocalo), El Panteon de las Agujas, El Nopal, Ojo de Agua Chico (Ojo de Agua Chiquito), Jauja, and Dolores have between 10 and 249 inhabitants. Numerous other small towns have fewer than 100 persons. The primary occupations are agriculture, fishing, cattle, pig, horse, and sheep raising.

== History ==
Queréndaro was founded in the time of the Purépecha Empire. During the colonial era, it was occupied by Jesuits, who used it to support and maintain their order in the area. The land turned out to be suitable for farming, and, in addition, it was used as a rest area on the road between Morelia and Mexico City. A nearby landholding named Otzumatlán legally became part of Zinapécuaro in 1831, became a municipality in 1921, and nowadays goes by the name Queréndaro.

== Geography ==
Queréndaro is located in northern Michoacán at the coordinates 19º48 'north latitude and 100º53' west longitude, at a height of 1,840 meters above sea level. It borders the municipalities of Zinapécuaro to the east, Ciudad Hidalgo to the south, and Indaparapeo and Alvaro Obregón to the west. Its distance to the state capital Morelia is 35 km.

=== Land area ===
Queréndaro's surface area is 234.43 km^{2} and represents 0.39 percent of the state's total.

=== Weather ===
The climate of Queréndaro is temperate, with a rainy summer. It has an annual rainfall of 1165 millimeters, and temperatures range from 4.9 to 37.0°C.

=== Flora and fauna ===
Queréndaro's flora is formed by mixed forest with pine and aile trees, forest of conifers with oyamel tree and pine, and prairies with nopal, cactus, tall grasses, huizache and diverse scrub. Its fauna consists of armadillos, coyote, hare, raccoon, opossum, skunk, hen of mount, mourning dove, duck, white fish, frogs and other species of birds and small fishes native to the lake, mountains rivers, creeks and ponds.

== Tourism and sport ==
Queréndaro has a spa (El Pedregal) named for the abundance of stones where it is located. There are also 2 soccer fields, 5 basketball courts, and a sports complex with an athletics track.

== Culture ==
=== Festivities and celebrations ===
- March April – Holy Week, with staging of the Passion of Christ
- April 10 – Celebration in honor of Jesus, Lord of Love.
- May 15 – Celebration in honor of St. Isidore the Farmer.
- August – Feast of the Chili Pepper (Second Week).
- August 15 – Celebration in honor of the Virgin of the Assumption, who is the patron of the town, with music and fireworks.
- September 15 and 16 – Celebration of the national holidays.
- November 2 – Day of the Dead
- December 12 – Celebration of the Virgin of Guadalupe, with dances, music, popular dances and fireworks.

== See also ==
- Municipalities of Mexico

== Sources ==
- Romero Flores, Jesús (1974). Nomenclatura Geográfica de Michoacán. Morelia, Mich., Investigaciones Lingüísticas. p. 52.
- Romero Flores, Jesús (1975). Michoacanos Distinguidos. Morelia, Mich., Cuadernos de Cultura Popular. p. 43.
- Carreño, Gloria (1989). El Pueblo que se Negó a Morir. México, D.F., Editorial, S.A. p. 121.
- Tavera Alfaro, Javier; Martínez de Lejarza J.J. (1974). Análisis Estadístico de la Provincia de Michoacán.
- Secretaría de Gobernación, Gobierno del Estado de Michoacán, Centro Nacional de Desarrollo Municipal, Centro Estatal de Estudios Municipales. Los Municipios de Michoacán. p. 532.
- Instituto Nacional de Estadística Geografía e Informática (1990). Anuario Estadístico del Estado de Michoacán. Aguascalientes, Méx. p. 162.
- Instituto Nacional de Estadística Geografía e Informática (1994). Anuario Estadístico del Estado de Michoacán. Aguascalientes, Méx. p. 393.
- Instituto Nacional de Estadística Geografía e Informática (1996). Anuario Estadístico del Estado de Michoacán. Aguascalientes, Méx. p. 434.
- Instituto Nacional de Estadística Geografía e Informática (1995). Resultados Definitivos Tabulados Básicos. Aguascalientes, Méx.
- Instituto Nacional de Estadística Geografía e Informática (1983). X Censo de Población y Vivienda 1980 (Cartografía Geoestadística del Estado de Michoacán). Vol. I. México. p. 171.
- Instituto Nacional de Estadística Geografía e Informática (1985). Síntesis Geográfica del Estado de Michoacán. Iztacalco, México, D.F. p. 315.
- Instituto Nacional de Estadística Geografía e Informática (1995). Resultados Definitivos Cálculos Básicos.
- Dirección General de Inspección Fiscal. Estudio Histórico, Económico y Fiscal. Vol. Tomo I. Michoacán. p. 623.
- UNAM (1979). Atlas Geográfico del Estado de Michoacán. p. 85.
- Secretaría de Gobernación, Centro Nacional de Desarrollo Municipal (1993). Gobierno y Administración Municipal en México. p. 569.
- Gobierno del Estado de Michoacán (1993). El Rumbo es Michoacán. p. 155.
- Información proporcionada por cada uno de los H. Ayuntamientos del Estado de Michoacán, 1996-1998.
