= Mario Cruz Andrade =

Mexican politician

- Born: 20 April 1957 (age 69); Michoacán, Mexico
- Occupation: Politician
- Political party: PRD

Mario Cruz Andrade (born 20 April 1957) is a Mexican politician from the Party of the Democratic Revolution (PRD). In the 2000 general election he was elected to the Chamber of Deputies to represent Michoacán's sixth district during the 58th session of Congress.
