= Luis Olvera Correa =

Mexican politician

- Born: 28 January 1970 (age 56); Michoacán, Mexico
- Occupation: Deputy
- Political party: PRI

Luis Olvera Correa (born 28 January 1970) is a Mexican politician affiliated with the Institutional Revolutionary Party (PRI). In the 2012 general election he was elected to the Chamber of Deputies to represent Michoacán's sixth district during the 62nd session of Congress.
