= Luis Fernando Correa Bahamon =

Colombian businessman (born 1955)

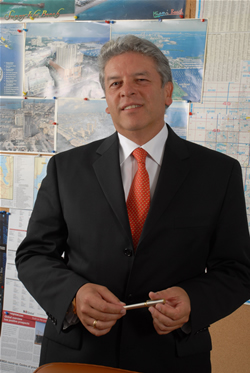
- Born: 23 April 1955 (age 71); Medellín, Antioquia, Colombia
- Education: Universidad Javeriana, Xavier University
- Children: Daniel, Juan Camilo, Andres Fernando, Felipe (suicide Abril 2016)

Luis Fernando Correa Bahamon (born 23 April 1955) is a Colombian business man, philanthropist, and investor. He is an important leader in the hotel and construction industry in Colombia.

== Biography ==
Correa was born in Medellín, Colombia. Before entering business he worked as a university professor and administrator as well as a public servant. He is a member of the US National Association of Realtors. Correa has earned a BSc in Economics at Universidad Javeriana in Bogotá, and pursued graduate studies and an MBA at Xavier University in Cincinnati, Ohio.

Correa is active in real-estate through his firms, Luis F. Correa y Asociados (Luis F. Correa and Associates), Real Estate Total, and NAI Colombia, parts of Red Empresarial Luis F. Correa. He is the owner of Wyndham Hotels & Resorts in Colombia through his company Diplomat Hotels, has been involved in the development of the Sheraton brand in Colombia and Ecuador, and recently has managed the market entry of the Spanish hotel chain NH Hoteles. In 2010 he began a plan aiming to reinvent Colombia's hotel industry by building 100 hotels in 10 years. His contributions to the development of Colombia's economy have been noted by international leaders including President of Colombia Alvaro Uribe Velez and Republic of China President Ma Ying-jeou.

He simultaneously served as the federation's Regional President for the Americas, as well as a delegate to the United Nations Economic and Social Council representing the Federation as a special consultant.

Luis Fernando Correa has written 5 books related to real estate. He also has invested in several other business fields and through the Red Empresarial Luis F. Correa conglomerate is the owner of Lectorum Publications, Scholastic Corporation's Spanish-language book publisher, and Constructora Correas. He also is active in "Un Techo Para Colombia", a foundation dedicated to the construction of homes for the poor in Colombia, as well as The Global Housing Foundation, and The Scholarship Foundation.

== Awards ==
Correa was honored as "Man of the Year" by construction and development magazine En Obra, and was named "The King of Hotels" by Revista Dinero.

Correa Bahamon was also the first Latin American to occupy the World Presidency of FIABCI, the Paris-based International Real Estate Federation, following his 2007 election against Julia Clement.
