= Las Tinajas massacre =

2022 mass shooting in Mexico

- Part of the Mexican drug war
- Las Tinajas massacre (Michoacán) Las Tinajas massacre (Mexico)
- Location: 19°52′05″N 100°49′03″W; Las Tinajas, Zinapécuaro, Michoacán, Mexico
- Date: 27 March 2022; 22:30 (Central Time (UTC−06:00))
- Attack type: Mass shooting
- Weapons: machine guns and assault rifles
- Deaths: 20
- Injuries: 5
- Perpetrator: At least 10 gunmen of the Familia Michoacana
- Motive: Gang war

On 27 March 2022, 20 people were killed in a mass shooting in Las Tinajas, a neighbourhood in the town of Zinapécuaro, Michoacán, Mexico.

== Background ==
The Mexican drug war is a low-intensity conflict which began in 2006. Michoacán, in western Mexico, is badly affected by the conflict. Several massacres have occurred there, including a mass shooting on 27 February 2022 in San José de Gracia. Rival gangs in the area are also involved in smuggling of gasoline and in illegal tapping of pipelines.

== Incident ==
During the evening of 27 March 2022, gunmen armed with machine guns and assault rifles opened fire at an illegal cockfighting pit and shot dead 17 men and three women. Several other people were wounded. One person later died on their way to the hospital. The massacre was believed to be part of a conflict between the Jalisco New Generation Cartel and a local gang called the Familia Michoacana.

== Aftermath ==
On 1 April 2022, five men were arrested in Susupuato in connection with the massacre. They were also linked to a February 2022 attack on a prosecutor's office in Maravatío.
