= Irimbo =

- Municipality
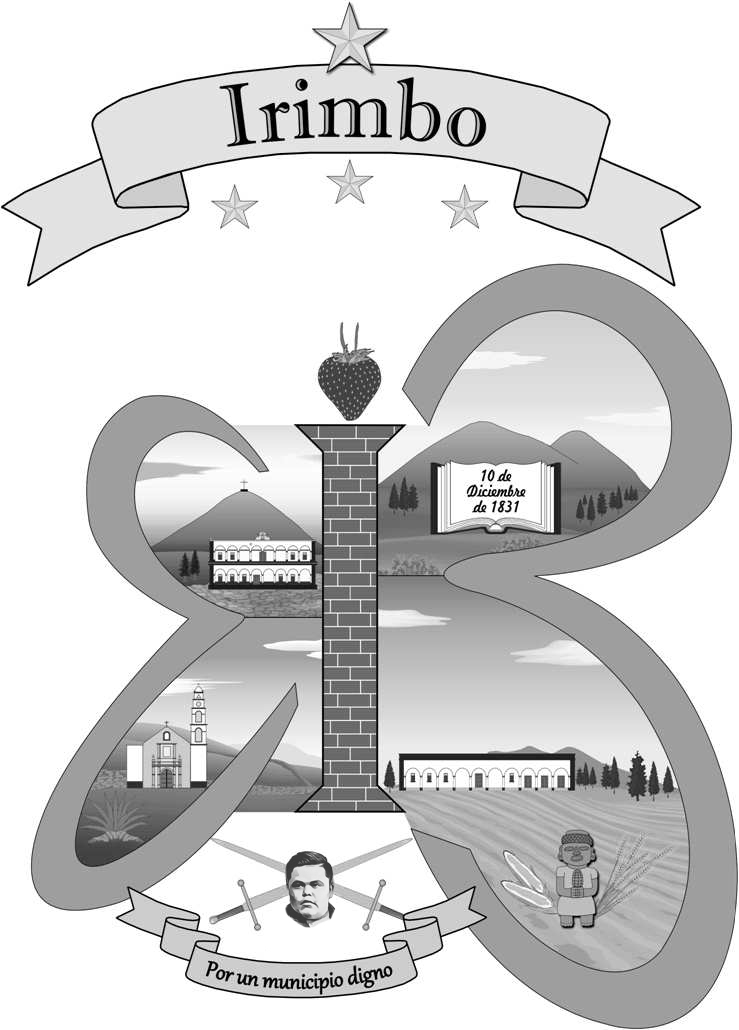
- Coat of arms

- Location within Michoacán Location within Mexico
- Coordinates: 19°42′00″N 100°28′42″W
- Country: Mexico
- State: Michoacán

Government
  - Mayor: José Ignacio López Zaenz
  - Federal electoral district: Michoacán's 6th

Area
  - Total: 125.54 km^{2} (48.47 sq mi)
- Elevation: 2,150 m (7,050 ft)

Population (2010)
  - Total: 14,766
  - Density: 117.62/km^{2} (304.63/sq mi)
- Time zone: UTC-6 (Zona Centro)
- Postal code: 61286 -
- Website: irimbo.gob.mx

Irimbo is a municipality located in the northeastern part of the Mexican state of Michoacán. The municipality has an area of 125.54 square kilometers.

The seat of the municipality is also named Irimbo.

As of 2010, it has a population of 14,766.

== List of towns ==
- Irimbo
- San Lorenzo Queréndaro
- San José de Magallanes
- San Francisco Epunguio
- La Frontera
- Colonia el Colorín
- Los Marzos
- Loma de Chupio
- La Cuajada
- San Miguel la Virgen
- Ampliación las Joyas
- Cristo Rey
- Los Mogotes
- Hacienda Jaripeo
- Colonia los Cedros
- Cerrito Blanco
- Balvaneda
- Llano Grande
- Los Hoyos
- San Miguel el Alto
- Los Marzos Pequeña
- Fraccionamiento el Obraje
- Concharrás
- Tzintzingareo
- Manzana de San Vicente
