= Indaparapeo =

- Municipality
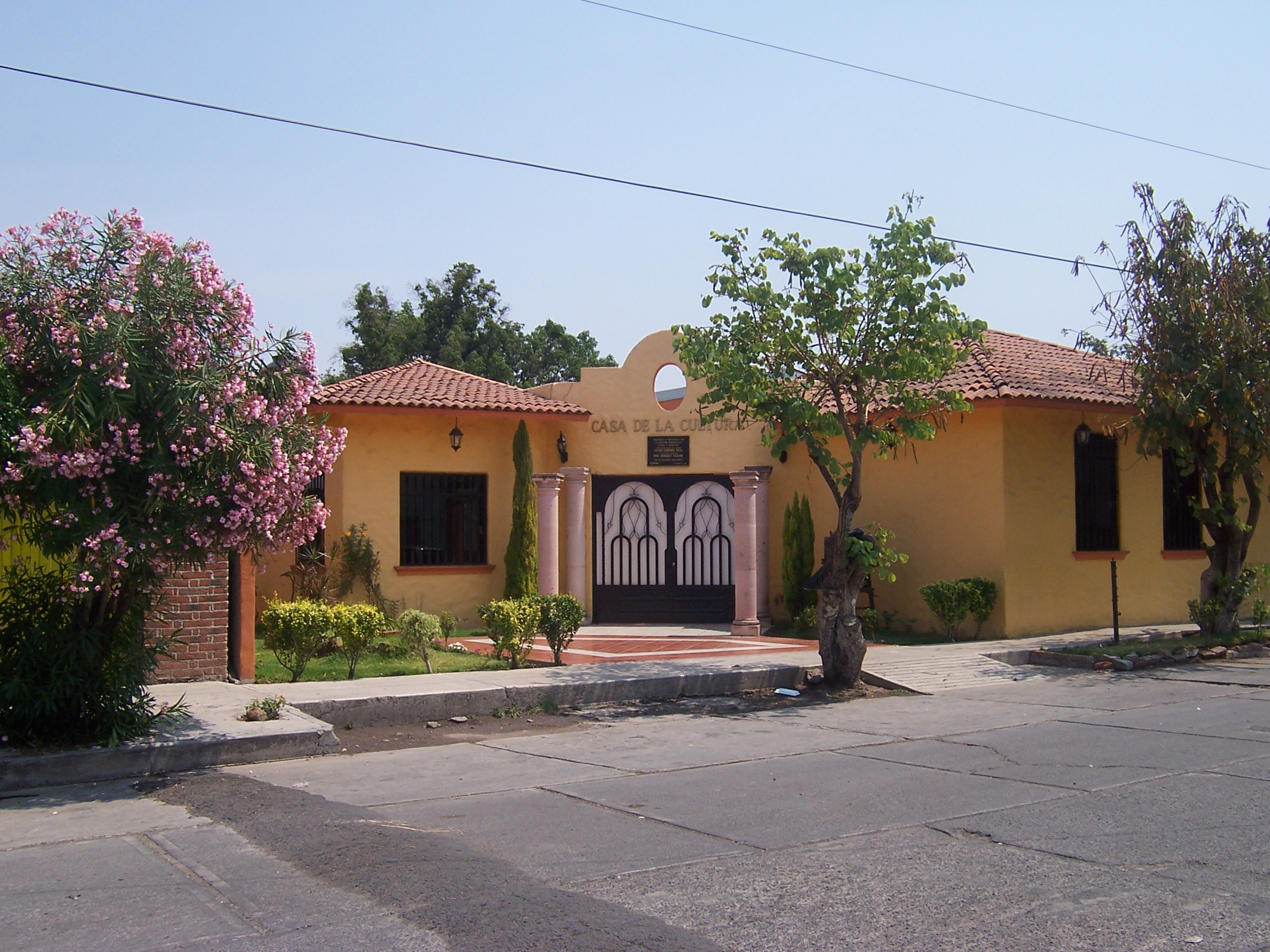
- Cultural centre in Indaparapeo

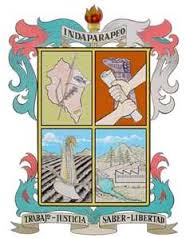
- Coat of arms

- Location in Michoacán

- Location in Mexico
- Coordinates: 19°47′16″N 100°58′07″W
- Country: Mexico
- State: Michoacán
- Established: 10 December 1831
- Seat: Indaparapeo

Government
  - President: María Teresa Pérez Romero

Area
  - Total: 176.985 km^{2} (68.334 sq mi)
- Elevation (of seat): 1,921 m (6,302 ft)

Population (2010 Census)
  - Total: 16,427
  - Estimate (2015 Intercensal Survey): 16,990
  - Density: 92.816/km^{2} (240.39/sq mi)
  - Seat: 6,791
- Time zone: UTC-6 (Central)
- Postal codes: 58970–58978
- Area code: 451
- Website: Official website

Indaparapeo is a municipality in the Mexican state of Michoacán. It is located approximately 25 kilometres (16 mi) east of the state capital of Morelia.

== Geography ==
The municipality of Indaparapeo is located in the Trans-Mexican Volcanic Belt in northeast Michoacán at an elevation between 1,900 and 2,900 metres (6,200–9,500 ft). It borders the municipalities of Zinapécuaro to the north, Queréndaro to the east, Tzitzio to the south, Charo to the southwest, and Álvaro Obregón to the northwest. The municipality covers an area of 176.985 square kilometres (68.334 sq mi) and comprises 0.30% of the state's area.

As of 2009, the land in Indaparapeo consists of farmland (41%), temperate forest (41%), grassland (9%), rainforest (5%), and urban areas (3%). About 95% of the entire municipality is located in the Lerma River basin, while the southernmost part is drained by the Purungueo River, a tributary of the Cutzamala River.

Indaparapeo has a temperate climate with rain in the summer. Average temperatures in the municipality range between 18 and 20 °C (64–68 °F), and average annual precipitation ranges between 700 and 1,200 millimetres (28–47 in).

Climate data for Quirio weather station at 19°47′51″N 100°59′42″W, 1858 m above sea level (1981–2010 averages, 1951–2010 extremes)
Month	Jan	Feb	Mar	Apr	May	Jun	Jul	Aug	Sep	Oct	Nov	Dec	Year
Record high °C (°F)	33.5 (92.3)	33.0 (91.4)	34.5 (94.1)	37.5 (99.5)	38.0 (100.4)	38.0 (100.4)	36.0 (96.8)	34.0 (93.2)	34.0 (93.2)	33.5 (92.3)	34.0 (93.2)	32.0 (89.6)	38.0 (100.4)
Mean daily maximum °C (°F)	23.2 (73.8)	25.0 (77.0)	27.1 (80.8)	29.2 (84.6)	30.0 (86.0)	27.7 (81.9)	25.5 (77.9)	25.4 (77.7)	25.3 (77.5)	25.5 (77.9)	25.1 (77.2)	23.9 (75.0)	26.1 (79.0)
Daily mean °C (°F)	14.2 (57.6)	15.4 (59.7)	17.3 (63.1)	19.7 (67.5)	21.3 (70.3)	21.0 (69.8)	19.5 (67.1)	19.3 (66.7)	19.1 (66.4)	18.0 (64.4)	16.1 (61.0)	14.8 (58.6)	18.0 (64.4)
Mean daily minimum °C (°F)	5.2 (41.4)	5.9 (42.6)	7.5 (45.5)	10.2 (50.4)	12.5 (54.5)	14.2 (57.6)	13.5 (56.3)	13.2 (55.8)	12.9 (55.2)	10.4 (50.7)	7.2 (45.0)	5.7 (42.3)	9.9 (49.8)
Record low °C (°F)	−3.0 (26.6)	−3.0 (26.6)	−2.0 (28.4)	2.0 (35.6)	4.0 (39.2)	6.0 (42.8)	8.5 (47.3)	7.5 (45.5)	3.0 (37.4)	1.0 (33.8)	−2.0 (28.4)	−5.5 (22.1)	−5.5 (22.1)
Average precipitation mm (inches)	16.2 (0.64)	12.6 (0.50)	8.0 (0.31)	12.1 (0.48)	32.3 (1.27)	113.3 (4.46)	158.8 (6.25)	143.2 (5.64)	119.0 (4.69)	44.7 (1.76)	8.0 (0.31)	5.6 (0.22)	673.8 (26.53)
Average rainy days (≥ 1 mm)	3.0	1.7	1.7	3.4	6.6	16.0	21.9	20.4	16.8	7.7	2.7	1.7	103.6
Source: Servicio Meteorológico Nacional

== History ==
In the Purépecha language, Indaparapeo has been translated to mean "place of games" or "place of victory in combat"; the latter would appear to be a reference to the Purépecha defeating the Aztecs. Prior to Spanish contact, Indaparapeo was inhabited by the Matlatzinca people, who were allies of the Purépecha.

Indaparapeo was one of the 61 municipalities initially created in Michoacán in 1831. Its original extent has been reduced by the creation of several municipalities from its territory, namely Queréndaro in 1921, Álvaro Obregón in 1930 and Tzitzio in 1936.

== Administration ==
The municipal government comprises a president, a councillor (Spanish: síndico), and seven trustees (regidores), four elected by relative majority and three by proportional representation. The current president of the municipality is María Teresa Pérez Romero.

== Demographics ==
In the 2010 Mexican Census, the municipality of Indaparapeo recorded a population of 16,427 inhabitants living in 3791 households. The 2015 Intercensal Survey estimated a population of 16,990 inhabitants in Indaparapeo.

There are 39 localities in the municipality, of which two are classified as urban:

- the municipal seat also known as Indaparapeo, which recorded a population of 6791 inhabitants in the 2010 Census; and
- San Lucas Pío, located 5 kilometres (3.1 mi) east of the municipal seat on Mexican Federal Highway 126, which recorded a population of 3056 inhabitants in the 2010 Census.

== Economy ==
Important economic activities in Indaparapeo include agriculture and brickmaking.
