= Álvaro Obregón Municipality =

Álvaro Obregón
- Municipality
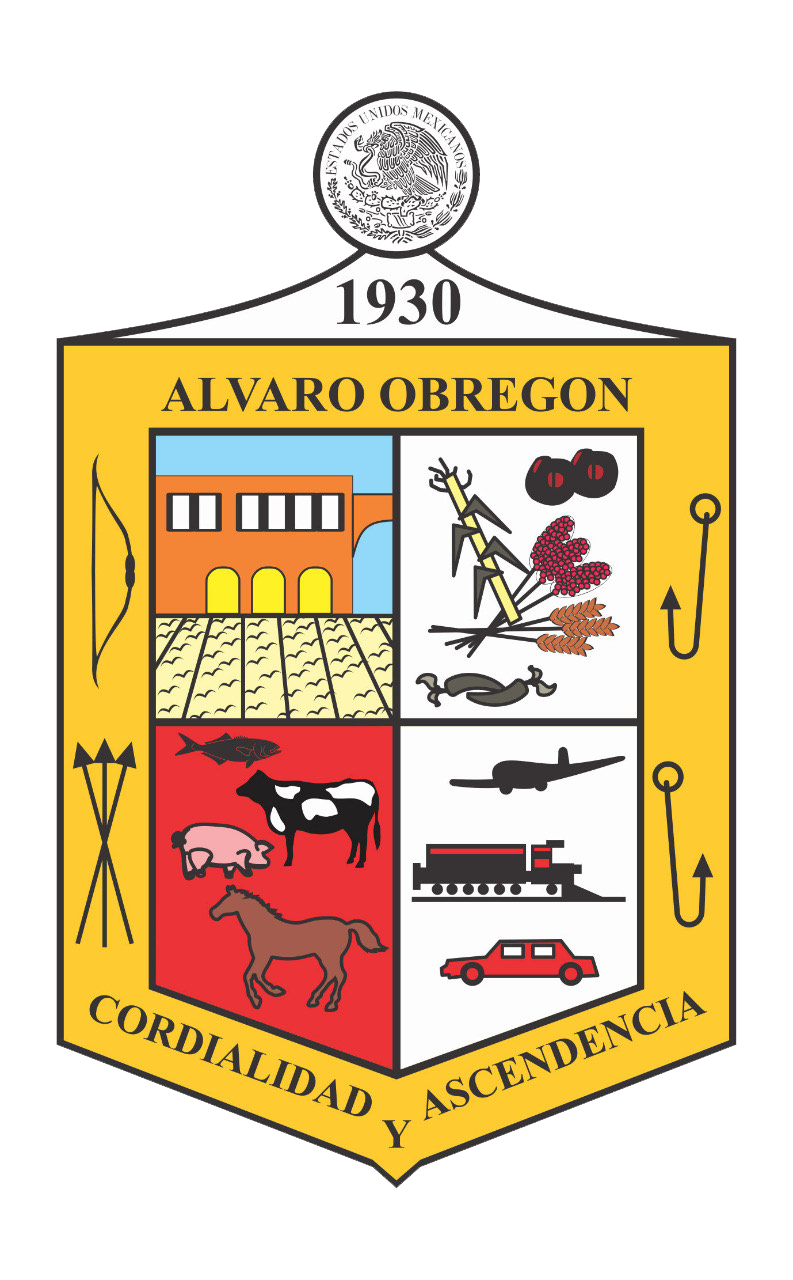
- Coat of arms

- Location of Álvaro Obregón in Michoacán
- Coordinates: 19°48′N 101°02′W
- Country: Mexico
- State: Michoacán
- Established: 8 February 1930
- Municipal seat: Álvaro Obregón

Area
  - Total: 162.64 km^{2} (62.80 sq mi)
- Elevation: 1,800 m (5,900 ft)

Population (2020)
  - Total: 23,000
  - Density: 140/km^{2} (370/sq mi)
- Time zone: UTC-6 (CST)

Álvaro Obregón is a municipality in the Mexican state of Michoacán. It is located north of the state and about 26 kilometres (16 mi) from the city of Morelia. It has an area of 162.64 square kilometres (62.80 sq mi) and had a population of 18,696 inhabitants as of 2005. The municipality is named in honor of Álvaro Obregón, the President of Mexico from 1920 to 1924.

The municipality contains 35 localities, which include Álvaro Obregón, Tzintzimeo, El Calvario, Felipe Carrillo Puerto, and Lázaro Cárdenas.
