= Tancanhuitz de Santos =

Municipality and town of San Luis Potosí, Mexico

Tancanhuitz
- Municipality and Town
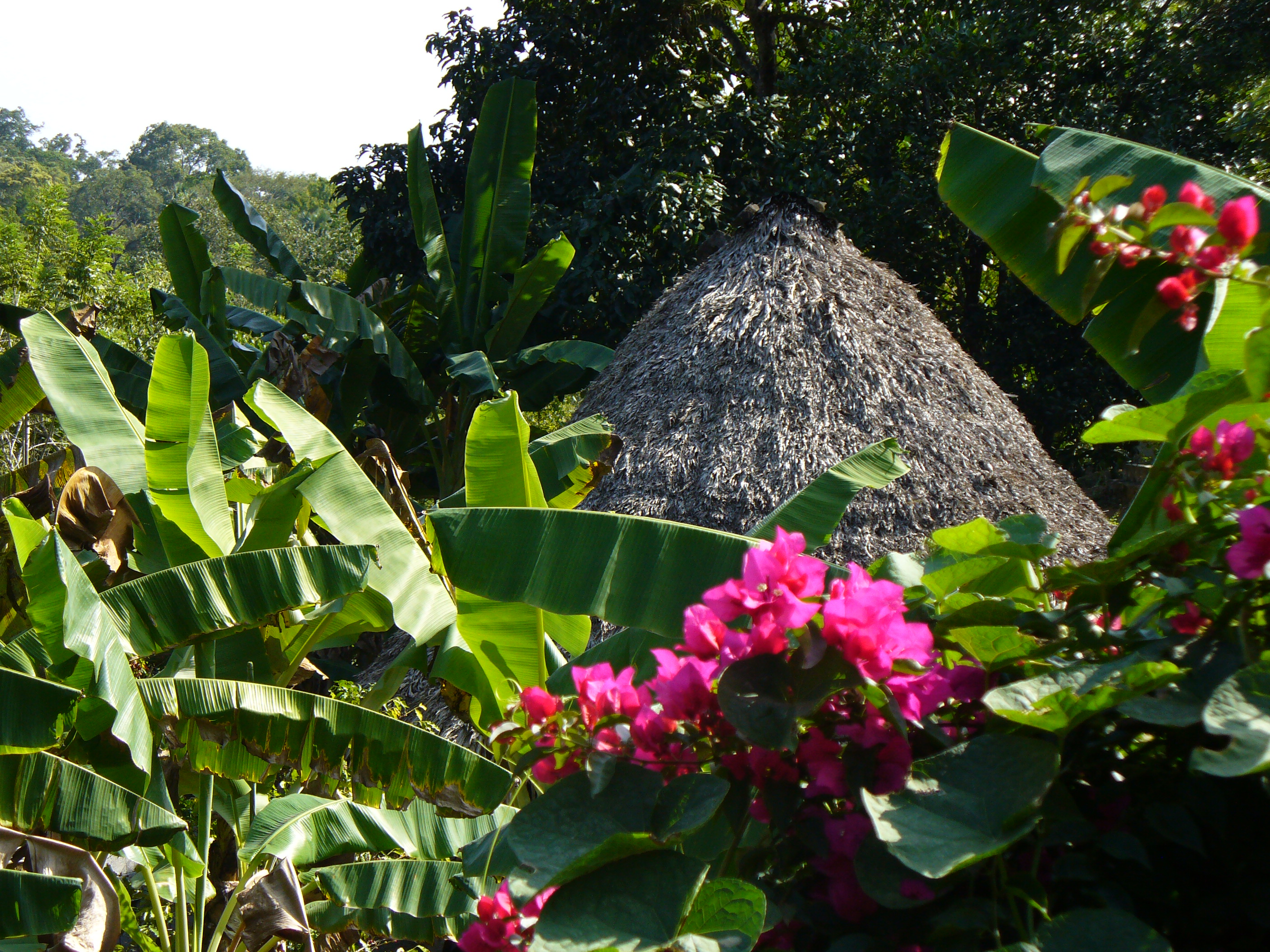
- Traditional Huastec hut in the Coyol Ja community, municipality of Tancanhuitz

- Location of the municipality in San Luis Potosí
- Coordinates: 21°36′N 98°58′W
- Country: Mexico
- State: San Luis Potosí
- Established: 1522

Government
  - Municipal president: Vacant

Area
  - Total: 134.05 km^{2} (51.76 sq mi)
- Elevation: 200 m (660 ft)

Population (2005)
  - Total: 25,055
  - Density: 152.89/km^{2} (396.0/sq mi)
- Time zone: UTC-6 (Zona Centro)
- Website: tancanhuitzaccionesquehablan.gob.mx (2021–24)

Tancanhuitz is a town and one of the 58 municipalities of the state of San Luis Potosí in central Mexico. It is located in the southeastern part of the state, approximately 330 km (210 mi) from the city of San Luis Potosí. The municipality covers an area of 134.05 km^{2} (51.76 sq mi).

== Name ==
The name Tancanhuitz comes from the Wastek language, and means Place of Flowers or Canoe of yellow flowers.

The name Tancanhuitz was already in use by the time of the 1826 constitution of San Luis Potosí, which named Tancanhuitz as one of ten sections of the state. In 1932, the state government established the location as a city with the name Pedro Antonio Santos. The name was officially changed to Ciudad Santos in 1975, then to Tancanhuitz de Santos in 1981. Another change in 2003 established the current official name as Tancanhuitz.

== Demography ==
As of the 2005 census, it had a total population of 20,495, of which 10,180 were men and 10,315 were women.

== Geography ==
=== Location ===
Tancanhuitz is located in the southeastern part of the state, at 21° 36’ northern latitude, and 98° 58’ western longitude. It is at an average height of 200 meters above sea level.

The municipality is bordered by the municipalities of Aquismón and Tanlajás to the north, Tanlajás and San Antonio to the east, Huehuetlán and Coxcatlán to the south, and Aquismón to the west.

=== Orography and Hydrography ===
The territory covered by the municipality is mostly rugged, although there is a small flat region to the north of the municipal capital. *The geology of the region is classified as Mesozoic,* and the land is used primarily for raising livestock, forestry, and agriculture. The municipality belongs to the Panuco hydrologic region. Its water resources are supplied by the Oxitipa, Tampaón, and Coy Rivers. There are also some seasonal creeks there, such as the Tancanhuitz, as well as several springs.
