= Municipalities of San Luis Potosí =

List of municipalities of Mexican state

Map of Mexico with San Luis Potosí highlighted

San Luis Potosí is a state in central and northern Mexico that is divided into 59 municipalities. According to the 2020 INEGI census, it is the 19th most populated of Mexico's 31 states, with 2,822,255 inhabitants and the 15th largest by land area spanning 61,138.0 square kilometres (23,605.5 sq mi). The largest municipality by population is the capital of San Luis Potosí, with 911,908 residents (32.31% of the state's total), while the smallest is Armadillo with 4,013 residents. The largest municipality by land area is Santo Domingo which spans 4,322.60 km^{2} (1,669.0 sq mi), and the smallest is Huehuetlán with 71.50 km^{2} (27.61 sq mi). The newest municipality is Villa de Pozos, established in 2024 from the municipality of San Luis Potosí; followed by El Naranjo, created out of Ciudad del Maíz, and Matlapa, carved from Tamazunchale, both established in 1994.

Municipalities in San Luis Potosí are administratively autonomous of the state according to the 115th article of the 1917 Constitution of Mexico. Every three years, citizens elect a municipal president (Spanish: presidente municipal) by a plurality voting system who heads a concurrently elected municipal council (ayuntamiento) responsible for providing all the public services for their constituents. The municipal council consists of a variable number of trustees and councillors (regidores y síndicos). Municipalities are responsible for public services (such as water and sewerage), street lighting, public safety, traffic, and the maintenance of public parks, gardens and cemeteries. They may also assist the state and federal governments in education, emergency fire and medical services, environmental protection and maintenance of monuments and historical landmarks. Since 1984, they have had the power to collect property taxes and user fees, although more funds are obtained from the state and federal governments than from their own income.

== Municipalities ==
Largest municipalities in San Luis Potosí by population

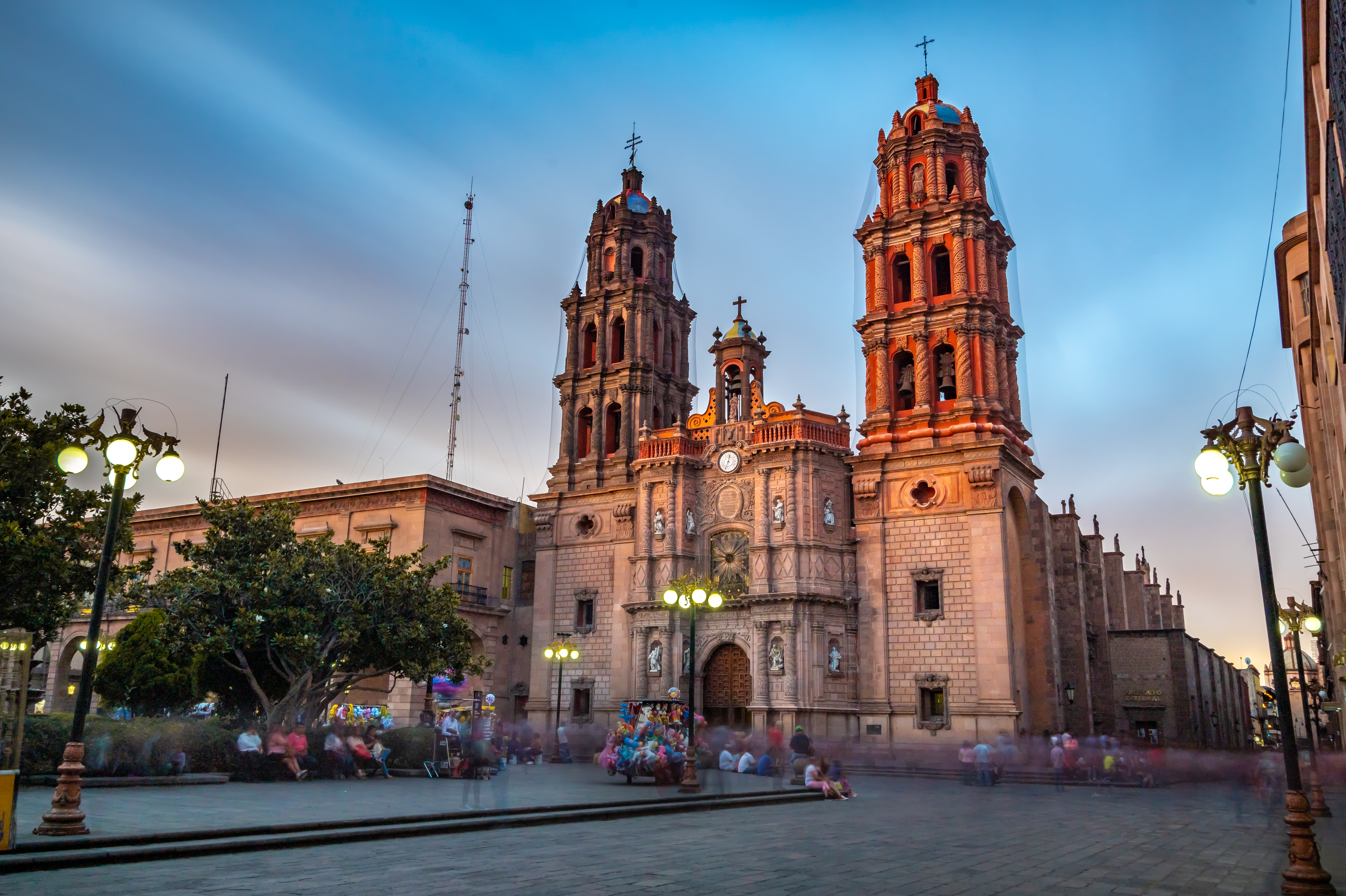
San Luis Potosí is the capital and most populous municipality in San Luis Potosí.

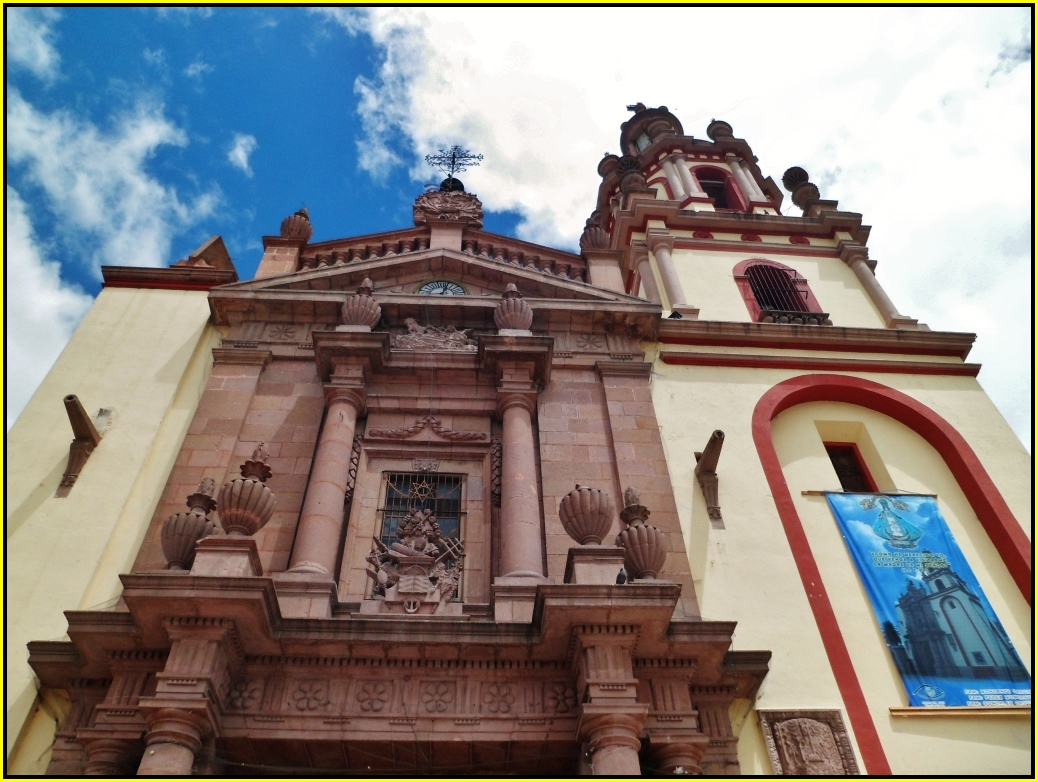
Soledad, second largest municipality by population in San Luis Potosí

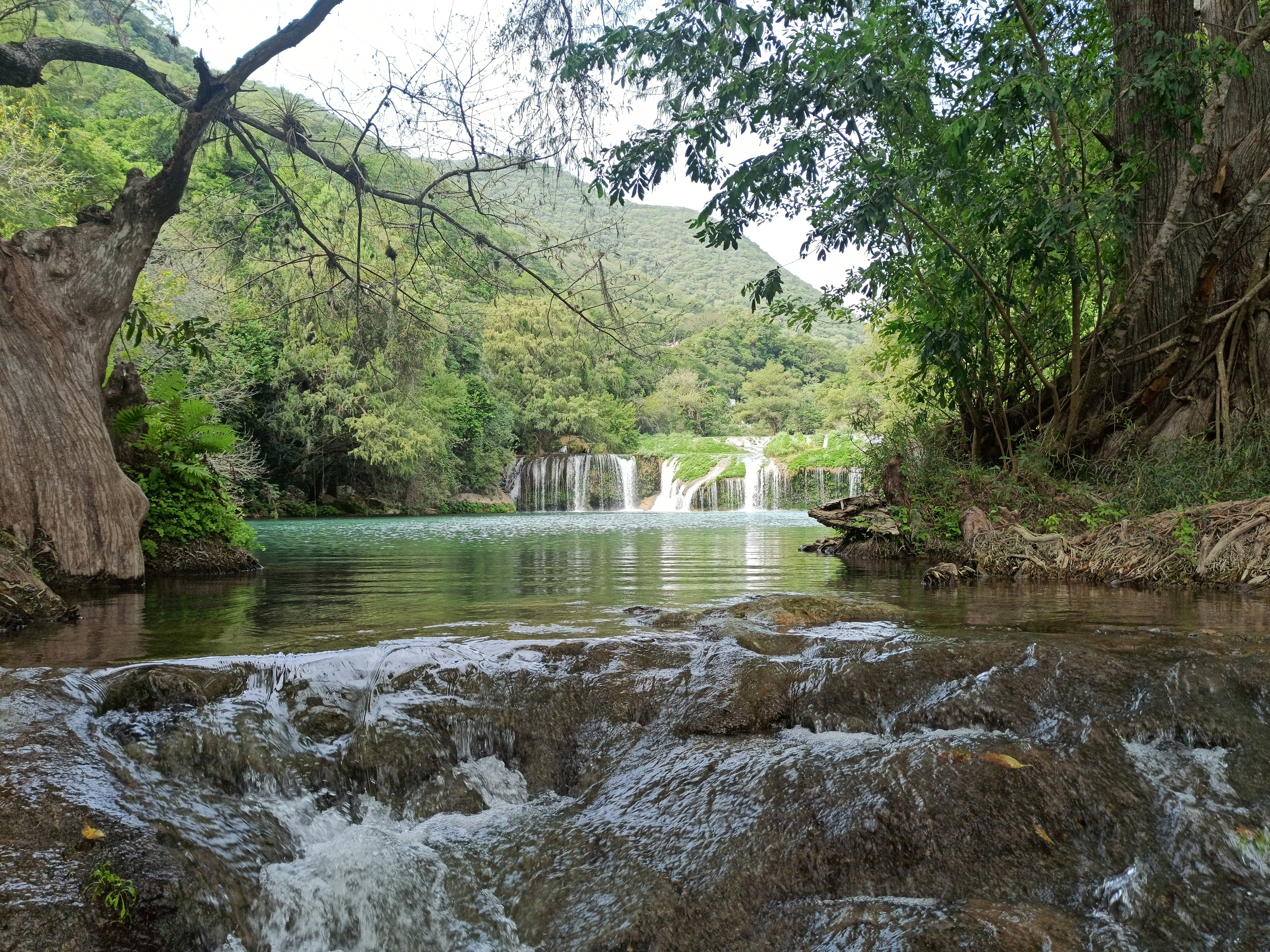
Ciudad Valles is the third most populous municipality in San Luis Potosí.

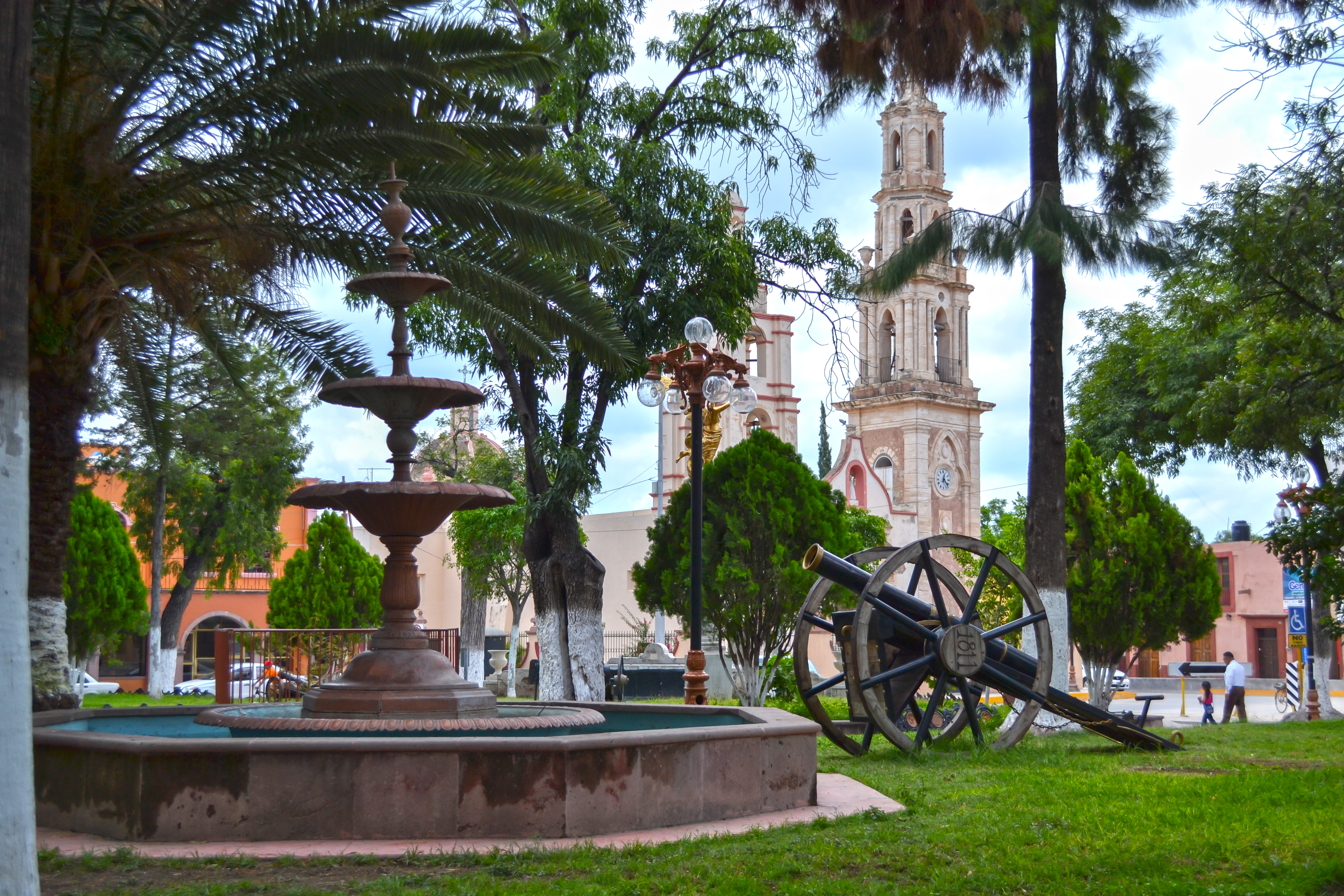
Matehuala, fourth largest municipality by population

† State capital

Municipalities of San Luis Potosí
Name	Municipal seat	Population (2020)	Population (2010)	Change	Land area		Population density (2020)	Incorporation date
Name	Municipal seat	Population (2020)	Population (2010)	Change	km^{2}	sq mi	Population density (2020)	Incorporation date
Ahualulco	Ahualulco	18,974	18,644	+1.8%	775.4	299.4	24.5/km^{2} (63.4/sq mi)	October 29, 1823
Alaquines	Alaquines	7,785	8,186	−4.9%	586.2	226.3	13.3/km^{2} (34.4/sq mi)	July 19, 1826
Aquismón	Aquismón	48,359	47,423	+2.0%	794.2	306.6	60.9/km^{2} (157.7/sq mi)	July 19, 1826
Armadillo	Armadillo de los Infante	4,013	4,436	−9.5%	623.4	240.7	6.4/km^{2} (16.7/sq mi)	July 19, 1826
Axtla (Note: Axtla was named Villa Alfredo M. Terrazas from 1932 to 1981.)	Axtla de Terrazas	32,544	33,245	−2.1%	191.2	73.8	170.2/km^{2} (440.8/sq mi)	July 19, 1826
Cárdenas	Cárdenas	18,317	18,937	−3.3%	390.5	150.8	46.9/km^{2} (121.5/sq mi)	November 16, 1920
Catorce	Real de Catorce	9,579	9,716	−1.4%	1,944.9	750.9	4.9/km^{2} (12.8/sq mi)	July 19, 1826
Cedral	Cedral	19,840	18,485	+7.3%	1,169.4	451.5	17.0/km^{2} (43.9/sq mi)	July 19, 1826
Cerritos	Cerritos	22,075	21,394	+3.2%	962.4	371.6	22.9/km^{2} (59.4/sq mi)	October 5, 1827
Cerro de San Pedro	Cerro de San Pedro	5,050	4,021	+25.6%	122.6	47.3	41.2/km^{2} (106.7/sq mi)	July 19, 1826
Charcas	Charcas	21,814	21,138	+3.2%	2,156.7	832.7	10.1/km^{2} (26.2/sq mi)	July 19, 1826
Ciudad del Maíz (Note: Ciudad del Maíz was originally incorporated as Valle del Maíz, changing its name on April 26, 1830.)	Ciudad del Maíz	30,320	31,323	−3.2%	3,150.4	1,216.4	9.6/km^{2} (24.9/sq mi)	July 19, 1826
Ciudad Fernández (Note: Ciudad Fernández was originally incorporated as Villa de Santa Elena, changing its name on September 4, 1828. The municipality was absorbed into Ríoverde from 1944 to 1958.)	Ciudad Fernández	48,106	43,528	+10.5%	518.4	200.2	92.8/km^{2} (240.3/sq mi)	July 19, 1826
Ciudad Valles (Note: Ciudad Valles was originally incorporated as Villa de Valles, changing its name on April 26, 1830.)	Ciudad Valles	179,371	167,713	+7.0%	2,423.6	935.8	74.0/km^{2} (191.7/sq mi)	July 19, 1826
Coxcatlán	Coxcatlán	15,660	17,015	−8.0%	90.9	35.1	172.3/km^{2} (446.2/sq mi)	July 19, 1826
Ébano	Ébano	40,899	41,529	−1.5%	698.5	269.7	58.6/km^{2} (151.7/sq mi)	June 6, 1963
El Naranjo	El Naranjo	20,959	20,495	+2.3%	821.3	317.1	25.5/km^{2} (66.1/sq mi)	December 2, 1994
Guadalcázar	Guadalcázar	25,119	25,985	−3.3%	3,745.9	1,446.3	6.7/km^{2} (17.4/sq mi)	July 19, 1826
Huehuetlán (Note: Huehuetlán was absorbed into Tancanhuitz from 1946 to 1955.)	Huehuetlán	15,334	15,311	+0.2%	71.5	27.6	214.5/km^{2} (555.5/sq mi)	July 19, 1826
Lagunillas	Lagunillas	5,453	5,774	−5.6%	535.5	206.8	10.2/km^{2} (26.4/sq mi)	October 5, 1827
Matehuala	Matehuala	102,199	91,522	+11.7%	1,301.7	502.6	78.5/km^{2} (203.3/sq mi)	July 19, 1826
Matlapa	Matlapa	28,996	30,299	−4.3%	117.2	45.3	247.4/km^{2} (640.8/sq mi)	December 2, 1994
Mexquitic (Note: Mexquitic was originally incorporated as San Miguel Mezquitic, changing its name on November 1, 1917.)	Mexquitic de Carmona	58,469	53,442	+9.4%	877.1	338.7	66.7/km^{2} (172.7/sq mi)	July 19, 1826
Moctezuma (Note: Moctezuma was originally incorporated as Hedionda, changing its name on January 22, 1863.)	Moctezuma	19,036	19,327	−1.5%	1,291.5	498.7	14.7/km^{2} (38.2/sq mi)	July 19, 1826
Rayón (Note: Rayón was originally incorporated as Gamotes, changing its name on June 10, 1868.)	Rayón	15,301	15,707	−2.6%	786.4	303.6	19.5/km^{2} (50.4/sq mi)	July 19, 1826
Rioverde	Rioverde	97,943	91,924	+6.5%	3,064.0	1,183.0	32.0/km^{2} (82.8/sq mi)	July 19, 1826
Salinas	Salinas de Hidalgo	31,107	30,190	+3.0%	1,729.9	667.9	18.0/km^{2} (46.6/sq mi)	July 19, 1826
San Antonio (Note: San Antonio was absorbed into Tampamolón from 1944 to 1948.)	San Antonio	9,382	9,390	−0.1%	94.7	36.6	99.1/km^{2} (256.6/sq mi)	July 19, 1826
San Ciro	San Ciro de Acosta	10,215	10,171	+0.4%	639.2	246.8	16.0/km^{2} (41.4/sq mi)	February 16, 1853
San Luis Potosí	San Luis Potosí†	911,908	772,604	+18.0%	1,482.0	572.2	615.3/km^{2} (1,593.7/sq mi)	July 19, 1826
San Martín Chalchicuautla	San Martín Chalchicuautla	18,468	21,347	−13.5%	413.1	159.5	44.7/km^{2} (115.8/sq mi)	July 19, 1826
San Nicolás Tolentino	San Nicolás Tolentino	4,779	5,466	−12.6%	692.4	267.3	6.9/km^{2} (17.9/sq mi)	July 19, 1826
Santa Catarina	Santa Catarina	12,163	11,835	+2.8%	640.6	247.3	19.0/km^{2} (49.2/sq mi)	November 6, 1876
Santa María del Río	Santa María del Río	39,880	40,326	−1.1%	1,701.0	656.8	23.4/km^{2} (60.7/sq mi)	July 19, 1826
Santo Domingo	Santo Domingo	10,785	12,043	−10.4%	4,322.6	1,669.0	2.5/km^{2} (6.5/sq mi)	December 24, 1857
Soledad	Soledad de Graciano Sánchez	332,072	267,839	+24.0%	305.7	118.0	1,086.3/km^{2} (2,813.4/sq mi)	July 19, 1826
Tamasopo (Note: Tamasopo was originally incorporated as Palma, changing its name on December 6, 1932.)	Tamasopo	29,184	28,848	+1.2%	1,322.9	510.8	22.1/km^{2} (57.1/sq mi)	July 19, 1826
Tamazunchale	Tamazunchale	95,037	96,820	−1.8%	353.7	136.6	268.7/km^{2} (695.9/sq mi)	July 19, 1826
Tampacán	Tampacán	14,348	15,838	−9.4%	187.3	72.3	76.6/km^{2} (198.4/sq mi)	December 14, 1861
Tampamolón	Tampamolón Corona	13,603	14,274	−4.7%	262.7	101.4	51.8/km^{2} (134.1/sq mi)	July 19, 1826
Tamuín	Tamuín	36,968	37,956	−2.6%	1,843.3	711.7	20.1/km^{2} (51.9/sq mi)	July 19, 1826
Tancanhuitz (Note: Tancanhuitz was known as Ciudad Santos from 1932 to 1981.)	Tancanhuitz de Santos	20,300	21,039	−3.5%	137.4	53.1	147.7/km^{2} (382.7/sq mi)	July 19, 1826
Tancuayalab	San Vicente Tancuayalab	14,945	14,958	−0.1%	518.7	200.3	28.8/km^{2} (74.6/sq mi)	July 19, 1826
Tanlajás	Tanlajás	18,208	19,312	−5.7%	374.8	144.7	48.6/km^{2} (125.8/sq mi)	July 19, 1826
Tanquián	Tanquián de Escobedo	13,448	14,382	−6.5%	143.4	55.4	93.8/km^{2} (242.9/sq mi)	November 26, 1870
Tierra Nueva (Note: Tierra Nueva was absorbed into Santa María del Río from 1946 to 1950.)	Tierra Nueva	7,966	9,024	−11.7%	478.6	184.8	16.6/km^{2} (43.1/sq mi)	July 19, 1826
Vanegas	Vanegas	7,557	7,902	−4.4%	2,799.5	1,080.9	2.7/km^{2} (7.0/sq mi)	November 10, 1922
Venado	Venado	14,188	14,492	−2.1%	1,301.0	502.3	10.9/km^{2} (28.2/sq mi)	July 19, 1826
Villa de Arista (Note: Villa de Arista was absorbed into Villa Hidalgo from 1946 to 1971.)	Villa de Arista	17,258	15,528	+11.1%	586.7	226.5	29.4/km^{2} (76.2/sq mi)	October 13, 1857
Villa de Arriaga	Villa de Arriaga	18,206	16,316	+11.6%	878.1	339.0	20.7/km^{2} (53.7/sq mi)	May 7, 1874
Villa de Guadalupe	Villa de Guadalupe	9,277	9,779	−5.1%	1,912.4	738.4	4.9/km^{2} (12.6/sq mi)	December 17, 1857
Villa de La Paz	Villa de La Paz	5,298	5,350	−1.0%	143.8	55.5	36.8/km^{2} (95.4/sq mi)	May 31, 1921
Villa de Pozos (Note: The municipality of Villa de Pozos was created from the borough (delegación) of the same name in the municipality of San Luis Potosí on July 22, 2024, and this change is not included in the 2020 or 2010 census figures. The population of Villa de Pozos is 148,165 as of the 2020 census, and its area is 147.79 square kilometres (57.06 sq mi). Villa de Pozos had previously been a municipality from 1826 to 1946.)	Villa de Pozos	—	—	—	—	—	—	July 22, 2024
Villa de Ramos	Villa de Ramos	38,389	37,928	+1.2%	2,492.2	962.2	15.4/km^{2} (39.9/sq mi)	July 19, 1826
Villa de Reyes (Note: Villa de Reyes was originally incorporated as Valle de San Francisco, changing its name on May 16, 1862.)	Villa de Reyes	52,912	46,898	+12.8%	1,019.9	393.8	51.9/km^{2} (134.4/sq mi)	July 19, 1826
Villa Hidalgo (Note: Villa Hidalgo was originally incorporated as Iturbide, changing its name on January 3, 1927.)	Villa Hidalgo	15,458	14,876	+3.9%	1,496.5	577.8	10.3/km^{2} (26.8/sq mi)	July 19, 1826
Villa Juárez (Note: Villa Juárez was originally incorporated as Santa Gertrudis de la Carbonera, changing its name to Carbonera on 1859 and to its current name on November 6, 1928.)	Villa Juárez	10,304	10,174	+1.3%	640.1	247.1	16.1/km^{2} (41.7/sq mi)	September 26, 1829
Xilitla	Xilitla	49,741	51,498	−3.4%	398.6	153.9	124.8/km^{2} (323.2/sq mi)	July 19, 1826
Zaragoza	Villa de Zaragoza	27,386	24,596	+11.3%	614.2	237.1	44.6/km^{2} (115.5/sq mi)	November 3, 1882
San Luis Potosí	—	2,822,255	2,585,518	+9.2%	61,138.0	23,605.5	46.2/km^{2} (119.6/sq mi)	—
Mexico	—	126,014,024	112,336,538	+12.2%	1,960,646.7	757,010	64.3/km^{2} (166.5/sq mi)	—
