= Mexican Federal Highway 69 =

Highway in Mexico

Federal Highway 69
- Carretera federal 69

Route information
- Maintained by Secretariat of Infrastructure, Communications and Transportation
- Length: 105.43 km (65.51 mi)

Major junctions
- North end: Fed. 70 in Rioverde, San Luis Potosí
- South end: Fed. 120 in Jalpan de Serra, Querétaro

Location
- Country: Mexico

Highway system
- Mexican Federal Highways; List; Autopistas
← Fed. 68	→ Fed. 70

Federal Highway 69 (Carretera Federal 69) (Fed. 69) is a toll-free (libre) part of the federal highways corridors (los corredores carreteros federales) of Mexico. The highway connects Fed. 70 in Rioverde, San Luis Potosí to Fed. 120 in Jalpan de Serra, Querétaro.

== Major intersections ==
State	Municipality	Location	km	mi	Destinations	Notes
Querétaro	Jalpan de Serra	Jalpan de Serra			Fed. 120 – San Juan del Río, Xilitla	Southern terminus
Querétaro	Arroyo Seco	Arroyo Seco			SH 8 – Rayón, Santa Catarina, Lagunillas	
San Luis Potosí	San Ciro de Acosta	No major junctions				
San Luis Potosí	Lagunillas	No major junctions				
San Luis Potosí	San Ciro de Acosta	No major junctions				
San Luis Potosí	Rioverde	Rioverde			Fed. 70 – San Luis Potosí, Ciudad Fernández, Ciudad Valles	Northern terminus; road continues as José María Morelos
1.000 mi = 1.609 km; 1.000 km = 0.621 mi
