= Santa María del Río, San Luis Potosí =

Coordinates: 21°48′N 100°45′W

Santa María del Río
- Municipality

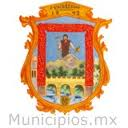
- Coat of arms

- Location in Mexico Santa María del Río (Mexico)
- Country: Mexico
- State: San Luis Potosí

Population (2020)
  - Municipality: 39,880
- Demonym: (in Spanish)
- Time zone: UTC−6 (CST)

Santa María del Río is one of the 58 municipalities that make up the Mexican state of San Luis Potosí. The municipality is located in the southern part of the state, approximately 48 kilometers east of the city of San Luis Potosí. Santa María del Río has a land area of 1,655 square kilometers, with 37,290 inhabitants. As of 2005, 12,000 were living in the town of Santa María del Río. The area is famous for its rebozos, being the cradle of the blue and white rebozo de bolita. The Rebozo Caramelo is woven there.

== Geography ==
Santa María del Río is located in the center of the southern part of the San Luis Potosí, at an average altitude of 1,710 meters above sea level. The municipality is bordered on the north by the municipalities of Zaragoza, San Nicolás Tolentino and Ciudad Fernández, to the east is San Luis Potosí, to the south is Tierra Nueva and to the west is Villa de Reyes.

Santa María del Río lies on the Mexican Mesa del Centro on the western edge of the Sierra Madre Oriental and consequently has a mountainous terrain, with various hills: the Membrillo, the Rincón Pilitas, the Duraznillo, San Pablo, the Platanito, San Antonio, the Banqueta, the Pachona, the Joya, the Mesa Prieta, the Barbechos, as well as the Sierra de Bagres. The area rests on Mesozoic rocks. The land is mainly used for livestock, forestry and agriculture, in that order.

The rocks in Santa María del Río are mineral rich, and several mines have operated there. The locale is noted for its cinnabar, an ore of mercury.

Santa María del Río lies in the Tamuin River basin, a tributary of the Panuco River. Its major drainage is the Santa Maria River. The thermal springs in the hills at Blameario de Lourdes provide the state with its sparkling mineral water, Agua de Lourdes.

Because of its elevation, Santa María del Río has a dry, temperate climate, cooler in the highlands and warmer in the lowlands. Almost all of the rain falls between May and September, the total annual average rainfall for those months is 362 mm (14¼ in.). It never freezes, the record low was 4.5 °C in January and the record high was 37 °C in May, with an average annual temperature of 18.5 °C.

== History ==
The area where the municipality of Santa María del Río now is, was a contact zone between various Mesoamerican cultures. Archaeological evidence shows that the region was once occupied by people of advanced culture, sedentary farmers who built permanent structures. However, sometime prior to the arrival of the Spanish conquistadors nomads invaded the area and there were no existing settlements when the Spanish came. However, after the fall of Tenochtitlan, the Otomi began to move north as allies of the Spanish. Otherwise, the semi-nomadic Guachichil were the local inhabitants at the time of the founding of the municipality.

The date of the founding of the town has been controversial. It is often listed as 1589, citing noted historian Primo Feliciano Velázquez's pamphlet Descubrimiento y Conquista de San Luis Potosí (Discovery and Conquest of San Luis Potosí); however, there is a Franciscan baptismal document dated 15 August 1542 for some Guachichil indicating that the settlement was already in place, and that instead of founding the town Viceroy Luis de Velazco merely gave it the name: Santa María del Río. The Franciscan Convent was built in 1604. The settled inhabitants were Guachichil and Otomi, with the lands being divided between them by a road and the church.

Cinnabar mining started with the general opening of mines in the province; however their mining techniques were labor-intensive, and the mines were subject to frequent flooding.

The bridge over the Santa Maria river was begun in 1844, but it was not completed until the French intervention in Mexico. By the year 1853, the town of Santa María del Río had twenty thousand inhabitants. In 1866 telegraph service was instituted, mostly through the efforts of General Tomás Mejía. In May 1914, the town of Santa María del Río was the site for fierce fighting between the 150 occupying huertistas and the Constitutionalists. The 400 Constitutionalists captured the town. Electrification of the municipality began in 1927, under the direction of Governor Dr Abel Cano.

=== Sites of interest ===
- former Franciscan Convent
- former Hacienda Santo Domingo
- former Hacienda El Fuerte
- former Hacienda Labor del Río
- former Hacienda Pozo del Carmen
- Lourdes springs
- Ojo Caliente springs
- former Hacienda Villela

== Government ==
The current president of the municipality is Israel Reyna Rosas, of the Institutional Revolutionary Party (PRI). The town Santa María del Río is the administrative seat. The municipality has 302 other settlements, among which are:

- El Álamo, population 182
- Estancia de Atotonilco, population 693
- Balneario de Lourdes, population 145
- Barrancas del Pueblito (Cuesta Colorada), population 204
- Barranca, population 472
- Bernalejo, population 537
- La Boquineta, population 211
- Cañada de Yáñez, population 941
- La Cardona, population 671
- El Carmen, population 390
- El Cerrito, population 692
- Cerrito de Varas Blancas, population 152
- Cerro Prieto, population 226
- Ejido la Pitahaya (Santo Domingo), population 1105
- Enramadas, population 1283
- Entronque a Tierra Nueva, population 152
- El Fuerte, population 1631
- Guanajuatito (Cerrito de la Cruz), population 427
- La Labor del Río (Hacienda la Labor del Río), population 204
- Llano de Guadalupe, population 219
- El Molino Cinco Señores, population 196
- Ojo Caliente, population 1389
- Paso de los Torres, population 148
- Peregrina de Arriba, population 201
- Peregrina de Abajo, population 272
- Presa de Dolores, population 1057
- El Pueblito, population 290
- San José Alburquerque, population 266
- San Juan Capistrán, population 326
- Fracción Sánchez, population 920
- El Soyate, population 360
- El Tepozán, population 339
- Tierra Quemada, population 143
- Fracción el Toro, population 582
- El Tule, population 348
- Fracción Uno Ex-hacienda Santo Domingo, population 471
- Villela, population 773
- La Yerbabuena, population 797
