= Villa de Guadalupe =

Villa de Guadalupe may refer to:

- Villa de Guadalupe, Mexico City, Mexico
- Villa de Guadalupe, San Luis Potosí, Mexico
