= Villa Juárez, San Luis Potosí =

Municipality and town in San Luis Potosí, Mexico

Villa Juárez
- Municipality
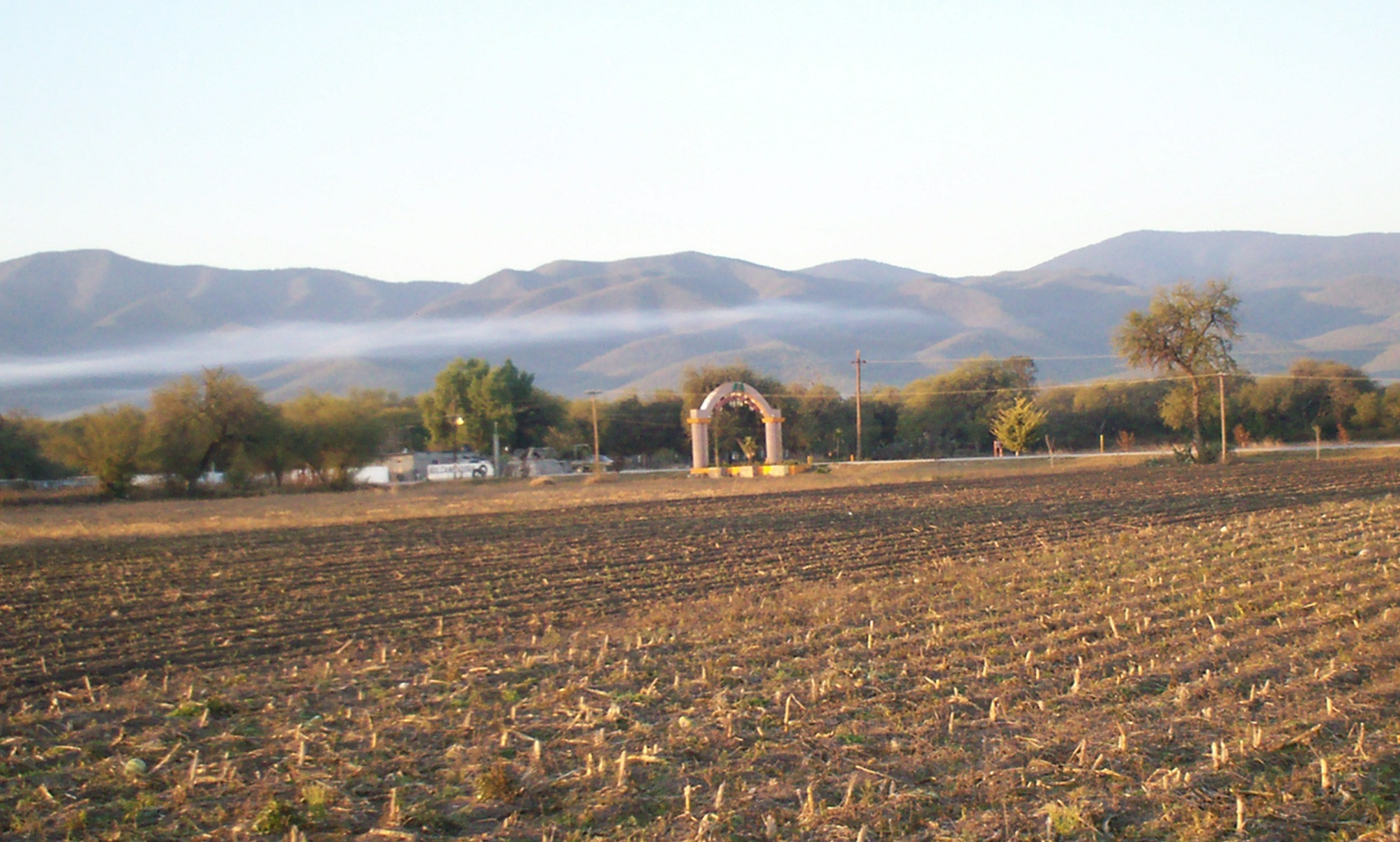

- Location in Mexico Villa Juárez (Mexico)
- Country: Mexico
- State: San Luis Potosí
- Demonym: (in Spanish)
- Time zone: UTC−6 (CST)

Villa Juárez is a municipality and town located in the central part of the Mexican state of San Luis Potosí. It was founded in 1643 as Santa Gertrudis de Carbonera. In 1928 the name was changed to Villa Juárez to honor Benito Juárez, one of México's most admired presidents.

== Geography ==
=== Location ===
Its geographic location is 22°19′18″N 100°15′55″W and its altitude is 1100 meters above sea level. The municipality extends throughout 18 small villages including El Granjenal, Palo Seco, and Puerta del Río. Villa Juarez is surrounded by Cerritos to the north, Rio Verde to the east and south, and with San Nicolás Tolentino to the west.

== History ==
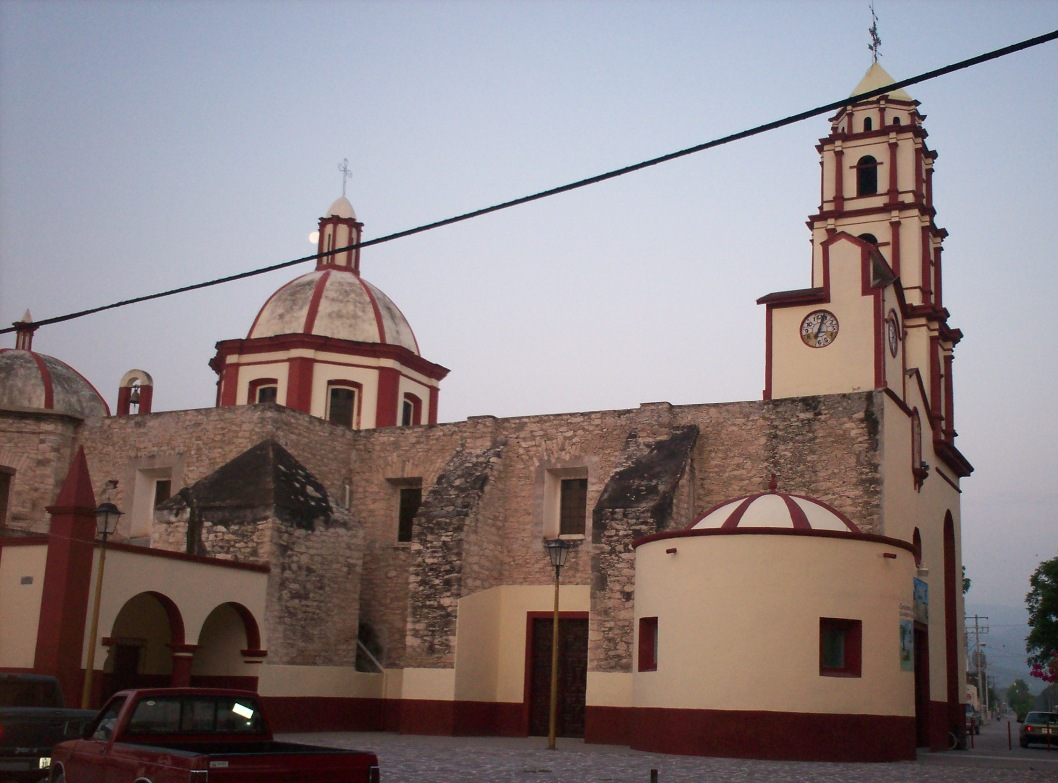
Church of Santa Gertrudis

Ex Hacienda Ojo de Leon was the founding site of Carbonera / Villa Juarez in 1592, property previously owned by Heriberto Ruiz Meza, and currently owned by Roberto Ruiz Gloria.

Villa Juárez was founded in 1643 as Santa Gertrudis de Carbonera and in 1928, the name was changed to Villa Juárez due to the expansion of population.

== Economy ==
Agriculture made up most of Villa Juárez's economy. Hot peppers (mainly serrano) and corn were the major elements of this economy. Lack of capital to invest in farming has recently declined production. In the 19th and 20th centuries sulfur mining at Guaxcama was also important.

== Culture ==
Villa Juárez's population, like many other Mexican towns and cities, are mostly part of Roman Catholicism. Its biggest tradition is to host a traveling carnival in honor of its patron saint, Gertrude the Great, mostly known as "Santa Gertrudis". It begins about two weeks before the main day, 16 November. This carnival is made up of dozens of booths that sell artifacts, ceramics and artifacts, regional delicacies, food, drinks, games, literature, and small widgets among other things. Rides are also a main attraction of the carnival. A stage is also assembled for shows, regional and national folklore dances, musicians, speeches, and plays. Aside from this festival, Villa Juárez and its surrounding municipalities, often hold events known as "Jaripeos" which involve the riding of bulls without much, if any, protection gear. Many tourists come from all parts of the state of San Luis Potosí and from the United States (such as Texas, Illinois, Georgia, California, Wyoming and Nebraska) for this traditional event. These tourists also Vacation in Villa Juarez mainly in the Summer and Winter time. Many of the natives like to go back to Villa Juarez to get married, baptize children etc. around this time as well.

Within this municipality there still live indigenous groups of people such as the Pame (Xiu). This municipality has been a victim of mass migration to the U.S. Most of the remaining inhabitants are small children, middle-age females, and senior citizens. Several internationally known musical bands have come from this municipality: Grupo Bryndis, and Agua Azul.

People that have migrated to the United States of America from Villa Juárez are so proud of their town, that they have founded various organizations and clubs throughout the States to send help to their town. Some of these clubs include: Fundación Villa Juárez de Houston, Texas; Club Social Villa Juárez en Dallas, Texas; Club Social Villa Juárez en Illinois; and Club Social Villa Juárez en Nebraska. There are comments that clubs will form in Gonzáles, Texas and in Atlanta, Georgia. These clubs have made many contributions to Villa Juárez. For example, Fundación Villa Juárez de Houston, Texas took the initiative to construct the Municipal Market (Mercado Municipal).

== Municipal Presidents ==
- Heriberto Ruiz Meza
- Urbano Mata Zapata (1980-1982)
- Víctor García Almazán (2001-2003)
- Juan Izaguirre Ostiguin (2004-2006)
- Everardo Izaguirre Gloria (2007-2009)
- Jesus Ruiz Castillo (2010-2012)
- Ignacio Chavira (2012-2015)
- Juan Manuel Sánchez Martinez (2015-2018)
- Lisa Avigail (2018-2021)

== Bibliography ==
- Roque, Alexandro (2004) Villa Juárez La bella villa
