= Quercus charcasana =

Scientific classification
- Kingdom: Plantae
- Clade: Embryophytes
- Clade: Tracheophytes
- Clade: Angiosperms
- Clade: Eudicots
- Clade: Rosids
- Order: Fagales
- Family: Fagaceae
- Genus: Quercus
- Subgenus: Quercus subg. Quercus
- Section: Quercus sect. Lobatae
- Species: Q. charcasana

Binomial name
- Quercus charcasana Trel. ex A.Camus

Species of flowering plant

Quercus charcasana is a species of oak. It is a shrub native to San Luis Potosí in northeastern Mexico. The species is named for Charcas in the Sierra Madre Oriental where it was first collected.
