= Cedral, San Luis Potosí =

Cedral
- Municipality and town
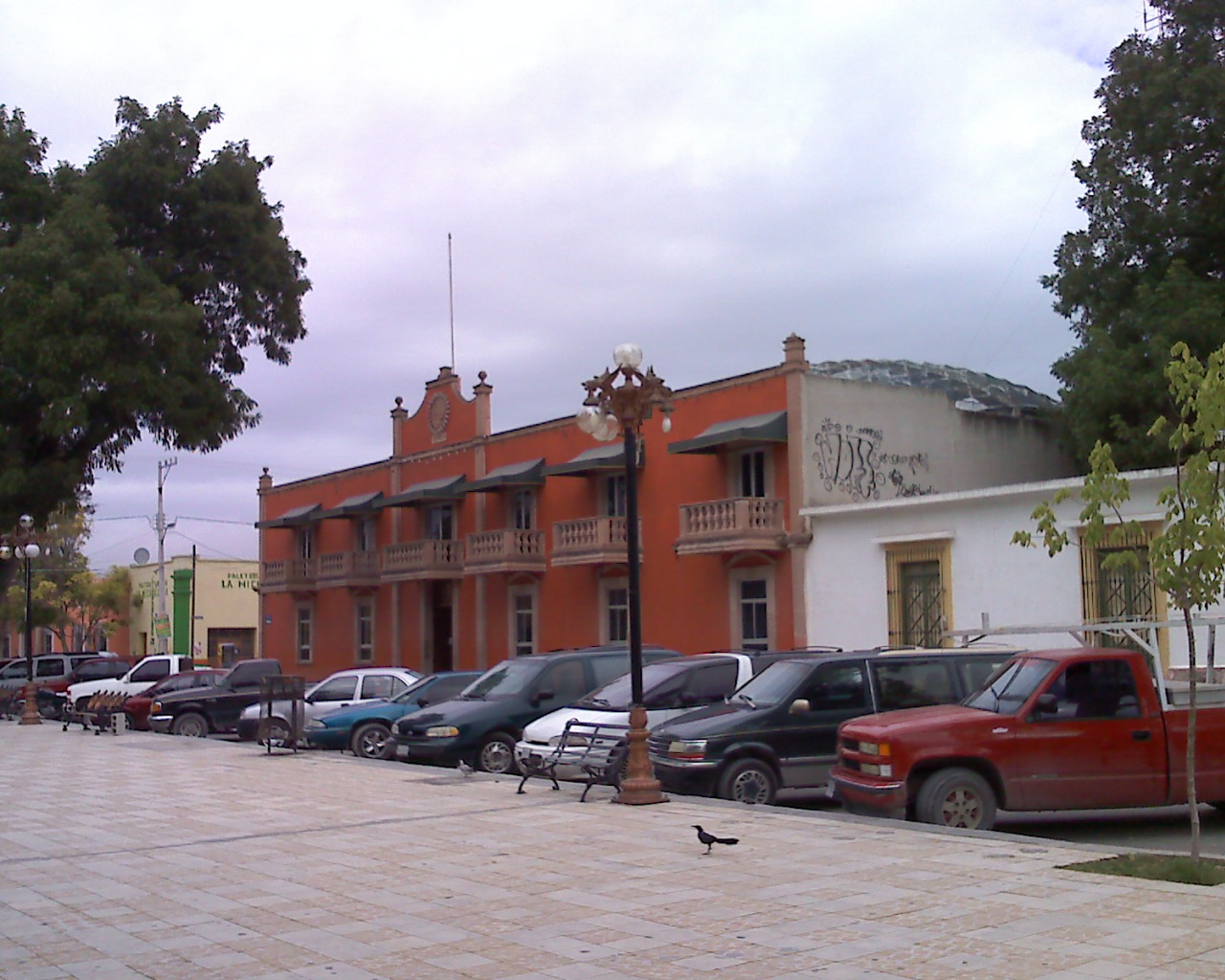
- Town hall

- Location in Mexico Cedral (Mexico)
- Coordinates: 23°49′13″N 100°43′25″W
- Country: Mexico
- State: San Luis Potosí

Area
  - Total: 1,169 km^{2} (451 sq mi)
- Elevation: 1,853 m (6,079 ft)

Population (2020)
  - Total: 19,840
  - Density: 16.97/km^{2} (43.96/sq mi)
- Time zone: UTC-6 (Zona Centro)
- Postal code: 78520

Cedral is a town and municipality in the central Mexican state of San Luis Potosí. As of the year 2020, it has a total population of 19,840.

== Geography ==
Cedral is located on the northern part of San Luis Potosí, along the Mexican Federal Highway 62. It borders Doctor Arroyo in the east, Matehuala and Villa de La Paz in the south, as well as Catorce and Vanegas in the west. Its average elevation is 1,853 meters above sea level.

=== Climate ===
Cedral has a cold semi-arid climate (BSk). It sees the least rainfall in December, with an average precipitation of 13 mm; and the most rainfall in September, with an average precipitation of 76 mm.

Climate data for Cedral
Month	Jan	Feb	Mar	Apr	May	Jun	Jul	Aug	Sep	Oct	Nov	Dec	Year
Mean daily maximum °C (°F)	20.1 (68.2)	23 (73)	25.6 (78.1)	28.2 (82.8)	28.8 (83.8)	27.8 (82.0)	27 (81)	27.7 (81.9)	25.3 (77.5)	24.6 (76.3)	22 (72)	20.5 (68.9)	25.1 (77.1)
Daily mean °C (°F)	12.4 (54.3)	14.7 (58.5)	17.2 (63.0)	20 (68)	21.3 (70.3)	21.4 (70.5)	20.7 (69.3)	21.2 (70.2)	19.7 (67.5)	18.2 (64.8)	15 (59)	13 (55)	17.9 (64.2)
Mean daily minimum °C (°F)	6.7 (44.1)	8.3 (46.9)	10.4 (50.7)	12.9 (55.2)	15.2 (59.4)	16 (61)	15.5 (59.9)	15.9 (60.6)	15.4 (59.7)	13.3 (55.9)	9.8 (49.6)	7.4 (45.3)	12.2 (54.0)
Average rainfall mm (inches)	17 (0.7)	15 (0.6)	18 (0.7)	31 (1.2)	55 (2.2)	54 (2.1)	56 (2.2)	48 (1.9)	76 (3.0)	40 (1.6)	15 (0.6)	13 (0.5)	438 (17.3)
Source: Climate-Data.org
