= Villa de Ramos =

Municipality in San Luis Potosi, Mexico

Coordinates: 22°50′N 101°55′W

- Municipality

- Location in Mexico Villa de Ramos (Mexico)
- Country: Mexico
- State: San Luis Potosí

Population (2020)
  - Municipality: 38,389
- Demonym: (in Spanish)
- Time zone: UTC−6 (CST)

Villa de Ramos is a municipality in the Mexican state of San Luis Potosi.

== History ==
The foundation of Villa de Ramos is attributed to Fr. Jeronimo de Pangua. A rich mine was discovered around this place in the year 1608 and the population settled until 1610. In 1612, a church was built but later destroyed due to the discovery of a rich mine. A few years later, silver and other minerals extracted from this place were exhausting and exploration projects were halted. Gradually, the y indigenous people coming from the northern region.

During 1794, a few mines were being exploited on that place, the biggest was Don Juan de Dious Galindo's San Vicente. Days later, a fabulous discovery was made, one inhabitant of the place was digging on his kitchen, he gathered a certain amount of grains of native silver.

During Mexico's War of Independence, Villa de Ramos was again declining in terms of population. El Real de Ramos, as it was called at that time, lay on ruins and vandalism was very common, especially in the western part now bordering the state of Zacatecas.

In 1815, realist commanders Manuel Tover and Rafael Chavez along with Zacatecas and San Luis Potosi, commanded by Cura Capitan Jose, persecuted insurgent Victor Rosales. On this persecution 3 realist leaders arrived to El Barril, northeast of Villa de Ramos, were deceived by insurgent Rosales.

During the Revolution, a few military actions were registered on haciendas from the region. An interesting fact for numismatists is that irregular coins were emitted in the municipality in the 19th century. They were used mainly for trading in the place. One of these coins were made of coppers and was circular shaped. And was sealed only by a face with Ramos written on it, they were called cuartillas.

== Geography ==
The municipality is located to the northwest in the state of San Luis, in the altiplano region. The municipal head or capital, has the following coordinates: 101*55' West longitude and 22*50' North latitude, with an elevation of 2,200 meters above sea level. Villa de Ramos is bordered by Santo Domingo to the North, Salinas de Hidalgoto the Southeast and the State of Zacatecas to the South and West. Distance from the municipality to state's capital is 81 mi (130 km).

=== Climate ===
Climates that predominate in the municipality are: to the orient, template and to the west, semi arid template. Precipitation is 429.6 millimeters with a rain period from June to September that represents 71.58% of the annual precipitation. The mid temperature annually is 17.*C, the maximum is 30.45*C in the month of July. And the minimum is 7*C in the month of January.

=== Flora and fauna ===
The type of predominant flora in the municipality is: matorral microfilo, desertico, espinoso, izotal, pastizal, nopalera, cardonal associated with the following species: gobernadora, mezquite, huizache, hojasen, castela, corolaria, nopales, leucotricha y robusta, palma china, palma loca, cardones, garambullos, and a variety of grass like: navajita, banderilla, borreguero and salada.

Fauna includes Bobcat, Rodents, spiders and snakes.

== Demography ==
According to the XII Censo General de Poblacion y Vivienda 2000 effectuated directed by Instituto Nacional de Estadistica Geografia e Informatica (INEGI), the total Indian population in the municipality is up to 74 people. Their language is nahuatl and Chontal from Oaxaca. According to the results of the II Conteo de Poblacion y Vivienda 2005, in the municipality live 96 people that speak and indigenous language.

=== Demographic Evaluation ===
According to the XII Censo General de Poblacion y Vivienda 2000 led by INEGI, the total population is 34,432 inhabitants, from which 16,776 are men and 17,656 are women. The total population represents 1.50% of the state's total population. Population density is 16.04 inhabitants per km^{2}.

=== Population ===
Year	Men	Women	Total
1990	14,008	14,668	28,676
1995	16,303	16,181	32,484
2000	16,776	17,656	34,432

In the year 2000 and 1990 the difference is 2,768 men and 2,988 women. So the absolute growth in that decade is 5,756.

Year	Population	Growth Rate
1950	13,517	
1960	17,132	2.36
1970	17,510	0.22
1980	24,231	3.22
1980	24,231	3.22
1990	28,676	1.68
1995	32,484	2.49
2000	34,432	1.17

Source: CONAPO: The population of Mexico's population 1950–1990, 1994
INAFED, Sistema Nacional de Information Municipal, Mexico, 2002

According to results presented by the II Conteo de Poblacion y Vivienda 2005, the municipality's population is 34,516.

=== Religion ===
In the year 2000, the population aging 5 years and up is Catholic ascending to 27,852 inhabitants, meanwhile non-Catholics in the same age range is 1,919 people.

== Infrastructure ==
=== Education ===
The municipality has basic education services (pre-school, elementary and secondary) and one bachelor.

It has an infrastructure of:

- 33 kindergartens, in rural and urban areas.
- 59 elementary schools in rural and urban areas.
- 25 secondary schools in rural and urban areas.

There are 17,244 analphabetics from ages 15 years and more against 2,912 analphabetics that represent 14.44% of analphabetism.

=== Health care ===
The demand of health services from the municipality, is met by official and private organisms in rural and urban areas. Villa de Ramos has a total of 10 medical units.

S.S.A.	I.M.S.S	I.S.S.S.T.E	I.M.S.S.	Oportunidades Brigada Médica Móvil
4			6	1

=== Supply ===
There is one storage warehouse from Boruconsa.

== Communication ==
=== Radio ===
There are no radio stations within Villa de Ramos, however some radio stations cover the municipality.

- XEWA – AM
- XECZ – AM
- XESL

=== Television ===
There are no local TV stations in Villa de Ramos but some national and regional signals cover Villa de Ramos

- Canal 13 – transmitted from Zacatecas and is owned by Televisa.
- Canal 3 and 5 transmitted nationally by Televisa.
- And Azteca 13 from TV Azteca, transmitted nationally.

=== Post offices ===
Villa de Ramos has 0 postal offices.

=== Telephone lines ===
Villa de Ramos landline phones are owned by Telmex.

== Transportation ==
The municipality has approximately 227.2 Kilometers (141.17 miles) of roads. 4.5 km are federal paved roads and the rest:

	Paved	Unpaved	Dirt Road
State Funded	72.2 km		
Rural roads			150.5 km

== Economy ==
=== Agriculture ===
Agriculture is the main economic activity in Villa de Ramos. Main crops include maize, beans, dried peppers and cebada. These crops are commercialized throughout the municipality and bordering municipalities.

=== Livestock ===
Cows, goats, pigs and sheep are raised throughout Villa de Ramos. They are mainly raised for milk, meat and wool.

=== Manufacturing ===
A few manufacturing factories employ a small number of people from the municipality.

=== Commerce ===
Commercial activity is one of the main economic activities in Villa de Ramos. Puestos or small shops through large shops are all important factors of the commercial activity in the municipio.

=== Services ===
Demand for services in the municipality creates jobs and meets personal and professional needs in the municipio.

== Tourism ==
=== Attractions ===
Templo Parroquial is an historic church in the municipality. Some decades ago a bell made out of gold was stolen from the temple. The cost of the bell is estimated to be in the hundreds or thousands of dollars because it was made of gold.

Casa del Conde is another local attraction.

=== Festivals ===
In Villa de Ramos' municipal head, which is Villa de Ramos, San Juan Nepomuceno is celebrated on May 16. A fair is organized during that week and music and dancing are also part of the festivities.

=== Local foods ===
The most popular dish in the municipality is enchiladas en tortilla roja or red tortilla. Also popular are milk candies and Queso de Tuna (prickly pear cheese).

=== Tourism centers ===
- La Hedionda, a small town which literally means "the stinky" in English. Large bones have been found here, and around Cienega, another small town, small artifacts have also been found.
- Yoliat is a town where each year hundreds of Huicholes gather to celebrate, in a symbolic way, the spirits of their ancestors. Baustism is also practiced by Huicholes in a small pond, which they believe is sacred.
- Los Hernandez, San Rafael, and Salitral de Carrera are towns where large archaeological finds have taken place.
- La Mina
- El Calvario
- El Barril
- Pozo Blanco
