= Nuestra Belleza San Luis Potosí 2011 =

- Date: July 15, 2011
- Venue: Teatro “Benito Juárez”, Cedral, San Luis Potosí
- Broadcaster: Televisa
- Entrants: 8
- Placements: 4
- Winner: Lorena Alvarado; San Luis Potosí

Nuestra Belleza San Luis Potosí 2011, was held at the Teatro “Benito Juárez” in Cedral, San Luis Potosí on July 15, 2011. At the conclusion of the final night of competition Lorena Alvarado of San Luis Potosí City was crowned the winner. Alvarado was crowned by outgoing Nuestra Belleza San Luis Potosí titleholder Carmen Hernández. Eight contestants competed for the title.

== Results ==
=== Placements ===
Final results	Contestant
Nuestra Belleza San Luis Potosí 2011	Lorena Alvarado
Suplente / 1st Runner-up	Iris Guerrero
Finalists	Rebeca Palacios Quiroga; Tania Morales Arreguín

== Contestants ==
Contestants
Lorena Alvarado Zermeño
Chantal Eugenia Araiza Mosqueda
Ariadna Jazmín Jiménez Trejo
Rebeca Palacios Quiroga
Andrea Elizabeth Basurto Cruz
Iris Yesenia Guerreo Izaguirre
Thania Morales Arreguín
Ana Cecilia Cortés Chávez
