= San Nicolás Tolentino =

- Municipality and town
- Location of the municipality in San Luis Potosí

- Location in Mexico
- Coordinates: 22°14′56″N 100°33′09″W
- Country: Mexico
- State: San Luis Potosí
- Established: 1827

Area
  - Total: 689.36 km^{2} (266.16 sq mi)
- Elevation: 1,460 m (4,790 ft)

Population (2009)
  - Total: 5,547
- Time zone: UTC-6 (Zona Centro)

San Nicolás Tolentino is a municipality and town located in the central Mexican state of San Luis Potosí. The municipality was founded in 1614, and consists of many small towns and villages. Santa Catarina is the largest town in the municipality. In 1827, the Municipal Presidency was established in the town.

== Geography ==
The municipality of San Nicolás Tolentino is located in the "Middle Zone" (Zona Media) of the state of San Luis Potosí, in the Sierra Madre Oriental. The land consists of high plains and mountains.

It is bordered to the northwest by the municipality of Armadillo de los Infante; to the north by the municipality of Cerritos; to the northeast by the municipality of Villa Juárez; to the east by the municipality of Rioverde; to the southeast by the municipality of Ciudad Fernández; and to the southwest by the municipality of Zaragoza.

=== Settlements ===
Settlements in the municipality, in addition to the town of San Nicolás Tolentino, include: Santa Catarina, Ocampo, Ignacio Allende, La laguna, Potrero de santa gertrudis, Las Golondrinas, El Carrizal de Guadalupe, Los Nogales, Cañas, Jaguey de san francisco, La presa, Ojo de Agua, San Jose de Nogalitos, Agua Zarca, San Martin de Abajo, San Martin de Arriba, Los Morenos, Barranca de san Joaquin, El pinal, la Ballita, San Pito Pato Tercero de Florencia

=== Geology ===
The surface rocks consist mainly of Cretaceous sedimentary limestones, conglomerates, and sandy- limey- shales. There is some interbedded gypsum. These Cretaceous rocks are overlain in places by Neogene and Quaternary alluvial sediments with some volcanics. There is a mercury mine in the municipality.

== Demographics ==
There are fifty-five settlements in the municipality. As of 2009, the population was 5,547.

== Economy ==
Agriculture makes up most of San Nicolás Tolentino's economy.

== Tourist places ==
presa las golondrinas Las Golondrinas Dam, which is also located in the municipality of San Nicolas Tolentino. Getting there takes two hours from the state capital and an hour and a half from the city of Rioverde, since it is located on federal highway 70, at the junction with the communities called El Cañón, belonging to Ciudad Fernández, on a road that connects that municipality with San Nicolás Tolentino, Villa Juárez, Cerritos and that even connects with federal highway 57 on an adventure route as the slogan dictates. Hiking is one of the activities that, in addition to promoting health, offers low-cost adventures and provides satisfaction for any traveler who wants to get to know San Luis Potosí.

An example of these adventures is the Las Golondrinas dam in the municipality of San Nicolás Tolentino, a body of water that is known for its contrast of colors and its wealth of fauna, ideal for country tourism.

The founding of the town of San Nicolás Tolentino was around the year 1600 by Chichimeca Indians and its first historical record is from 1673 when the creation of its church is attested.

The Las Golondrinas dam was born in the 1970s and was inaugurated by the then President of the Republic, José López Portillo, at that time responding to the need to improve agriculture and water collection.

In the first instance, it gave a lot of work to dozens of residents of nearby communities such as Laguna de Santo Domingo, Ocampo, El Sermón, who took five years to build the 120-meter depth -one of the deepest in the state-, which is why which despite the droughts, is never without water.

The dam was originally built at Ranchito El Muerto, but the settlers were soon absorbed by the larger nearby communities such as Laguna de Santo Domingo and Las Golondrinas, the name the site eventually took.

== Municipal Presidents ==
- Doroteo Gómez Maldonado - 1949-1952
- Onesimo Saldaña Ipiña - 1952-1955
- José Crecencio Cárdenas Hernández - 1955-1958
- Sulpicio Alvarez Torres - 1958 - 1961
- Bernardo Esquivel Hernández - 1961 - 1964
- Alejendrino Ruiz Ruiz - 1964 - 1967
- José Crecencio Cárdenas Hernández - 1967 - 1970
- Teófilo Flores Torres - 1970 - 1973
- Antonio Vázquez Ruiz y Abdon Nieto Torres - 1973 - 1976
- José Gustavo Ruiz Pesina - 1976 - 1979
- Apolonio Leal Ruiz - 1979 - 1982
- José Gustavo Ruiz Pesina - 1982 - 1985
- Luis Juárez Rosas - 1985 - 1988
- Arnulfo Alvarez Rodríguez - 1988 - 1991
- Sulpicio Arriaga Hernández - 1991 - 1994
- Petra Martínez Avalos - 1994 - 1997
- José Castillo Sifuentes - 1997 - 2000
- Abelardo Saldaña Vargas - 2000 - 2003
- José Asunción Pérez Nava - 2003 - 2006
- Antonio González Maya - 2006 - 2009
- Pedro Infante Rodríguez - 2009 - 2012
- Olga Ruiz Vazquez - 2012 - 2015
- Pedro Infante Rodriguez - 2015 - 2018
- Pedro Infante Rodriguez - 2018 - 2021
- Arturo Elias Rodriguez - 2021 - 2024
