= San Vicente Tancuayalab =

- Municipality and town
- Interactive map of San Vicente Tancuayalab
- Coordinates: 21°43′05″N 98°35′17″W
- Country: Mexico
- State: San Luis Potosí
- Time zone: UTC-6 (Zona Centro)

San Vicente Tancuayalab is a town and municipality in the central Mexican state of San Luis Potosí.

== Toponymy ==
The name Tancuayalab comes from the Huastec language and means "place of the staff of command"; by extension, it may refer to the site of a ceremonial center or the residence of a high priest.
