= Tanquián de Escobedo =

Coordinates: 21°36′N 98°40′W

- Municipality and town
- Interactive map of Tanquián de Escobedo
- Country: Mexico
- State: San Luis Potosí
- Time zone: UTC-6 (Zona Centro)

Tanquián de Escobedo is a town and municipality in the central Mexican state of San Luis Potosí.

== Demographics ==
Tanquián de Ecosbedo's population has a population of 14,382, 83% of which are Catholic. 25% of the population is indigenous or is of indigenous descent. Its most populous town of the same name has a population of 9458 according to the 2020 INEGI census.

Tanquian en San Luis Potosí
