= Guaxcama =

Coordinates: 22°12′N 100°17′W

Guaxcama, also spelled Guaxcaman or Huaxcama, is a village located in the municipality of Villa Juárez, San Luis Potosí, in central Mexico. It was a sulfur mining location.

In 1808 mining for sulfur began in the area and on November 18, 1972, an explosion occurred in one of the mines. There were no deaths. The mines were abandoned.

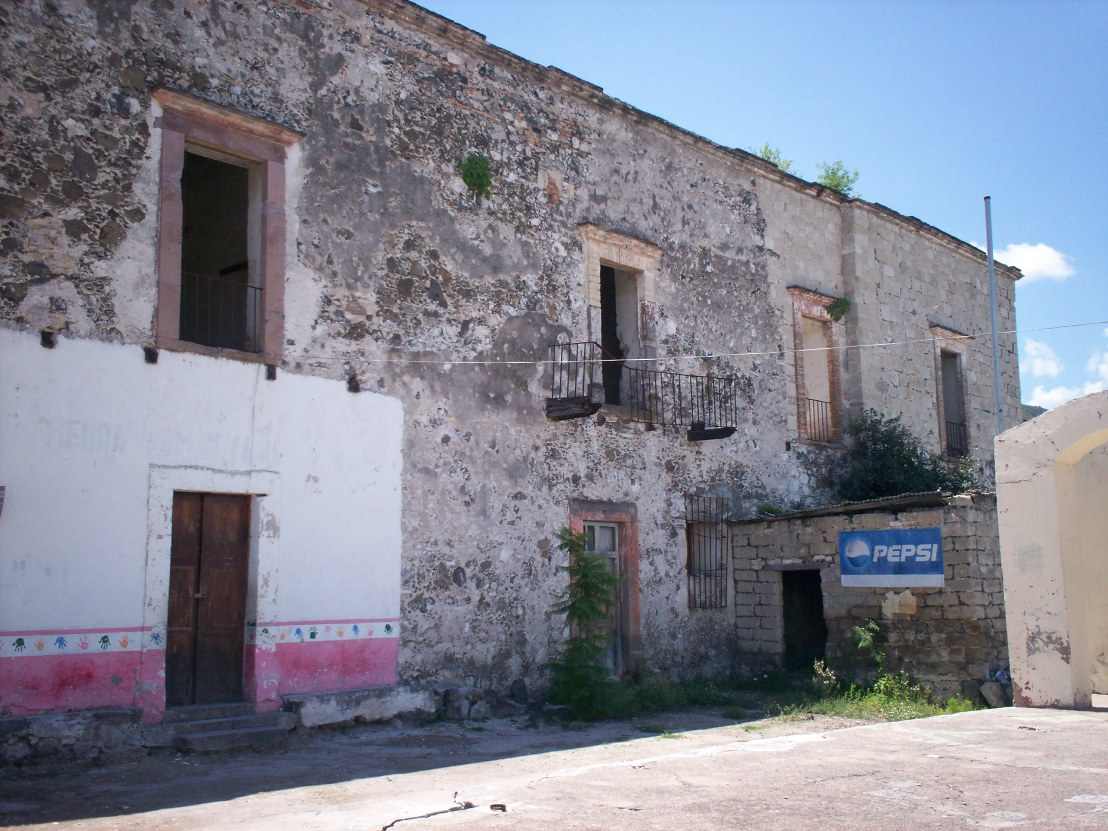
Hacienda of Guaxcama

Guaxcama Sulfur Mine

== Bibliography ==
Roque, Alexandro (2004) Villa Juárez, La bella villa, CNCA/Secretaría de Cultura de SLP/ Ayuntamiento de Villa Juárez
