= Santo Domingo, San Luis Potosí =

Santo Domingo
- Municipality and town
- Location in Mexico
- Coordinates: 23°19′29.43″N 101°44′10.54″W
- Country: Mexico
- State: San Luis Potosí

Government
  - Presidente Municipal: Fili Rodriguez
- Time zone: UTC-6 (Zona Centro)

Santo Domingo is a town and municipality in the central Mexican state of San Luis Potosí.
