= Mexican Federal Highway 68 =

Highway in Mexico

Federal Highway 68
- Carretera federal 68

Route information
- Maintained by Secretariat of Communications and Transportation
- Length: 36 km (22 mi)

Major junctions
- East end: Fed. 15 near Acaponeta
- Fed. 15D in Tecuala
- West end: Playa Novillero

Location
- Country: Mexico
- State: Nayarit

Highway system
- Mexican Federal Highways; List; Autopistas
← Fed. 66	→ Fed. 69

Federal Highway 68 (Carretera Federal 68) (Fed. 68) is a toll-free part of the federal highway corridors (los corredores carreteros federales) of Mexico. The highway connects Playa Novillero, Nayarit in the west near the Pacific Ocean to Fed. 15.
