= Villa de Arista =

- Municipality and town
- Interactive map of Villa de Arista
- Coordinates: 22°38′40″N 100°50′55″W
- Country: Mexico
- State: San Luis Potosí
- Time zone: UTC-6 (Zona Centro)

Villa de Arista is a town and municipality in the central Mexican state of San Luis Potosí.
