= Tampacán =

Coordinates: 21°25′N 98°44′W

- Municipality and town
- Interactive map of Tampacán
- Country: Mexico
- State: San Luis Potosí
- Time zone: UTC-6 (Zona Centro)

Tampacán is a town and municipality in the central Mexican state of San Luis Potosí.
