= Villa de Pozos =

- Municipality
- Location of Villa de Pozos Villa de Pozos (Mexico)
- Coordinates: 22°05′47″N 100°52′34″W
- Country: Mexico
- State: San Luis Potosí
- Incorporated: 22 July 2024
- Seat: Villa de Pozos

Government
  - President: María Teresa de Jesús Rivera Acevedo

Area
  - Total: 147.79 km^{2} (57.06 sq mi)
- Elevation: 1,870 m (6,140 ft)

Population (2020 Census)
  - Total: 148,165
  - Density: 1,002.5/km^{2} (2,596.6/sq mi)
- Time zone: UTC-6 (Central)
- Postal codes: 78394, 78420–78421, 78423–78424
- Area code: 444

Villa de Pozos is a municipality in the Mexican state of San Luis Potosí. It is located about 10 kilometres (6.2 mi) southeast of the state capital of San Luis Potosí. After being absorbed by the municipality of San Luis Potosí in 1946, it was reestablished as an independent municipality in 2024.

== Geography ==
Villa de Pozos borders the municipalities of San Luis Potosí to the southwest, Soledad de Graciano Sánchez to the northwest, Cerro de San Pedro to the north, and Zaragoza to the east. Located on the Mexican Plateau at an elevation of around 1,800 to 2,000 metres (5,900 to 6,600 ft), Villa de Pozos has a semi-arid climate, receiving 300 to 400 millimetres (12 to 16 in) of rain per year.

== History ==
In 1592, the hacienda of Real de San Francisco de los Pozos was founded by Diego de Tapia, son of Fernando de Tapia, to supply the miners at Cerro de San Pedro with food and other necessities. After Mexico became independent, Pozos was one of the original municipalities established by the state of San Luis Potosí on 19 July 1826. It was elevated to town (villa) status on 26 April 1830. It remained an independent municipality until 10 October 1946, when it was integrated into the municipality of San Luis Potosí as a borough (delegación). It has been alleged that Gonzalo N. Santos, the PRI governor of San Luis Potosí at the time, took this action because Pozos was a centre of Synarchist activity.

In 1995, the citizens of Villa de Pozos petitioned the state of San Luis Potosí for the reestablishment of the municipality, which the state approved in 2022. However, in 2004, the Supreme Court of Justice of the Nation struck down the act reestablishing the municipality on technical grounds. Another request was submitted in 2022, and on 22 July 2024, the San Luis Potosí state congress approved the reestablishment of Villa de Pozos as a municipality.

== Administration ==
Villa de Pozos will hold its first elections as an independent municipality in 2027. An interim administration led by María Teresa de Jesús Rivera Acevedo was appointed by the state in August 2024. The municipal government of Villa de Pozos consists of a municipal president, two councillors (Spanish: síndicos), and twelve trustees (regidores), the councillors and one of the trustees being elected by relative majority, and the other trustees by proportional representation.

== Demographics ==
In the 2020 INEGI census, the borough (delegacíon) of Villa de Pozos in San Luis Potosí recorded a population of 148,165 inhabitants. The neighbourhoods of Laguna de Santa Rita and San Nicolás de los Jassos recorded populations of 13,315 and 2,885 respectively in 2020. In 2002 the population of the borough was estimated at approximately 61,000.

== Economy ==
The main economic activities in Villa de Pozos are cattle farming, manufacturing and commerce.
