= Mexquitic de Carmona =

- Municipality and town
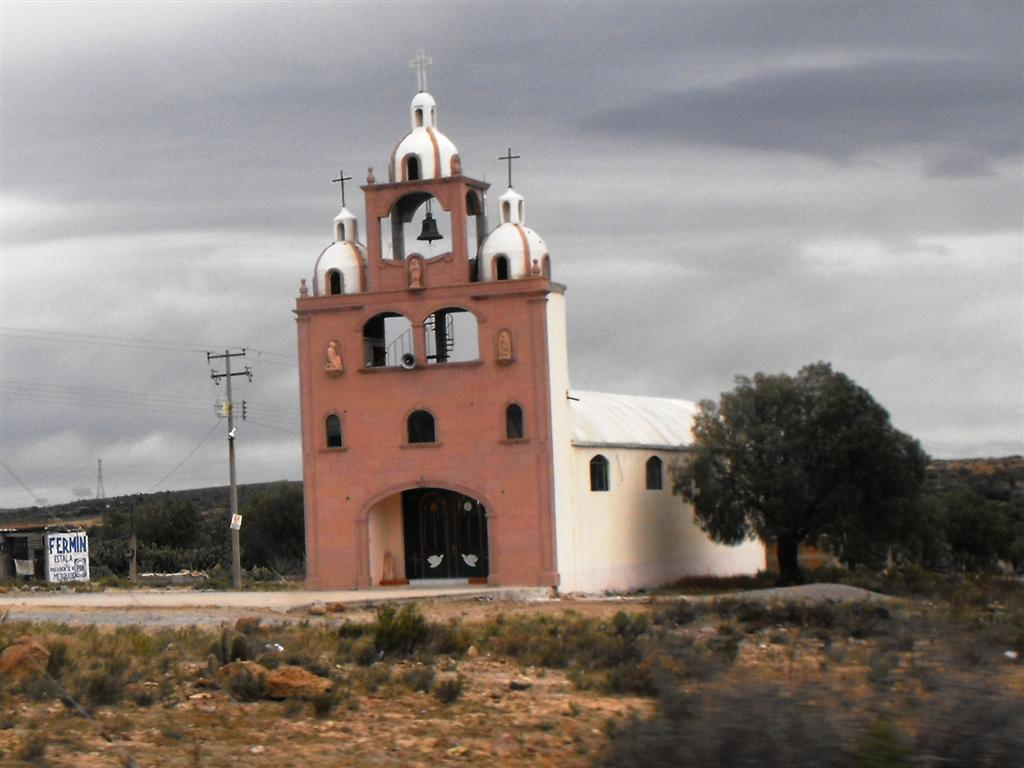
- Church in Mexquitic

- Location within San Luis Potosí Location within Mexico
- Coordinates: 22°16′N 101°07′W
- Country: Mexico
- State: San Luis Potosí

Population (2020)
  - Total: 58,469
- (municipality)
- Time zone: UTC-6 (Zona Centro)
- Website: mexquiticdecarmona-slp.gob.mx

Mexquitic de Carmona is a town and municipality in the central Mexican state of San Luis Potosí. In the 2020 Census, the municipality reported a population of 58,469, up 9.41% from the 2010 figure.
