= Moctezuma, San Luis Potosí =

- Municipality and town
- Interactive map of Moctezuma, San Luis Potosí
- Coordinates: 22°44′51″N 101°04′59″W
- Country: Mexico
- State: San Luis Potosí
- Time zone: UTC-6 (Zona Centro)

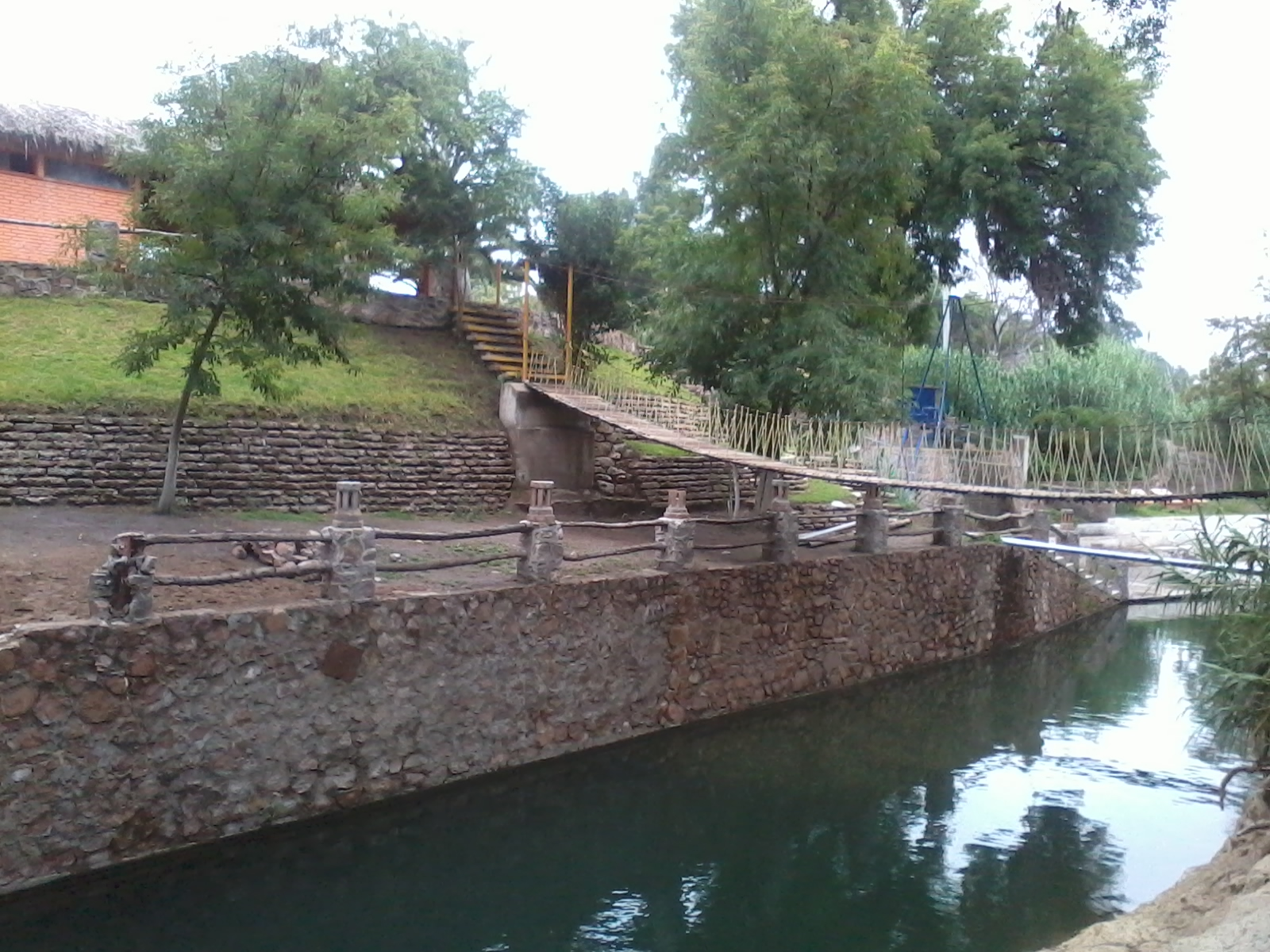
Moctezuma, San Luis Potosí

Moctezuma, San Luis Potosí is a town and municipality in the central Mexican state of San Luis Potosí.
