= Primo Feliciano Velázquez =

Primo Feliciano Velázquez Rodríguez
- Born: June 6, 1860; Santa María del Río, San Luis Potosí, Mexico
- Died: June 19, 1953 (aged 93)
- Education: Seminary of San Luis Potosí
- Occupations: Journalist, attorney, historian
- Organizations: Academia Mexicana de la Historia, Real Academia Española, Sociedad Mexicana de Geografía y Estadística
- Notable work: Historia de San Luis Potosí

Primo Feliciano Velázquez Rodríguez (6 June 1860 – 19 June 1953) was a Mexican journalist, attorney and historian who specialized in regional history. He was a translator of Nahuatl and Latin and a connoisseur of local literature. In 1946-1948, he published the definitive Historia de San Luis Potosí (History of San Luis Potosi) in four volumes.

Velázquez was born in Santa Maria del Rio, San Luis Potosi to Octaviano Velázquez and María de la Concepción Rodríguez. He was twelve years old when he was enrolled at the Seminary of San Luis Potosi (Seminario Conciliar Guadalupano Josefino), and he graduated in 1878, took an advanced degree in 1879, and passed his law examination there in October 1880. Subsequently, he assumed the Latin chair and the Civil Law chair there.

In 1883, he published La Voz de San Luis (The Voice of San Luis), a series of broadsides to celebrate the centennial of the birth of Agustín de Iturbide. The next year, he joined with Ambrosio Ramirez and Juan N. Ruelas to found the newspaper El Estandarte (The Standard) in San Luis Potosi which proceeded to publish articles critical of the government, as well as literary and historical articles, written mostly by Velázquez. Velázquez espoused Christian social doctrine in his editorials, and encouraged others to submit articles on local history and folklore. El Estandarte was very successful going from biweekly to daily in 1890 and continuing to be published until the end of 1911.

Velázquez made his home a gathering point for those interested in the history of San Luis Potosi, and impromptu seminars were regular occurrences. He was a pioneer in archaeological research in San Luis Potosi, not only excavating himself, but encouraging the work of others.

Velázquez belonged to a number of organizations, local, national, and international, among them were: Academia Mexicana de la Historia, Real Academia de la Lengua, and Sociedad Mexicana de Geografía y Estadística.

== Selected works ==
- 1945 Códice Chimalpopoca: Anales de Cuauhtitlán y leyenda de los soles translated direct from the Nahuatl by Primo Feliciano Velázquez, Universidad Nacional Autónoma de México, Imprenta Universitaria, Mexico City, OCLC 1885732
- 1946/1948 Historia de San Luis Potosí Sociedad Mexicana de Geografía y Estadística, Mexico City, OCLC 1908497
- "D. Joaquín Garcia Icazbalceta" Memorias de la Academia Mexicana de la Historia: Correspondiente de la Real de Madrid, II, pp. 101–157
