= Venado, San Luis Potosí =

Coordinates: 22.9333°N 101.093°W

Venado
- Municipality and town
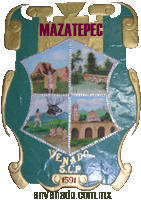
- Coat of arms
- Interactive map of Venado
- Country: Mexico
- State: San Luis Potosí

Population (2020)
  - Total: 14,188
- Time zone: UTC-6 (Zona Centro)

Venado is a town and municipality in the central Mexican state of San Luis Potosí. The name in Spanish means deer.
