= Tampamolón Corona =

Coordinates: 21°34′N 98°49′W

San antonio
- Municipality and town
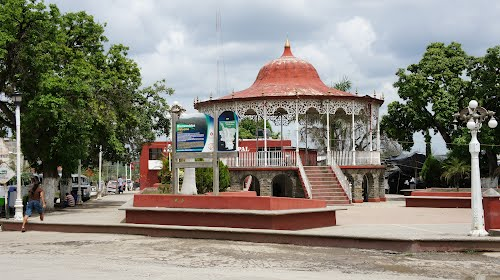

- Location in Mexico San antonio (Mexico)
- Country: Mexico
- State: San Luis Potosí

Area
  - Total: 257.58 km^{2} (99.45 sq mi)

Population (2005)
  - Total: 13 760
- Time zone: UTC-6 (Zona Centro)

Tampamolón Corona is a town and municipality in the central Mexican state of San Luis Potosí.
