= Rayón, San Luis Potosí =

Coordinates: 21°51′N 99°39′W

- Municipality and town
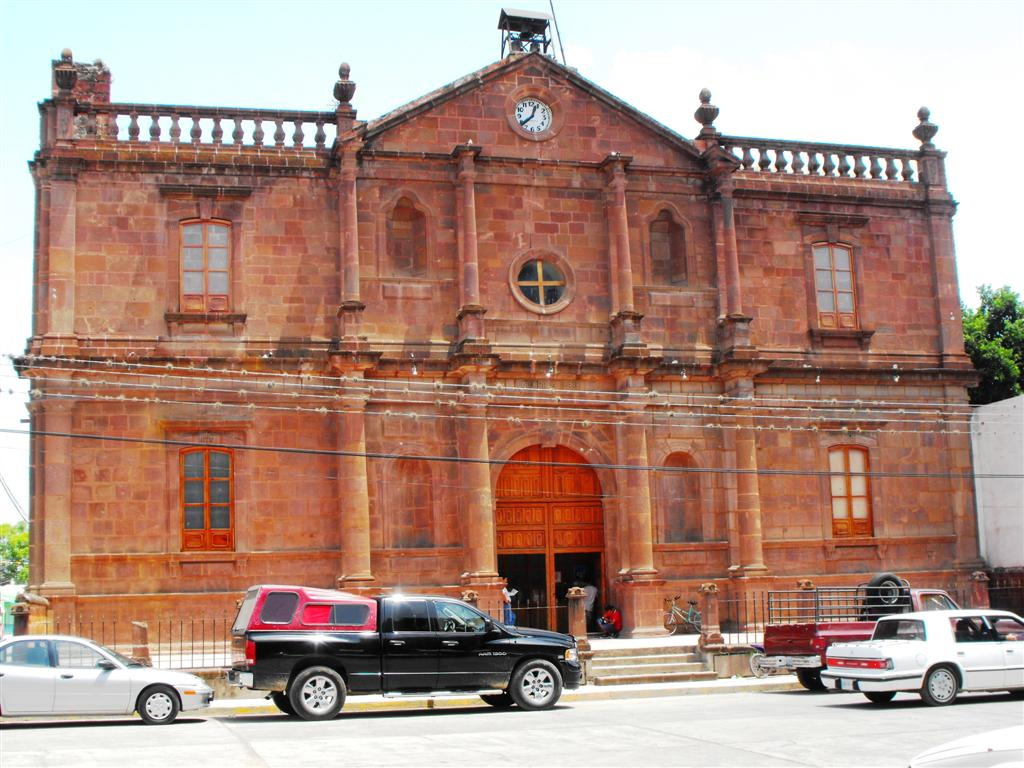
- Templo del Refugio

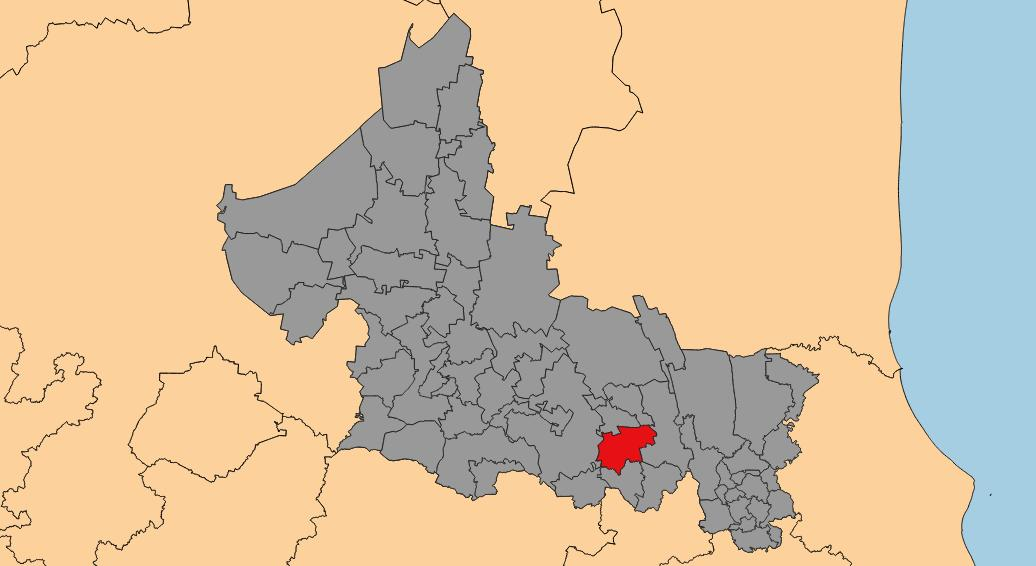
- Location of the municipality in San Luis Potosí

- Location in Mexico
- Country: Mexico
- State: San Luis Potosí

Population (2020)
  - Total: 6,240
- Time zone: UTC-6 (Zona Centro)

Rayón is a town and municipality in the central Mexican state of San Luis Potosí.

== History ==
Spanish settlement in the area that became the municipality began in 1617 with the founding of a Franciscan mission by Fr. Juan Bautista Mollinedo and Fr. Juan de Cárdenas, The mission was called "San Felipe de los Gamotes". The mission was abandoned as the local Indians died out or fled to the mountains.

On 8 October 1827 the town of Nuevo Gamotes was formally established.

== Settlements ==
- Aguacatillos
- Amoladeras
- Arvizu
- Bartolo Bueno
- Basilio Martínez
- Benito Ibarra
- Boca de la Cañada
- Cerrito de Catarina
- Cerrito de la Cruz
- Colonia Paso Prieto
- Crucero de Rayón
- El Aguacate
- El Epazote
- El Huizachal
- El Mirador
- El Nogalito
- El Obispito
- El Pajarito
- El Piruche
- El Ranchito
- El Sabinito
- El Sótano
- El Tigre
- El Timbal
- Emilio Azúa
- Espirio González
- Morelos
