= Vanegas =

Coordinates: 23°53′N 100°57′W

- Municipality and town
- Interactive map of Vanegas
- Country: Mexico
- State: San Luis Potosí
- Time zone: UTC-6 (Zona Centro)

Vanegas is a town and municipality in the central Mexican state of San Luis Potosí.
