= El Naranjo, San Luis Potosí =

El Naranjo
- Municipality and town
- Location within San Luis Potosí Location within Mexico
- Coordinates: 22°31′19″N 99°19′31″W
- Country: Mexico
- State: San Luis Potosí
- Time zone: UTC-6 (Zona Centro)

El Naranjo is a town and a municipality in the central Mexican state of San Luis Potosí. The municipality, created in 1994, has an area of 834 square kilometres (322 sq mi) with a population of 20,495 in 2010, including the town of El Naranjo with a population of 10,562. The town is located at 22°31′19″N 99°19′31″W.

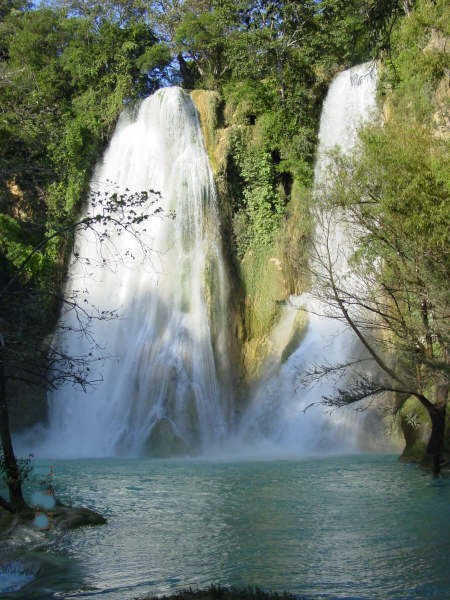
The Minas Viejas Cascade in El Naranjo.

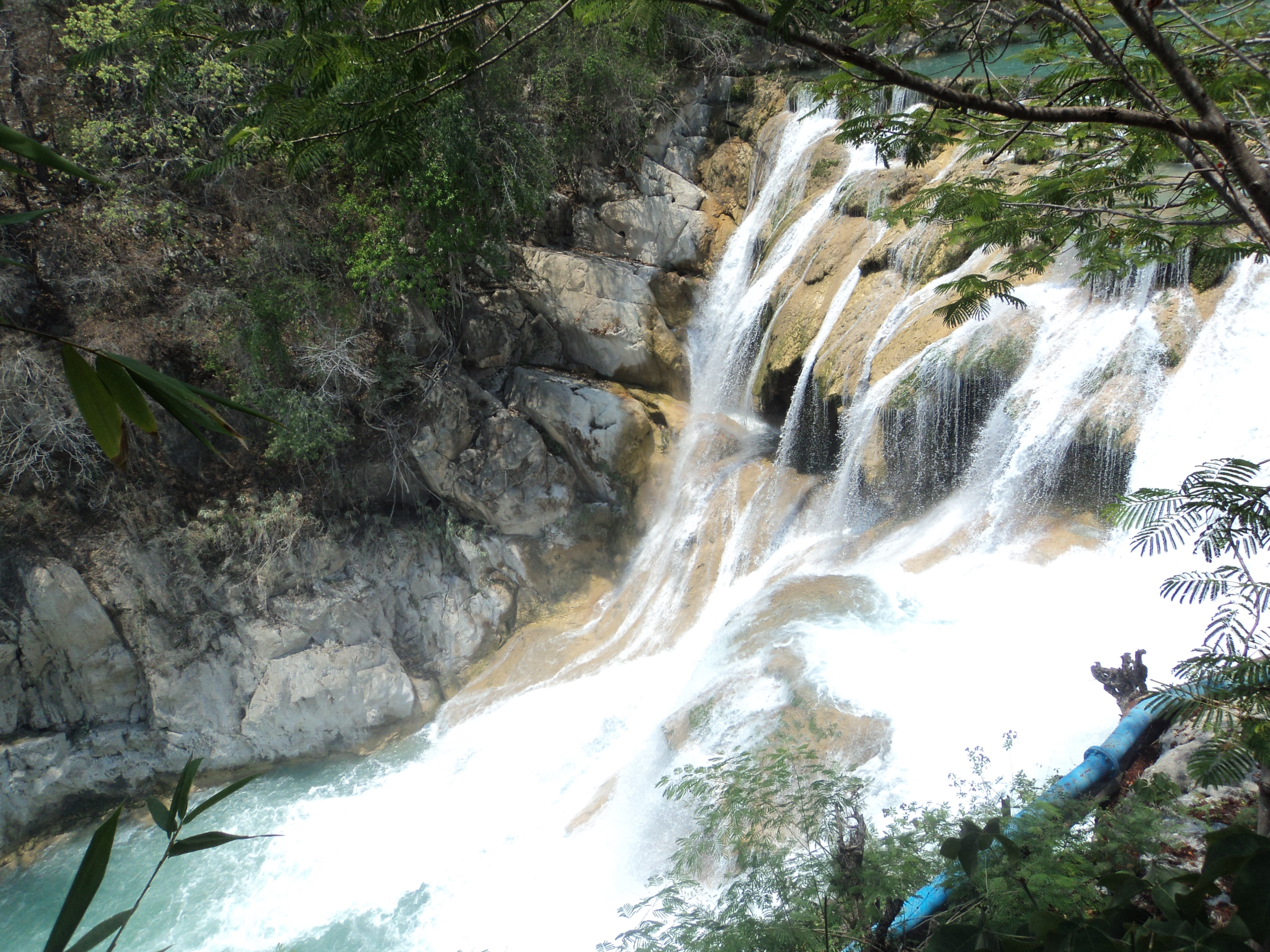
The El Meco Cascade, one of several waterfalls in El Naranjo municipality.

== Geography ==
El Naranjo is located in an extensive area of tropical and semi-tropical mountains and lowlands called La Huasteca after the Indian civilization and people inhabiting the region. The town of El Naranjo is in the foothills of the Sierra Madre Oriental. It received its name because previously an orchard of orange trees (naranjos) was located at the townsite. The municipality consists mostly of forested mountains with elevations of up to 5,000 feet (1,500 m) and valleys cultivated mostly in sugar cane. A large sugar refinery is located in the town of El Naranjo.

El Naranjo is noted for three large waterfalls. El Salto, six miles (9.7 km) north of the town of El Naranjo, is on the river of the same name. The waterfall is 70 metres (230 ft) high. A hydro-electric plant drains water from the river and the falls are often dry except during the rainy season in the summer. Below the falls, a canal returns water to the river and for three miles the El Salto River is a "wonderful Class IV blue water river." Several small, 10 to 25 feet (3.0 to 7.6 m) high waterfalls navigable by expert kayakers are in this section of the river. The 38 metres (125 ft) high El Meco cascade is at the end of the three-mile stretch of rapids below El Salto. A stairway leads to observation points and a hotel and restaurant are near the falls.

Below El Meco the El Salto River becomes less turbulent, running peacefully through a valley of sugar cane plantations near the town of El Naranjo. About nine miles (14 km) south of El Naranjo on a tributary of the El Salto River is the Cascada de Minas Viejas, with a 50 metres (160 ft) drop. Below the principal waterfall is a series of pools and smaller waterfalls dropping over travertine terraces. Minas Viejas is similar in appearance to Havasu Falls in the Grand Canyon of the United States, although the falls is surrounded by tropical, rather than desert, vegetation.

=== Climate ===
El Naranjo features a Dry Winter Humid subtropical climate (Cwa) according to (Köppen) or Cwal (Trewartha) climate. Nearby lowland locations nearby feature a tropical climate, but El Naranjo has enough elevation to have a cooler climate. The town has a pronounced wet season during the northern hemisphere summer with frequent thunderstorms. The winter has drier conditions.

Climate data for El Naranjo, San Luis Potosí (1981-2010 period). Elevation: 1,168 metres (3,832 ft)
Month	Jan	Feb	Mar	Apr	May	Jun	Jul	Aug	Sep	Oct	Nov	Dec	Year
Mean daily maximum °C (°F)	25.0 (77.0)	27.1 (80.8)	20.8 (69.4)	33.9 (93.0)	35.5 (95.9)	34.5 (94.1)	32.7 (90.9)	33.4 (92.1)	31.5 (88.7)	29.5 (85.1)	26.7 (80.1)	24.5 (76.1)	30.4 (86.7)
Daily mean °C (°F)	17.5 (63.5)	18.8 (65.8)	22.5 (72.5)	25.3 (77.5)	27.7 (81.9)	27.5 (81.5)	26.4 (79.5)	26.7 (80.1)	25.5 (77.9)	23.2 (73.8)	19.8 (67.6)	17.1 (62.8)	23.2 (73.8)
Mean daily minimum °C (°F)	10.0 (50.0)	10.6 (51.1)	14.2 (57.6)	16.8 (62.2)	19.8 (67.6)	20.6 (69.1)	20.1 (68.2)	20.0 (68.0)	19.6 (67.3)	17.0 (62.6)	12.8 (55.0)	9.8 (49.6)	15.9 (60.6)
Average precipitation mm (inches)	11.6 (0.46)	20.3 (0.80)	24.7 (0.97)	25.8 (1.02)	65.6 (2.58)	244.3 (9.62)	314.5 (12.38)	144.8 (5.70)	239.9 (9.44)	109.1 (4.30)	32.8 (1.29)	11.9 (0.47)	1,245.3 (49.03)
Source: Mexican Meteorological Service SMN.Conagua "SMN.Conagua". Retrieved on October 25, 2020.
