= Tanlajás =

Coordinates: 21°40′N 98°53′W

- Municipality and town
- Interactive map of Tanlajás
- Country: Mexico
- State: San Luis Potosí
- Time zone: UTC-6 (Zona Centro)

Tanlajás is a town and municipality in the central Mexican state of San Luis Potosí.
