= Charcas, San Luis Potosí =

Charcas
- Municipality and town

- Location in San Luis Potosí Location in Mexico
- Coordinates: 23°7′34″N 101°6′46″W
- Country: Mexico
- State: San Luis Potosí
- Elevation: 2,219 m (7,280 ft)

Population (2020)
  - Total: 14,117
  - Density: 2,874/km^{2} (7,440/sq mi)
- Time zone: UTC-6 (Zona Centro)

Charcas is a town and municipality in the Mexican state of San Luis Potosí. The municipality covers an area of 4.911 km^{2}. As of 2020, the municipality had a total population of 14,117 people. Charcas is just south of the Tropic of Cancer. Due to its elevation of 2,219 metres (7,280 ft), the climate is mild.

The town was founded in 1578 by Spanish conquistadors.

== Government ==
=== Municipal presidents ===
Term	Municipal president	Political party	Notes
1956–1958	José Rodríguez Álvarez and Nicolás Zupido	PRI	
1959–1961	J. Encarnación Martínez Nieves and Marcelo Hernández	PRI	
1962–1964	Marcelo Hernández and Ponciano Zúñiga	PRI	
1965–1967	Antonio Vidales Galván	PRI	
1968–1970	Pedro Cortés Salazar	PRI	
1971–1973	Fausto R. Navarro Aguilar	PRI	
1974–1976	Juan Zúñiga Duque	PRI	
1977–1979	Hipólito Revillas Aguilar	PRI	
1980–1982	Ignacio Lugo Guerrero	PRI	
1983–1985	Armando Vigil Rodríguez	PRI	
1986–1988	Vicente Castro Valdés	PRI	
1989–1991	Victorino Carranza García	PRI	
1992–1994	Blanca Rosa Navarro González	PRI	
1995–1997	Pedro Carlos Colunga González	PRI	
1997–2000	Agustín Hernández Moreno	PRI	
2000–2003	Pedro Carlos Colunga González	PRI	
2004–2006	Humberto Quiroz Leija	PT; PCP; PC	
2006–2009	Rafael Silva Blanco	PRI; Partido Alternativa Socialdemócrata y Campesina (PASC)	
2009–2012	Víctor Manuel Guevara Coronado	PAN	
2012–2015	Francisco Gutiérrez García	PRI; PVEM	
2015–2018	Luis Armando Colunga González	PRI; PVEM; Panal	
2018–2021	Manuel López Lara	PVEM	
2021–2024	Marisol Nájera Alba	PT; PVEM	
2024–	Marisol Nájera Alba	PVEM; PT; Morena	She was reelected on 02/06/2024
