= Armadillo de los Infante =

Coordinates: 22.25°N 100.65°W

- Municipality and town
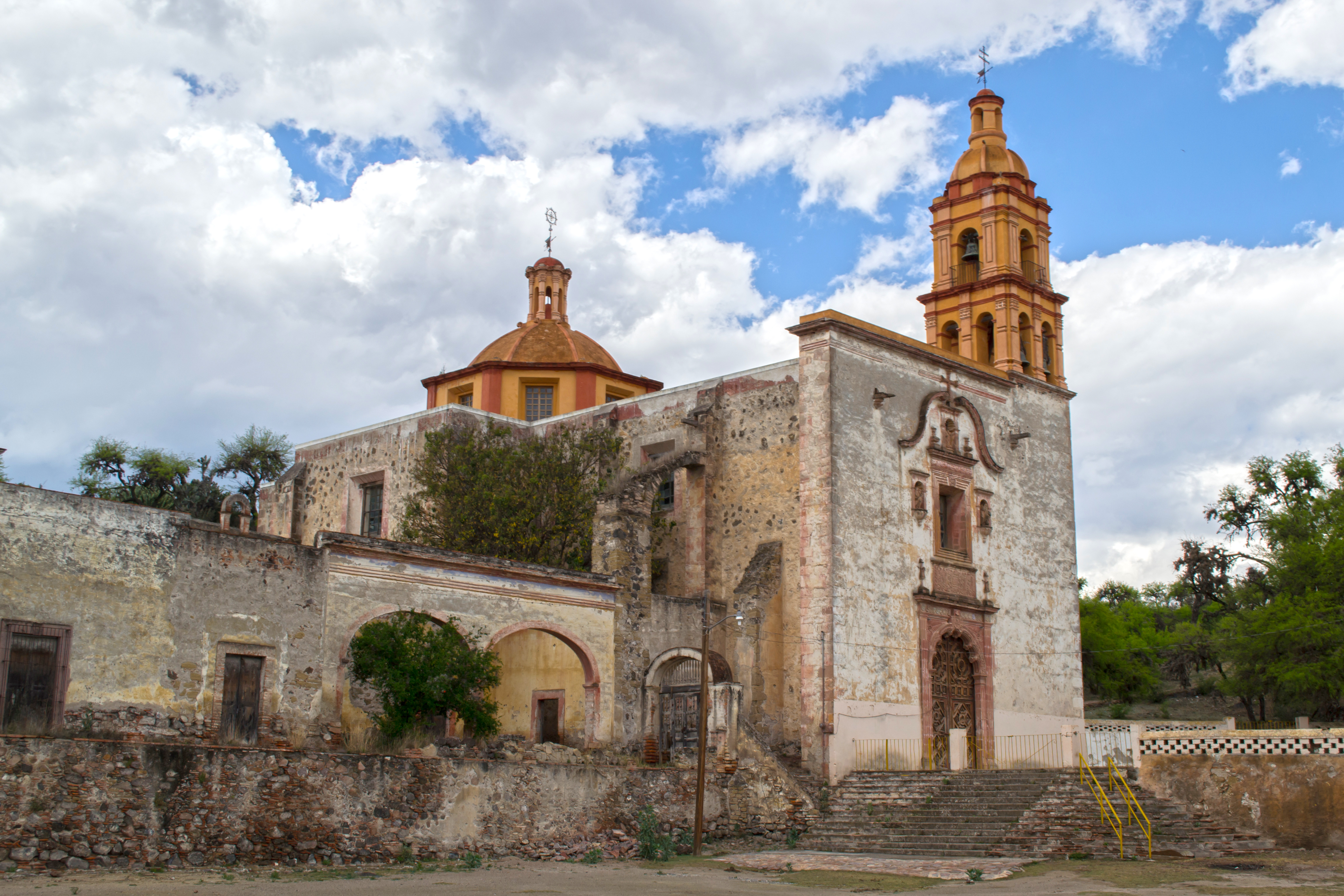
- Templo de La Virgen del Carmen in Pozo del Carmen
- Interactive map of Armadillo de los Infante
- Country: Mexico
- State: San Luis Potosí
- Time zone: UTC-6 (Zona Centro)

Armadillo de los Infante is a town and municipality in the central Mexican state of San Luis Potosí.

== Name ==
The name of the town is in honor of the Infante family, owners of the first printing company there, in the early nineteenth century.

== Geography ==
It is located at the center of the state and approximately 61 kilometers from the city of San Luis Potosí.

=== Climate ===
The municipality is semi-warm climate with warm summer rains. The average annual temperature is 18 °C, with a maximum of 27 °C and minimum of 1 °C. The rain is normal between the months of May and August, with an average of 304.7 mm.

== Places of interest ==
Church of the Immaculate Conception, Printing house, Ex Hacienda Pozo del Carmen, Dam Sweet Vara.
