= Aquismón =

Coordinates: 21°37′21″N 99°01′12″W

- Municipality and town
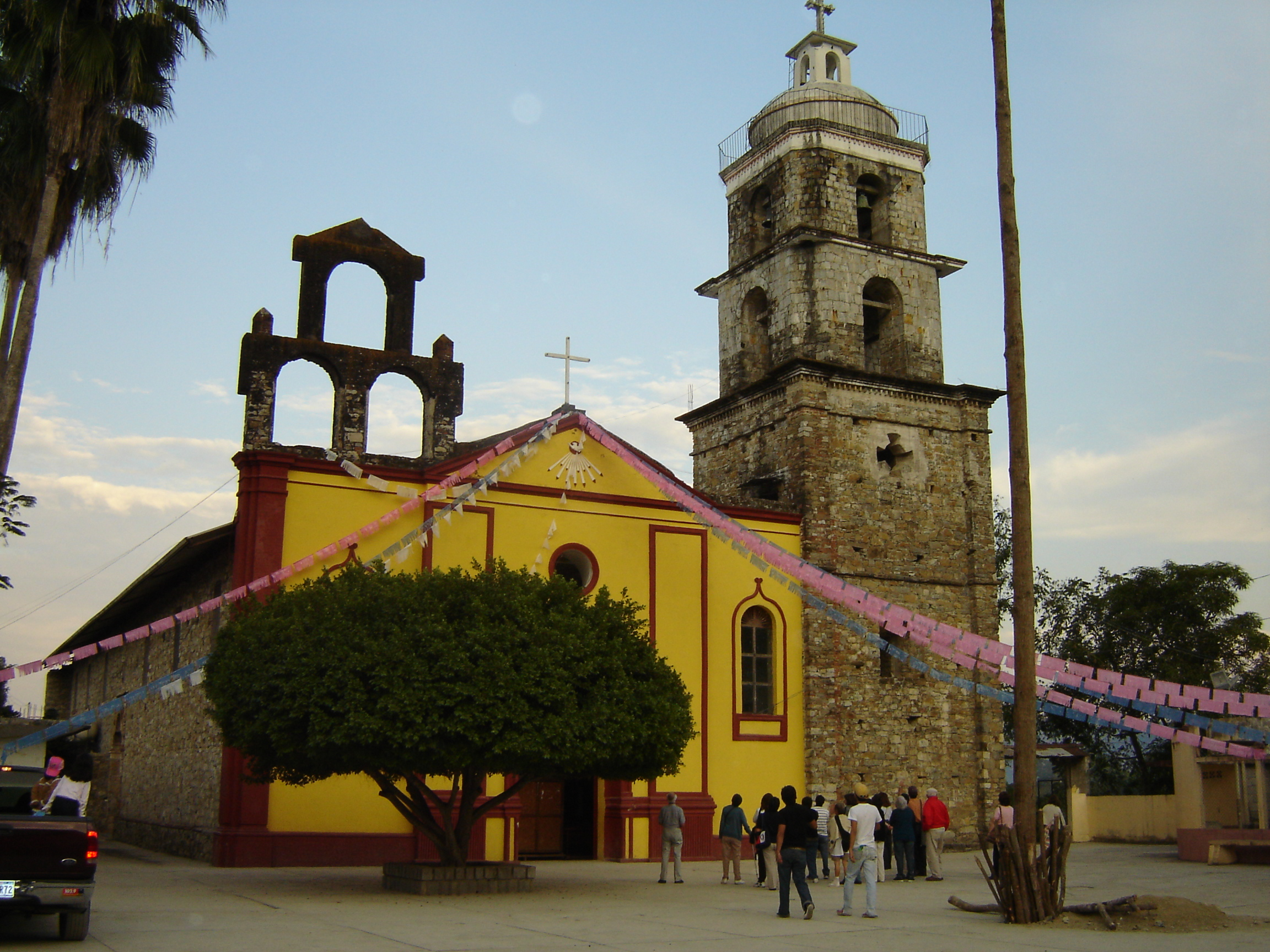
- Temple of San Miguel Arcángel in Aquismón, San Luis Potosí

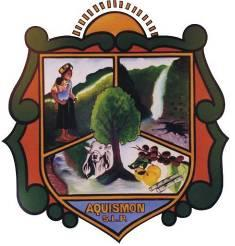
- Coat of arms
- Interactive map of Aquismón
- Country: Mexico
- State: San Luis Potosí

Population (2020)
  - Total: 47,423
- Time zone: UTC-6 (Zona Centro)

Aquismón is a town and municipality in the central Mexican state of San Luis Potosí. In 2010 the municipality had an area of 796 square kilometres (307 sq mi) and a population of 47,423. The town had a population of 2,127.
