= Tierra Nueva, San Luis Potosí =

Tierra Nueva
- Municipality and town
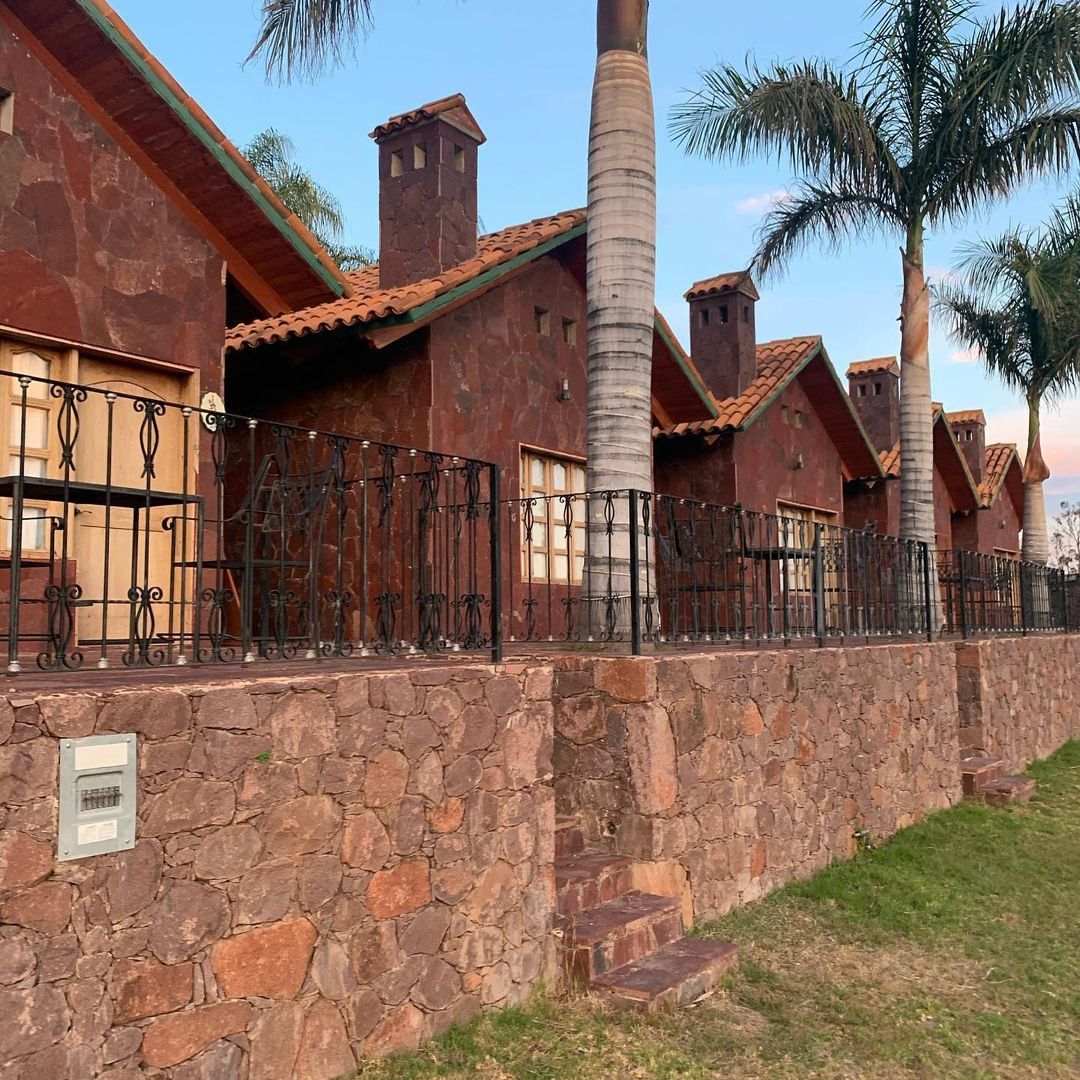
- Interactive map of Tierra Nueva
- Coordinates: 21°40′04″N 100°34′24″W
- Country: Mexico
- State: San Luis Potosí
- Time zone: UTC-6 (Zona Centro)

Tierra Nueva is a town and municipality in the central Mexican state of San Luis Potosí. It has close to 5,000 inhabitants and is at 1,780 meters above sea level.

In 2023, Tierra Nueva was designated a Pueblo Mágico by the Mexican government, recognizing its cultural and historical importance.
