= Lagunillas, San Luis Potosí =

Coordinates: 21°35′N 99°34′W

- Municipality and town
- Interactive map of Lagunillas, San Luis Potosí
- Country: Mexico
- State: San Luis Potosí
- Time zone: UTC-6 (Zona Centro)

Lagunillas, San Luis Potosí is a town and municipality in the central Mexican state of San Luis Potosí.
