= Coxcatlán, San Luis Potosí =

Coxcatlán
- Municipality
- Location in San Luis Potosí Location in Mexico
- Coordinates: 21°32′N 98°54′W
- Country: Mexico
- State: San Luis Potosí

Population (2020)
  - Total: 15,660
- Time zone: UTC-6 (Zona Centro)

Coxcatlán Municipality is a municipality in the central Mexican state of San Luis Potosí.
