= San Ciro de Acosta =

Coordinates: 21°38′N 99°49′W

San Ciro de Acosta Pedro Montoya
- Municipality
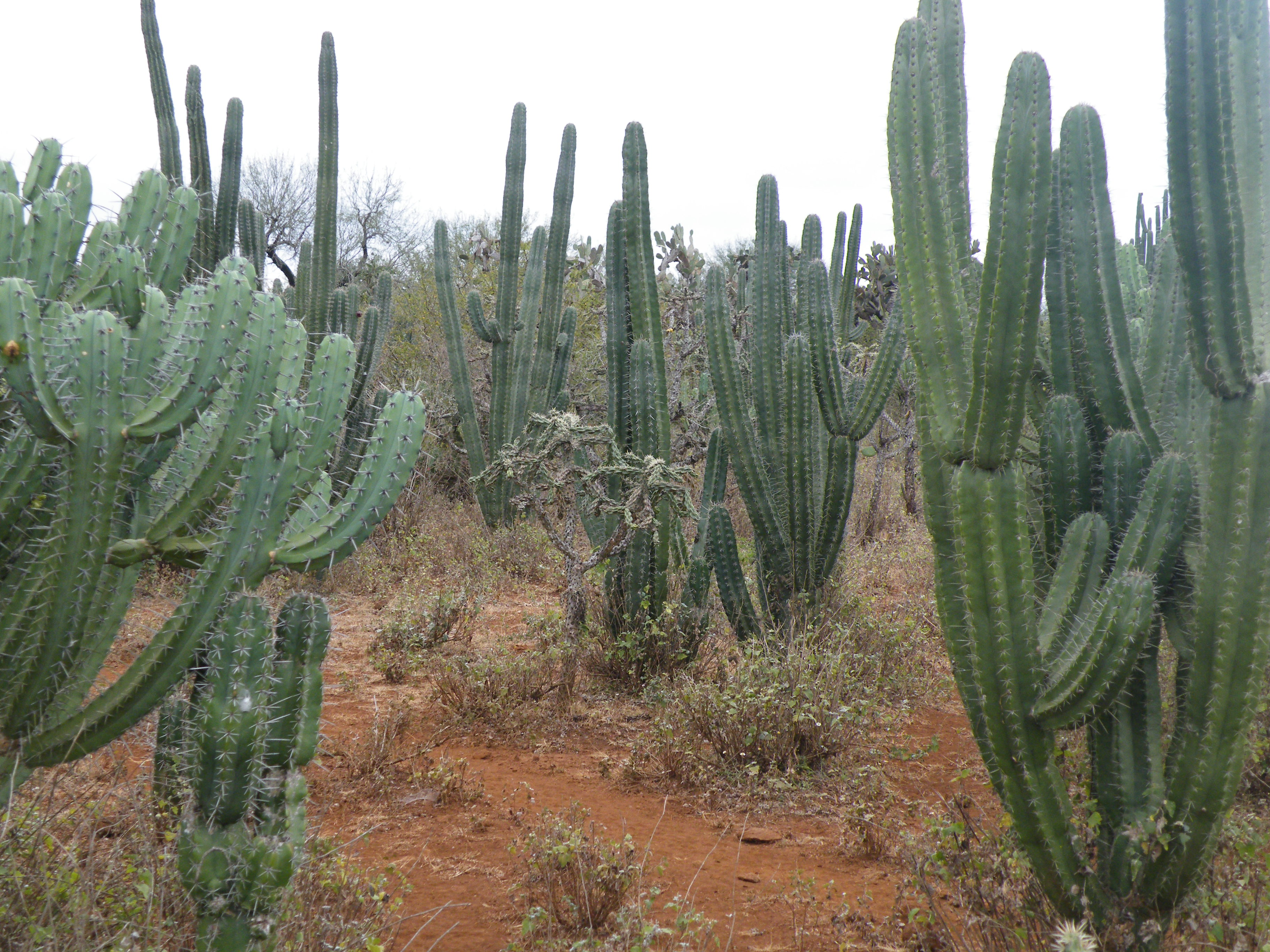
- South San Ciro De Acosta, SLP
- Interactive map of San Ciro de Acosta
- Country: Mexico
- State: San Luis Potosí

Government
  - Presidente Municipal: Luis Carlos Pereyra

Population (2020)
  - Total: 9,995
- (estimate)
- Time zone: UTC-6 (Zona Centro)

San Ciro de Acosta is a town and municipality in the central Mexican state of San Luis Potosí.
