= Villa de Reyes =

Coordinates: 21°48′N 100°56′W

- Municipality and town
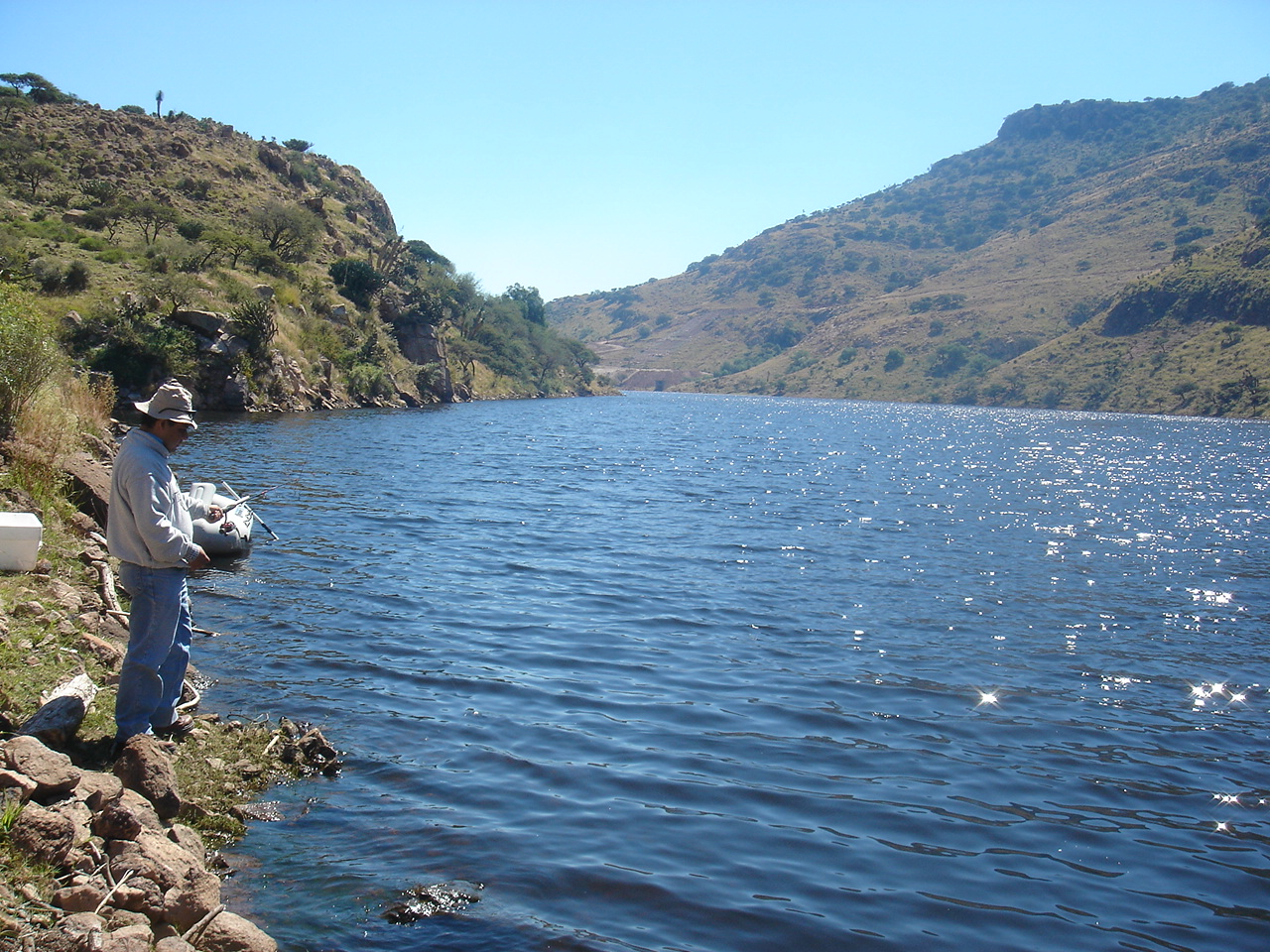
- Presa Calderon - panoramio
- Interactive map of Villa de Reyes
- Country: Mexico
- State: San Luis Potosí

Area
  - Land: 1,041.09 km^{2} (401.97 sq mi)
- Elevation: 1,820 m (5,970 ft)
- Time zone: UTC-6 (Zona Centro)

Villa de Reyes is a town and municipality in the central Mexican state of San Luis Potosí.
