= San Antonio, San Luis Potosí =

- Municipality and town
- Location in Mexico San Antonio, San Luis Potosí (Mexico)
- Coordinates: 21°37′00″N 98°54′00″W
- Country: Mexico
- State: San Luis Potosí

Population (2020)
  - Total: 9,382 (municipality)
- Time zone: UTC-6 (Zona Centro)

San Antonio is a town and municipality in the Mexican state of San Luis Potosí.

In the 2020 Census, the municipality reported a total of 9,382 inhabitants, a drop of -0.085% compared to the 2010 figure.
