= Villa de Guadalupe, San Luis Potosí =

Coordinates: 23°22′N 100°45′W

Guadalupe
- Municipality and town
- Interactive map of Guadalupe
- Country: Mexico
- State: San Luis Potosí

Population (2020 census)
  - Total: 9,277
- Time zone: UTC-6 (Zona Centro)

Villa de Guadalupe is a town and municipality in the central Mexican state of San Luis Potosí.
