= Villa de La Paz =

Coordinates: 23°41′N 100°43′W

- Municipality and town
- Interactive map of Villa de La Paz
- Country: Mexico
- State: San Luis Potosí
- Time zone: UTC-6 (Zona Centro)

Villa de La Paz is a town and municipality in the central Mexican state of San Luis Potosí.
