= Huehuetlán =

Coordinates: 21°33′N 98°58′W

- Municipality and town
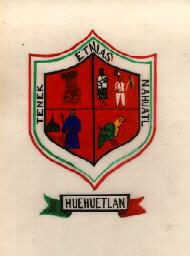
- Coat of arms
- Interactive map of Huehuetlán
- Country: Mexico
- State: San Luis Potosí
- Time zone: UTC-6 (Zona Centro)

Huehuetlán is a town and municipality in the central Mexican state of San Luis Potosí.
