= Salinas de Hidalgo =

- Nickname: Cochinillas
- Coordinates: 22°37′40.87″N 101°42′56.05″W
- Country: Mexico
- State: San Luis Potosí
- Founded: September 8, 1596
- Elevation: 2,075 m (6,808 ft)

Population (2010)
  - Total: 16,821
- Time zone: UTC-6 (Zona Centro)

Salinas de Hidalgo, also known as Salinas del Peñón Blanco, is a small town located in the northwestern part of the Mexican state of San Luis Potosí. It is the seat of the municipality of Salinas.

It attracts a variety of tourists because of its historical contents, and quality of being. It is believed that at one time it used to belong to the colonial state Zacatecas, but even today, people still argue whether it was. It is a municipal seat surrounded by ranches and places that seem of interest because of its mass in culture, and religious values. Salinas is also known for its beautiful mountain range outside on the eastern part of the town.

== Government ==
=== Municipal presidents ===
Municipal president	Term	Political party	Notes
Raúl Izas Galván	01-01-1950–31-12-1952	PRI	
Juan Manuel Córdoba	01-01-1953–31-12-1955	PRI	
Raúl Izas Córdoba	01-01-1956–31-12-1958	PRI	
Daniel Calzada	01-01-1959–31-12-1961	PRI	
Pedro Villalobos	01-01-1962–31-12-1964	PRI	
Daniel L. Calzada	01-01-1965–31-12-1967	PRI	
José Torres García	01-01-1968–31-12-1970	PRI	
Irene Cadena de Lozano	01-01-1971–31-12-1973	PRI	
Alfonso Ruedas Ortiz	01-01-1974–31-12-1976	PRI	
Pedro Delgado Calzada	01-01-1977–31-12-1979	PRI	
Arturo Chávez Izaguirre	01-01-1980–31-12-1982	PRI	
Benjamín Noyola Guerrero	01-01-1983–31-12-1985	PRI	
Francisco Páez Galván	01-01-1986–31-12-1988	PRI	
Humberto Páez Galván	01-01-1989–31-12-1991	PRI	
Efrén Cárdenas	01-01-1992–31-12-1994	PRI	
Antonio Venancio Páez Galván	01-01-1995–31-12-1997	PRI	
María de los Ángeles Vega Calzada	01-01-1998–31-12-2000	PAN	
Francisco Páez Galván	01-01-2001–31-12-2003	PRI	
Antonio Venancio Páez Galván	01-01-2004–31-12-2006	PAN	
Teódulo Contreras Martínez	01-01-2007–30-09-2009	PAN; Panal	
Adriana Vega Calzada	01-10–2009–30-09-2012	PAN; Panal	
Salvador Hernández Gallegos	01-10-2012–30-09-2015	PRD; PT; MC	
Antonio Venancio Páez Galván	01-10-2015–30-09-2018	PRI; Panal	
Antonio Venancio Páez Galván	01-10-2018–30-09-2021	PRI	
Emmanuel Castro Álvarez	01-10-2021–30-09-2024	PAN PRI	
Antonio Venancio Páez Galván	01-10-2024–	Partido Conciencia Popular	
