= Cerritos, San Luis Potosí =

Cerritos
- Town
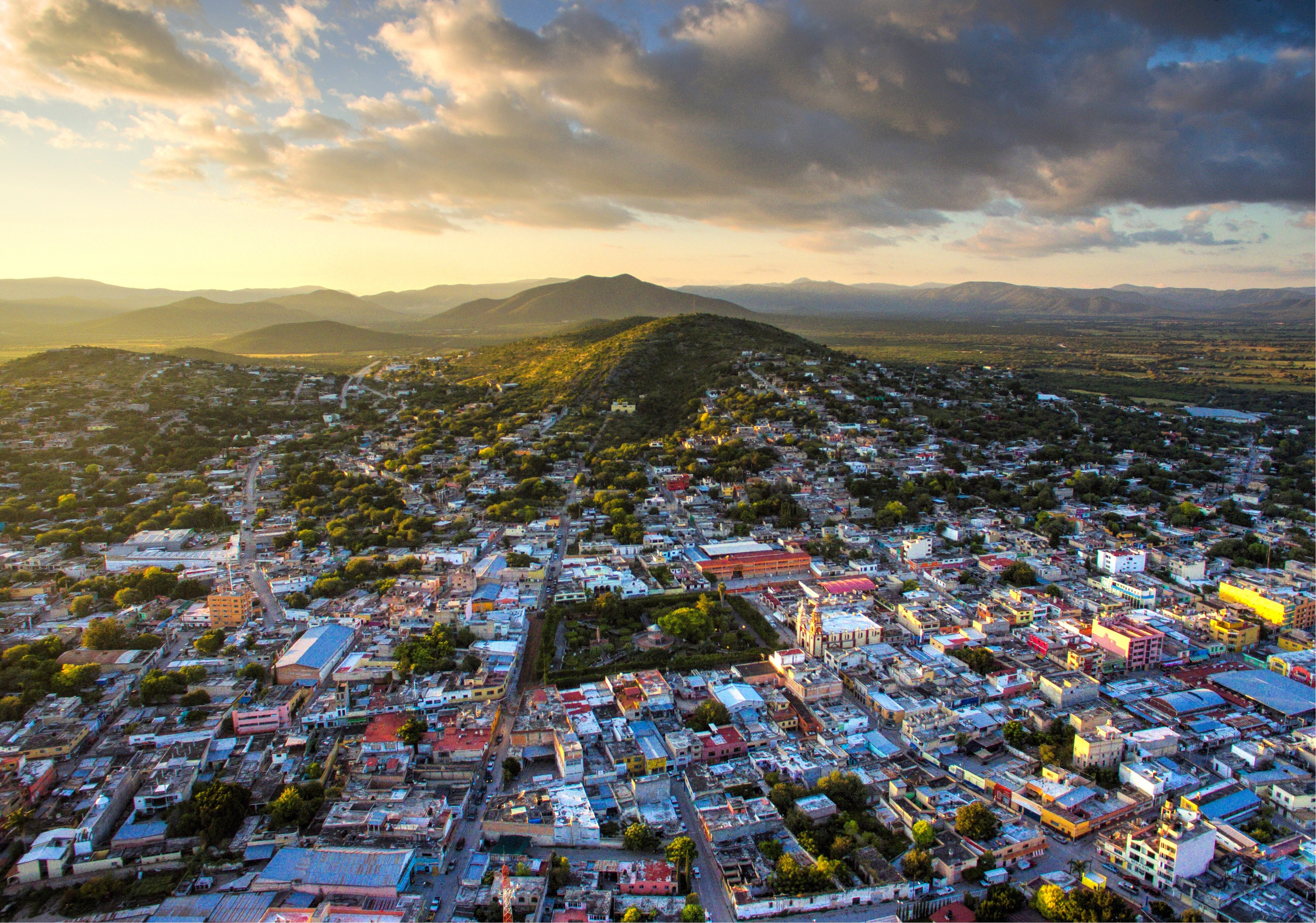
- Panoramic view of the Town

- Location in Mexico Location in San Luis Potosí
- Coordinates: 22°25′39″N 100°16′42″W
- Country: Mexico
- State: San Luis Potosi
- Municipality: Cerritos

Government
  - Municipal President (Presidente Municipal): Lic. María Leticia Vázquez Hernández (PV)
- Elevation: 3,724 ft (1,135 m)

Population (2010)
  - Town: 14,804
  - Metro: 21,394
- Demonym: Cerritense
- Time zone: UTC-6 (Zona Centro)
- Area code: 486 (phone code)
- Website: vivecerritosslp.wix.com/vivecerritosslp

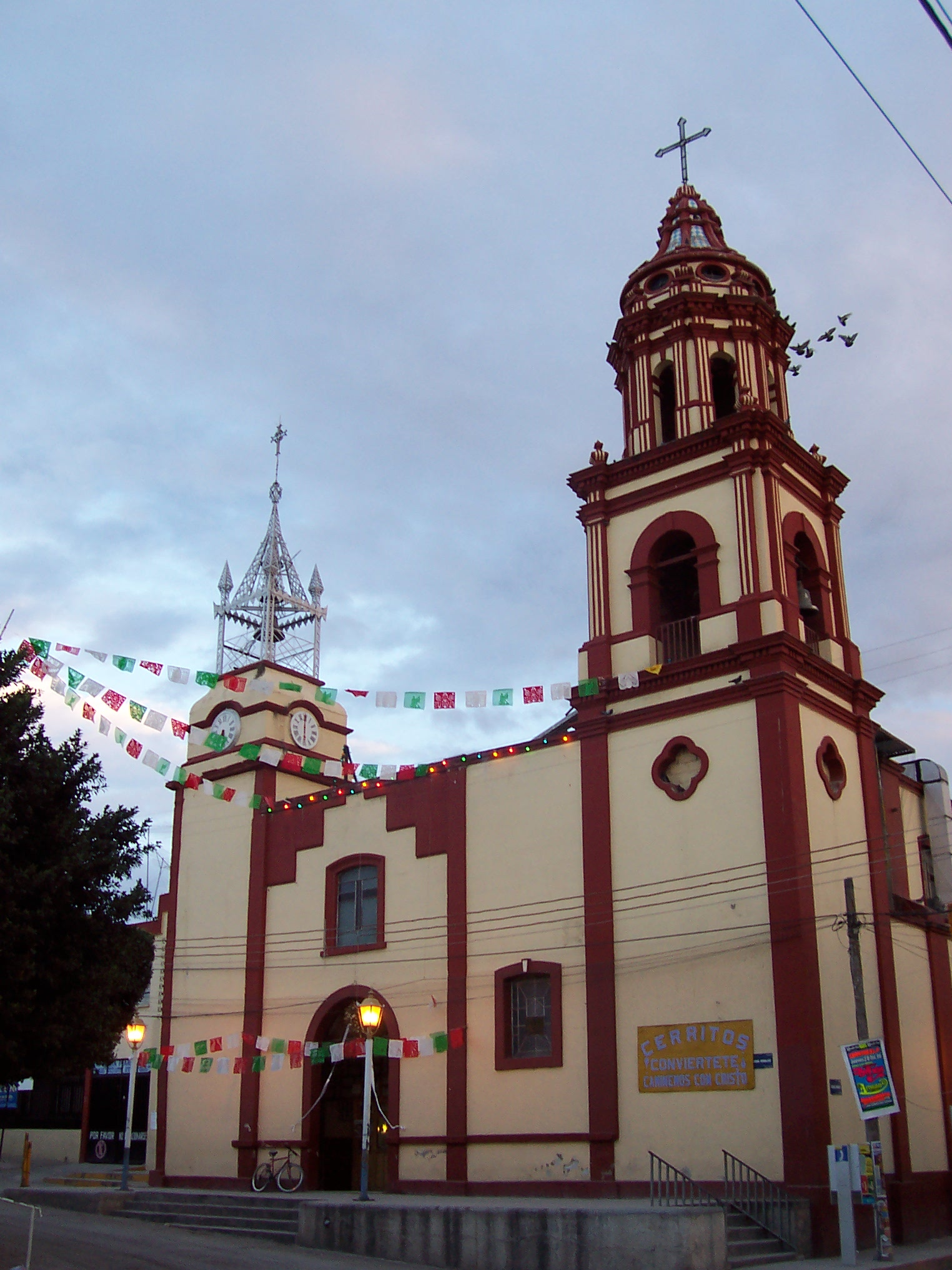
Cathedral of Cerritos, SLP

San Juan de Los Cerritos, commonly known as Cerritos, is a Town located in the central part of San Luis Potosí, a state of Mexico. It was founded in 1826 by the state's Congress. It is within the mid-zone of the state called La Zona Media. Within its municipality, which is the center of, it holds about 51 other small towns. According to the 2010 census, the municipality has 21,394 people; having experienced tremendous growth. Much of its recent growth can be credited to the construction of the cement factory, Cemento Moctezuma, An industry that was dominated by Casa Gloria During the decades of the 1960s and 1970s. Nowadays Cerritos is expanding its population and more housing is being built near the outskirts of the town due to the influx of new residents.

== Geography ==
=== Location ===
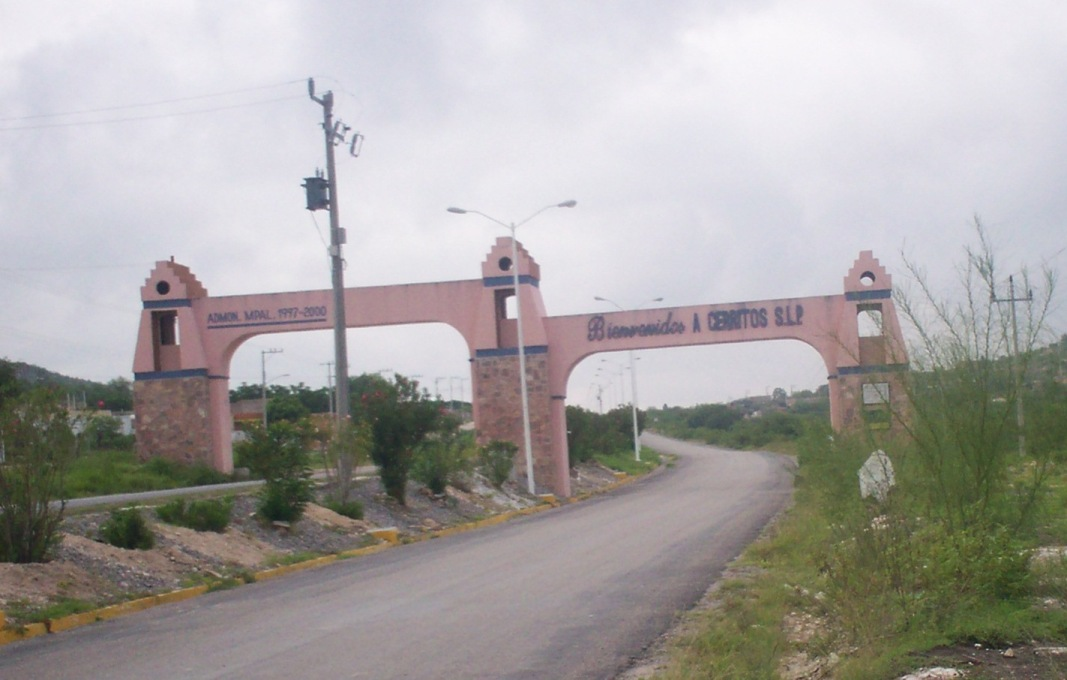
Entrance Arches of Cerritos

Cerritos is located in the "Middle Zone" (Zona Media) of the state. It is bordered on the north by Guadalcázar, in the south by Villa Juárez, on the west by Villa Hidalgo, and on the southwest by Armadillo de Los Infante and San Nicolás Tolentino. Its area spans about 935 square kilometers. Its geographic location is north 22'15 and west 100'01 and is 1135 meters above sea level. The city is surrounded by mountains of varying heights, and it itself is located on a low-lying mountain. It is generally cool all year long because of this. Cerritos is approximately an hour and a half (90 minutes) from the State's capital and largest city of San Luis [Potosi], with a population of about a million.

== History ==
Martin de Turrubiartes founded the town of Cerritos, San Luis Potosi in about 1640. Cerritos was then part of Guadalcázar. It was finally established by state decree in 1826. It was granted a train station which connected the state capital, San Luis Potosí, and Tampico, a port in the Gulf of Mexico. The Mexican Revolution brought much destruction and famine in the early 1900s. During these years Cerritos was under the Cedillista campaign. Small skirmishes and battles, looting, and the absence of men who left to fight were at the core of the problems for the town. Life in Cerritos did not return to normal until 1918. Cerritos is now a growing city of San Luis Potosí

== Economy ==
Agriculture and Cement Production are the major contributors to its economic activity. Corn, sorghum, beans, and pepper are the main crops. Cerritos was considered the main corn producer of the state, however, due to the diversification of crops, it has since lost that title. Livestock (cattle) and lumber (mesquite) are also widely produced from its various forest areas for exportation. A major intrastate bus company, Autobuses Cerritenses, is headquartered in Cerritos.

== Culture ==
Cerritos hosts an annual "Feria," or traveling carnival in honor of the patron saint, San Juan Bautista for about a week and a half until the main celebration on June 24. This festivity consists of booths that sell artifacts, ceramics, pottery, regional delicacies, food, drinks, games, literature, and small widgets among other things. Rides are also a main attraction of the carnival. A stage is also constructed for shows, regional and national folklore dances, musicians, speeches, and plays. Many tourists come from all parts of the state of San Luis Potosí and from the United States for this traditional event, though most tourists are returning residents and their families who now live in the United States.

== Notable people ==
Latin Grammy Award winning band Grupo Bryndis "El Grupo Que Le Canta Al Amor".
