= Santa Catarina, San Luis Potosí =

Coordinates: 21°39′26″N 99°29′45″W

Santa Catarina (San Luis Potosí)
- Municipality and town
- Interactive map of Santa Catarina (San Luis Potosí)
- Country: Mexico
- State: San Luis Potosí
- Time zone: UTC-6 (Zona Centro)

Santa Catarina (San Luis Potosí) is a town and municipality in the central Mexican state of San Luis Potosí.
