= 4th federal electoral district of San Luis Potosí =

Federal electoral district of Mexico

San Luis Potosí's 4th
- Electoral district of the Chamber of Deputies of Mexico

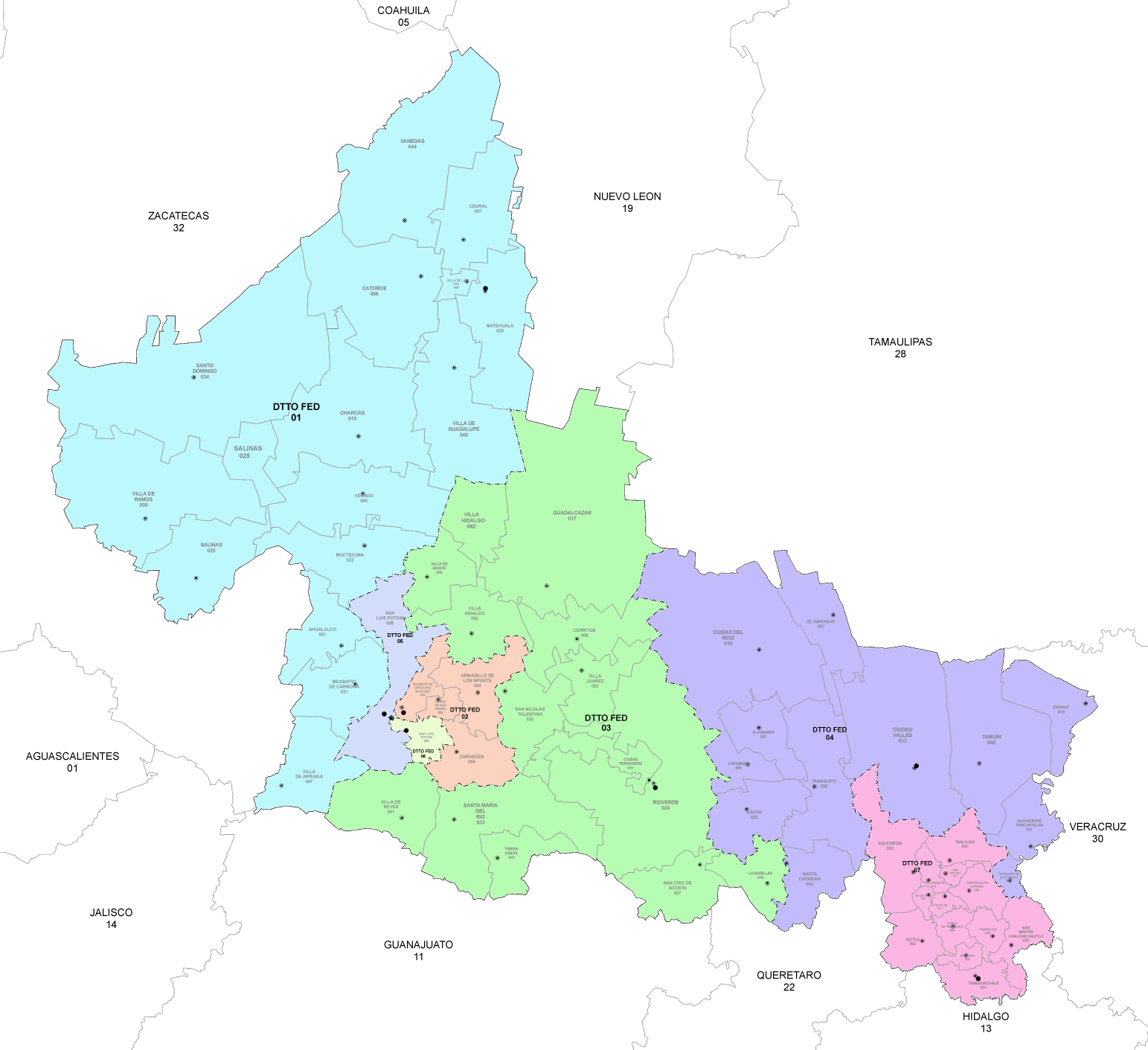
- 4th district since 2023

Incumbent
- Member: Francisco Adrián Castillo Morales
- Party: ▌Morena
- Congress: 66th (2024–2027)

District
- State: San Luis Potosí
- Head town: Ciudad Valles
- Coordinates: 21°59′N 99°01′W
- Covers: 12 municipalities: Alaquines, Cárdenas, Ciudad del Maíz, Ciudad Valles, Ébano, Rayón, San Vicente Tancuayalab, Santa Catarina, Tamasopo, Tamuín, Tanquián de Escobedo, El Naranjo
- PR region: Second
- Precincts: 333
- Population: 419,880 (2020 census)

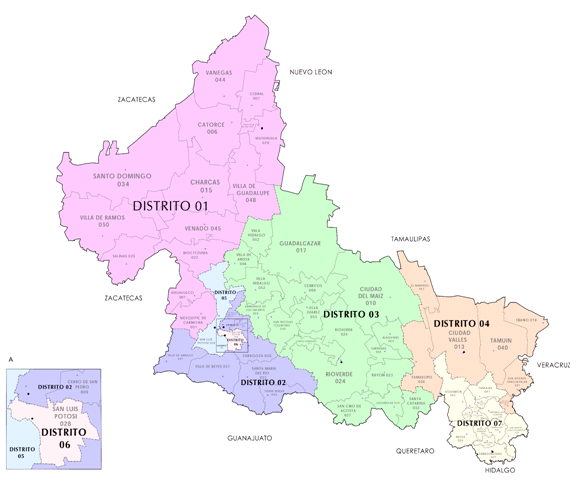
San Luis Potosí under the 2017–2022 scheme

The 4th federal electoral district of San Luis Potosí (Spanish: Distrito electoral federal 04 de San Luis Potosí) is one of the 300 electoral districts into which Mexico is divided for elections to the federal Chamber of Deputies and one of seven such districts in the state of San Luis Potosí.

It elects one deputy to the lower house of Congress for each three-year legislative session by means of the first-past-the-post system. Votes cast in the district also count towards the calculation of proportional representation ("plurinominal") deputies elected from the second region.

The current member for the district, elected in the 2024 general election, is Francisco Adrián Castillo Morales of the National Regeneration Movement (Morena).

== District territory ==
Under the 2023 districting plan adopted by the National Electoral Institute (INE), which is to be used for the 2024, 2027 and 2030 federal elections, the 4th district shares the eastern portion of the state with the 7th district. It covers 333 electoral precincts (secciones electorales) across 12 of the state's municipalities:

- Alaquines, Cárdenas, Ciudad del Maíz, Ciudad Valles, Ébano, Rayón, San Vicente Tancuayalab, Santa Catarina, Tamasopo, Tamuín, Tanquián de Escobedo and El Naranjo.

The district's head town (cabecera distrital), where results from individual polling stations are gathered together and tallied, is at Ciudad Valles. The district reported a population of 419,880 in the 2020 census.

== Previous districting schemes ==
Evolution of electoral district numbers
	1974	1978	1996	2005	2017	2023
San Luis Potosí	5	7	7	7	7	7
Chamber of Deputies	196	300				

2017–2022

Between 2017 and 2022, the district was further east within the state. It covered seven municipalities: Ciudad Valles, Ébano, San Vicente Tancuayalab, Tamasopo, Tamuín, Tanquián de Escobedo and El Naranjo. The head town was at Ciudad Valles.

2005–2017

Under the 2005 districting plan, the district had its head town at Ciudad Valles and it covered eight municipalities: Ciudad Valles, Ébano, El Naranjo, San Vicente Tancuayalab, Santa Catarina, Tamasopo, Tamuin and Tanquián de Escobedo.

1996–2005

From 1996 to 2005, the district had its head town at Ciudad Valles and it covered nine municipalities: the same eight as in the 2005 scheme, plus Tanlajás.

1978–1996

The districting scheme in force from 1978 to 1996 was the result of the 1977 electoral reforms, which increased the number of single-member seats in the Chamber of Deputies from 196 to 300. Under that plan, San Luis Potosí's seat allocation rose from five to seven. The fourth district's head town was at Ciudad del Maíz and it covered the municipalities of Alaquines, Aquismón, Armadillo de los Infante, Cárdenas, Cerritos, Cerro de San Pedro, Ciudad del Maíz, Guadalcázar, Lagunillas, Rayón, San Ciro de Acosta, Santa Catarina, Tamasopo and Villa Juárez.

== Deputies returned to Congress ==
(Mexico) National parties
- Current
- PAN
- PRI
- PT
- PVEM
- MC
- Morena
- PAZ
- Somos
- Defunct or local only
- PLM
- PNR
- PRM
- PNM
- PP
- PPS
- PARM
- PFCRN
- CON
- PANAL
- PSD
- PES
- PES
- PRD

San Luis Potosí's 4th district
Election	Deputy	Party	Term	Legislature
1916	Rafael Nieto Compeán; Cosme Dávila		1916–1917	Constituent Congress of Querétaro
...
1967	Guillermo Fonseca Álvarez (Note: Fonseca Álvarez resigned his seat on 27 December 1967 and was replaced by his alternate, Zapata Loredo, two days later.); Fausto Zapata Loredo	Institutional Revolutionary Party	1967; 1967–1970	47th Congress
1970	Luis Tudón Hurtado	Institutional Revolutionary Party	1970–1973	48th Congress
1973	Vicente Ruiz Chiapeto	Institutional Revolutionary Party	1973–1976	49th Congress
1976	Héctor González Lárraga	Institutional Revolutionary Party	1976–1979	50th Congress
1979	Ángel Martínez Manzanares	Institutional Revolutionary Party	1979–1982	51st Congress
1982	Gerardo Ramos Romo	Institutional Revolutionary Party	1982–1985	52nd Congress
1985	Rosa María Armendáriz Muñoz	Institutional Revolutionary Party	1985–1988	53rd Congress
1988	Miguel de J. Martínez Castro	Institutional Revolutionary Party	1988–1991	54th Congress
1991	Jesús Mario del Valle Fernández	Institutional Revolutionary Party	1991–1994	55th Congress
1994	Antonio Rivera Barrón	Institutional Revolutionary Party	1994–1997	56th Congress
1997	Antonio Esper Bujaidar	Institutional Revolutionary Party	1997–2000	57th Congress
2000	José Manuel Medellín Milán	Institutional Revolutionary Party	2000–2003	58th Congress
2003	José María de la Vega Lárraga	National Action Party (Mexico)	2003–2006	59th Congress
2006	David Lara Compeán	National Action Party (Mexico)	2006–2009	60th Congress
2009	Delia Guerrero Coronado	Institutional Revolutionary Party	2009–2012	61st Congress
2012	Jorge Terán Juárez	Institutional Revolutionary Party	2012–2015	62nd Congress
2015	Cándido Ochoa Rojas	Ecologist Green Party of Mexico	2015–2018	63rd Congress
2018	José Ricardo Delsol Estrada	Ecologist Green Party of Mexico	2018–2021	64th Congress
2021	Antolín Guerrero Márquez	National Regeneration Movement	2021–2024	65th Congress
2024	Francisco Adrián Castillo Morales	National Regeneration Movement	2024–2027	66th Congress

== Presidential elections ==
San Luis Potosí's 4th district
Election	District won by	Party or coalition	%
2018	Andrés Manuel López Obrador	Juntos Haremos Historia	54.0019
2024	Claudia Sheinbaum Pardo	Sigamos Haciendo Historia	66.2728
