= Saturnino Cedillo =

Mexican politician and participant in the Mexican Revolution

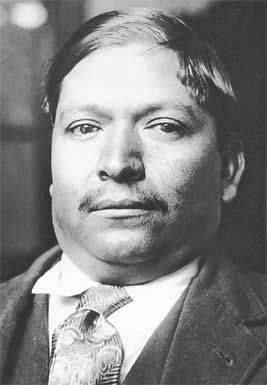
- Cedillo, c. 1915

Governor of San Luis Potosí
- In office 1927–1931
- Preceded by: Abel Cano Villa
- Succeeded by: Ildefonso Turrubiartes

Personal details
- Born: Saturnino Cedillo Martínez; November 29, 1890 Ciudad del Maíz, San Luis Potosí, Mexico
- Died: January 11, 1939 (aged 48) Sierra Ventana, San Luis Potosí, Mexico
- Party: National Revolutionary Party
- Relatives: María Marcos Cedillo Salas (niece)

Saturnino Cedillo Martínez (November 29, 1890 – January 11, 1939) was a Mexican soldier who participated in the Mexican Revolution and the Cristero War. He was governor of San Luis Potosí from 1927 to 1931 through the Partido Nacional Revolucionario (PNR) and served as Secretary of Agriculture on two occasions, one under President Pascual Ortiz Rubio and again under President Lázaro Cárdenas. He maintained de facto control of his home state until shortly before his death. He "was the last of the great military caciques of the Mexican Revolution who maintained his own quasi-private personal army," building a fiefdom in the state of San Luis Potosí.

Cedillo rose in rebellion against Cárdenas in 1938 and was killed.

== Early life ==
Saturnino Cedillo was the son of Amado Cedillo and Pantaleona Martínez. He was born in 1890 in Palomas, a ranch belonging to the municipality of Ciudad del Maíz. He was one of seven siblings: Elena, Homobono, Magdaleno, Cleofas, Engracia and Higinia. It would be thanks to his brothers Cleofas and Magdaleno that Saturnino went into the revolution.

The first actions of dissent by the Cedillo family were not against the government but rather the wealthy landowners who preyed on their small neighbor's lands and often served as government representatives, a type of practice that was widespread throughout the Porfiriato.

At first, the Cedillos showed little interest in political issues, much less the anti-reelectionist movement of Francisco I. Madero that gained strength after the economic crisis of 1907. Through a school teacher from the nearby Tula, Tamaulipas called Alberto Carrera Torres, a friend of Magdaleno Cedillo the brothers began their involvement in politics. However, even after being introduced to politics, Cedillo didn't show much interest in the Maderista movement, in part due to its lack of positioning regarding the "agrarian question".

== Mexican Revolution ==
The first armed revolt the Cedillo brothers were involved in was against the Maderista government which ruled San Luis Potosí at the time. On November 17, 1912 they participated in a group of coordinated attacks in Río Verde, Tula, and Ciudad del Maíz. At the end, Saturnino and Cleofas read the Plan of Ayala to the peasants. After hearing about the failure of their attack on Río Verde, the brothers retreated to Tula, where they decided to cross the border into the United States in order to flee. Cedillo then got arrested at the American border after trying to return to Mexico with weapons he had bought to arm his men. He was transferred to San Luis Potosí, where he spent a relatively short time in prison before being released.

After Madero's assassination, the Cedillos momentarily surrendered to the usurper Victoriano Huerta before they rose in arms against him. What followed was a series of political maneuvers that allowed Saturnino to be on the triumphant side of several political conflicts. At first they joined Venustiano Carranza's constitutionalist movement, only to join Villistas and Zapatistas at the Aguascalientes Convention in 1914 when the two groups disavowed Carranza's government.

After the death of his brothers Cleofas and Magdaleno shortly after the Battle of El Ébano in 1915 and after a skirmish near Ciudad del Maíz in 1917, respectively, Saturnino surrendered, but it was not accepted by the Constitucionalistas. After living in hiding for some years, things took a turn for the better with Álvaro Obregón's presidency. Cedillo adhered to the Plan of Agua Prieta and was rewarded with his inclusion in the Federal Army as a Brigade General. Cedillo was also given control of his native state.

== Political career ==
Saturnino Cedillo thrived under the rule of the sonorenses. After Plutarco Elías Calles took power in 1924, Cedillo's cacicazgo became stronger, as did his control over the state's political affairs. Cedillo was granted with even more control after his intervention in the Cristero War in which he was an important asset in fighting the Catholic rebels in Jalisco and Guanajuato, having killed their leader, Enrique Gorostieta in 1929. Cedillo himself was a Catholic and sympathized with the cristero cause, so that the antireligious "Calles Laws" were not being enforced in San Luis Potosí. His control allowed him to create and maintain military-agricultural colonies in his area of control, where veterans of his army and their widows could live and work the land. After Obregón's assassination at the hands of a Catholic activist, who also hailed from San Luis Potosí, Calles's hold on Mexico's politics became even stronger.

In 1930, Cedillo's niece, María Marcos Cedillo Salas, the daughter of his brother Homobono, learned to fly at the Civil Aviation School in San Luis Potosí, which he had been instrumental in setting up. She became Mexico's first female pilot and named her plane "Ángel del Infierno" (Angel of Hell) after the term that her uncle used to describe aircraft. She then became a flying instructor. Maria died in her plane when it crashed during aerial stunts in 1933. Cedillo is said to have fired all the bullets from his pistol at the remains of the plane, which he blamed for the death of his niece.

=== Friction with Cárdenas ===
Cedillo had briefly served as the Minister of Agriculture under Sonoran Pascual Ortiz Rubio. He was held in high regard by the agraristas, whom he convinced to support the presidential candidate Lázaro Cárdenas. Cedillo and Cárdenas shared similarities regarding land reform, but their beliefs on the matter differed radically as Cedillo was in favor of land reform based on the concept of private ownership, but Cárdenas was a proponent of ejidos, collective lands held by peasants under state control. Cárdenas got support from Cedillo in ousting Calles from his hold on presidential power after Cárdenas was elected president. There was a break between Cedillo and Cárdenas after 1937, with Cedillo taking positions perceived as conservative and in opposition to Cárdenas's policies. He was openly against the 1938 nationalization of oil and the electric industries. The differences would prove fatal for the relationship between the politicians. Cárdenas dismissed him as Minister of Agriculture, and agricultural aid to San Luis Potosí dried up. Losing the state’s support undercut Cedillo's ability to provide benefits to his political base of the peasantry. Cárdenas engaged the aid of labor leader Vicente Lombardo Toledano and the state-sponsored campesino organization to squeeze Cedillo. Cárdenas sacked Cedillo's head of the military in the state, weakening Cedillo's military control. Although right-wing groups in Mexico, including the fascist Gold Shirts, made overtures to Cedillo, their connection is exaggerated.

English author Graham Greene visited Cedillo at his home in Palomas. In his book about his travels to Mexico, Greene briefly describes meeting Cedillo and talks about the concern from the federal government of an uprising led by the agrarian warlord.

== Rebellion and death ==
In 1938, Cárdenas demanded that Cedillo leave his base of Valle del Maíz; in response, Cedillo took up arms. Most of Cedillo's private army had been disarmed, and important figures had been trying to convince him not to embark on a suicidal uprising against the cardenista government. Cedillo took up arms against Cárdenas and the rebellion was suppressed by January 1939. Cedillo was killed along with many of his relatives, including his sister and his son. According to one assessment, "He preferred to die rather than see his legend and honor tarnished before the eyes of those who had served under him during decades of fighting and in the construction of his campesino fiefdom."

== Legacy ==
Cedillo has been largely forgotten by historiography. This is in part because he was considered a traitor as he took up arms against the people, and in part due to Lombardo Toledano's accusations of Cedillo's links to the Nazis, which have since been disproven.
