= Rioverde, San Luis Potosí =

Rioverde
- City and Municipality
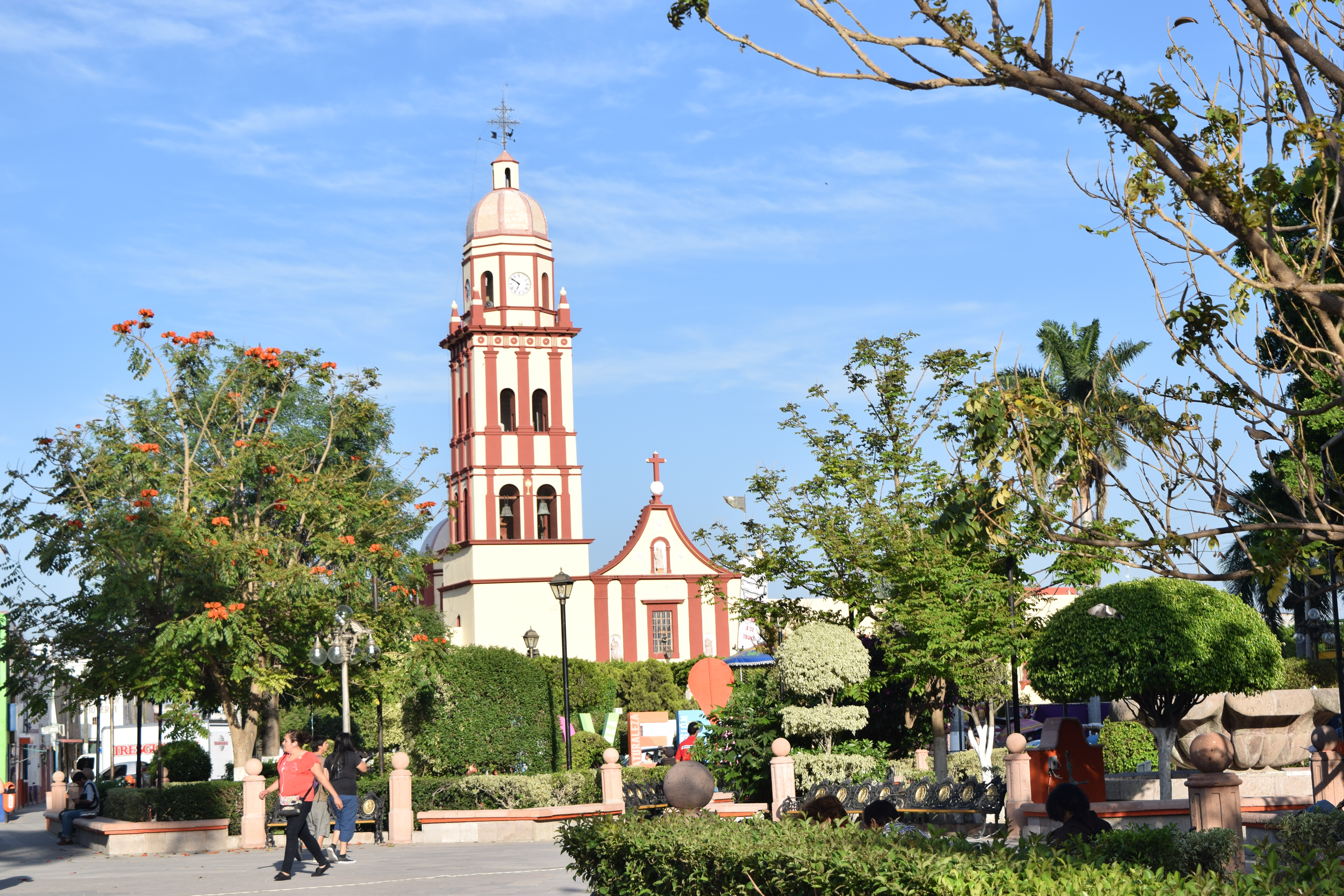
- Iglesia Santa Catarina

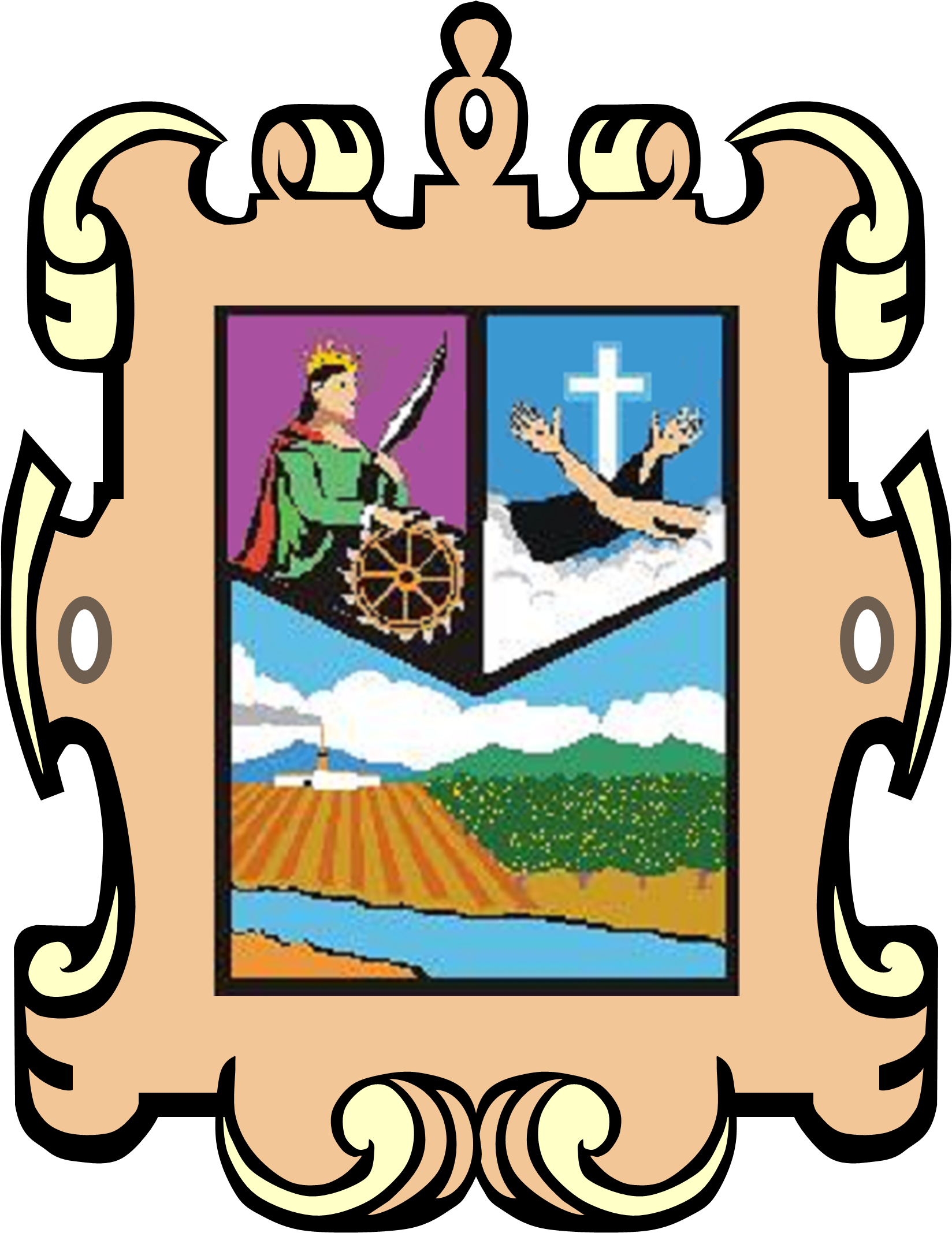
- Coat of arms

- Location of Rioverde in Mexico
- Coordinates: 21°55′40″N 99°59′49″W
- Country: Mexico
- State: San Luis Potosí
- Founded: July 1, 1617

Area
  - Municipality: 3,064 km^{2} (1,183 sq mi)
  - City: 20.45 km^{2} (7.90 sq mi)

Population (2020 census)
  - Municipality: 97,943
  - Density: 31.97/km^{2} (82.79/sq mi)
  - City: 58,158
  - City density: 2,844/km^{2} (7,366/sq mi)
- Demonym: Rioverdense
- Time zone: UTC-6 (Zona Centro)

Rioverde is a city and its surrounding municipality located in the south-central part of the state of San Luis Potosí, Mexico. It is the fifth-most populated city in the state, behind San Luis Potosí, Soledad de Graciano Sánchez, Ciudad Valles, and Matehuala. The city had a 2005 census population of 49,183, while the municipality, of which it serves as municipal seat, had a population of 85,945 and an area extent of 3,064 km^{2} (1,183 sq mi). The population of its metropolitan area, which includes the largest municipality of Ciudad Fernández, was 126,997.

The city is well known for its spring, called Media Luna. The city has been growing faster in the last four years. Rioverde lives up to its name in its rich surroundings and round the year pleasant weather. It is the birthplace of singer Ana Bárbara, former FBI fugitive José Manuel García Guevara and composer Amador Ramos. The town has an Institute of Higher Education, the Technical Institute of Rioverde. It is one of the higher education federal institutes.

== Tourism ==
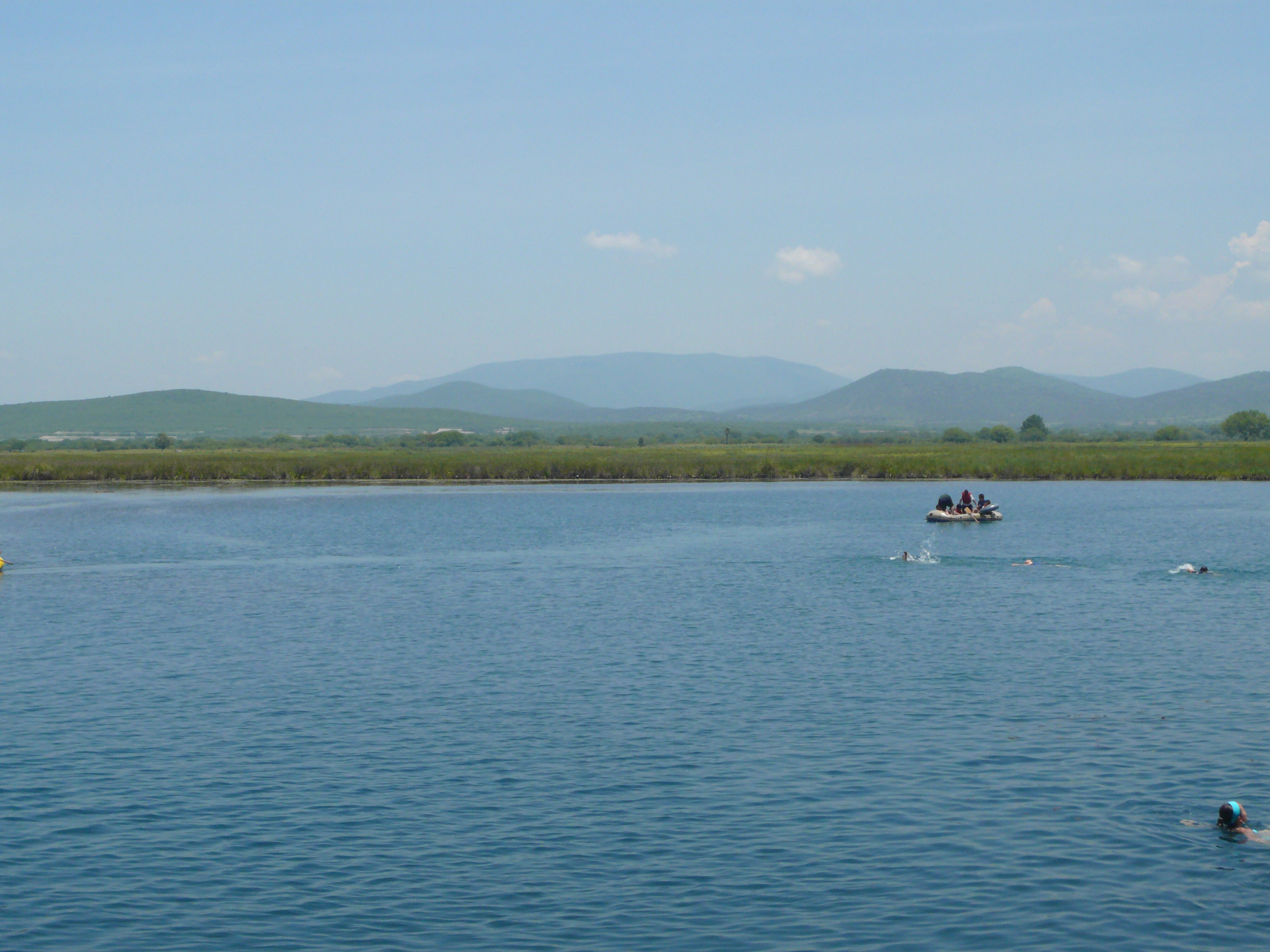
View of the Media Luna lagoon

La Media Luna is a popular tourist site located 10 km from Rioverde. The lake gets its name for having the shape of a half moon. The area also includes a swimming and camping area. With depths of more than 50 meters and a sub aquatic cavern the area well known to scuba divers and the scientific community in San Luis Potosí for its archaeological remains.

Las Grutas de la Catedral y del Ángel, are caverns situated near Rioverde, although slightly remote from federal highway Route 70. Las Grutas de la Catedral gets its name because the stalactites and stalagmites have formed a veritable cathedral in its interior with a pulpit, a choir and some pews. Recently discovered Gruta del Ángel is located 700 meters from it. Named after stalactites and stalagmites that resemble an angel.

Also nearby attraction is Tamasopo is located on federal highway 70 heading towards Ciudad Valles, S.L.P.

Sotano de las Golondrinas: “The Cave of the Swallows” is one of the largest open pit caves in the world, situated on the east side of the Sierra Madre Mountains from Rioverde.

About 15 minutes away from Rio Verde are the towns of El Refugio, La Loma, San Diego and San Martin. In the region they are known for their traditional annual festivities which venerate the local patron saint of each town. San Diego is located between the towns of La Loma and San Martin and in November is the town's annual festivities are celebrated. The annual festivities of La Loma are celebrated annually each July 4 to 12.

== Geography ==
The municipality of Rioverde is located in the "Middle Zone" (Zona Media) of the state of San Luis Potosí, in the Sierra Madre Oriental. The land consists of high plains and mountains. It lies between 22° 25’ and 21° 33’ North latitude, and 99° 44’ to 100° 25’ West longitude, with altitude ranging from 100 meters to 2,600 meters.

Rioverde municipality is bounded on the northwest by the municipality of Villa Juárez; on the northeast by Ciudad del Maíz municipality; on the east by the municipalities of Alaquines, Cárdenas, and Rayón; on the southeast by San Ciro de Acosta municipality; on the south by the state of Guanajuato; on the southwest by the municipality of Santa María del Río; and on the west by the municipalities Ciudad Fernández, and San Nicolás Tolentino.

=== Climate ===
Climate data for Rioverde, San Luis Potosí (1951–2010, extremes 1961–2024)
Month	Jan	Feb	Mar	Apr	May	Jun	Jul	Aug	Sep	Oct	Nov	Dec	Year
Record high °C (°F)	37.4 (99.3)	39.0 (102.2)	41.1 (106.0)	44.0 (111.2)	45.2 (113.4)	43.5 (110.3)	39.6 (103.3)	38.8 (101.8)	39.0 (102.2)	38.8 (101.8)	37.8 (100.0)	35.0 (95.0)	45.2 (113.4)
Mean daily maximum °C (°F)	23.8 (74.8)	26.7 (80.1)	30.6 (87.1)	33.4 (92.1)	34.5 (94.1)	33.1 (91.6)	31.7 (89.1)	31.7 (89.1)	29.9 (85.8)	28.0 (82.4)	26.0 (78.8)	24.2 (75.6)	29.5 (85.1)
Daily mean °C (°F)	16.2 (61.2)	18.3 (64.9)	21.6 (70.9)	24.5 (76.1)	26.3 (79.3)	26.1 (79.0)	25.0 (77.0)	25.0 (77.0)	23.8 (74.8)	21.6 (70.9)	19.0 (66.2)	17.0 (62.6)	22.0 (71.6)
Mean daily minimum °C (°F)	8.5 (47.3)	9.9 (49.8)	12.6 (54.7)	15.7 (60.3)	18.2 (64.8)	19.0 (66.2)	18.3 (64.9)	18.3 (64.9)	17.8 (64.0)	15.2 (59.4)	12.0 (53.6)	9.7 (49.5)	14.6 (58.3)
Record low °C (°F)	−3.8 (25.2)	−5.0 (23.0)	−1.0 (30.2)	1.0 (33.8)	8.4 (47.1)	11.0 (51.8)	10.5 (50.9)	10.7 (51.3)	6.0 (42.8)	0.0 (32.0)	−1.9 (28.6)	−5.0 (23.0)	−5.0 (23.0)
Average precipitation mm (inches)	12.5 (0.49)	10.0 (0.39)	9.8 (0.39)	32.0 (1.26)	36.6 (1.44)	85.2 (3.35)	87.2 (3.43)	71.4 (2.81)	96.1 (3.78)	48.2 (1.90)	14.4 (0.57)	10.9 (0.43)	514.3 (20.25)
Average precipitation days (≥ 0.1 mm)	3.9	2.9	2.9	4.0	6.2	9.1	10.1	9.4	12.2	8.0	4.3	3.8	76.8
Average relative humidity (%)	69.7	67.1	61.4	60.8	66.3	68.5	71.7	69.5	74.8	75.7	73.1	70.6	69.1
Mean monthly sunshine hours	153.5	167.2	226.0	209.0	235.8	231.9	213.7	225.2	175.5	179.1	172.0	143.0	2,332
Source 1: Servicio Meteorológico Nacional
Source 2: World Meteorological Organization (relative humidity and sun 1981–2010)
