= 3rd federal electoral district of San Luis Potosí =

Federal electoral district of Mexico

San Luis Potosí's 3rd
- Electoral district of the Chamber of Deputies of Mexico

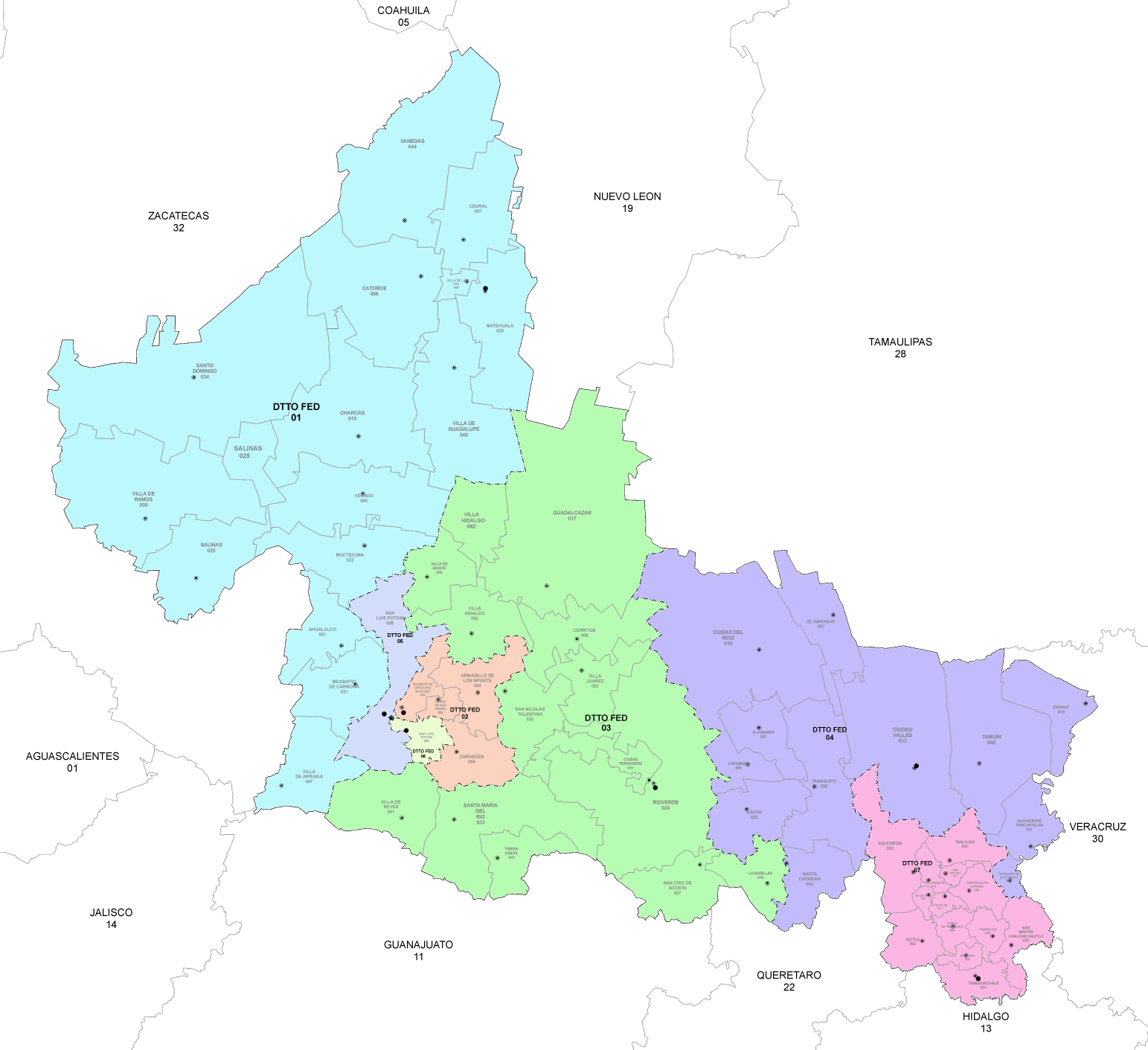
- 3rd district since 2023

Incumbent
- Member: Óscar Bautista Villegas
- Party: ▌Ecologist Green Party of Mexico
- Congress: 66th (2024–2027)

District
- State: San Luis Potosí
- Head town: Rioverde
- Coordinates: 21°56′N 100°00′W
- Covers: 13 municipalities: Cerritos, Ciudad Fernández, Guadalcázar, Lagunillas, Rioverde, San Ciro de Acosta, San Nicolás Tolentino, Santa María del Río, Tierra Nueva, Villa de Arista, Villa de Reyes, Villa Hidalgo, Villa Juárez
- PR region: Second
- Precincts: 335
- Population: 357,788 (2020 census)

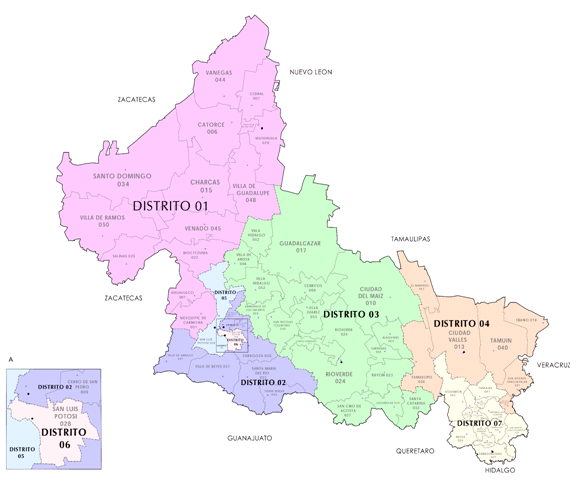
San Luis Potosí under the 2017–2022 scheme

The 3rd federal electoral district of San Luis Potosí (Spanish: Distrito electoral federal 03 de San Luis Potosí) is one of the 300 electoral districts into which Mexico is divided for elections to the federal Chamber of Deputies and one of seven such districts in the state of San Luis Potosí.

It elects one deputy to the lower house of Congress for each three-year legislative session by means of the first-past-the-post system. Votes cast in the district also count towards the calculation of proportional representation ("plurinominal") deputies elected from the second region.

The current member for the district, elected in the 2024 general election, is Óscar Bautista Villegas of the Ecologist Green Party of Mexico (PVEM).

== District territory ==
Under the 2023 districting plan adopted by the National Electoral Institute (INE), which is to be used for the 2024, 2027 and 2030 federal elections, the third district is situated in the central region of the state. It covers 335 electoral precincts (secciones electorales) across 13 of its municipalities:

- Cerritos, Ciudad Fernández, Guadalcázar, Lagunillas, Rioverde, San Ciro de Acosta, San Nicolás Tolentino, Santa María del Río, Tierra Nueva, Villa de Arista, Villa de Reyes, Villa Hidalgo and Villa Juárez.

The district's head town (cabecera distrital), where results from individual polling stations are gathered together and tallied, is the city of Rioverde. The district reported a population of 357,788 in the 2020 census.

== Previous districting schemes ==
Evolution of electoral district numbers
	1974	1978	1996	2005	2017	2023
San Luis Potosí	5	7	7	7	7	7
Chamber of Deputies	196	300				

2017–2022

Between 2017 and 2022, the district was in the state's central region but with a different composition. It covered 15 municipalities: Alaquines, Armadillo de los Infante, Cárdenas, Cerritos, Ciudad del Maíz, Ciudad Fernández, Guadalcázar, Lagunillas, Rioverde, San Ciro de Acosta, San Nicolás Tolentino, Santa Catarina, Villa de Arista, Villa Hidalgo and Villa Juarez. The head town was at Rioverde.

2005–2017

Under the 2005 plan, with its head town at Rioverde, the district covered 14 municipalities: Alaquines, Cárdenas, Cerritos, Ciudad del Maíz, Ciudad Fernández, Guadalcázar, Lagunillas, Rayón, Rioverde, San Ciro de Acosta, San Nicolás Tolentino, Villa de Arista, Villa Hidalgo and Villa Juárez.

1996–2005

From 1995 to 2005, the district had its head town at Rioverde and comprised 13 municipalities: Alaquines, Cárdenas, Cerritos, Ciudad del Maíz, Ciudad Fernández, Lagunillas, Rayón, Rioverde, San Ciro de Acosta, San Nicolás Tolentino, Santa Catarina, Tamasopo and Villa Juárez.

1978–1996

The districting scheme in force from 1978 to 1996 was the result of the 1977 electoral reforms, which increased the number of single-member seats in the Chamber of Deputies from 196 to 300. Under that plan, San Luis Potosí's seat allocation rose from five to seven. The third district's head town was at Rioverde and it covered the municipalities of Ciudad Fernández, Mexquitic, Rioverde, San Nicolás Tolentino, Santa María del Río, Tierra Nueva, Villa de Arriaga, Villa de Reyes and Zaragoza.

== Deputies returned to Congress ==
(Mexico) National parties
- Current
- PAN
- PRI
- PT
- PVEM
- MC
- Morena
- PAZ
- Somos
- Defunct or local only
- PLM
- PNR
- PRM
- PNM
- PP
- PPS
- PARM
- PFCRN
- CON
- PANAL
- PSD
- PES
- PES
- PRD

San Luis Potosí's 3rd district
Election	Deputy	Party	Term	Legislature
1916	Rafael Cepeda; Rafael Martínez Mendoza		1916–1917	Constituent Congress of Querétaro
...
1976	Víctor Alfonso Maldonado Moreleón	Institutional Revolutionary Party	1976–1979	50th Congress
1979	José Refugio Araujo del Ángel	Institutional Revolutionary Party	1979–1982	51st Congress
1982	Odilón Martínez Rodríguez	Institutional Revolutionary Party	1982–1985	52nd Congress
1985	Antonio Sandoval González	Institutional Revolutionary Party	1985–1988	53rd Congress
1988	Emilio de Jesús Ramírez Guerrero	Institutional Revolutionary Party	1988–1991	54th Congress
1991	Jorge Vinicio Mejía Tobías	Institutional Revolutionary Party	1991–1994	55th Congress
1994	Vito Lucas Gómez Hernández	Institutional Revolutionary Party	1994–1997	56th Congress
1997	Adoración Martínez Torres	Institutional Revolutionary Party	1997–2000	57th Congress
2000	José Luis Ugalde Montes	Institutional Revolutionary Party	2000–2003	58th Congress
2003	José Luis Briones Briseño (Note: Briones Briseño sat as an independent after 16 March 2006.)	Institutional Revolutionary Party Independent politician	2003–2006	59th Congress
2006	Enrique Rodríguez Uresti	National Action Party (Mexico)	2006–2009	60th Congress
2009	Sergio Gama Dufour	National Action Party (Mexico)	2009–2012	61st Congress
2012	Óscar Bautista Villegas	Institutional Revolutionary Party	2012–2015	62nd Congress
2015	Fabiola Guerrero Aguilar	Institutional Revolutionary Party	2015–2018	63rd Congress
2018	Óscar Bautista Villegas (Note: Elected for a PRI-PVEM-PANAL coalition, Bautista Villegas switched allegiance in Congress from the PVEM to the PRI on 8 September 2020.)	Ecologist Green Party of Mexico Institutional Revolutionary Party	2018–2021	64th Congress
2021	Kevin Ángelo Aguilar Piña	Ecologist Green Party of Mexico	2021–2024	65th Congress
2024	Óscar Bautista Villegas	Ecologist Green Party of Mexico	2024–2027	66th Congress

== Presidential elections ==
San Luis Potosí's 3rd district
Election	District won by	Party or coalition	%
2018	Andrés Manuel López Obrador	Juntos Haremos Historia	35.9965
2024	Claudia Sheinbaum Pardo	Sigamos Haciendo Historia	64.0779
