= Jorge Terán Juárez =

Mexican politician

- Born: 18 February 1959 (age 67); Ciudad Valles, San Luis Potosí, Mexico
- Occupation: Politician
- Political party: PRI

Jorge Terán Juárez (born 18 February 1959) is a Mexican politician affiliated with the Institutional Revolutionary Party (PRI). In the 2012 general election he was elected to the Chamber of Deputies to represent San Luis Potosí's 4th district during the 62nd session of Congress.

Preceded by Juan José Ortíz Azuara	Municipal President of Valles, San Luis Potosí; 2003–2006; 2015–2018	Succeeded by Rómulo Garza Martínez; Adrián Esper Cárdenas
