= José Luis Briones Briseño =

Mexican politician

- Born: 25 February 1963 (age 63); Ciudad Fernández, San Luis Potosí, Mexico
- Occupation: Politician
- Political party: PANAL

José Luis Briones Briseño (born 25 February 1963) is a Mexican politician affiliated with the New Alliance Party. In the 2003 mid-terms he was elected to the Chamber of Deputies to represent San Luis Potosí's 3rd district during the 59th session of Congress. After 16 March 2006 he sat as an independent.
