= Uresti =

Uresti is a surname. Notable people with the surname include:

- Carlos Uresti (born 1963), American attorney and politician
- Enrique Rodríguez Uresti (born 1962), Mexican politician
- Félix Uresti Gómez (1887-1923), Mexican general
- Omar Uresti (born 1968), American golfer
- Tomas Uresti, American politician
