= Sergio Gama Dufour =

Mexican politician

- Born: 27 June 1966 (age 59); Rioverde, San Luis Potosí, Mexico
- Occupation: Politician
- Political party: PAN

Sergio Gama Dufour (born 27 June 1966) is a Mexican politician from the National Action Party (PAN). In the 2009 mid-terms he was elected to the Chamber of Deputies to represent San Luis Potosí's 3rd district during the 61st session of Congress.
