= Agua Puerca =

Coordinates: 21.4053°N 98.9350°W

Agua Puerca is a small village in the Mexican state of San Luis Potosí, in the municipality of Tamasopo. It is located in the mountains of the La Huasteca/Pame-Chichimeca region, about 40 miles (64 km) west of Ciudad Valles and 130 miles (210 km) west of the port of Tampico, Tamaulipas.

Agua Puerca has a population of about 500 people. Its name means "Dirty water," because the water used to be so poor in quality. The town only got electricity in March 2005, and has yet to get running water. When the well in the town is full, people are able to get all of their water from there. When it is dry, however, they must walk over an hour away to get water. The NGO Tools for Development has been assisting the people of the town in many ways, organizing Humanitarian Brigades and the like.
