= María Marcos Cedillo Salas =

First Mexican female pilot

- Born: 1910; Ciudad del Maíz, San Luis Potosí
- Died: 6 June 1933 (aged 22–23); San Luis Potosí
- Cause of death: Aeroplane crash
- Occupation: Pilot

María Marcos Cedillo Salas (April 1910 - 6 June 1933) was the first female pilot in Mexico.

== Biography ==
María Marcos Cedillo Salas was born in April 1910 in Rancho Palomas, in Ciudad de Maíz in the state of San Luis Potosí to María Concepción Salas and Homobono Cedillo.

Her paternal uncle was the politician and general Saturnino Cedillo,who served as governor of the state of San Luis Potosí from 1927 to 1931 through the Partido Nacional Revolucionario. Her father's family was involved in political and military activity around the Mexican Revolution (1910-1920) and the Cristero War (1926 – 1929), and several uncles and aunts were killed or imprisoned for their parts in the struggle.

Details about her early life are sketchy, but family memories suggest she was adventurous and liked cars and planes.

== Career as a pilot ==
María Marcos Cedillo Salas was inspired to become a pilot by the American Florence Lowe “Pancho” Barnes, the first woman to pilot herself into the state of San Luis Potosí in 1930. Maria Marcos Cedillo Salas joined the first Civil Aviation School in San Luis Potosí, founded by her uncle, governor Saturnino Cedillo. This was against the wishes of her relatives who considered it too dangerous. She was one of the earliest pupils.

She owned a 549K biplane, designed by the leading aviation engineers in Mexico, Mexican Guillermo Villasana López and Italian Francisco Santarini Tognoli who ran the Talleres Nacionales de Construcciones Aeronáuticas, the national workshop for aeronautical construction.

She named the plane "Ángel del Infierno" (Angel of Hell) after her uncle Saturnino's description of planes as "those machines from hell". He disliked aircraft, despite his having set up the aviation school. She personally painted the name on both sides of the plane.

She was soon flying long distances on the established civilian air routes 7 and 8, between San Luis-Zacatecas-Torreón and San Luis-León-Guadalajara, respectively.

== Death ==
On the morning of 6 June 1933, María Marcos took off in her plane accompanied by her student and mechanic, José Ramírez, to perform aerial stunts. Within minutes, during the "Barrena" (spin) maneuver, her plane plummeted out of control and hit the Los Valentinos hill, killing both pilot and passenger.

General Saturnino Cedillo later went to the scene and fired all the bullets from his pistol at the remains of the plane that he blamed for taking the life of his niece María, who he had cared for since the death of her father.

María Marcos Cedillo Salas was laid to rest in the Pantheon of Saucito (Panteón del Saucito).

She is commemorated by a monument on the site where her plane crashed on Calle Técnica 144, in the university area.

Members of her family gather at the monument every year on 6 June to remember her.
