= Luis Oscar Jiménez Herrera =

Mexican serial killer

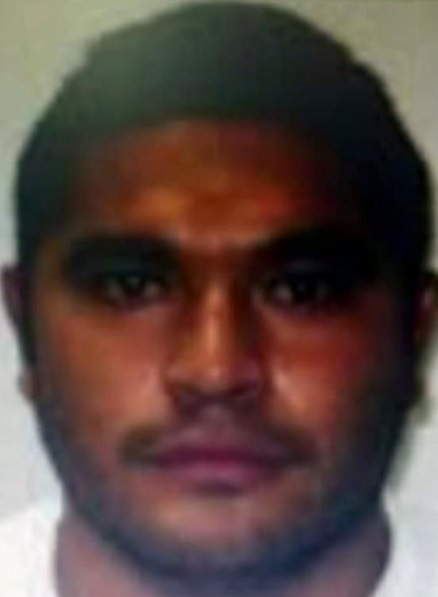
- Mugshot
- Born: 1983 (age 42–43); Durango City, Durango, Mexico
- Other name: "The Tinaco Killer"
- Conviction: Murder
- Penalty: 128 years imprisonment

Details
- Victims: 16–17
- Span of crimes: 2013 – 2016 possibly starting in 2010
- Country: Mexico
- States: Nuevo León and possibly San Luis Potosí
- Date apprehended: 2016

Luis Oscar Jiménez Herrera (born 1983), The Tinaco Killer, is a Mexican serial killer who killed at least 16 women between 2013 and 2016 in the state of Nuevo León. In 2018, he was sentenced to 123 years imprisonment.

== Background ==
Luis Oscar Jiménez was born in Durango City, within a dysfunctional family in which his father mistreated his mother. Growing up, he developed a deep contempt for women. According to unofficial sources, he has been the victim of sexual abuse in his childhood. Jiménez also served in the Mexican Army, and by the time of his arrest he already had a criminal record for minor crimes in Tamaulipas.

== Crimes ==
=== Murder of María Atino García ===
On October 30, 2010, in Ciudad Valles, San Luis Potosí, the body of 29-year-old María Atino García Martínez, from Aquismón, was found inside an empty tinaco (Note: In Mexico, a tinaco is a rooftop water storage tank.) on the roof of a furniture store, apparently strangled to the point where her cervical vertebrae had been broken. At that time, Jiménez was arrested and proposed as a suspect in her murder. He was on vacation with a woman named Gloria Martínez, who allegedly was his wife, and they were staying at the Hotel San Cosmé. Martínez claimed that on the night of October 29, Jiménez had met García and arranged to have sex in exchange for money; he later confessed to sleeping with, but not killing her. According to the statements of the hotel receptionist, the victim had left the hotel that night. Jiménez ended up being released.

=== Serial murders ===
The rest of the murders attributed to Jiménez began in 2013, in Nuevo León. His modus operandi consisted of gaining the victim's trust, after which he would take them to hotels where they would have sex. When they wanted to leave, Jiménez would become enraged and assaulted them, first hitting the women to incapacitate and subsequently strangle them.

His last known victim was a 46-year-old woman named Rosa Griselda Alvarado Flores, a resident of Apodaca. Alvarado's body was found handcuffed in downtown Monterrey, on May 6, 2016, with bruises on the face. According to Jiménez's statements, she had charged him with 200 pesos for sex and were together for about an hour. When she decided that she wanted to leave, they began arguing and he began beating Alvarado until she was unconscious, strangling her to death afterwards. Once dead, he tied her hands and feet.

== See also ==
- List of serial killers by country
