= Delia Guerrero Coronado =

Mexican politician

- Born: 1 June 1959 (age 66); San Luis Potosí, Mexico
- Occupation: Politician
- Political party: Institutional Revolutionary Party

Delia Guerrero Coronado (born 1 June 1959) is a Mexican politician from the Institutional Revolutionary Party (PRI). She served as a federal deputy to the 63rd Congress representing San Luis Potosí and the second electoral region.

== Life ==
Guerrero Coronado obtained degrees in nursing and teaching, along with a specialized degree in pediatric nursing. From 1980 to 1990, she supervised nurses in the ISSSTE, and between 1990 and 2009, she was the head of nurses at the General Hospital of Ciudad Valles. During this time, she also obtained a graduate degree in nursing and a specialty degree in Administration of Nursing Services.

Her involvement in PRI politics began in earnest in 2003, when she was elected as a town councilor in Ciudad Valles for a three-year term. She also coordinated the National Fair of the Huasteca Potosina, held in Ciudad Valles, from 2004 to 2005.

After a time in which she worked in various PRI positions and was a municipal-level coordinator in the early stages of the PRI's San Luis Potosí gubernatorial campaign, Guerrero ran for and won a seat in the federal Chamber of Deputies from the Fourth Federal Electoral District of San Luis Potosí, centered on Ciudad Valles. In the 61st Congress, she sat on the commissions dealing with Attention to Vulnerable Groups, Health, and Cooperative Development and Social Economy; she also headed the PRI delegation of deputies from San Luis Potosí. Simultaneously, she served as a national political councilor within the PRI and became the national Secretary of Women's Action in the Confederación Nacional Campesina.

From 2012 to 2015, Guerrero Coronado served in the local legislature as a deputy to the 60th session of the Congress of San Luis Potosí, where she was the vice president of the State Finances and Oversight Commissions and also sat on those dealing with Health and Social Aid, as well as Communications and Transportation. In 2015, she was a precandidate for the municipal presidency of Ciudad Valles, but the PRI opted to select another candidate.

Guerrero returned to San Lázaro when the PRI selected her to be on its party list from the second electoral region, at the suggestion of CNC head Manuel Cota Jiménez, and obtained enough votes to send her back to the Chamber of Deputies. In the 63rd Congress, Guerrero Coronado was a secretary on the Committee for the Center of Studies for Sustainable Rural Development and Food Sovereignty, as well as commissions on Transparency and Anticorruption; Health; and Social Security.
