= Casas de los Sánchez-Ochando =

Houses of the Sánchez-Ochando
- Casa del Conde
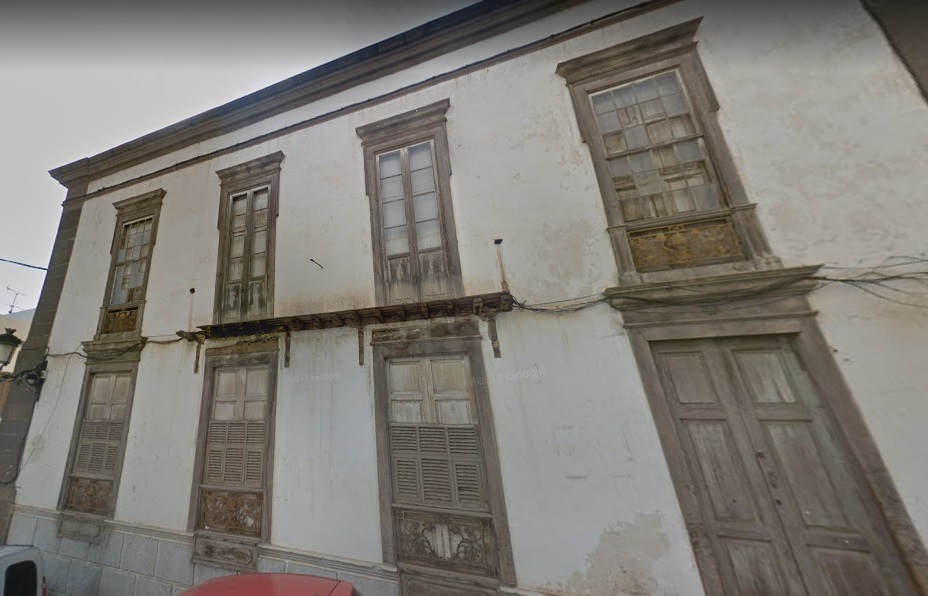
- Interactive map of the Houses of the Sánchez-Ochando area

General information
- Architectural style: Mudejar and neoclassical
- Location: Santa Maria de Guia de Gran Canaria, Canary Islands
- Coordinates: 28.139132376405072°N 15.633185505867003°W
- Construction started: 1600; 426 years ago
- Completed: 1600; 426 years ago

Casas de los Sánchez-Ochando (English: Sánchez-Ochando's houses) are a group of houses in the municipality of Santa María de Guía de Gran Canaria. They exemplify vernacular architecture, the traditional domestic architectural style of the "well-to-do class" of the Canary Islands. Two specimens remain.

== History ==
In the early 19th century, the land was owned by Alonso Riverol's family. Two centuries later, the land was passed to the Sánchez-Ochando family.

The land spread across family members via inheritance. Some became the property of Juan del Castillo Westherling, who was then Count of the Vega Grande de Guadalupe. The set was colloquially known as 'Casa del Conde' (English: House of the Count).

The houses were known and highlighted in the Historic Set of the City of Guía, because of how they remained assets of one family, the proximity of the buildings, and as a representation of two models of stately homes from the 17th century. The surnames of its inhabitants included Vetancourt, Riverol, Merino, Falcón, Aríñez and Bilbao.

The house that closes the alley barracks was started in the 17th century. Its facade presents the characteristic typology of manor houses of Gran Canaria, in which a stone frame joins the main door with a window located, with windowsill and cornice as decoration. It typically has four drainpipes.

The front of the house is covered with a four-sided roof, while a wide gallery balustrade supported by jabalcones is visible from the Las Huertas area.

This building has testimonial value to a past mode of construction, but it is abandoned. The quarry frame has been painted the same color as the cloth of the facade, an aesthetic decision that doesn't reflect traditional construction. In addition, in 2019 a bank of contemporary architectural style was built in front of the house, which contributes to the loss of the place's cultural context.

=== Marqués del Muni street house ===
This house gives Casa Condal the nickname to the whole. When cornering, the typological contrast between the secondary facade facing the west (with a wide wall whose only decoration is two rows of windows and the frontis that obeys the neoclassical taste of the openings perfectly arranged in their placement, as well as in the stonework frames that surround them and the elegant cornice that crowns the building on its side of the old street of La Cruz.

A striking forged blacksmith shop, with classic vegetal and faunal decoration, is located in the railings of its six windows and on the balcony.

Like the previous house, it is in deteriorated condition. E.g., the wide balcony has completely disappeared.

== Gallery ==
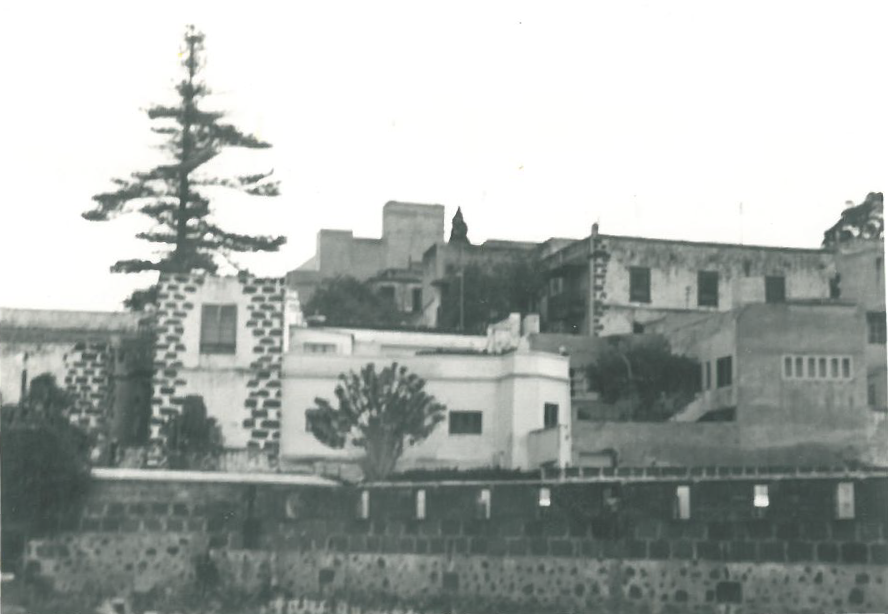
Casa del Conde in 1980.

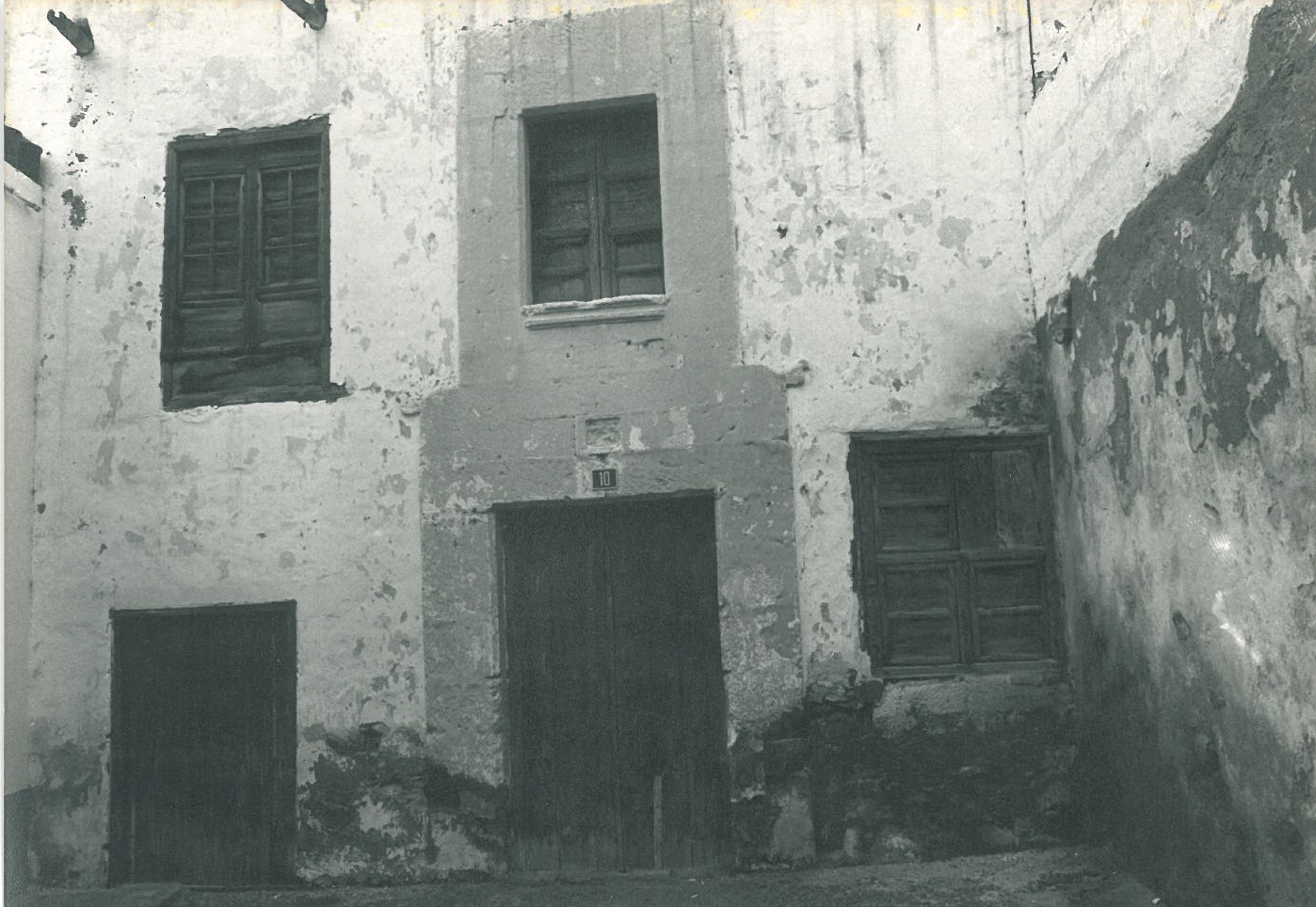
Facade of the Casa del Conde in 1981.

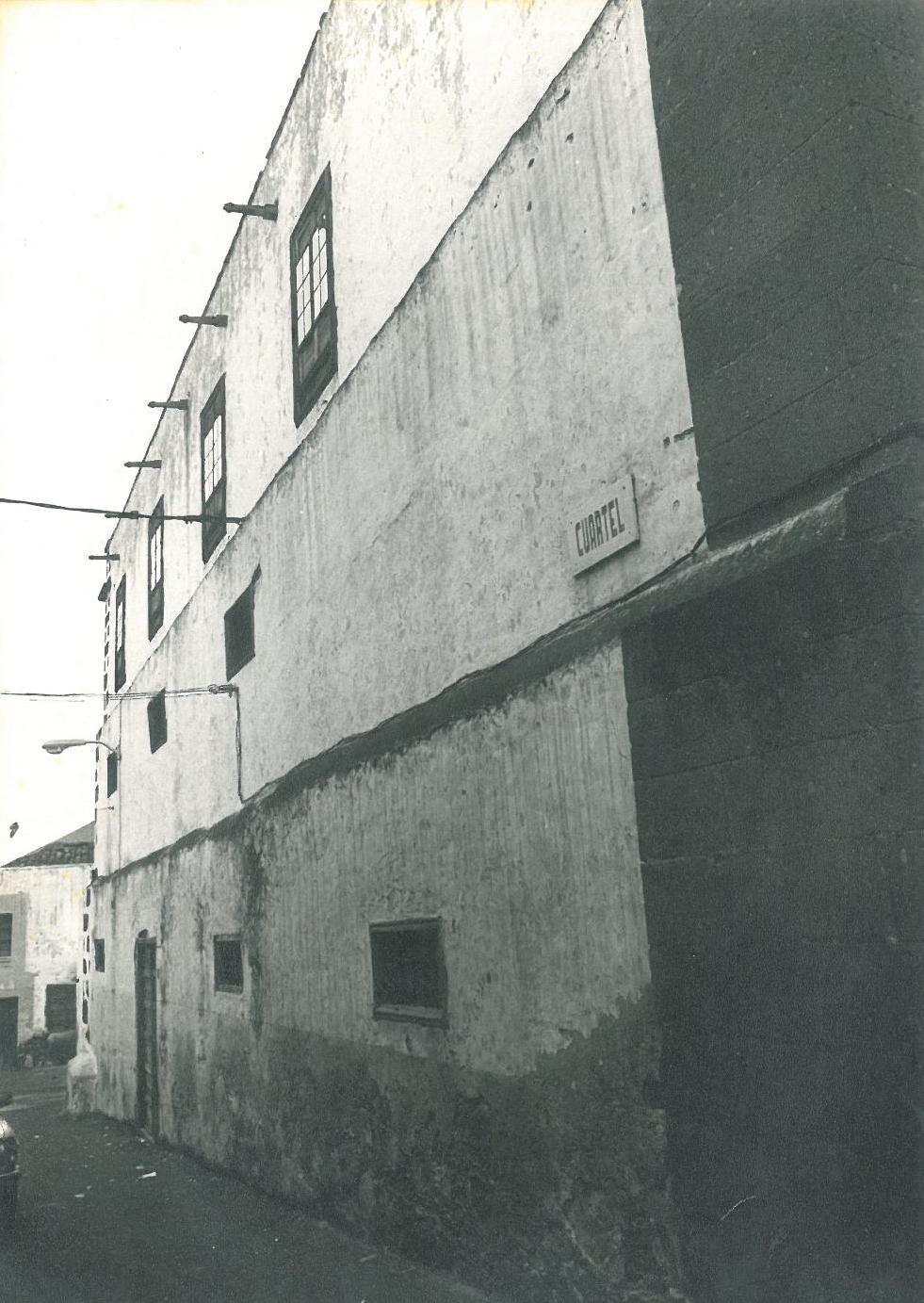
Lateral Casa del Conde in 1981.

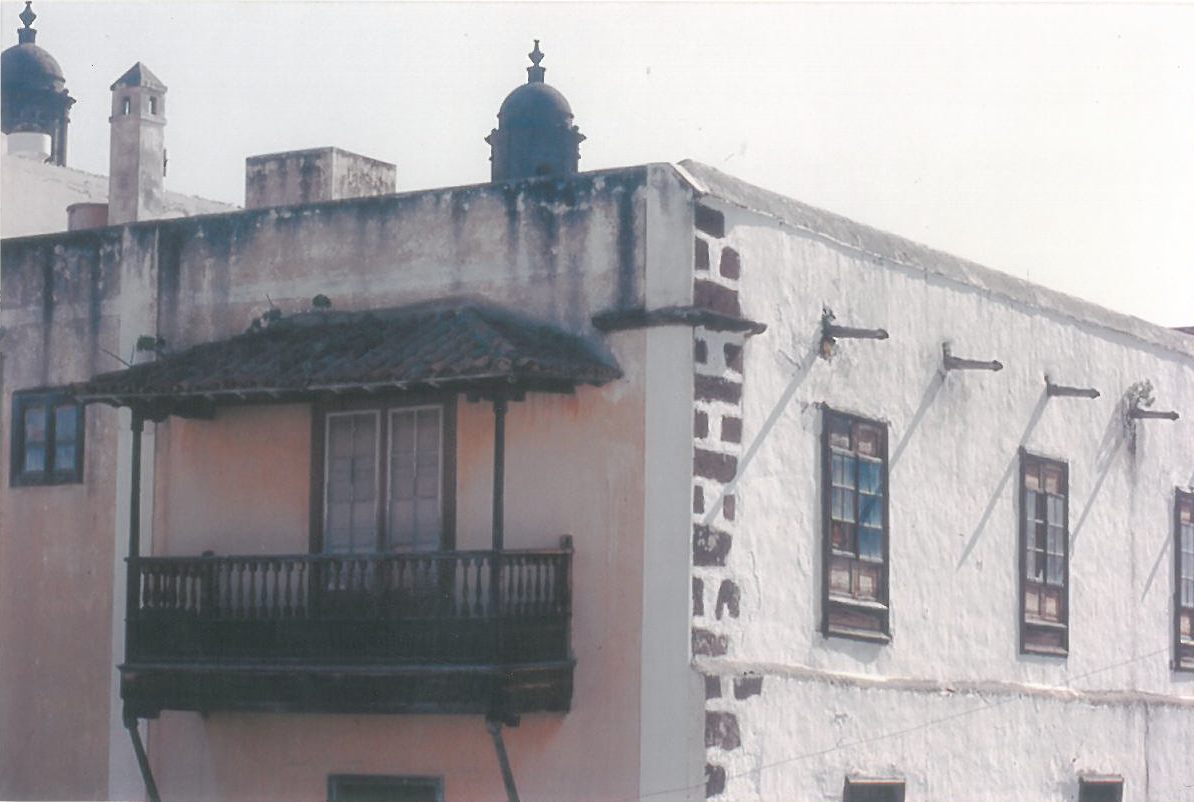
Casa del Conde in 2001.

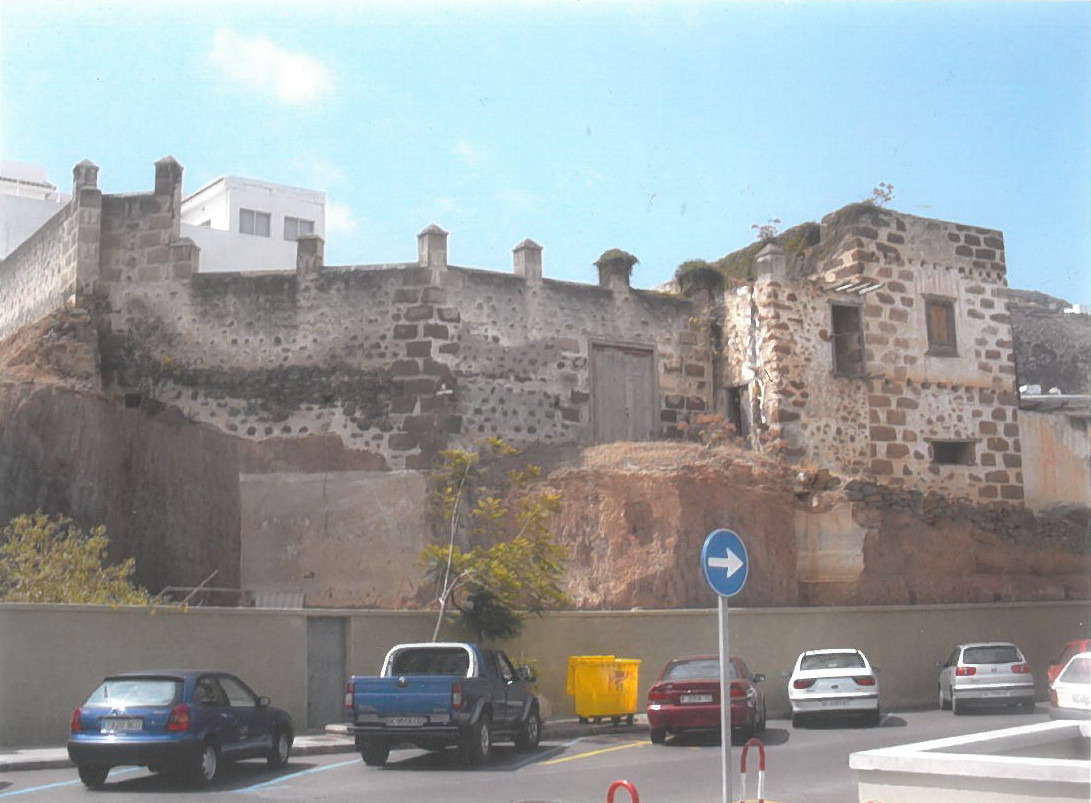
Rear of Casa del Conde in 2001.

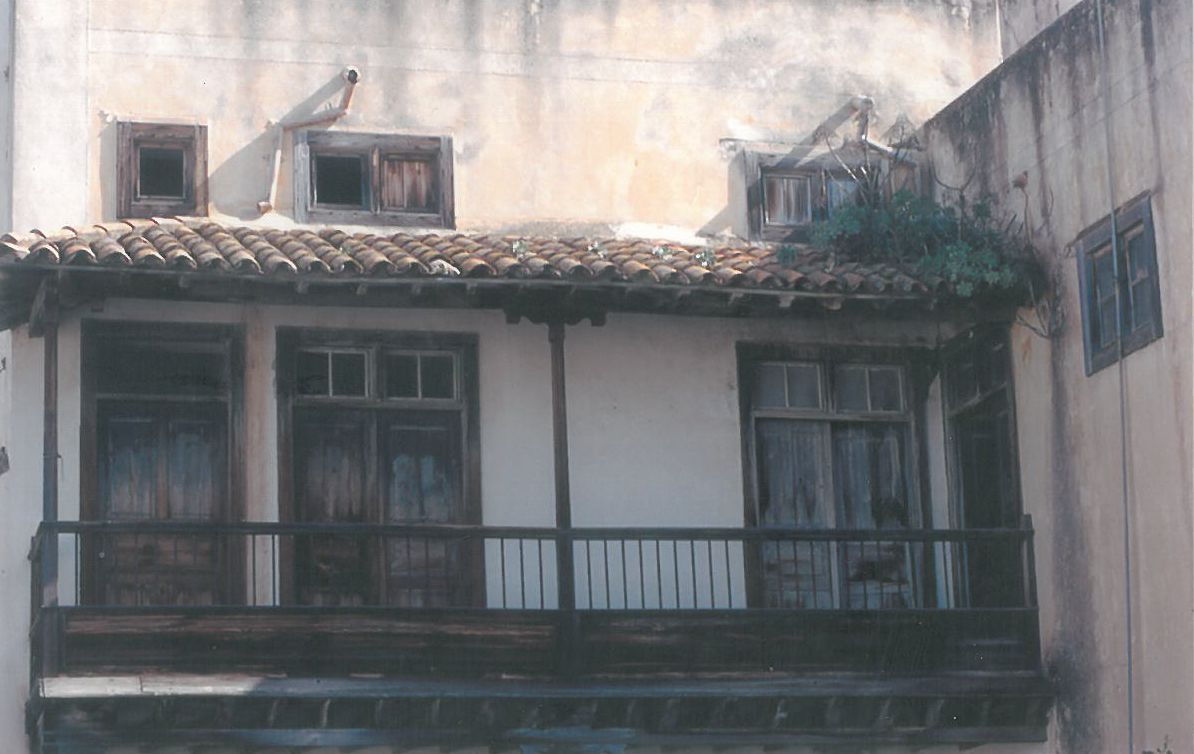
Balcony of the Casa del Conde in 2001

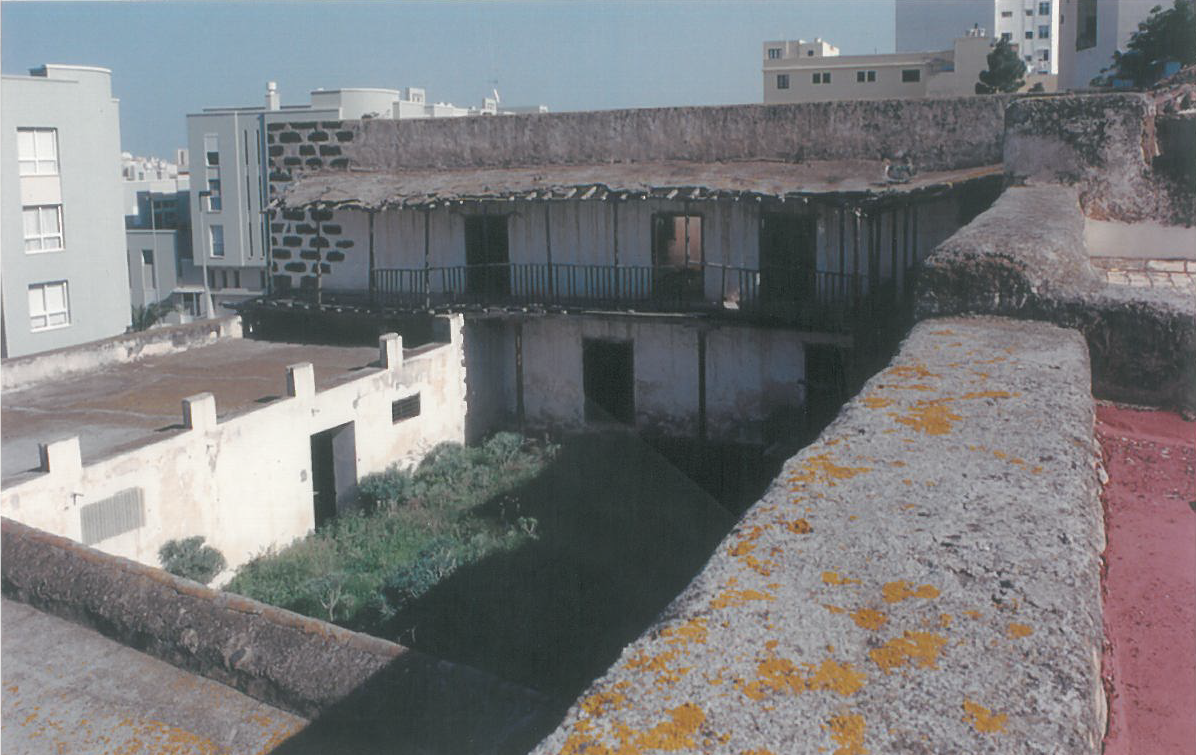
Balcony of the Casa del Conde in 2001
