= Mesoamerican Epiclassic Period =

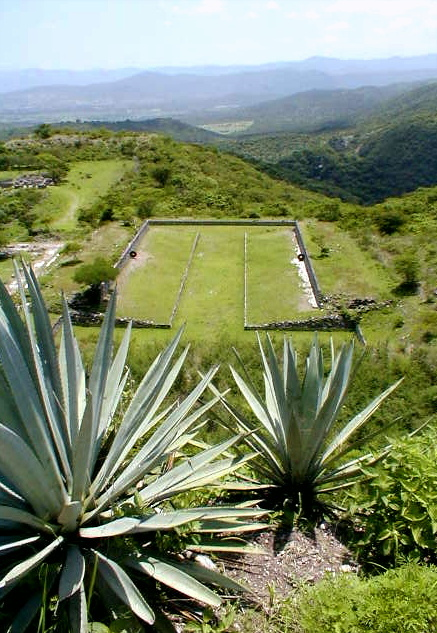
Ball game in Xochicalco, Morelos, one of the most developed Epiclassic urban centers.

The Mesoamerican Epiclassic Period, Epiclassic or Late Classic is the period comprising the years between 650 and 850 C. E., compromising the transition between the decline of Teotihuacán and the Chichimeca migrations to the central Altiplano, with the subsequent formation of Postclassic societies.

The collapse of Teotihuacán and its political, economic, and cultural systems was a core event that impacted the majority of Mesoamerica, disrupting centuries of political stability and creating hostile and unstable societies previously controlled directly or indirectly by Teotihuacan and with conflicts among themselves, which created important urban centers with regional dominance such as Cholula, Xochicalco, Tula Chico, Cacaxtla-Xochitécatl, Teotenango, Cantona, and Teotihuacán itself.

Additionally, although not traditionally considered part of the Epiclassic due to their distance and relative ethnic diversity, the political processes of Central Altiplano, Paquimé, La Quemada, Chapiteles, and Ferrería in the north, Teuchitlán and Cañada de la Virgen in the west, and Tamtoc and Tajín on the Gulf Coast were influenced by the Epiclassic period.

== General characteristics of the Epiclassic ==
The disintegration of the Teotihuacan system disrupted many political orders, resulting in generalized instability in the political, economic and cultural hegemony that it exercised over a good number of Classic societies, causing strong demographic movements that gave rise to multiple regional power centers that controlled smaller political units.

Said fragmentation had a profound impact on Mesoamerican societies, which is evident in the architectural changes towards fortified sites and potentially defensive areas such as mountains that allowed a complete view of the valley where they settled, such as Xochicalco. The use of war iconography began. The middle Epiclassic period created powerful regional societies that continued many patterns established in the Classic and reinforced in the Postclassic. The priestly power exercised until then was gradually replaced by military elites.

In this period, Coyotlatelco-type ceramics were disseminated and produced extensively.

== The term Epiclassic ==
In 1930, the researcher Wigberto Jiménez Moreno proposed highlighting the historical significance of the period after the fall of Teotihuacán, which, on the one hand, broke with the Classic tradition and configured the characteristics of post-classical societies, with the term Epiclassical replacing the one called until then. Late Classic, which had been unanimously accepted by Mesoamericanists as a period in the history of Mesoamerica with little historical clarity and political turbulence. Etymologically, the term comes from epi- (Greek: 'on', 'in') and -classical.
