= Cañada, Alaquines, San Luis Potosí =

La Cañada is a town located in the city of Alaquines, San Luis Potosi, Mexico.
