= Óscar Bautista Villegas =

Mexican politician

- Born: 6 February 1964 (age 62); Tantoyuca, Veracruz, Mexico
- Education: Linares Institute of Technology; UASLP
- Occupation: Politician
- Political party: PRI, PVEM

Óscar Bautista Villegas (born 6 February 1964) is a Mexican politician. He has been affiliated with both the Institutional Revolutionary Party (PRI) and the Ecologist Green Party of Mexico (PVEM).

Bautista Villegas was born in Tantoyuca, Veracruz, in 1964. From 2009 to 2012 he served as a local deputy in the Congress of San Luis Potosí.

He has been elected to the Chamber of Deputies for San Luis Potosí's 3rd district on three occasions: in the 2012 general election for the PRI, in the 2018 general election – sitting at first with the PVEM before switching to the PRI on 8 September 2020 – and for the PVEM in the 2024 general election.
