= Adrián Esper Cárdenas =

Mexican politician, communicator and businessman

Adrián Esper Cárdenas (born October 9, 1977) is a Mexican politician, communicator and businessman. He was municipal president of Ciudad Valles from October 1, 2018, until February 17, 2021, when he requested a leave of absence from the town council to compete for the governorship of San Luis Potosí in the 2021 elections.

== Family and Education ==
Born in Ciudad Valles, San Luis Potosí, Esper comes from a family of businessmen and politicians. He is the son of Laura Cárdenas del Avellano, daughter of the former governor of Tamaulipas, Enrique Cárdenas González, and his father is the architect Alfonso Esper Bujaidar.

He graduated with a degree in communications from the University of San Diego in 1999, having completed his high school studies at the Irish Institute of Monterrey, and his primary studies at the Motolinia Institute of Ciudad Valles.

== Political career ==
He had his beginnings in politics in 2000, with an environmental association called Viva la Huasteca. Since October 1, 2018, he has held the position of Municipal President of Ciudad Valles, following his victory in the 2018 San Luis Potosí elections.

During the visit of Mexican President Andrés Manuel López Obrador on March 31, 2019, Esper proposed to him to build the Huasteco Airport, to connect the Huasteca Potosina with large cities and thus attract tourism to the region, a project that was accepted by the president.

== Controversies ==
In November 2019, Adrián Esper Cárdenas caused a stir in the media due to the decision to purchase 15 Tesla Cybertrucks for patrolling, garbage collection, and water supply without first consulting or surveying the population about this decision.
