= José Manuel García Guevara =

Jose Manuel García Guevara
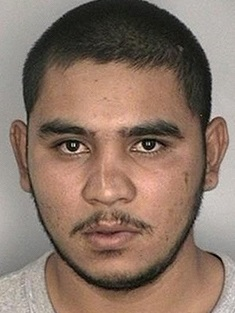

FBI Ten Most Wanted Fugitive
- Charges: Second degree murder, aggravated rape, aggravated burglary, Unlawful Flight to Avoid Prosecution
- Alias: Pelón

Description
- Born: February 11, 1988 (age 38); La Boquilla, Rioverde, San Luis Potosí, Mexico
- Race: Hispanic
- Height: 5 ft 6 in (1.68 m) to 5 ft 8 in (1.73 m)
- Weight: 160 lb (73 kg; 11 st) to 180 lb (82 kg; 13 st)
- Occupation: Laborer

Status
- Convictions: Second degree murder, aggravated rape, aggravated burglary
- Penalty: Life imprisonment without the possibility of parole
- Added: June 17, 2013
- Surrendered: July 29, 2014
- Number: 499
- Surrendered

Jose Manuel García Guevara (born February 11, 1988) is a Mexican national formerly on the FBI Ten Most Wanted Fugitives list.

== Background ==
On February 19, 2008, while living with four roommates in a trailer park in Lake Charles, Louisiana, Guevara allegedly broke into the trailer of his neighbor, 26-year-old Wanda Barton, and raped and stabbed her to death in the presence of her 4-year-old stepson. He then bought a one-way bus ticket to Dallas, Texas, where he disappeared. Authorities believe he returned to Mexico, possibly to his hometown of Rioverde, San Luis Potosí.

Guevara is between 5'6" to 5'8", with brown eyes and dark hair. He weighs between 160 and 180 pounds. He has a tattoo of the letter "J" on his shoulder, and goes by the nickname Pelón, which translates to "bald head," but is also a slang word for penis.

Guevara was indicted by a grand jury in April 2008 on charges of second-degree murder, aggravated rape, and aggravated burglary. He is also charged with unlawful flight to avoid prosecution. There was a $100,000 reward offered by the FBI for his capture.

On July 30, 2014, the FBI and officials with the Calcasieu Parish Sheriff's Office announced that they had captured Guevara. He was extradited from Mexico and booked into the Calcasieu Parish jail.

On January 28, 2015 Guevara was convicted of aggravated burglary, aggravated rape and second degree murder.
