= José María de la Vega =

Mexican politician

- Born: 7 August 1939 (age 86)
- Occupation: Politician
- Political party: PAN

José María de la Vega Lárraga (born 7 August 1939) is a Mexican politician affiliated with the National Action Party (PAN). In the 2003 mid-terms he was elected to the Chamber of Deputies to represent San Luis Potosí's 4th district during the 59th session of Congress.
