= David Lara Compeán =

Mexican politician

- Born: 11 September 1965 (age 60); San Luis Potosí, Mexico
- Occupation: Politician
- Political party: PAN

David Lara Compeán (born 11 September 1965) is a Mexican politician from the National Action Party (PAN). In the 2006 general election he was elected to the Chamber of Deputies to represent San Luis Potosí's 4th district during the 60th session of Congress.
