= Cárdenas, San Luis Potosí =

Coordinates: 22.010°N 99.652°W

City of Cárdenas Ciudad de Cárdenas
- city
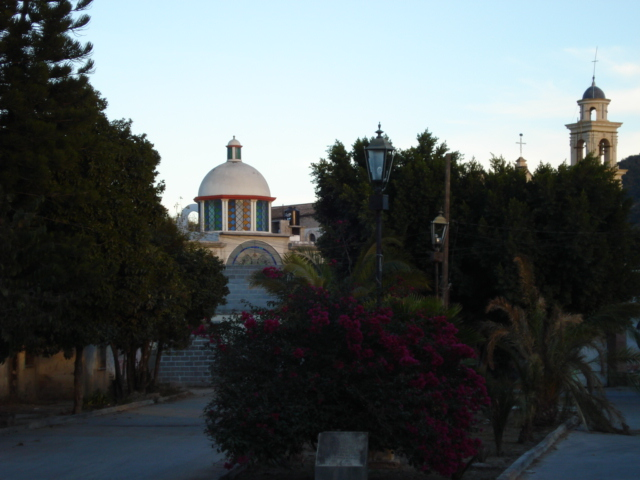
- Downtown Cárdenas
- Nickname: La ciudad del ferrocarril (The railway city)
- Interactive map of City of Cárdenas
- Country: Mexico
- State: San Luis Potosí
- Founded: 17th century

Government
  - Mayor: Pedro Alberto Tovar Gracia (PAN)
- Elevation: 1,200 m (3,900 ft)

Population (2005)
  - Total: 20,000
- Time zone: UTC-6 (Zona Centro)
- Postal code: 77000
- Website: www.cardenas-slp.gob.mx/

Cárdenas is a municipality and city in the Mexican state of San Luis Potosí.

The municipality is located east of the state capital in the Middle Zone, and it has the following coordinates: 99 ° 39 'W and 22 ° 00' north, with a height of 1.200 m above sea level. It is bordered to the north by Alaquines, to the east by Tamasopo, to the south by Rayon, and to the west by Río Verde, and it is 200 km away from the city of San Luis Potosí. With a population of about 20,000 inhabitants, it is the second largest city in the Middle Zone. it is 19 km away from the town of Alaquines, San Luis Potosí.

== History ==
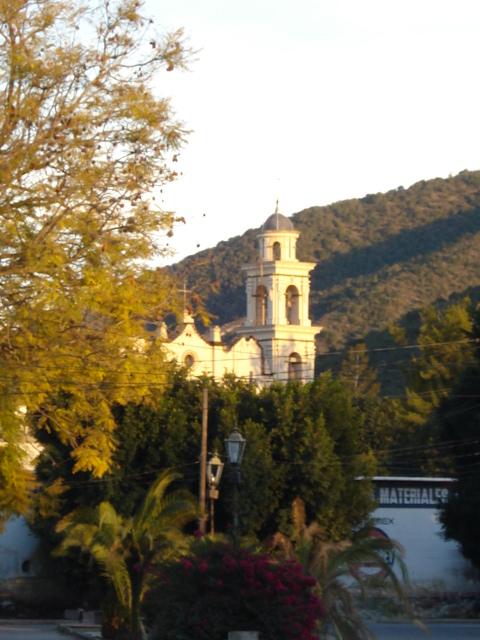
The church cupola

The first settlers were the friars, who occupied the ground in the first third of the seventeenth century. They occupied rancherías and farms, including the huge hacienda Ciénega de San Nicolás, allegedly founded by Luis de Cárdenas.

In those years it was referred to as the Ciénega de San Nicolás and later it came to be known as the Hacienda de Cárdenas after the surname of its owner.

=== Origin of the city ===
For more than a century it was owned by the Cárdenas family. Throughout that time and years later, there was a rise in its population among families of all castes, but most were Pames and few spoke Spanish. They were not concentrated in one locale but were dispersed among several rancherías, and one or two friars of the mission of Alaquines served in religious matters.

In the year 1761 the Ciénega hacienda was owned by Don Manuel Antonio Rojo del Río, Lafuente and Vieyra. When his property was confiscated and sold, it passed to the hands of Félix María Calleja and then Don Felipe Barragán. Upon the death of the latter, the property passed to the ownership of his daughters, Juana and Luisa Barragán.

When the Mexican War of Independence began, several armed conflicts are recorded as having occurred in the territory of the Cárdenas hacienda. In several combats are mentioned the royal forces commanded by don Cayetano Quintero and don Felipe de la Garza, and the guerilla insurgents of Desiderio Zárate.

=== The Railway in Cardenas ===
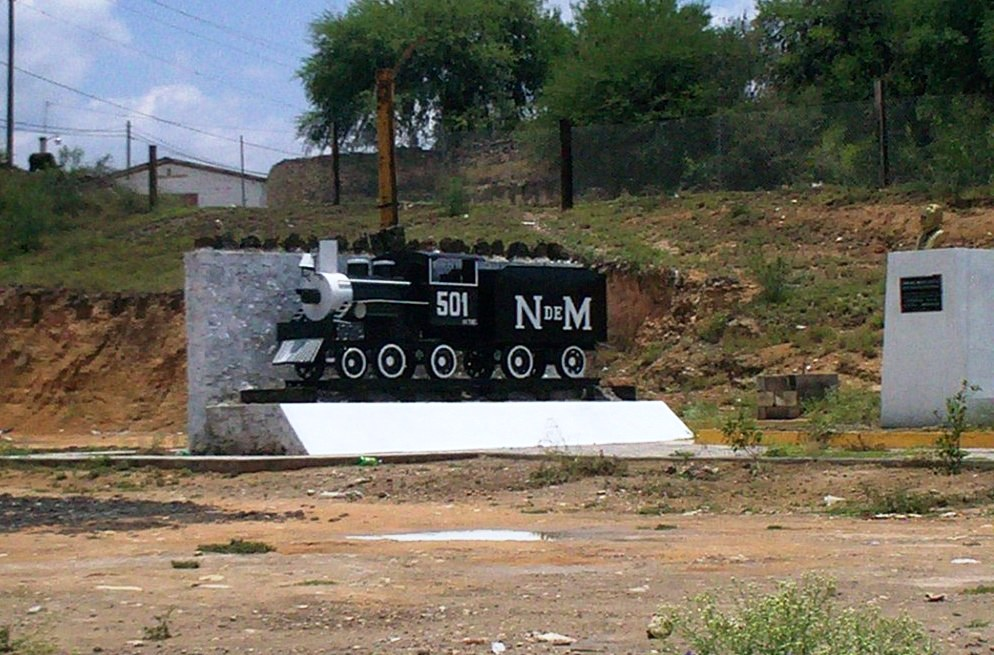

In 1881 began one of the projects that would form the municipality into one of the most modern in the state, the railway. This project would include the construction of rails from San Luis Potosí to Tampico; the work progressed slowly, both from San Luis Potosí and from Tampico. There were interruptions, unfulfilled contracts, insufficient funds, and court trouble.

In these works they had to overcome the difficulties presented by the laying of the road from Tamasopo to the Highlands, and they built several tunnels penetrating mountains. This bold work challenged the mountains, and the tracks finally found their way to present-day Cárdenas in La Labor, in April 1890.

From that time on, life in Cárdenas was totally transformed, and soon the workshops of the Cárdenas Division were installed. The population grew, the Rasconcito and Colonia Americana neighbourhoods were founded, and the economy was stimulated as a result of the influx of many families who came from Alaquines, Rayón, Lagunillas and other more distant locations. It was a euphoric time that overflowed with joy in all areas of the region. This situation lasted until 1910.

By the beginning of the year 1911, Cárdenas experienced one of the first revolutionary outbreaks led by Higinio Olivo, a native of La Labor and Juan Torres Pérez, who took up arms in El Corito. The forces of Pedro Montoya and brothers Juan and Victoriano Torres entered in 1911. In 1912 brothers Cedillo, Magdaleno, Saturnino, and Cleofas and began a series of violent acts in open rebellion against President Francisco I. Madero.

In 1914 the Cedillistas were in possession of Cárdenas. They established their headquarters there and committed all kinds of abuses. They seized the station, as well as the trains and cargo.

The most important battle in Cárdenas recorded during the Mexican Revolution took place on May 27, 1917. The square was defended by a garrison commanded by Colonel Fidel Garza and the first captains Ramón Hernández and Margarito Negrete when he was violently attacked by Cedillista forces. The fighting spread to the entire population, the attackers took the railway installations, burned the chapopote tank and the scale, and tried to burn down the station.

== Geography ==
=== Extension of Cárdenas ===
According to the Integrated System and Geographic Information Statistics INEGI, 2000, the total area of the municipality is 384.26 km2 and accounts for 0.63% of the state territory.

=== Orography ===
In the municipality are located mountainous formations such as the Sierra de Santa Gertrudis, Sierra Paredes, El Picacho, El Azafrán, Catana and El Grande.

=== Climate ===
The average annual rainfall is recorded as 616.6 mm (24.28 in), and most of the region is dominated by semi-arid and semi-warm weather in the west, semi-warm and subhumid weather in the centre, and semi-warm and humid weather with rain in the summer in the east. The average annual temperature is 26.9 °C, reaching a maximum in summer of 47 degrees Celsius and a minimum winter 5 degrees Celsius.

=== Cities Surrounding Cárdenas ===
- San Luis Potosi
- Alaquines
- Rioverde
- Ciudad Valles

== Mayors of Cárdenas ==
Mayors - Period of Government

- José García Ramos 1951-1952
- Melquiades Castillo. 1953-1955
- Felipe Castillo Vega. 1956-1958
- J. Trinidad García Ramos. 1959-1961
- René Castillo Vega. 1962-1964
- Enrique Palau Zuñiga. 1965-1967
- Carlos Guzmán. 1968-1970
- Jaime Rodríguez Lara. 1971-1973
- José López Rubio. 1974-1976
- Enrique Zubiaga Ramírez. 1977-1979
- René Castillo Vega. 1980-1982
- Ernesto Torres Alvarado. 1983-1985
- Indalecio Medina Calderón. 1986-1988
- Amonario Díaz de León. 1992-1994
- Arturo Hernández Maltus. 1995-1997
- Nicolás Torres Torres. 1997-2000
- Jaime Macías Oviedo 2000-2003
- Agustín Pérez Gómez 2004-2006
- José Luis Montaño Chávez 2006–Present

== Notable people ==
- E. Blas Rodriguez (1880-1949) Author of important studies on history, Huasteca archaeology, and legal studies.
- Jesus Maria Colunga (1845-1891) Received the priesthood in 1871 served in several parishes.
- Higinio Olivo (-1915) Carrancista revolutionary who joined the Cedillo forces, but in 1912 he was separated from joining other constitutionalist revolutionaries like Juan Barragán and Jesús Agustín Castro reaching the rank of colonel, was taken prisoner for being Villista, shot in March 1915.
- Miguel Ángel Herrera (1932-2006) Published his interesting book "Cárdenas My Memories." Friend of several newspapers and magazines. Partner of the Academia Histórica Potosina, author, Cárdenas Shield Officer. Chronicler of the National Association of Potosian Cardenenses. It won the Francisco Pena prize for history in November 1984.
- Idelfonso Turrubiartes (1890-1963) In 1911 joined the forces of the Cedillo brothers. After the Revolution was head of a Cologne Agricultural Military and in 1925 was promoted to Brigadier General. Governor of the State of San Luis Potosí between the years 1931 and 1935, and for his management was given autonomy of the University. He died on March 1.
- Fernando Z. Maldonado () Illustrious composer of this city, one of their most relevant and well known by all. Composed "Volver, Volver" which made the artist Vicente Fernández famous, as well as "Not Keep Crying", "Looks Like", "Love in the Street," and others. Killed along with his wife Eglatina Covarruvias at his home in Cuernavaca, Morelos.
- Marina Herrera Aragón "Marilú, la Muñequita que Canta" (born 18 July 1927), notable bolero singer and actress, active since the Golden Age of Mexican cinema. She has also performed on radio, stage, and television.
