= Las Huertas, Alaquines, San Luis Potosí =

Mexican town

Coordinates: 22.0414°N 99.5275°W

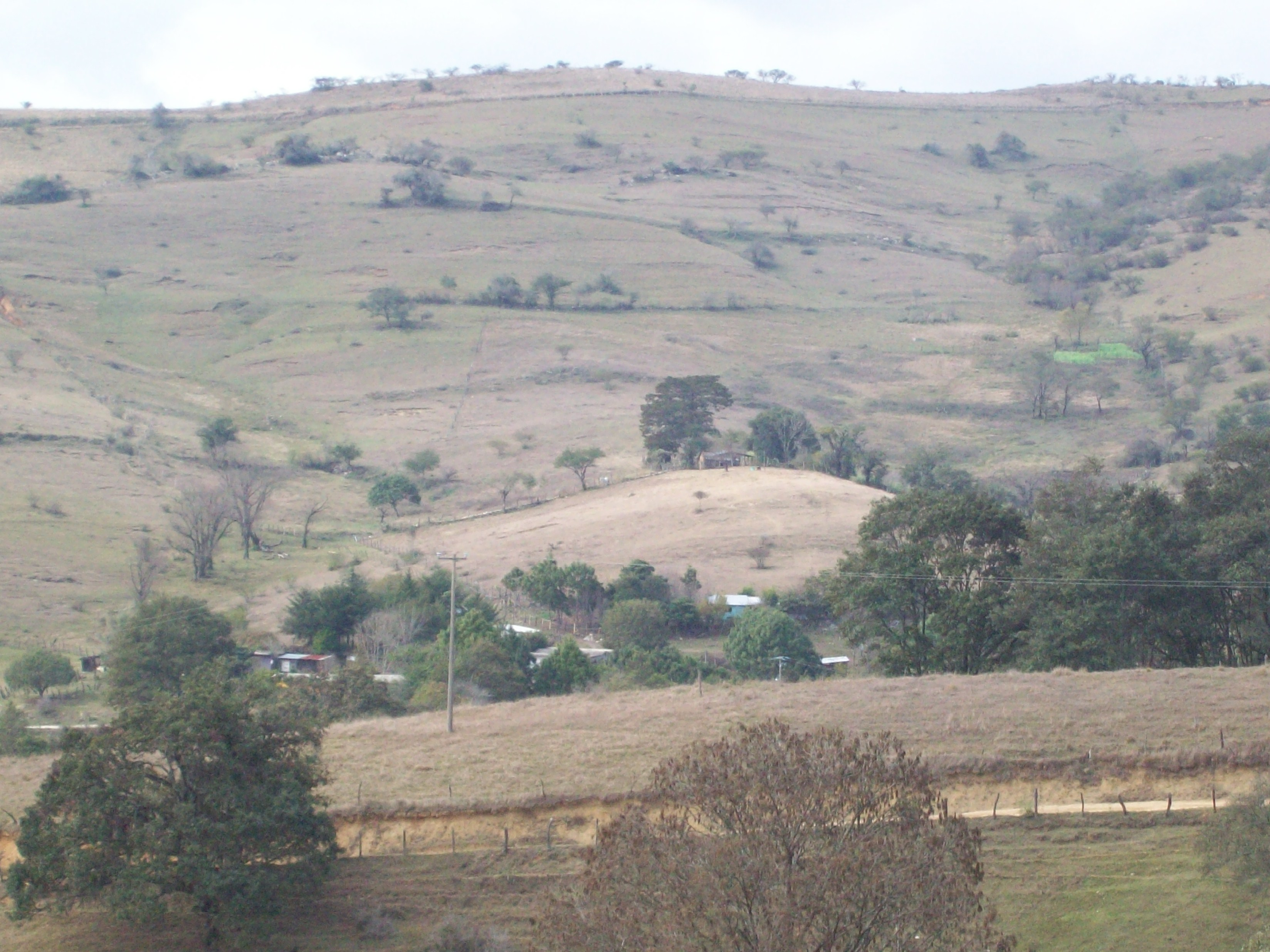
Las Huertas

Las Huertas is a town in the Municipality of Alaquines located in the Mexican state of San Luis Potosí, Mexico.
