= Enrique Rodríguez Uresti =

Mexican politician

- Born: 30 August 1962 (age 63); San Luis Potosí, Mexico
- Occupation: Politician
- Political party: PAN

Enrique Rodríguez Uresti (born 30 August 1962) is a Mexican politician from the National Action Party (PAN). In the 2006 general election he was elected to the Chamber of Deputies to represent San Luis Potosí's 3rd district during the 60th session of Congress.
