= Tamtoc =

Mexican archaeological site

Coordinates: 21.925°N 98.815°W

- Tamohí (Téenek for "place of the water clouds")
- Tamtok
- Interactive map of Tamtoc
- Location: Tamuín, San Luis Potosí, Mexico
- Part of: Huastec culture

History
- Built: c. 600 BC
- Abandoned: c. 1350 AD

Site notes
- Area: 210 hectares (520 acres)

Tamtoc, Tamtok or Tamohí (Téenek for "place of the water clouds") is an archaeological site of the Huastec culture, located in the municipality of Tamuín in the Mexican state of San Luis Potosí, in what is known today as the Huasteca region. Since 2000 it has been improved and recovered by a team of professionals, with the archaeologist Estela Martínez Mora in charge of the studies at the site.

Originally it was estimated that the flowering of this site took place between AD 900 and 1100, that is, during the Mesoamerican Postclassic Period, however recent findings - particularly Monument 32 - have led archaeologists to think that the flowering could have occurred in 600 BC during the Preclassic.

With an area of about 210 hectares, Tamtoc was one of the most important Huastecan urban centers of the last pre-Hispanic period due to its dimensions and characteristics. Its development lasted a few centuries before the Spanish arrived, until its sudden abandonment in the 16th century. It is located on the northeast bank of the Tampaón River, part of the Pánuco River system.

One of the characteristics that distinguishes Tamtoc is the remarkable feminine presence. To date, 90% of the burials discovered have been women. In addition, women are depicted in most of the clay and ceramic figurines found here and are thought to have held a high rank in the social divisions of the community.

The area has been known since the late 1800s to have pre-Columbian vestiges. It was explored in the late 1930s by Joaquína Trapaga Meade, and with greater intensity in the 1960s and was finally opened to the public on May 11, 2006 by the then-governor of San Luis Potosí, Marcelo de los Santos Fraga.

== Geography ==
The ancient city of Tamtoc settled on the Tamuín plain, in the meander of the Tampaón River. The geographical environment favored the production and collection of food that ensured the subsistence of numerous settlements settled around it. The Tampaón River, an important source of food, was the axis of merchandise exchange and social interaction with other regions.

The people of Tamtoc hunted and collected various products in the nearby mountain ranges. The Sierra de Tanchipa was also a sandstone quarry that served the artists as raw material to carve sculptures of rulers, priestesses and various public stelae that showed relevant events, memory of social and symbolic order. From the Cerro del Murcielago, green stone or tinguaíta was extracted that was transformed into corporal ornaments and utilitarian objects.

The plains and mountains that make up the landscape of Tamtoc were the scene of its historical evolution, guaranteed its economic sustenance and played a relevant role in the ritual and ideological aspect; Highlights in the topographic relief were indicators of astronomical phenomena and important references that influenced the design of the city itself.

== History ==
=== Local history ===
Tamtoc is considered the pre-Hispanic capital of the Huasteca for its regional, military and commercial importance. Until now, at least three periods of occupation have been identified: the oldest occurred around 600 BC, which corresponds to the time of the emergence of the city. The second occupation took place between 600 AD and 900 AD, it is distinguished by the arrival of a cultural trend without antecedents in the region that was in charge of redesigning the urban aspect of Tamtoc, strongly marking the regional leadership of the city. The last period happened between 900 and 1350 AD, it was characterized by an important population increase and an intense constructive activity that accounts for an increasingly powerful and complex society. At the end of this period, for reasons still unknown, the site lost regional hegemony and was abandoned.

=== Temporality ===
Tamtoc flourished in a very ancient time. While the Priestess was being carved, in Greece they were in the Peloponnese Wars, Rome did not exist, the Olmecs were at their peak, Egypt was in its late period, Babylon had already been abandoned and the Incas had not yet reached Peru.

== Archaeological Site ==
More than seventy structures have been discovered at the archaeological site, which have been recorded on drawings and maps. In the perimeter open to visitors there are thirty of them. There is a central square that probably functioned as a civic or administrative center, built in the last moments of the city. The main structures with:

East Structure or El Tizate, which has an altitude of 36 m.

East Structure or Paso Bayo, has an altitude of 21 m, and is considered a religious structure.

The Corcovado, a circular structure, considered a commercial and political point.

Monument 32, also known as The Priestess.

Monument 22, is also known as "El Robernante" "Cinco Caracol" or "Tomás", is a stone that represents the lower part of a naked man with a pierced penis and protected with an ixtle cover, that is to say, it is a allusion to the creation of the man of the Fifth Sun by Quetzalcóatl.2

The sculpture of the Scarred Woman or Venus of Tamtoc, is a fragmented female sculpture dating from 600 BC. C.

== Structures ==
=== East Structure ===
Also known as "Paso Bayo" or "Tamtoque" it has a height of 21 meters. Elevated structures, such as this one, commonly served as the basis for very important temples, from which various rituals related to the measurement of time and the movement of heavenly bodies were conducted. This structure is the second tallest on the site and marks the eastern limit of the monumental area.

=== Main Plaza ===
This group is made up of 23 architectural structures, of which 18 are around a plaza and five in the central part, all associated with administrative and religious activities.

The remaining structures have been identified as habitation bases belonging to the ruling elite, with the exception of structure AW3, which is identified as a small altar. Almost all the structures in this group have stairs that led to the upper part, where a temple or the housing complex was located.

Tamtoc Main Square in winter with Paso Bayo in the background

Structures AC1, AC2 and AW3 stand out because human burials were deposited inside them and in each of these two twin anthropomorphic stelae were found as offering.

The square has at least two construction periods, the first occurring between 600 and 900 AD. C. represented by circular structures most of these were covered by more recent structures. The buildings that can be seen today correspond to the last period between 900 and 1350 AD, when the city reached its peak.

=== Northeast Plaza ===
This group is made up of 10 mounds, nine of which surround a plaza and one is somewhat separated to the north. This set is associated with housing functions and the production of textiles.

=== North set ===
Canal del Manantial with Monument 32 (The Priestess) in the background and Structure 10 on the right

This area is made up of several structures and stands out for the discovery of different monuments such as the tombstone of the Flamingos, The Giant, the Castrillón Stela, La Venus de Tamtoc and the megalith of La Priestess (Monument 32). In this place there are springs that, through a system of old channels, distribute water to different parts of the sector, ending in the Laguna de los Patos.

Recent archaeological excavations carried out at the foot of structure C3, allowed to identify a place of production of beads for necklace and other ornaments.

=== Ferris Wheel ===
The area of La Noria is an important place in the city of Tamtoc, which has undergone constant changes due to the times that the city passed. Mainly the three main uses that it had over time can be differentiated, which were the following:

==== Fountain ====
Also known as Caja de Agua, it is part of the North Group sector and is where the ancient city of Tamtoc originated, because here the water is born and, due to its importance for life, it was considered a sacred place. The inhabitants of Tamtoc built a series of water distribution channels from the spring, from which a number of offerings have been recovered, including the monumental sculpture of The Priestess. These elements correspond to the first occupation, approximately in 600 a. C.

==== Work area ====
The Water Box was modified during the following period (600 and 900 AD), the space was desacralized and used in daily tasks represented by two ovens recovered in recent excavations, which could be used for food processing.

==== Cemetery ====
In the last period of occupation (between 900 and 1350 AD), new architectural buildings, temples, walkways and open spaces associated with religious ceremonies and sacred rituals were built in the same space as La Noria. A set of funerary tumults stands out from which around seventy human skeletons corresponding to individuals of different ages and sexes have been recovered.

The autopsies carried out on the skeletons have revealed that they suffered from severe infections, “In the bones of all individuals, noticeable deformations and traces of this type of pathology have been identified. So far, the population with these characteristics has only been located in this part of the site, "said Martínez Mora, who together with Guillermo Córdova Tello, coordinates the Archaeological Project of Origin and Development of the Urban Landscape of Tamtoc.

==== West Structure ====
It is one of the largest foundations on the site and has a front staircase. Formerly it was known as "El Tizate" because near this place, on the river bank, there is a deposit of crystallized carbonates or volcanic ash known locally as tizate, a material used in the production of ceramics. From its top, it is known that previously a temple was located, the entire environment of Tamtoc is dominated. This structure was the western marker that delimited the monumental area of the city. This basement is associated with activities related to astronomical observations for the cosmology that characterized the Huastec peoples.

==== Great Lagoon of the Ducks ====
The Great Lagoon of the Ducks, was thought at first to be a natural lagoon, but the hydrology and topography studies concluded that it was made by man. According to these investigations, it was prepared to avoid flooding by the Tampaón River.

During the recovery of the lagoon, various archaeological objects have been found that are part of offerings, which prevents working with heavy machinery to drain the lagoon, since it puts at risk the historical remains found there.

== Monuments ==
=== The priestess ===
Monument 32, better known as the Priestess, is a monumental lunar calendar, larger and older than the one known as Piedra del Sol or "Aztec Calendar". Its exact age is not yet established, but it is estimated that it was made between 1150 and 700 BC. apparently by the Olmecs, a culture that was not previously known had been established in this area at such an early time. The calendar is a monolith of polymineral sandstone, eight meters long and four meters high, with a thickness of 50 cm. and a weight greater than 30 tons. It is found in the North Set, more specifically in El Manantial de La Noria.

It was found accidentally in February 2005 while working on the restoration of the hydraulic channel that already during a time before the Spaniards led water from a spring to an artificial lagoon created within the city and it was until November 2006 when it was achieved.

Monument 32, The Ruler or Thomas

Because the weather and excess humidity caused by the rain and the stagnation of the spring water had started a process of degradation in the rock of the sculpture, for this reason the area of La Noria was subjected to intense conservation work; Currently, the work is focused on the recovery of a lagoon near the Spring, in order to integrate it into the public visit, since it is part of the natural environment where La Priestess was located.

=== The governor ===
Sculpture of the Scarred Woman as it is on display at the Tamtoc site museum, is over 2500 years old.

Monument 22, El Robernante or simply Tomás, is the lower part of a male human sculpture, this monument could represent an important character, perhaps a ruler of Tamtoc called Cinco Caracol since the position of his hand seems to be designed to carry a baton and the different inscriptions on the monument. Their nudity has been interpreted as an expression of the importance that fertility had among these peoples and the cult of the phallus.

=== The Scarred Woman ===
The sculpture of the Scarred Woman or the "Venus of Tamtoc" was found in 2005 during the rescue work of "Monument 32;" which was submerged in water for more than 2,500 years. This female sculpture of more than 2,500 years old in the La Noria area, in Tamtoc, is an unprecedented discovery, since there was no record of such a well-worked and detailed sculpture in Mesoamerica of that antiquity, as well as being from the female gender, which represents a rethinking of the role that women played in the social, political and religious life of pre-Hispanic cultures. The stone work of the sculpture rivals that of Ancient Greece, and has not been seen in any other sculpture in Mesoamerica.

The sculpture with feminine features and life-size, appears decapitated and is made of basalt stone, which does not exist in the region. This was fragmented for ritual purposes, instead of sacrificing an individual it was replaced by the object, in order to promote fertility, as it was placed in a water tank, archaeologists explain.

The Venus of Tamtoc has scarifications in the form of tattoos in high relief, which are observed on the shoulders, breasts and thighs of the sculpture, which refer to the 52 years of the Mesoamerican calendar, as well as the 104-year cycles of the lunar and solar cycle. It is presumed that the sculpture is not of a goddess, but of a priestess, which indicates the importance of women as a bearer of time through menstrual periods.

== Arts ==
=== Ceramics ===
The ceramic remains that have been found in Tamtoc speak of elaborate and decorated work. Common use vessels have been found in the houses that have been excavated, as well as offering ceramics in the Great Laguna de Los Patos, and also in funerary offerings.

The pieces found are in warehouses under the protection of the INAH, while resources are being sought for the Tamtoc Site Museum.

=== Sculpture ===
In Tamtoc, several sculpture workshops have been found in the La Noria area, among which a fragment of a stela of a zoomorphic character stands out, of which only the legs of a human being with the claws of a bird instead of feet can be seen. The sculptural fragment measures approximately one meter high by 1.5 wide and weighs 90 kilos.

The lapidary workshops add to the evidence that sculptures of the highest quality were made on the site by highly specialized artists.

=== Painting ===
Like all pre-Hispanic cities, the buildings of Tamtoc were also covered with illustrious and colorful murals and paintings. In the Northeast Plaza, remains of murals with red, orange, blue and green colors have been found in some structures.

== Culture ==
=== Procession of Spirits ===
For the Teenek community, the Tamtoque has a particular meaning because until the 1930s, the deceased were still buried in this place. Currently, various indigenous communities in the country, mainly Teeneks, meet in Tamtoc in November to hold the event known as the "Procession of Spirits." In this event, various dances take place for two days and each group places an offering at the foot of the Tamtoque in memory of their ancestors.

== Excavations ==
Tamtoc is still excavating and finding an endless number of artifacts that are taken to the INAH laboratories in Mexico City, its main promoter has been the Architect Guillermo Ahuja O., who made the work that grow since the beginning of the current century is done on site. The ruins of the city have been investigated, preserved and made available to the public thanks to the Trust for the Archaeological Rescue of Tamtoc, made up of the Fomento Cultural Banamex, AC, the Government of the State of San Luis Potosí and the National Institute of Anthropology and History.
