= Tamasopo =

Human settlement in Mexico

- Municipality
- Location in Mexico Tamasopo (Mexico)
- Country: Mexico
- State: San Luis Potosí
- Demonym: (in Spanish)
- Time zone: UTC−6 (CST)

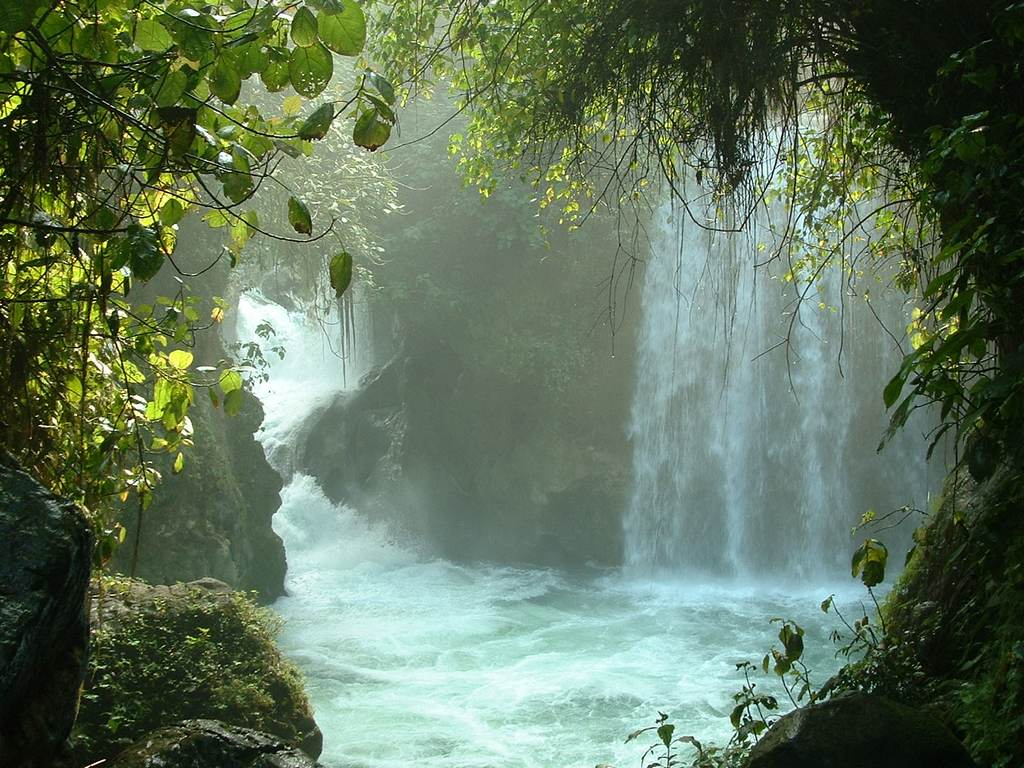
El Puente de Dios (The Bridge of God) in Tamasopo, SLP.

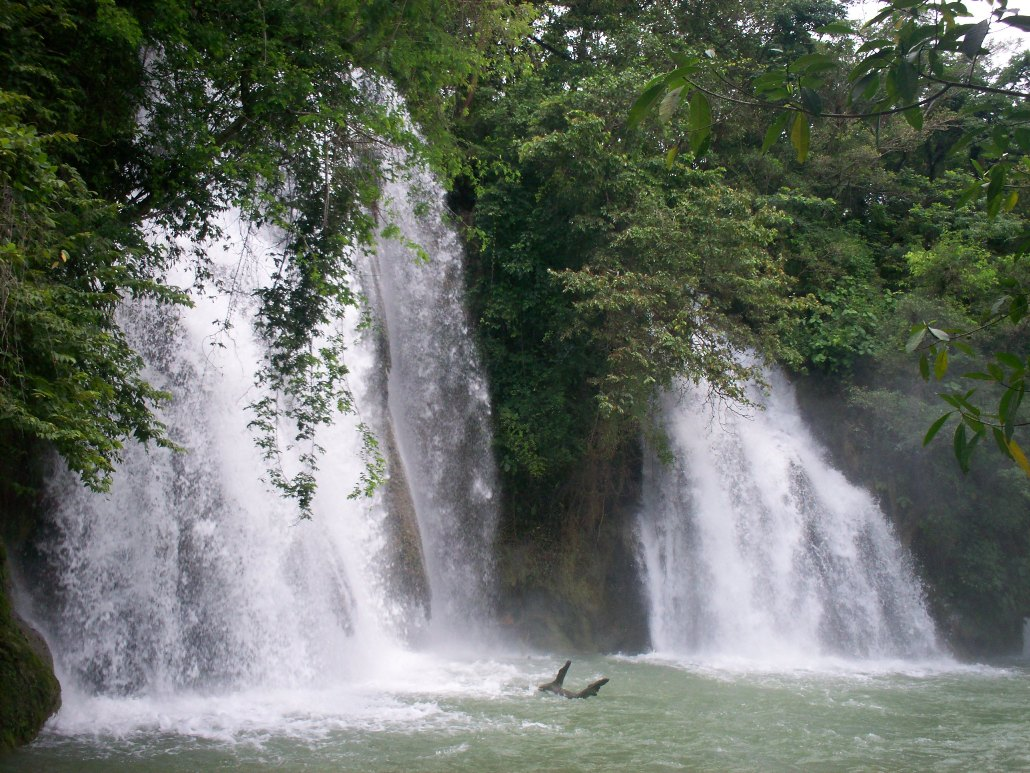
Two cascades in Tamasopo.

Tamasopo is a municipality and town in the Mexican state of San Luis Potosí. The town is located at 21°55′21″N 99°23′33″W. The municipality has an area of 1,329 square kilometres (513 sq mi) and a population of 28,848 in 2010, including the population of the town of Tamasopo with 4,326 people.

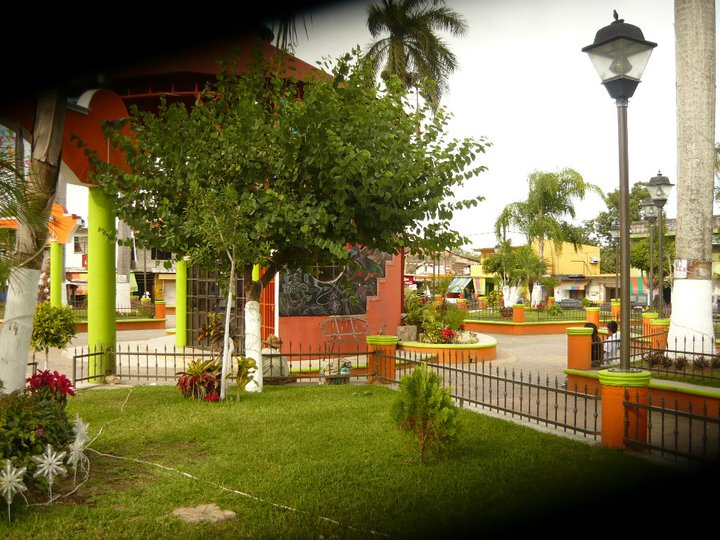
The main plaza in the town of Tamasopo.

== Geography ==
Tamasopo is located in the foothills of the Sierra Madre Oriental. The town has an elevation of 1,200 feet (370 m). The surrounding mountains rise to about 5,000 feet (1,500 m) above sea level. Tamasopo is famous for its waterfalls in a lush rain forest

El Puente de Dios is two miles (3 km) northwest of Tamasopo town. It consists of waterfalls into a narrow gorge and cavern beneath an arch through which the Gallinas river runs rapidly. Blue and clear water pools for swimming are at the top and bottom of the cavern. The Cascada de Tamasopo is two miles (3 km) north of the town. It features three cascades tumbling about 20 metres (66 ft) into pools divided by travertine ledges and shelves. The character of the waterfalls reminds some travelers of Havasu Falls in the Grand Canyon. Nearby is El Trampolin which consists of small waterfalls falling into clear, deep pools in the midst of a tropical forest.

=== Climate ===
Climate data for Tamasopo
Month	Jan	Feb	Mar	Apr	May	Jun	Jul	Aug	Sep	Oct	Nov	Dec	Year
Mean daily maximum °C (°F)	24.2 (75.6)	27.0 (80.6)	30.5 (86.9)	33.1 (91.6)	34.2 (93.6)	33.0 (91.4)	30.9 (87.6)	31.3 (88.3)	29.1 (84.4)	27.6 (81.7)	26.2 (79.2)	24.0 (75.2)	29.3 (84.7)
Daily mean °C (°F)	17.0 (62.6)	19.0 (66.2)	22.0 (71.6)	25.0 (77.0)	27.0 (80.6)	27.0 (80.6)	26.0 (78.8)	27.0 (80.6)	26.0 (78.8)	23.0 (73.4)	20.0 (68.0)	18.0 (64.4)	23.0 (73.4)
Mean daily minimum °C (°F)	9.2 (48.6)	10.5 (50.9)	13.4 (56.1)	16.1 (61.0)	19.2 (66.6)	20.2 (68.4)	19.5 (67.1)	19.4 (66.9)	18.6 (65.5)	16.0 (60.8)	13.3 (55.9)	9.9 (49.8)	15.4 (59.7)
Average precipitation mm (inches)	37 (1.5)	31 (1.2)	28 (1.1)	54 (2.1)	102 (4.0)	311 (12.2)	324 (12.8)	279 (11.0)	380 (15.0)	168 (6.6)	64 (2.5)	42 (1.7)	1,818 (71.6)
Source: Weatherbase

The climate of Tamasopo is classified as sub-tropical Cwa (Koppen) or Cwal (Trewartha).

== History ==
Tamasopo is located in the Huasteca region, named after the indigenous people of the area. Indigenous people number 4,461 people in the municipality of whom 2,950 speak an indigenous language. The indigenous population belongs mostly to two groups: the Huastecas who traditionally lived in the southern portion of the municipality and the Pame who lived in the northern part of the municipality.

== See also ==
- Agua Puerca
