= Alaquines =

Coordinates: 22°08′N 99°36′W

Alaquines, San Luis Potosi
- Municipality and town
- Interactive map of Alaquines, San Luis Potosi
- Country: Mexico
- State: San Luis Potosí
- Time zone: UTC-6 (Zona Centro)

Alaquines is a municipality and town in the Mexican state of San Luis Potosí. It is 19 km away from Cárdenas.

Alaquines has a population of approximately 1,149.

== Geography ==
=== Climate ===
Climate data for Alaquines
Month	Jan	Feb	Mar	Apr	May	Jun	Jul	Aug	Sep	Oct	Nov	Dec	Year
Mean daily maximum °C (°F)	19.9 (67.8)	21.6 (70.9)	24.2 (75.6)	26.4 (79.5)	27.0 (80.6)	25.8 (78.4)	24.4 (75.9)	24.5 (76.1)	24 (75)	23.3 (73.9)	21.8 (71.2)	20.6 (69.1)	23.6 (74.5)
Mean daily minimum °C (°F)	5.1 (41.2)	5.7 (42.3)	7.6 (45.7)	9.3 (48.7)	10.6 (51.1)	11.4 (52.5)	11.4 (52.5)	11.0 (51.8)	11.0 (51.8)	9.4 (48.9)	7.5 (45.5)	6.0 (42.8)	8.8 (47.8)
Average precipitation mm (inches)	23 (0.9)	18 (0.7)	23 (0.9)	25 (1)	46 (1.8)	200 (7.9)	230 (8.9)	210 (8.4)	220 (8.8)	81 (3.2)	28 (1.1)	15 (0.6)	1,120 (44.2)
Source: Weatherbase

== History ==
Founded in 1616 with the old name of San José de los Montes Alaquines.

== Recently ==
The City of Alaquines agreed to fix the road from Alaquines to San Jose del Corito that will be completed in 2009.

== Communities ==
The town's population is divided into 10 communities, which are listed as follows:

1. Colonia Indigena
2. Las Tuzas
3. Rancho de Pro
4. Los Morales
5. La Cañada
6. Martínez
7. Rancho Nuevo
8. Maldonado
9. Las Huertas
10. El Pasito de San Francisco
11. El Sabino
12. San José del Corito
13. San José de Palmas

== Mayors of Alaquines ==
- Ignacio Federico Infante Martínez (1971–1973)
- Pedro Rodarte Rodríguez (1974–1976)
- Delfino Aguilar Reynaga (1977–1979)
- Abdenago Chávez Mendiola (1980–1982)
- Carlos Saldierna Vázquez (1983–1985)
- Salomón Montalbán U. (1986–1988)
- Tomás Aguilar I. (1992–1994)
- Alberto Castillo P. (1995–1997)
- Abdenango Chávez Mendiola (1997–2000)
- Bonifacio Carreón Moctezuma (2000–2003)
- J. Isabel Ruíz Cedillo (2004–2006)
- María Leonides Secaida López (2006–2009)
- Manuel Lara Barcenas (2009-2012)
- Ciriaco Carreon Rucoba (2013-2016)
