= Ciudad Fernández =

Coordinates: 21°57′N 100°00′W

- Municipality and town
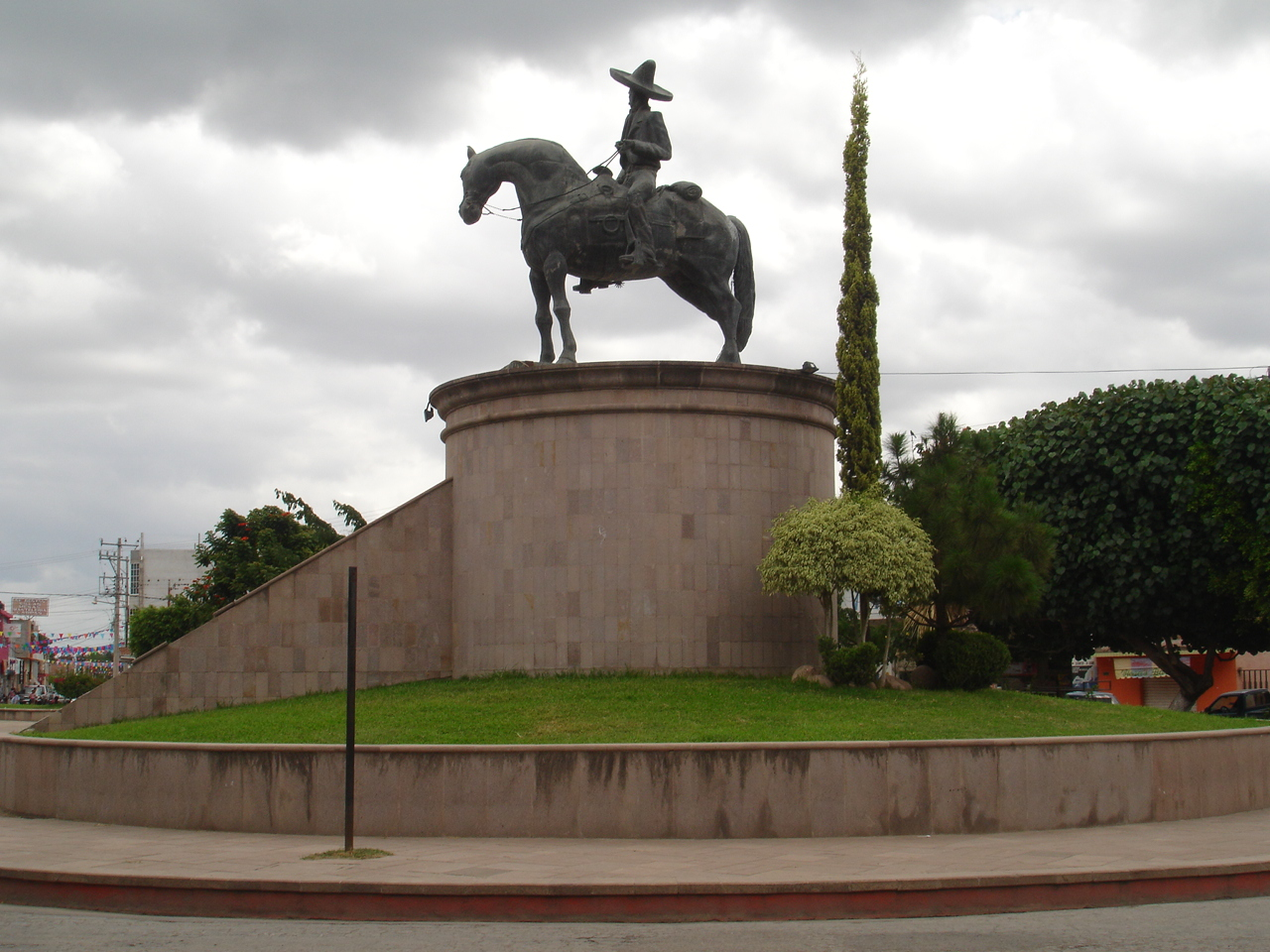

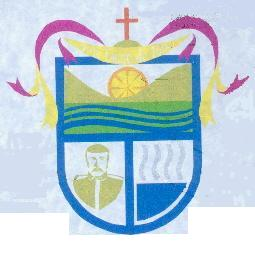
- Coat of arms
- Interactive map of Ciudad Fernández
- Country: Mexico
- State: San Luis Potosí

Population (2020)
  - Total: 48,106
- Time zone: UTC-6 (Zona Centro)

Ciudad Fernández is a town and municipality in the central Mexican state of San Luis Potosí.
