= Ciudad del Maíz =

- Municipality and town
- Location in Mexico Ciudad del Maíz (Mexico)
- Coordinates: 22°24′N 99°36′W
- Country: Mexico
- State: San Luis Potosí
- Time zone: UTC-6 (Central)

Ciudad del Maíz is a town and municipality in the Mexican state of San Luis Potosí.

In 2023, Zaragoza was designated a Pueblo Mágico by the Mexican government, recognizing its cultural and historical importance.

Ciudad del Maíz dates back to the prehistoric era with nomadic groups. Obsidian objects have been discovered here, such as blades, scrapers and arrowheads, as well as cave paintings that are not Huastecan. As time went by, the native settlers of Pame origin were the ones who gave the name M'Pu 'N'Tjua, which means Valley of Corn.

Ciudad del Maíz is located in the northwest of the state and approximately 145 kilometers from the city of San Luis Potosí. In addition, the municipality borders Tamaulipas to the north; to the east by El Naranjo; to the south by the municipality of Alaquines; and to the west by the municipalities of Rioverde, Villa Juárez, Cerritos and Guadalcázar.

Among its attractions, the Temple of the Immaculate Conception stands out. A jewel of colonial architecture over 300 years old, its dome is the work of the late Baroque style and an emblem of the city. The temple contains several relics in the image of the Immaculate Conception.

The Plaza de Armas, whose kiosk is one of the first to be imported from Europe to Mexico, is a French-style iron structure. It contains a bust that belongs to the Generalissimo of the Americas, the priest Miguel Hidalgo y Costilla.

The Town Hall building is the work of local architecture, the former house of the Barragán. The arches were added in the early twentieth century.

The main dish is the "drunken stew," made from pulque, various types of meat, vegetables, cooked all this in pulque. Gorditas, which is a medium corn tortilla stuffed with different stews. As well as nopales, pumpkins, chochas, tunitas and cottage cheese.

The enchiladas potosinas are different because they are prepared in extended tortillas scrambled with red chiles, stuffed with potatoes with carrots and chorizo, tomato, onion, lettuce, cheese and salsa. Corn husk tamales, stuffed with pork carnitas, chicken, beans, and goat cheese.
