= Ciudad Valles =

- City and municipality
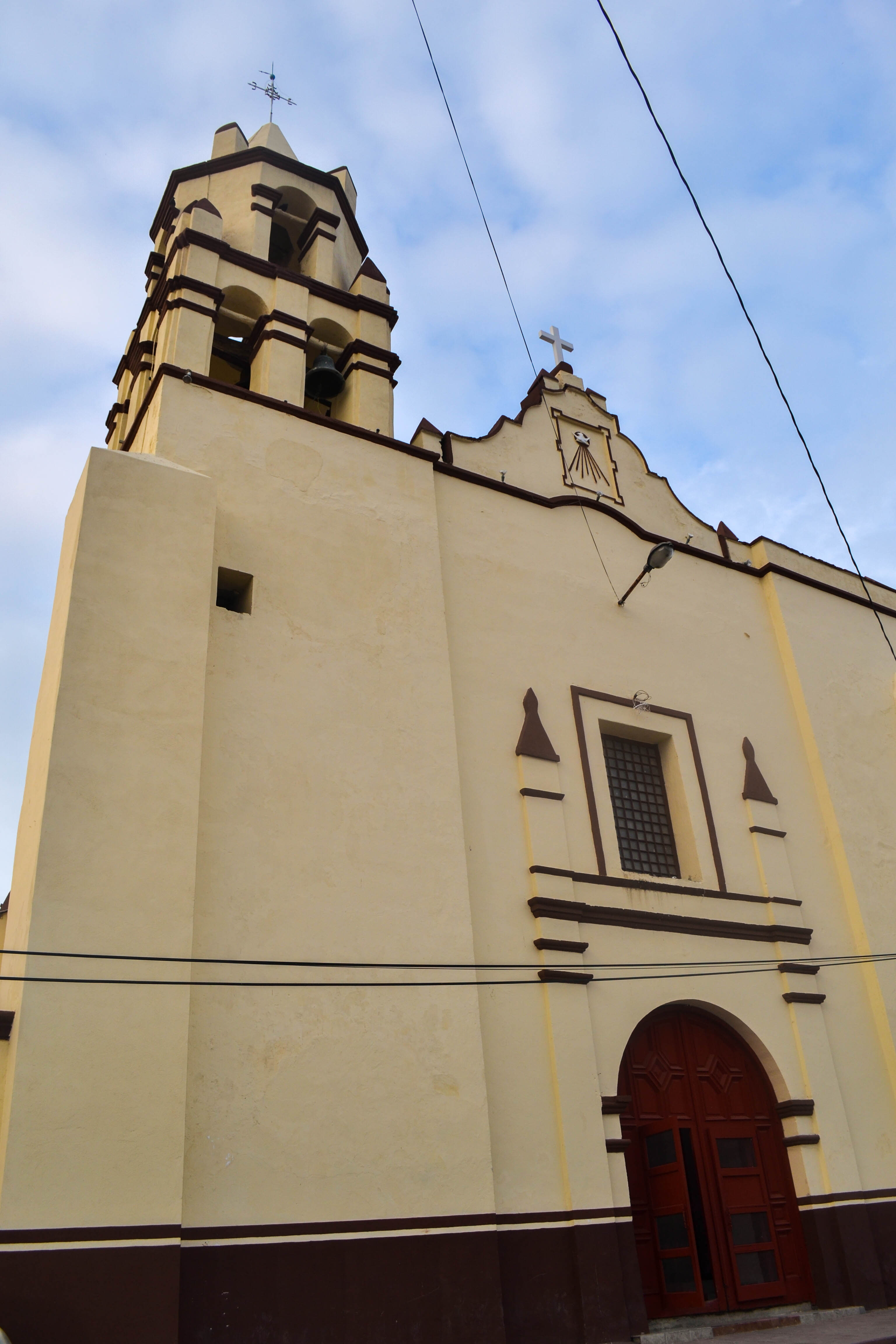
- Parroquia Santiago Apóstol
- Interactive map of Ciudad Valles
- Coordinates: 21°59′0″N 99°1′0″W
- Country: Mexico
- State: San Luis Potosí

Area
  - Municipality: 2,424 km^{2} (936 sq mi)
  - City: 36.15 km^{2} (13.96 sq mi)

Population (2020 census)
  - Municipality: 179,371
  - Density: 74.00/km^{2} (191.7/sq mi)
  - City: 136,351
  - City density: 3,772/km^{2} (9,769/sq mi)
- Time zone: UTC-6 (Zona Centro)

Ciudad Valles is the third-largest city in the Mexican state of San Luis Potosí. It is located in the eastern part of the state (21°59′00″N 99°1′0″W), in the cultural region of Huasteca. The city is also the municipal seat of the surrounding municipality of the same name. It had a 2020 census population of 136,351.

== Government ==
Ciudad Valles is a municipality governed by a democratically elected Presidente Municipal (Municipal President) or Mayor for a period of three years.

== Geography ==
=== Climate ===
Ciudad Valles has a humid tropical climate. During the summer from April to October, Ciudad Valles experiences high temperatures. The all-time high temperature is 53 °C (127 °F) along with a consistent humidity. In the winter Ciudad Valles has mild temperatures; a few times a year the thermometer registers less than 10 °C (50 °F) The all-time low is 0 °C (32 °F).

== Transportation ==
The Pan-American Highway or Interamerican Highway built in the 1930s represents Ciudad Valles' most vital corridor. The Highway leads north to Nuevo Laredo via Monterrey, and to the south to Mexico City.

Ciudad Valles connects San Luis Potosí with Tampico. Both cities are politically and economically interrelated with Ciudad Valles.

== Tourism ==
Ciudad Valles is one of Mexico's most popular destinations for tourists.

=== Micos waterfall ===
These waterfalls are known for their steep falls in the middle of hills surrounded by vegetation.

These waterfalls are located 18 kilometers (11 mi) from Ciudad Valles and are part of Tampaon river, best known as the Micos River. This name was given due to the abundance of spider monkeys that inhabited this area. This river goes down through a large series of falls with a vertiginous acceleration. Rafting through the rapids of this river is a common activity. At the top of the waterfall there is a scenic viewpoint.

=== Tamasopo ===
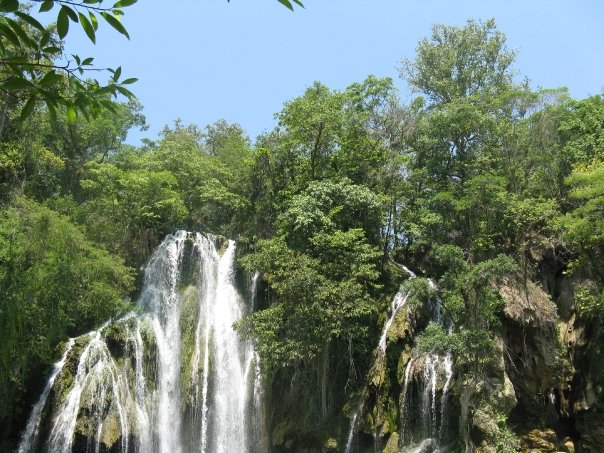
View of the Tamasopo Falls in San Luis Potosí

Another destination for adventure tourism for the Verastegui Sierra, where the spectacle of the Espinazo del Diablo (Backbone of the Devil) and its ravines which are up to 300 meters (980 feet) deep can be seen. In this place, access is difficult due to the rough terrain.

Tamasopo waterfalls are nearby, a group of three waterfalls that form a 20-meter (66-foot) waterfall that falls violently into a 5 meter deep well, in whose banks there are beaches.

=== Tamul waterfall ===
From the town of Tanchachín, the Tamul waterfall is about two hours by boat. With a 105-meter (344-foot) drop, it is the highest waterfall in the state of San Luis Potosí. It is known its height and its crystalline turquoise water. Formed by the waters of the Gallinas River at its confluence with the Tampaon, Tamul Falls cascade into the Tampaon River. Twenty five miles downstream from the falls, the Tampaon meanders past the ancient pyramid site of Tamtoc. Archaeologists believe that Tamtoc is the northernmost pre-Columbian city with pyramids in Mexico, and some speculate that it could be the place of origin of the Aztecs from which they launched their migration to the Valley of Mexico. The best time to visit the waterfall is during the low water season from July to October, when it is easily accessible.

=== Tancanhuitz de Santos ===
This town is located 65 kilometers (40 mi) from Ciudad Valles. The Huehuetlan Sierra creek is located here, which is a natural frontier that divides the huastecas to the south and the nahuatlacos native groups.

These two indigenous groups nowadays still preserve their languages, dress and customs from their ancestors. When going down from their communities towards the "tianguis" (street market) every Sunday, women wear their quetzquemaletls (v.-shaped ponchos) that they knit and embroider. The languages spoken here mix Nahuatl, Huasteco and Spanish.
