= List of mayors and presidents of San Luis Potosí municipality =

The following is a list of municipal presidents of the municipality of San Luis Potosí in the Mexican state of the same name.

Term	Officer	Office	Notes
1592	Miguel Caldera	Senior judge	
1592	Juan de Oñate	Mayor	
1593	Juan de Oñate	Mayor	Until 25 October
1593	Juan López del Riego	Mayor	Appointed 13 October
1594	Juan López del Riego	Mayor	
1595	Juan López del Riego	Mayor	
1596	Juan López del Riego	Mayor	Ceased at the beginning of the year
1596	Luis de Valderrama Saavedra	Mayor	
1597	Luis de Valderrama Saavedra	Mayor	
1598	Luis de Valderrama Saavedra	Mayor	
1599	Luis de Valderrama Saavedra	Mayor	
1599	Leonel de Cervantes	Mayor	At the end of the year
1600	Leonel Cervantes	Mayor	
1601	Leonel Cervantes	Mayor	
1602	Leonel Cervantes	Mayor	
1603	Joan de Frías Salazar	Mayor	
1604	Joan de Frías Salazar	Mayor	
1605	Joan de Frías Salazar	Mayor	Ceased in June
1606	Juan de Marmolejo	Mayor	
1607	Juan de Marmolejo	Mayor	Ceased in April
1607	Alonso de Oñate	Mayor	
1608	Alonso de Oñate	Mayor	
1609	Alonso de Oñate	Mayor	
1609	Francisco Mejía de Carvajal	Mayor	In November
1610	Francisco Mejía de Carvajal	Mayor	
1611	Francisco Mejía de Carvajal	Mayor	He ceased in November, and died
1612	Juan Zaldívar Mendoza	Mayor	
1613	Juan Zaldívar Mendoza	Mayor	Ceased
1613	Pedro Salazar	Mayor	He was already in office in August
1614	Pedro de Salazar	Mayor	
1615	Pedro Salazar	Mayor	
1616	Pedro Salazar	Mayor	
1617	Pedro Salazar	Mayor	
1618	Pedro Salazar	Mayor	
1619	Alonso Guajardo Mejía	Mayor	
1620	Alonso Guajardo Mejía	Mayor	
1621	Alonso Guajardo Mejía	Mayor	Ceased in the middle of the year
1621	Alonso Tello Guzmán	Mayor	
1622	Alonso Tello Guzmán	Mayor	
1623	Alonso Tello Guzmán	Mayor	He died on 27 January
1623	Juan Cerezo de Salamanca	Mayor	Since March
1624	Juan de Cerezo de Salamanca	Mayor	
1625	Juan de Cerezo de Salamanca	Mayor	
1626	Juan de Cerezo de Salamanca	Mayor	Ceased in July
1626	Diego de Astudillo Carrillo	Mayor	At the end of the year; days later he left office
1627	Martín del Pozo y Aguilar	Mayor	
1628	Martín del Pozo y Aguilar	Mayor	
1629	Martín del Pozo y Aguilar	Mayor	
1630	Martín del Pozo y Aguilar	Mayor	
1631	Martín del Pozo y Aguilar	Mayor	Ceased in June
1631	Pedro de Vértiz	Mayor	
1632	Pedro de Vértiz	Mayor	
1633	Pedro de Vértiz	Mayor	
1634	Pedro de Vértiz	Mayor	
1635	Pedro de Vértiz	Mayor	
1636	Pedro de Vértiz	Mayor	
1637	Lope de Mozalve y Almendáriz	Mayor	
1638	Lope de Mozalve y Almendáriz	Mayor	
1639	Lope de Mozalve y Almendáriz	Mayor	
1640	Lope de Mozalve y Almendáriz	Mayor	
1640	Álvaro Ramírez de Arellano	Mayor	February
1641	Lope de Mozalve y Almendáriz	Mayor	
1641	León de Alza	Mayor	Appointed 20 September 1640
1642	León de Alza	Mayor	
1643	León de Alza	Mayor	
1644	León de Alza	Mayor	
1645	León de Alza	Mayor	
1646	León de Alza	Mayor	
1647	León de Alza	Mayor	Ceased by the end of the year
1647	Nicolás de Bonilla y Bastida	Mayor	At the end of the year
1648	Nicolás de Bonilla y Bastida	Mayor	
1649	Nicolás de Bonilla y Bastida	Mayor	
1650	Nicolás de Bonilla y Bastida	Mayor	Ceased in March
1650	Alonso de Guzmán	Mayor	
1651	Alonso de Guzmán	Mayor	
1652	Alonso de Guzmán	Mayor	Ceased
1652	Diego de Ulloa Pereira	Mayor	Since March
1653	Diego de Ulloa Pereira	Mayor	Ceased in November
1653	Juan Antonio de Irurzun	Mayor	
1654	Juan Antonio de Irurzun	Mayor	Took office in July
1655	Juan Antonio de Irurzun	Mayor	
1656	Juan Antonio de Irurzun	Mayor	September
1657	Juan Antonio de Irurzun	Mayor	
1658	Bernardo Pérez de Azpilicueta	Mayor	
1659	Bernardo Pérez de Azpilicueta	Mayor	He ceased on 21 April, but continued until January 1660
(1659)	Tristán Luna y Arellano	Mayor	Appointed by real provision on 9 May
1660	Bernardo Pérez de Azpilicueta	Mayor	
1660	Tristán Luna y Arellano	Mayor	
1661	Tristán Luna y Arellano	Mayor	Ceased
1661	Juan Ruiz de Zavala y Lois	Mayor	March
1661	Fernando de Torres y Ávila	Mayor	June
1662	Fernando de Torres y Ávila	Mayor	
1663	Fernando de Torres y Ávila	Mayor	
1664	Fernando de Torres y Ávila	Mayor	
1664	Pedro Sáenz Izquierdo	Mayor	Appointed on 11 November
1665	Pedro Sáenz Izquierdo	Mayor	
1666	Pedro Sáenz Izquierdo	Mayor	
1666	Bartolomé de Estrada y Valdés	Mayor	Appointed on 17 December
1666	Diego de Valdés	Mayor	Appointed on 20 December
1667	Bartolomé de Estrada y Valdés	Mayor	
1668	Bartolomé de Estrada y Valdés	Mayor	Ceased in December
1668	Alfonso Flores y Valdés	Mayor	Appointed on 14 October
1669	Alfonso Flores y Valdés	Mayor	
1670	Alfonso Flores y Valdés	Mayor	Ceased
1670	Juan Ruiz de Zavala y Lois	Mayor	Appointed on 16 November
1671	Juan Ruiz de Zavala y Lois	Mayor	
1672	Juan Ruiz de Zavala y Lois	Mayor	
1673	Juan Ruiz de Zavala y Lois	Mayor	
1674	Feliciano Hurtado de Amézaga Salazar	Mayor	January to June
1674	Martín de Mendalde	Mayor	Appointed on 8 February; arrived in July
1675	Martín de Mendalde	Mayor	
1676	Martín de Mendalde	Mayor	
1677	Martín de Mendalde	Mayor	
1677	Francisco de Gatica	Mayor	
1677	Pedro de Ullate Ordóñez	Mayor	December
1678	Pedro de Ullate Ordóñez	Mayor	
1679	Pedro de Ullate Ordóñez	Mayor	
1680	Pedro de Ullate Ordóñez	Mayor	
1680	Luis Francisco de Ullate y Escobedo	Mayor	June to December
1680	Juan de Camacho Xayna	Mayor	1 December
1681	Juan de Camacho Xayna	Mayor	
1682	Juan de Camacho Xayna	Mayor	
1683	Juan de Camacho Xayna	Mayor	
1684	Juan de Camacho Xayna	Mayor	
1685	Juan de Camacho Xayna	Mayor	Until mid June
1685	Juan Bautista Ansaldo de Peralta	Mayor	
1686	Juan Bautista Ansaldo de Peralta	Mayor	
1687	Juan Bautista Ansaldo de Peralta	Mayor	
1687	Bernardo de Iñiguez de Vayo	Mayor	Late July
1688	Bernardo de Iñiguez de Vayo	Mayor	
1689	Bernardo de Iñiguez de Vayo	Mayor	
1690	Bernardo de Iñiguez de Vayo	Mayor	
1690	Alonso Muñoz de Castiblanque	Mayor	In June
1691	Alonso Muñoz de Castiblanque	Mayor	
1692	Alonso Muñoz de Castiblanque	Mayor	Ceased
1692	Domingo Terán de los Ríos	Mayor	25 August
1693	Domingo Terán de los Ríos	Mayor	
1693	Pascual Álvarez Serrano	Mayor	February
1694	Domingo Terán de los Ríos	Mayor	Ceased
1694	Francisco Eusebio del Castillo y Saavedra	Mayor	Entered around the month of March
1695	Francisco Eusebio del Castillo y Saavedra	Mayor	
1696	Francisco Eusebio del Castillo y Saavedra	Mayor	
1697	Francisco Eusebio del Castillo y Saavedra	Mayor	
1698	Francisco Eusebio del Castillo y Saavedra	Mayor	
1698	Antonio Fernández del Rivero	Mayor	
1699	Antonio Fernández del Rivero	Mayor	
1700	Antonio Fernández del Rivero	Mayor	
1701	Antonio Fernández del Rivero	Mayor	
1701	Juan Orejón de la Lama y Medrano	Mayor	
1702	Juan Orejón de la Lama y Medrano	Mayor	
1703	Juan Orejón de la Lama y Medrano	Mayor	
1704	Juan Orejón de la Lama y Medrano	Mayor	
1705	Juan Orejón de la Lama y Medrano	Mayor	
1706	Manuel Diez Llanos	Mayor	
1706	Andrés Álvarez Maldonado	Mayor	
1707	Andrés Álvarez Maldonado	Mayor	
1708	Andrés Álvarez Maldonado	Mayor	
1709	Andrés Álvarez Maldonado	Mayor	Ceased on 23 February
1709	Coronel Sebastián de Oloris	Mayor	
1710	Coronel Sebastián de Oloris	Mayor	
1711	Coronel Sebastián de Oloris	Mayor	
1712	Coronel Sebastián de Oloris	Mayor	
1713	Coronel Sebastián de Oloris	Mayor	
1714	Francisco José Vélez Escalante	Mayor	
1715	Francisco José Vélez Escalante	Mayor	
1716	Francisco José Vélez Escalante	Mayor	
1716	Ventura de Zavala y Balanza	Mayor	
1717	Ventura de Zavala y Balanza	Mayor	
1718	Leonardo de la Mora y Torres	Mayor	
1719	Leonardo de la Mora y Torres	Mayor	
1719	Juan Ángel Roldán	Mayor	
1720	Leonardo de la Mora y Torres	Mayor	
1721	Leonardo de la Mora y Torres	Mayor	
1719	Juan Leandro Pérez Serrano	Mayor	30 May
1722	Juan Leandro Pérez Serrano	Mayor	
1723	Juan Leandro Pérez Serrano	Mayor	
1723	Antonio Ruiz de Huidobro y Sarabia	Mayor	13 October 1722
1724	Antonio Ruiz de Huidobro y Sarabia	Mayor	
1725	Antonio Ruiz de Huidobro y Sarabia	Mayor	
1726	Antonio Ruiz de Huidobro y Sarabia	Mayor	
1727	Antonio Ruiz de Huidobro y Sarabia	Mayor	
1728	Antonio Ruiz de Huidobro y Sarabia	Mayor	
1729	Antonio Ruiz de Huidobro y Sarabia	Mayor	Passed away
1729	Fernando Manuel Monroy y Carrillo	Mayor	17 March
1730	Fernando Manuel Monroy y Carrillo	Mayor	
1731	Fernando Manuel Monroy y Carrillo	Mayor	Ceased in June
1731	Victoriano de Oliván	Mayor	
1732	Victoriano de Oliván	Mayor	
1733	Victoriano de Oliván	Mayor	
1734	Victoriano de Oliván	Mayor	
1734	Antonio Francisco de Medina y Calderón	Mayor	September
1735	Antonio Francisco de Medina y Calderón	Mayor	
1736	Victoriano de Oliván	Mayor	
1737	Victoriano de Oliván	Mayor	
1738	Victoriano de Oliván	Mayor	
1739	Victoriano de Oliván	Mayor	
1740	Victoriano de Oliván	Mayor	
1740	Luis Vélez de las Cuevas Cabeza de Vaca	Mayor	December
1741	Luis Vélez de las Cuevas Cabeza de Vaca	Mayor	
1742	Miguel Yánez	Mayor	26 January
1743	Miguel Yánez	Mayor	
1744	Miguel Yánez	Mayor	
1745	Miguel Yánez	Mayor	
1745	Julián de Corzánigo	Mayor	April
1746	Julián de Corzánigo	Mayor	
1747	Julián de Corzánigo	Mayor	
1748	Juan Coutiño de los Ríos	Mayor	August
1749	Juan Coutiño de los Ríos	Mayor	
1749	Luis Lasso de la Vega y Ponce de León	Mayor	
1750	Luis Lasso de la Vega y Ponce de León	Mayor	
1751	Luis Lasso de la Vega y Ponce de León	Mayor	
1752	Luis Lasso de la Vega y Ponce de León	Mayor	
1753	Luis Lasso de la Vega y Ponce de León	Mayor	
1753	Joseph Xavier Gatuno y Lemos	Mayor	
1754	Joseph Xavier Gatuno y Lemos	Mayor	
1755	Joseph Xavier Gatuno y Lemos	Mayor	
1756	Joseph Xavier Gatuno y Lemos	Mayor	
1757	Joseph Xavier Gatuno y Lemos	Mayor	
1758	Joseph Xavier Gatuno y Lemos	Mayor	
1759	Joseph Xavier Gatuno y Lemos	Mayor	
1759	Tomás de Costa y Uribe	Mayor	
1760	Tomás de Costa y Uribe	Mayor	
1761	Tomás de Costa y Uribe	Mayor	
1762	Tomás de Costa y Uribe	Mayor	
1763	Tomás de Costa y Uribe	Mayor	
1764	Tomás de Costa y Uribe	Mayor	
1765	Tomás de Costa y Uribe	Mayor	Ceased on 27 January
1765	Andrés de Urbina Gaviria y Eguíluz	Mayor	
1766	Andrés de Urbina Gaviria y Eguíluz	Mayor	
1767	Andrés de Urbina Gaviria y Eguíluz	Mayor	
1768	Andrés de Urbina Gaviria y Eguíluz	Mayor	
1769	Andrés de Urbina Gaviria y Eguíluz	Mayor	
1770	Andrés de Urbina Gaviria y Eguíluz	Mayor	Ceased on 2 September
1771	Fernando Rubín de Celis Pariente y Noriega	Mayor	
1772	Fernando Rubín de Celis Pariente y Noriega	Mayor	
1773	Fernando Rubín de Celis Pariente y Noriega	Mayor	
1774	Antonio Joaquín de Llano y Villaurrutia	Mayor	
1775	Antonio Joaquín de Llano y Villaurrutia	Mayor	
1776	Antonio Joaquín de Llano y Villaurrutia	Mayor	Ceased in July
1776	Jacinto Pérez de arroyo	Mayor	
1777	Jacinto Pérez de arroyo	Mayor	
1778	Jacinto Pérez de arroyo	Mayor	
1779	Jacinto Pérez de arroyo	Mayor	Died on 29 December
1779	Manuel Días Fernández	Mayor	29 December
1780	Manuel Días Fernández	Mayor	
1781	Manuel Días Fernández	Mayor	
1782	Manuel Días Fernández	Mayor	Ceased in March
1782	Juan Antonio Flores	Mayor	
1782	Joseph de Castillo y Loaeza	Mayor	
1783	Joseph de Castillo y Loaeza	Mayor	
1784	Joseph de Castillo y Loaeza	Mayor	
1785	Joseph de Castillo y Loaeza	Mayor	
1786	Joseph de Castillo y Loaeza	Mayor	
1787	Joseph de Castillo y Loaeza	Mayor	Ceased
1787	Bruno Díaz de Salcedo	Intendant	25 October
1788	Bruno Díaz de Salcedo	Intendant	
1789	Bruno Díaz de Salcedo	Intendant	
1790	Bruno Díaz de Salcedo	Intendant	
1791	Bruno Díaz de Salcedo	Intendant	
1792	Bruno Díaz de Salcedo	Intendant	
1793	Bruno Díaz de Salcedo	Intendant	
1794	Bruno Díaz de Salcedo	Intendant	
1795	Bruno Díaz de Salcedo	Intendant	
1796	Bruno Díaz de Salcedo	Intendant	
1797	Bruno Díaz de Salcedo	Intendant	
1798	Bruno Díaz de Salcedo	Intendant	
1799	Bruno Díaz de Salcedo	Intendant	Died on 2 November
1799	Vicente Bernabéu	Acting intendant	
1800	Vicente Bernabéu	Acting intendant	
1800	Cristóbal de Corbalán	Acting intendant	
1801	Cristóbal de Corbalán	Acting intendant	
1801	Onésimo Antonio Durán	Intendant	
1802	Onésimo Antonio Durán	Intendant	
1803	Onésimo Antonio Durán	Intendant	Ceased on 22 November
1803	Manuel Ampudia	Intendant	
1804	Manuel Ampudia	Intendant	Left on 30 November
1805	Joseph Ignacio Vélez	Acting intendant	Ceased in February
1805	Joseph Manuel Ruiz de Aguirre	Acting intendant	
1806	Joseph Manuel Ruiz de Aguirre	Acting intendant	
1807	Joseph Manuel Ruiz de Aguirre	Acting intendant	
1808	Joseph Manuel Ruiz de Aguirre	Acting intendant	
1809	Joseph Manuel Ruiz de Aguirre	Acting intendant	
1810	Joseph Manuel Ruiz de Aguirre	Acting intendant	
1810	Manuel Jacinto de Acevedo	Intendant	
1811	Manuel Jacinto de Acevedo	Intendant	
1812	Manuel Jacinto de Acevedo	Intendant	
1813	Manuel Jacinto de Acevedo	Intendant and corregidor	
1813	Manuel Jacinto de Acevedo	Intendant and political chief	4 July
1814	Manuel Jacinto de Acevedo	Intendant	
1815	Manuel Jacinto de Acevedo	Intendant	
1816	Manuel Jacinto de Acevedo	Intendant	
1817	Manuel Jacinto de Acevedo	Intendant	
1818	Manuel Jacinto de Acevedo	Intendant	
1819	Manuel Jacinto de Acevedo	Intendant	
1820	Manuel Jacinto de Acevedo	Intendant	
1821	Manuel Jacinto de Acevedo	Intendant and political chief	
1821	Manuel Jacinto de Acevedo	Intendant and chief of the Army	
1822	Manuel Jacinto de Acevedo	Intendant	He retired on 20 March
1823	José Ildefonso Díaz de León	Political chief	
1824	José Ildefonso Díaz de León	Acting governor	
1825	Pantaleón de Ipiña	Mayor	
1826	Eulogio Esnaurrízar	Mayor	
1827	Ignacio de Aztegui	Prefect	
1828	Ignacio de Aztegui	Prefect	
1829	Ignacio de Aztegui	Prefect	Resigned
1829	José Gregorio Sousa	Prefect	Since 1 February
1830	Jesús Valdés	Prefect	Ceased
1830	Manuel Othón	Prefect	
1830	Teniente Coronel Manuel Sánchez	Prefect	21 July
1831	Andrés de la Gándara	Mayor	
1832	Andrés de la Gándara	Mayor	
1833	José Vicente Liñán	Prefect	
1834	Pedro Hernández	Prefect	
1835	Andrés de la Gándara	Prefect	
1836	Andrés de la Gándara	Mayor	
1837	Francisco de P. Cabrera y Alderete	Prefect	
1838	José María Otaegui	Mayor	
1839	Francisco de P. Cabrera y Alderete	Prefect	
1840	José María Faz y Cardona	Prefect	
1841	José Mateo Terán	Prefect	
1842	José Mateo Terán	Prefect	
1843	José Eulogio Esnaurrízar	Prefect	Resigned in May
1844	Pablo de la Barrera	Prefect	
1845	Francisco Escalante	Prefect	
1845	Luzardo Lechón	Prefect	
1846	Juan Nepomuceno González	Prefect	
1847	Francisco Fregoso	Prefect	
1848	Mariano Martínez	Prefect	
1849	Silvestre López Portillo	Prefect	
1850	Silvestre López Portillo	Prefect	
1851	Silvestre López Portillo	Prefect	
1851	José Álvarez y Sagástegui	Prefect	
1852	Nicolás Mascorro	Prefect	
1853	José Álvarez y Sagastegui	Prefect	
1853	Nicolás Mascorro	Acting prefect	
1853	Eulalio Degollado	Prefect	
1854	General Pánfilo Barasroda	Prefect	
1855	General Pánfilo Barasroda	Prefect	
1855	Eulalio Degollado	Prefect	
1855	Manuel Vejo	President of the City Council	
1855	Camilo Bros	Prefect	
1855	Juan Othón	Prefect	
1855	Nicolás Mascorro	Mayor	
1856	Carlos María Escobar	Prefect	
1857	José María Aranda	Prefect	
1857	Francisco López de Nava	Acting prefect	
1858	Mariano Gordoa	Prefect	
1858	Nicolás Mascorro	Prefect	
1859	Pedro Diez Gutiérrez	Prefect	
1859	Ramón Calvillo	Mayor	
1860	Juan Othón	Prefect	
1860	Ambrosio Espinoza	Prefect	
1861	??	Prefect	
1862	??	Prefect	
1863	José Castillo	Acting prefect	
1864	José Castillo	Acting prefect	
1864	Nicolás Mascorro	Municipal prefect	Until August
1864	Pedro Diez Gutiérrez	Municipal prefect	
1865	Pedro Diez Gutiérrez	Municipal prefect	Ceased in June
1865	Nicolás Mascorro	Municipal prefect	Ceased in November
1865	Francisco Estrada	Municipal prefect	
1866	Francisco Estrada	Prefect municipal mayor	
1866	Octaviano Cabrera Lacavex	Prefec municipal mayor	16 March
1866	Juan Othón	Prefect municipal mayor	27 October
1866	Isidro Bustamante	Acting political chief	
1867	Toribio Saldaña	Political chief	
1867	Hilario Delgado	Political chief	
1868	José Trinidad Domínguez	Political chief	
1869	Rafael Montante	Political chief	
1870	Francisco de P. Palomo	Political chief	
1871	Lino Maldonado	Acting political chief	In May
1871	Florencio Cabrera Lacavex	President of the City Council	
1872	Manuel Muro	Political chief	
1872	Lino Maldonado	Political chief	
1873	Tomás Ortiz de Parada	President of the City Council	
1874	José Encarnación Ipiña	Political chief president	
1875	Agustín Álvarez	Proprietary political chief	
1876	Agustín Álvarez	Proprietary political chief	
1877	Antonio Espinoza y Cervantes	Proprietary political chief	
1877	Manuel Muro	Proprietary political chief	22 June
1878	Mónico Rubalcaba	Proprietary political chief	
1879	Nabor Macías	Proprietary political chief	
1880	Francisco Limón	Proprietary political chief	
1881	Indalecio Rodríguez	Proprietary political chief	
1882	Ladislao Tovar	Proprietary political chief	
1883	Matías Hernández Soberón	Proprietary political chief	
1884	Antonio Montero	Proprietary political chief	
1885	Macedonio Gómez	Proprietary political chief	
1886	Antonio Espinoza y Cervantes	Proprietary political chief	
1887	Antonio Espinoza y Cervantes	Proprietary political chief	
1888	Antonio Espinoza y Cervantes	Proprietary political chief	
1889	Antonio Espinoza y Cervantes	Proprietary political chief	
1890	Antonio Espinoza y Cervantes	Proprietary political chief	
1891	Francisco Bustamante	Proprietary political chief	
1892	Francisco Bustamante	Proprietary political chief	
1893	Francisco Bustamante	Proprietary political chief	
1894	Francisco Bustamante	Proprietary political chief	
1895	Francisco Bustamante	Proprietary political chief	
1896	Francisco Bustamante	Proprietary political chief	
1897	Blas Escontría Bustamante	Proprietary political chief	
1898	Blas Escontría Bustamante	Proprietary political chief	
1899	Pedro Barrenechea	Proprietary political chief	
1900	Pedro Barrenechea	Proprietary political chief	

Term	Municipal president	Political party	Notes
1901–1916	NA		
1917	Severino Martínez Gómez		
1919	Refugio T. Yáñez		
1921	Antonio Humara Acebo		
1922	Pedro Hernández		
1923	Pedro Hernández		
1925	Pedro Hernández		President of the Municipal Council
1926	Eugenio B. Jiménez		
1928–1929	Marcelino Zúñiga		
1931	Efrén González	PNR	
1932	Rutilio Alamilla	PNR	
1933	Vicente Segura	PNR	
1934–1935	Hipólito Cedillo	PNR	
1936–1937	José García Zamora	PNR	
1938	Ernesto Higuera	PNR	
1938	Alberto Z. Araujo		President of the Municipal Council
1939–1940	Manuel Parra López	PRM	
1940–1941	José L. Cerda	PRM	
1941–1943	Alfonso Viramontes	PRM	President of the Municipal Council
1943–1946	Ignacio Gómez del Campo	PRM	
1946	Antonio Garfias	PRI	Acting municipal president
1946–1949	Arturo Medina	PRI	
1949–1952	Agustín Olivo Monsiváis	PRI	
1952	Antonio Hernández Guerra	PRI	Acting municipal president
1952–1955	Nicólas Pérez Cerrillo	PRI	
1955	Socorro Blanc Ruiz	PRI	Acting municipal president
1955–1958	Alfonso Viramontes, Jr.	PRI	
1959–1960	Salvador Nava Martínez	Independent	
1960	Antonio Benavente Zarzosa		Acting municipal president
1961	Leonardo Hopper		President of the Municipal Council
1961–1964	Javier Silva Staines	PRI	
1964–1967	Manuel Hernández Muro	PRI	
1967–1970	Guillermo Fonseca Álvarez	PRI	
1970	Gabriel Echenique Portillo	PRI	Acting municipal president
1970–1973	Antonio Acebo Delgado	PRI	
1973–1976	Félix Dahuajare Torres	PRI	
1976–1979	Juan Antonio Ledezma Zavala	PRI	
1979–1982	Miguel Valladares García	PRI	
1982–1984	Salvador Nava Martínez	Frente Cívico Potosino (FCP); PAN; PDM	
1984–1985	María Guadalupe Rodríguez Cabrera	Frente Cívico Potosino (FCP); PAN; PDM	Acting municipal president
1985–1988	Guillermo Medina de los Santos	PRI	
1988–1991	Guillermo Pizzutto Zamanillo	Frente Cívico Potosino (FCP); PAN	
1991–1994	Mario Leal Campos	PAN	
1994	Rafael del Blanco Garrido	PRI	President of the Municipal Council
1995–1997	Luis García Julián	PRI	
1997–2000	Alejandro Zapata Perogordo	PAN	
2000	Gloria Rosillo Izquierdo	PAN	Acting municipal president
2000–2002	Marcelo de los Santos	PAN	
2002–2003	Homero González Reyes	PAN	Acting municipal president
2003	Jacobo Payán Latuff		President of the Municipal Council
2003–2006	Octavio Pedroza Gaitán	PAN	
2006–2009	Jorge Lozano Armengol	PAN	
2009–2012	Victoria Labastida Aguirre	PRI; PVEM; PSD	
2012	Emigdio Ilizaliturri Guzmán	PRI; PVEM; PSD	Acting municipal president
2012	Luis Miguel Ávalos Oyervides	PRI; PVEM; PSD	Acting municipal president
2012	Victoria Labastida Aguirre	PRI; PVEM; PSD	Resumed
2012–2015	Mario García Valdez	PRI; PVEM	Coalition "Compromise for San Luis"
2015–2018	Ricardo Gallardo Juárez	PRD; PT	
2018	Juan Carlos Torres Cedillo	PRD; PT	Acting municipal president
2018	Ricardo Gallardo Juárez	PRD; PT	Resumed
2018–14/11/2020	Xavier Nava Palacios	PAN	Applied for a temporary leave to run for reelection
15/11/2020–06/06/2021	Alfredo Lujambio Cataño	PAN	Acting municipal president
07/06/2021–30/09/2021	Xavier Nava Palacios	Morena	
01/10/2021–18/04/2024	Enrique Francisco Galindo Ceballos	PRI; PAN; PRD; PCP	Applied for a leave in order to run for reelection, which won
19/04/2024–30/06/2024	Alexandra Daniela Cid González	PAN	Acting municipal president
01/07/2024–30/09/2024	Enrique Francisco Galindo Ceballos	PRI; PAN; PRD; PCP	Resumed
01/10/2024–	Enrique Francisco Galindo Ceballos	PAN; PRI; PRD	Was reelected on 02/06/2024

== See also ==
- San Luis Potosí state election, 2018
- San Luis Potosí history
