= List of municipal presidents of San Luis Potosí =

The following is a list of municipal presidents of San Luis Potosí municipality, Mexico.

== List of officials ==
- Salvador Nava Martínez y Leonardo V. Hooper, 1959-1961
- Javier Silva Staines, 1962-1964
- Manuel Hernández Muro, 1965-1967
- Guillermo Fonseca Álvarez y Gabriel Echenique Portillo, 1968-1970
- Antonio Acebo Delgado, 1971-1973
- Félix Dahuajare Torres, 1974-1976
- J. Antonio Ledezma Zavala, 1977-1979
- Miguel Valladares García, 1980-1982
- Salvador Nava Martínez, 1983-1985
- Guillermo Medina de los Santos, 1986-1988
- Guillermo Pizzuto Zamanillo, 1989-1991
- Mario Leal Campos, 1992-1994
- Luis García Julián, 1994-1997
- Alejandro Zapata Perogordo, 1997-2000
- Jesús Marcelo de los Santos, 2000-2003
- Homero González Reyes, 2000-2003
- Ricardo Gallardo Juárez, 2015-2018
- Xavier Nava Palacios

== See also ==
- San Luis Potosí state election, 2018
- San Luis Potosí history
- List of mayors and municipal presidents of San Luis Potosí City
