= 2027 Mexican local elections =

- 6 June 2027

The 2027 Mexican local elections are scheduled to be held on 6 June 2027, concurrently with the 2027 federal elections. Voters will elect 17 governors, members of 31 local congresses, and numerous municipal authorities.

Gubernatorial elections will be held in the states of Baja California, Baja California Sur, Campeche, Colima, Guerrero, Michoacán, Nayarit, Quintana Roo, Sinaloa, Sonora, Tlaxcala and Zacatecas, currently governed by the National Regeneration Movement (Morena); in Aguascalientes, Chihuahua and Querétaro, currently governed by the National Action Party (PAN); in Nuevo León, currently governed by the Citizens' Movement (MC); and in San Luis Potosí, currently governed by the Green Ecological Party of Mexico (PVEM). Incumbents are not eligible for re-election and, with the exception of Sonora, the governors elected in 2027 will serve until 2033.

Mexico City and 30 of the nation's states will elect new local congresses. The exception is Coahuila, which held local elections in 2026. Members of local congresses serve three-year terms.

Municipal elections will be held in 29 states (excluding Durango and Veracruz, where municipal elections were held in 2025), alongside borough elections in Mexico City.

== Electoral system ==
Local elections in Mexico are organised by each state's own electoral institute, known collectively as Local Public Electoral Bodies (Organismos Públicos Locales Electorales, OPLEs), which are separate from the federal National Electoral Institute (INE). The OPLEs count the votes in local races, declare the elections valid, issue certificates to the winners, and run the preliminary results programme (PREP) for each state. When local and federal elections fall on the same day, the INE compiles the electoral roll, locates and staffs the polling stations, trains poll workers, allocates broadcast time to parties, and audits campaign spending in both sets of races. Voters cast their federal and local ballots at a single polling station. Challenges to local results are heard first by the electoral tribunal of each state, whose rulings may be appealed to the regional chambers of the Electoral Tribunal of the Federal Judiciary (TEPJF).

After the Chamber of Deputies rejected a broader electoral reform proposed by President Claudia Sheinbaum in March 2026, a narrower constitutional amendment known as "Plan B" was declared in force the following month; for local government, it capped the pay of OPLE and state electoral tribunal officials and limited the size of municipal councils. The elections of state judges and magistrates in 25 states, which under the 2024 judicial reform had been due to coincide with the 2027 vote, were moved to 4 June 2028 by a separate constitutional amendment declared in June 2026.

=== Gubernatorial elections ===
Each state's governor is elected by plurality voting in a single round. Governors may serve no more than six years and may not be re-elected. Inauguration dates are set by each state.

The governor of Sonora elected in 2027 will serve a three-year term, from 13 September 2027 to 12 September 2030, so that the state's gubernatorial elections coincide with presidential elections from 2030 onwards. The Supreme Court upheld the shortened term in 2023, finding that the federal constitution sets a maximum gubernatorial term but no minimum.

Under gender parity rules issued by the INE for each electoral cycle, parties must nominate women in a minimum number of the gubernatorial races.

=== Congressional elections ===
The 31 state congresses up for election have a combined 1,098 seats, up from 1,063 in 2021, as the Congress of Quintana Roo is now elected in the same cycle. The Congress of Coahuila, elected in June 2026, is the only one not renewed. Each congress combines deputies elected by plurality in single-member districts with others allocated by proportional representation from party lists, in proportions set by state law, and deputies serve three-year terms.

=== Municipal elections ===
Municipal councils (ayuntamientos) are made up of a municipal president, or mayor, together with a number of síndicos and regidores fixed by state law. Voters elect the whole council on a single slate headed by the mayoral candidate, and some regidores are then assigned by proportional representation. The Plan B amendment limited each council to one síndico and no more than fifteen regidores, reducing the number of municipal posts from 18,837 in 2021 to 18,424 in 2027.

Municipal elections are held in every state except Durango and Veracruz, which elect only their congresses in 2027; Coahuila, conversely, elects only its municipal councils. According to El Universal, 1,802 municipal councils and borough governments elected through the party system are contested. In Oaxaca, 152 municipalities elect their authorities through political parties on election day, while the remaining 418 choose them under indigenous normative systems according to their own calendars.

== Political parties ==
=== National parties ===
Eight national political parties hold registration for the 2027 elections. National parties may contest local elections once they are accredited by the electoral institute of each state.

Two of the eight, Building Societies of Peace (PAZ) and We Are (Somos), obtained registration from the INE in June 2026 and will contest their first election in 2027. As newly registered parties, neither may form a coalition or join a common candidacy in 2027. State institutes began accrediting them for local races in July 2026.

Party	Leader	Ideology
National Action Party	Jorge Romero Herrera	National conservatism; Christian democracy
Institutional Revolutionary Party	Alejandro Moreno Cárdenas	Catch-all politics
Ecologist Green Party of Mexico	Karen Castrejón Trujillo	Green politics
Labor Party	Alberto Anaya	Socialism; Maoism; Socialism of the 21st century
Citizens' Movement	Jorge Máynez	Social democracy; Participatory democracy; Progressivism
National Regeneration Movement	Ariadna Montiel Reyes	Anti-neoliberalism; Alter-globalization; Left-wing populism; Left-wing nationalism
Building Societies of Peace	Hugo Eric Flores Cervantes	Christian right
We Are	Guadalupe Acosta Naranjo	Progressivism; Social liberalism; Federalism

=== Local parties ===
Local parties are registered by the electoral institute of a single state and compete only there, and must show a minimum number of members to keep their registration. Five states registered new local parties in 2026: three in Chiapas, two in Veracruz, and one each in the State of Mexico, Morelos and Yucatán. Like the new national parties, newly registered local parties must compete alone in their first election.

As of September 2026, the following local parties held registration:

State	Party
Aguascalientes	Aguascalientes Labour Movement; Movimiento Laborista Aguascalientes
Aguascalientes	Power and Social Alternative; Poder y Alternativa Social
Aguascalientes	Alliance for the Prosperity of Aguascalientes; Alianza por la Prosperidad de Aguascalientes
Aguascalientes	Party of the Democratic Revolution Aguascalientes; Partido de la Revolución Democrática Aguascalientes
Baja California	Solidarity Encounter Party Baja California; Partido Encuentro Solidario Baja California
Baja California Sur	South Californian Renewal Party; Partido de Renovación Sudcaliforniana
Baja California Sur	New Alliance Baja California Sur; Nueva Alianza Baja California Sur
Baja California Sur	Force for Mexico Baja California Sur; Fuerza por México Baja California Sur
Baja California Sur	Labour Movement Baja California Sur; Movimiento Laborista Baja California Sur
Baja California Sur	Party of the Democratic Revolution Baja California Sur; Partido de la Revolución Democrática Baja California Sur
Baja California Sur	Humanist Party of Baja California Sur; Partido Humanista de Baja California Sur
Campeche	None
Chiapas	Progressive Social Networks Chiapas; Redes Sociales Progresistas Chiapas
Chiapas	Chiapas Hope Movement; Movimiento de Esperanza de Chiapas
Chiapas	Human Conscience Party; Partido Conciencia Humana
Chiapas	Chiapanecan Force; Fuerza Chiapaneca
Chihuahua	None
Coahuila	Democratic Unity of Coahuila; Unidad Democrática de Coahuila
Coahuila	New Ideas; Nuevas Ideas
Coahuila	Mexico Forward Coahuila; México Avante Coahuila
Colima	New Alliance Colima; Nueva Alianza Colima
Durango	Villista Party; Partido Villista
Durango	State Renewal Party; Partido Estatal Renovación
Durango	Solidarity Encounter Party Durango; Partido Encuentro Solidario Durango
Guanajuato	None
Guerrero	Party of the Democratic Revolution Guerrero; Partido de la Revolución Democrática Guerrero
Hidalgo	New Alliance Hidalgo; Nueva Alianza Hidalgo
Hidalgo	Solidarity Encounter Hidalgo; Encuentro Solidario Hidalgo
Hidalgo	Party of the Democratic Revolution Hidalgo; Partido de la Revolución Democrática Hidalgo
Jalisco	None
Mexico City	Party of the Democratic Revolution Mexico City; Partido de la Revolución Democrática Ciudad de México
State of Mexico	Party of the Democratic Revolution State of Mexico; Partido de la Revolución Democrática Estado de México
State of Mexico	Mexiquense Power of Social Opportunities; Poder Mexiquense de Oportunidades Sociales
Michoacán	Party of the Democratic Revolution Michoacán; Partido de la Revolución Democrática Michoacán
Morelos	New Alliance Morelos; Nueva Alianza Morelos
Morelos	Morelos Progresses; Morelos Progresa
Morelos	Party of the Democratic Revolution Morelos; Partido de la Revolución Democrática Morelos
Morelos	Citizen Welfare; Bienestar Ciudadano
Nayarit	New Alliance Nayarit; Nueva Alianza Nayarit
Nayarit	Rise Up for Nayarit Movement; Movimiento Levántate para Nayarit
Nayarit	Progressive Social Networks Nayarit; Redes Sociales Progresistas Nayarit
Nuevo León	VIDA NL; VIDA NL
Oaxaca	New Alliance Oaxaca; Nueva Alianza Oaxaca
Oaxaca	Oaxacan Transformation Party; Partido de la Transformación Oaxaqueña
Oaxaca	Party of the Democratic Revolution Oaxaca; Partido de la Revolución Democrática Oaxaca
Puebla	Social Integration Pact; Pacto Social de Integración
Puebla	New Alliance Puebla; Nueva Alianza Puebla
Puebla	Force for Mexico Puebla; Fuerza por México Puebla
Querétaro	None
Quintana Roo	Labour Movement Quintana Roo; Movimiento Laborista Quintana Roo
Quintana Roo	Progressing Social Networks in Quintana Roo; Redes Sociales Progresando en Quintana Roo
San Luis Potosí	New Alliance San Luis Potosí; Nueva Alianza San Luis Potosí
Sinaloa	Sinaloan Party; Partido Sinaloense
Sonora	New Alliance Sonora; Nueva Alianza Sonora
Sonora	Solidarity Encounter Sonora; Encuentro Solidario Sonora
Sonora	Sonoran Party; Partido Sonorense
Sonora	Party of the Democratic Revolution Sonora; Partido de la Revolución Democrática Sonora
Tabasco	Party of the Democratic Revolution Tabasco; Partido de la Revolución Democrática Tabasco
Tamaulipas	None
Tlaxcala	Citizens' Alliance Party; Partido Alianza Ciudadana
Tlaxcala	New Alliance Party Tlaxcala; Partido Nueva Alianza Tlaxcala
Tlaxcala	Progressive Social Networks Tlaxcala; Redes Sociales Progresistas Tlaxcala
Tlaxcala	Force for Mexico Tlaxcala; Fuerza por México Tlaxcala
Tlaxcala	Party of the Democratic Revolution Tlaxcala; Partido de la Revolución Democrática Tlaxcala
Veracruz	Generational Alliance for Veracruz; Alianza Generacional por Veracruz
Veracruz	Cardenista Party; Partido Cardenista
Yucatán	New Alliance Yucatán; Nueva Alianza Yucatán
Yucatán	Social Commitment; Compromiso Social
Zacatecas	New Alliance Zacatecas; Nueva Alianza Zacatecas
Zacatecas	Party of the Democratic Revolution Zacatecas; Partido de la Revolución Democrática Zacatecas

== Aguascalientes ==
- Governor of Aguascalientes, Congress of Aguascalientes (27 seats), 12 municipal governments

Incumbent governor María Teresa Jiménez Esquivel (PAN) was elected in 2022 for a five-year term, to align the state and federal electoral calendars.

Senator Nora Ruvalcaba Gámez will probably be Morena's candidate for the governorship.

== Baja California ==
- Governor of Baja California, Congress of Baja California (25 seats), 7 municipal governments

Senator Julieta Ramírez Padilla will probably be Morena's candidate for the governorship.

== Baja California Sur ==
- Governor of Baja California Sur, Congress of Baja California Sur (21 seats), 5 municipal governments

Manuel Cota Cárdenas of the PVEM, the incumbent federal deputy for BCS-01 and son of former governor Leonel Cota Montaño, will probably be the PVEM-Morena candidate for the governorship.

== Campeche ==
- Governor of Campeche, Congress of Campeche (35 seats), 13 municipal governments

Pablo Gutiérrez Lazarus, a three-term municipal president of Carmen, Campeche, will probably be Morena's candidate for the governorship.

== Chiapas ==
- Congress of Chiapas (40 seats), 123 municipal governments

== Chihuahua ==
- Governor of Chihuahua, Congress of Chihuahua (33 seats), 67 municipal governments

Cruz Pérez Cuéllar, a two-term municipal president of Juárez, Chihuahua, will probably be Morena's candidate for the governorship.

== Coahuila ==
- 38 municipal governments

== Colima ==
- Governor of Colima, Congress of Colima (25 seats), 10 municipal governments

Rosa María Bayardo Cabrera, a former muncipal president of Manzanillo, Colima, will probably be Morena's candidate for the governorship.

== Durango ==
- Congress of Durango (25 seats)

== Guanajuato ==
- Congress of Guanajuato (36 seats), 46 municipal governments

== Guerrero ==
- Governor of Guerrero, Congress of Guerrero (46 seats), 85 municipal governments

Senator Beatriz Mojica Morga will probably be Morena's candidate for the governorship.

== Hidalgo ==
- Congress of Hidalgo (30 seats), 84 municipal governments

== Jalisco ==
- Congress of Jalisco (38 seats), 125 municipal governments

== Mexico City ==
- Congress of Mexico City (66 seats), all 16 borough mayors and borough councils. Mayors of the capital's boroughs are eligible for re-election.

== State of Mexico ==
- Congress of the State of Mexico (75 seats), 125 municipal governments

== Michoacán ==
- Governor of Michoacán, Congress of Michoacán (40 seats), 112 municipal governments

Carlos Torres Piña, a former federal deputy and attorney-general of Michoacán, will probably be Morena's candidate for the governorship.

== Morelos ==
- Congress of Morelos (20 seats), 36 municipal governments

== Nayarit ==
- Governor of Nayarit, Congress of Nayarit (30 seats), 20 municipal governments

Senator Jasmine Bugarín Rodríguez of the PVEM will probably be the PVEM/Morena candidate for the governorship.

== Nuevo León ==
- Governor of Nuevo León, Congress of Nuevo León (42 seats), 51 municipal governments

Clara Luz Flores, who previously competed for the position in 2021, will probably be Morena's candidate for the governorship.

== Oaxaca ==
- Congress of Oaxaca (42 seats), 153 municipal governments

== Puebla ==
- Congress of Puebla (41 seats), 217 municipal governments

== Querétaro ==
- Governor of Querétaro, Legislature of Querétaro (25 seats), 18 municipal governments

Santiago Nieto Castillo, a former head of the federal Financial Intelligence Unit, will probably be Morena's candidate for the governorship.

== Quintana Roo ==
- Governor of Quintana Roo, Congress of Quintana Roo (25 seats), 11 municipal governments

Incumbent governor Mara Lezama Espinosa (Morena) was elected in 2022 for a five-year term, to align the state and federal electoral calendars.

Senator Eugenio Segura Vázquez will probably be Morena's candidate for the governorship.

== San Luis Potosí ==
- Governor of San Luis Potosí, Congress of San Luis Potosí (27 seats), 58 municipal governments

Incumbent governor Ricardo Gallardo announced his wife, Senator Ruth González Silva, as the PVEM's gubernatorial candidate in July 2026.

Former senator Elí César Cervantes Rojas will probably be Morena's candidate for the governorship.

== Sinaloa ==
- Governor of Sinaloa, Congress of Sinaloa (40 seats), 20 municipal governments

Senator Imelda Castro Castro will probably be Morena's candidate for the governorship.

== Sonora ==
- Governor of Sonora, Congress of Sonora (33 seats), 72 municipal governments

Exceptionally, in order to align the gubernatorial and presidential electoral calendars, the governor of Sonora elected in 2027 will serve only a three-year term.

Senator Lorenia Valles Sampedro will probably be Morena's candidate for the governorship.

== Tabasco ==
- Congress of Tabasco (35 seats), 17 municipal governments

== Tamaulipas ==
- Congress of Tamaulipas (36 seats), 43 municipal governments

== Tlaxcala ==
- Governor of Tlaxcala, Congress of Tlaxcala (25 seats), 60 municipal governments

Senator Ana Lilia Rivera Rivera will probably be Morena's candidate for the governorship.

== Veracruz ==
- Congress of Veracruz (50 seats)

== Yucatán ==
- Congress of Yucatán (35 seats), 106 municipal governments

== Zacatecas ==
- Governor of Zacatecas, Congress of Zacatecas (30 seats), 58 municipal governments

Senator Verónica Díaz Robles will probably be Morena's candidate for the governorship.
