= Gonzalo Martínez Corbalá =

Mexican politician

Director-General of the Institute for Social Security and Services for State Workers
- In office 4 January 1993 – 1994
- Preceded by: Emilio Lozoya
- Succeeded by: Manuel Aguilera Gómez

Governor of San Luis Potosí
- In office 10 October 1991 – 9 October 1992
- Preceded by: Fausto Zapata
- Succeeded by: Teófilo Torres Corzo

Director-General of the Instituto del Fondo Nacional de la Vivienda para los Trabajadores
- In office 3 January 1991 – 10 October 1991
- Preceded by: Emilio Gamboa Patrón
- Succeeded by: José Juan de Olloqui y Labastida

Speaker of the Chamber of Deputies
- In office 1 November 1990 – 30 November 1990
- Preceded by: María Elena Chapa Hernández
- Succeeded by: Fernando Córdoba Lobo

Member of the Chamber of Deputies
- In office 1 September 1988 – December 1990
- Preceded by: Guillermo Pizzuto Zamanillo
- Succeeded by: Antonio Sánchez Morales
- Constituency: San Luis Potosí's 6th
- In office 1 September 1964 – 31 August 1967
- Preceded by: Guadalupe Rivera Marín
- Succeeded by: María Guadalupe Aguirre Soria
- Constituency: Federal District's 22nd

Senator
- In office 1 September 1982 – 31 August 1988
- Preceded by: Rafael Tristán López
- Succeeded by: Carlos Jonguitud Barrios
- Constituency: San Luis Potosí

Ambassador to Cuba
- In office 1980–1982

Ambassador to Chile
- In office 1972–1974

Personal details
- Born: 10 March 1928 San Luis Potosí
- Died: 15 October 2017 (aged 89) Mexico City
- Party: Institutional Revolutionary Party
- Occupation: politician
- Profession: engineer

Gonzalo Martínez Corbalá (10 March 1928 – 15 October 2017) was a Mexican politician and diplomat.

A member of the Institutional Revolutionary Party (PRI) who served for a time as president of the party's Mexico City chapter, Martínez Corbalá was first elected to the Chamber of Deputies in 1964 and served until 1967, representing the Federal District's 22nd congressional district. He was ambassador to Chile between 1972 and 1974 when he witnessed the 1973 Chilean coup d'état against Salvador Allende. Martínez Corbalá was appointed ambassador to Cuba, from 1980 to 1982. He sat in the Senate for two terms, between 1982 and 1988, when he returned to the Chamber of Deputies, representing San Luis Potosí's 6th district. Near the end of 1990, Martínez Corbalá was named the director-general of the Instituto del Fondo Nacional de la Vivienda para los Trabajadores, and took office as governor of San Luis Potosí in 1991. He stepped down in 1992, and later led the Institute for Social Security and Services for State Workers (ISSSTE) between 1993 and 1994. In 1992, the government of Chile awarded Martínez Corbalá the Grand Cross of the Order of Merit.

He was the president of the Chamber of Deputies in 1990.

Outside of politics, Martínez Corbalá was president of the Association of Engineers. He died at the age of 89 on 15 October 2017.
