= Pablo Gutiérrez Lazarus =

Mexican politician

Pablo Gutiérrez Lazarus (born 29 August 1983) is a Mexican politician, member of the National Regeneration Movement (Morena). Born in Mexico City, he served as the municipal president of Carmen Municipality, Campeche, between 2015 to 2018 as member of the National Action Party (PAN), and from 2021 to 2026 as member of Morena.

In 2026, Morena announced him as the "state coordinator for the defense of the transformation and national sovereignty", a position expected to represent the party in the Campeche gubernatorial election of 6 June 2027.
