= Alejandro Zapata Perogordo =

Mexican politician

- Born: 20 November 1958 (age 67); San Luis Potosí, San Luis Potosí, Mexico
- Occupations: Deputy and Senator
- Political party: PAN

José Alejandro Zapata Perogordo (born 20 November 1958) is a Mexican politician affiliated with the PAN. As of 2013 he served as Senator of the LX and LXI Legislatures of the Mexican Congress representing San Luis Potosí. He also served as Deputy during the LVIII Legislature.

== See also ==
- List of presidents of San Luis Potosí Municipality

Preceded by Luis García Julián	Municipal President of San Luis Potosí; 1997–2000	Succeeded by Gloria Rosillo Izquierdo
Preceded by Jorge Lozano Armengol	San Luis Potosí Senator; 2006–2012	Succeeded by César Octavio Pedroza Gaitán
Preceded by	Diputies by the II District of San Luis Potosí; 1994–1997	Succeeded by Juan Gaitán Infante
