= 22nd federal electoral district of Mexico City =

Federal electoral district of Mexico

Mexico City's 22nd
- Electoral district of the Chamber of Deputies of Mexico

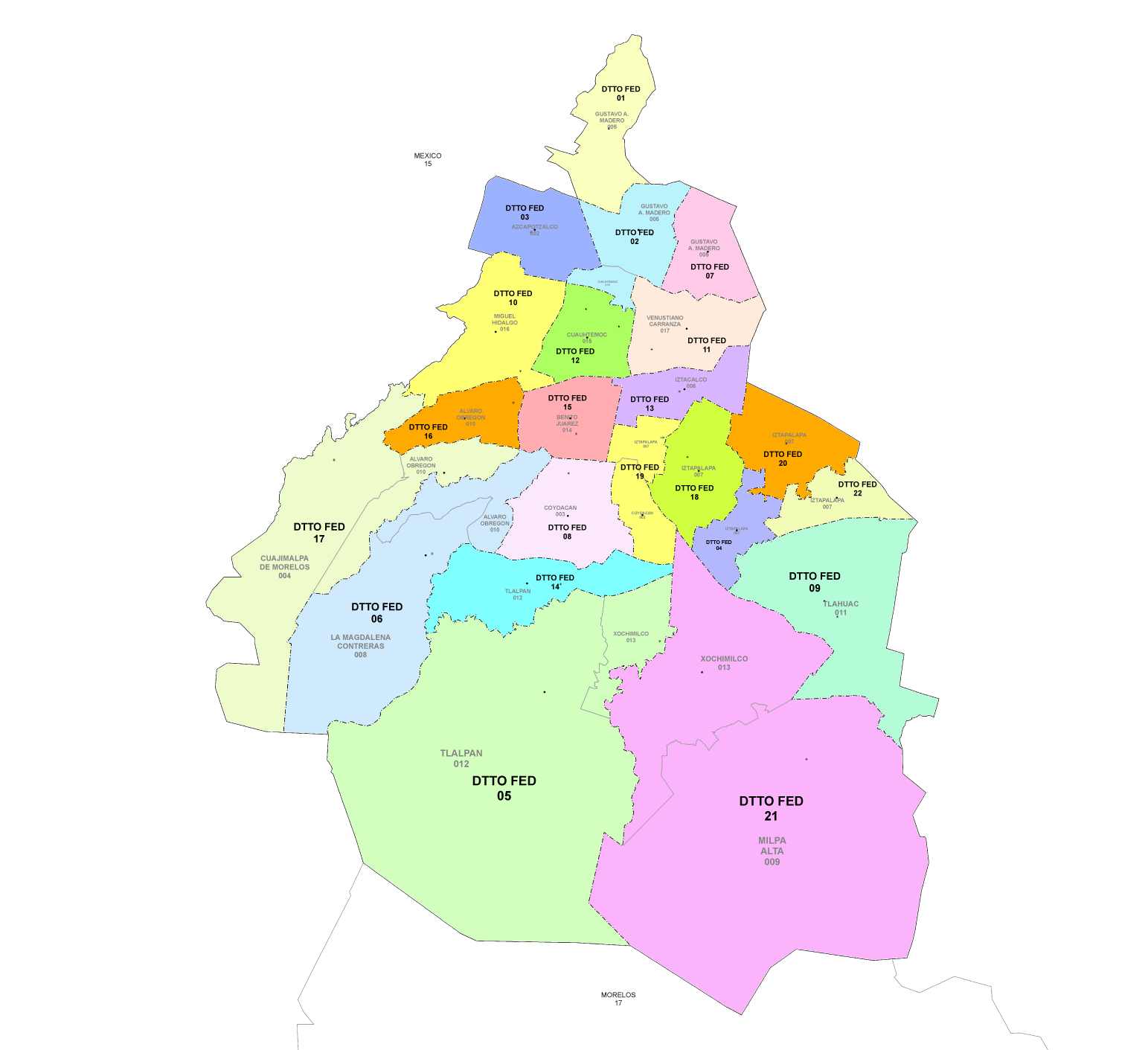
- 22nd district since 2023

Incumbent
- Member: Marisela Zúñiga Cerón
- Party: ▌Morena
- Congress: 66th (2024–2027)

District
- State: Mexico City
- Head town: Iztapalapa
- Coordinates: 19°21′30″N 99°05′35″W
- Covers: Iztapalapa (part)
- PR region: Fourth
- Precincts: 150
- Population: 383,691 (2020 census)

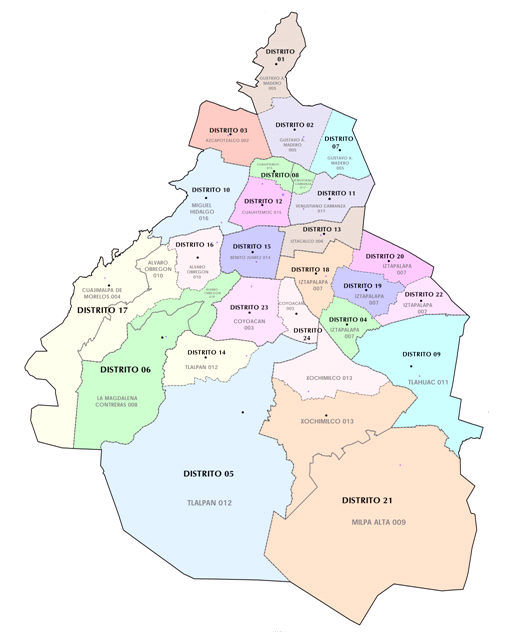
Mexico City under the 2017–2022 districting plan

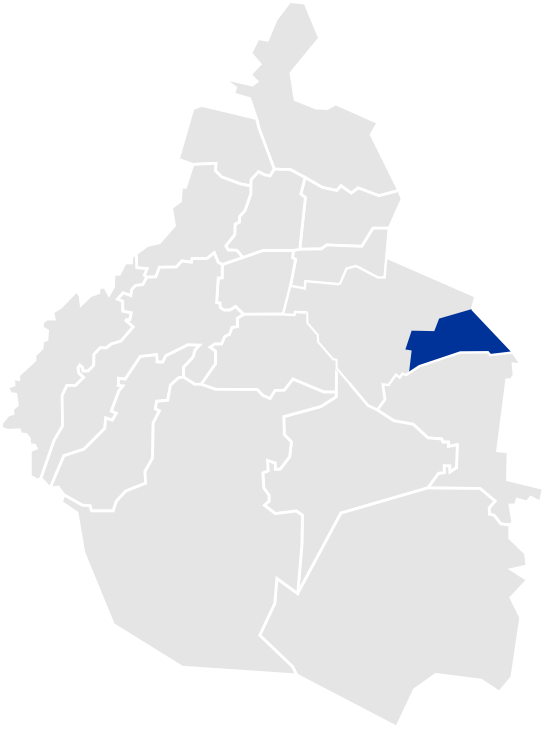
2005–2017 22nd district shaded blue

The 22nd federal electoral district of Mexico City (Spanish: Distrito electoral federal 22 de la Ciudad de México; previously "of the Federal District") is one of the 300 electoral districts into which Mexico is divided for elections to the federal Chamber of Deputies and one of the 22 currently operational districts in Mexico City.

It elects one deputy to the lower house of Congress for each three-year legislative session by means of the first-past-the-post system. Votes cast in the district also count towards the calculation of proportional representation ("plurinominal") deputies elected from the fourth region.

The current member for the district, elected in the 2024 general election, is Marisela Zúñiga Cerón of the National Regeneration Movement (Morena).

== District territory ==
Under the 2023 districting plan adopted by the National Electoral Institute (INE), which is to be used for the 2024, 2027 and 2030 federal elections, the 22nd district covers 150 electoral precincts (secciones electorales) across the south-eastern portion of the borough of Iztapalapa.

The district reported a population of 383,691 in the 2020 census.

== Previous districting schemes ==
Evolution of electoral district numbers
	1974	1978	1996	2005	2017	2023
Mexico City (Federal District)	27	40	30	27	24	22
Chamber of Deputies	196	300				

2017–2022

In the 2017 plan, the 22nd district comprised 146 precincts in the south-east of Iztapalapa.

2005–2017

Between 2005 and 2017, the district covered 152 precincts in the south-east of Iztapalapa.

1996–2005

Under the 1996 scheme, the district covered 206 precincts in the south-east of Iztapalapa.

1978–1996

The districting scheme in force from 1978 to 1996 was the result of the 1977 electoral reforms, which increased the number of single-member seats in the Chamber of Deputies from 196 to 300. Under that plan, the Federal District's seat allocation rose from 27 to 40. The 22nd district comprised portions of the boroughs of Coyoacán, Álvaro Obregón and Tlalpan.

== Deputies returned to Congress ==
(Mexico) National parties
- Current
- PAN
- PRI
- PT
- PVEM
- MC
- Morena
- PAZ
- Somos
- Defunct or local only
- PLM
- PNR
- PRM
- PNM
- PP
- PPS
- PARM
- PFCRN
- CON
- PANAL
- PSD
- PES
- PES
- PRD

Mexico City's 22nd district
Election	Deputy	Party	Term	Legislature
1961	Guadalupe Rivera Marín	Institutional Revolutionary Party	1961–1964	45th Congress
1964	Gonzalo Martínez Corbalá	Institutional Revolutionary Party	1964–1967	46th Congress
1967	María Guadalupe Aguirre Soria	Institutional Revolutionary Party	1967–1970	47th Congress
1970	Guillermina Sánchez Meza	Institutional Revolutionary Party	1970–1973	48th Congress
1973	Arturo González Cosío Díaz	Institutional Revolutionary Party	1973–1976	49th Congress
1976	Ifigenia Martínez	Institutional Revolutionary Party	1976–1979	50th Congress
1979	Enrique González Flores	Institutional Revolutionary Party	1979–1982	51st Congress
1982	José Carreño Carlón	Institutional Revolutionary Party	1982–1985	52nd Congress
1985	Juan José Castillo Mota	Institutional Revolutionary Party	1985–1988	53rd Congress
1988	Rosario Guerra Díaz	Institutional Revolutionary Party	1988–1991	54th Congress
1991	Juan José Castillo Mota	Institutional Revolutionary Party	1991–1994	55th Congress
1994	Víctor Manuel Álvarez Trasviña	Institutional Revolutionary Party	1994–1997	56th Congress
1997	Clara Brugada	Party of the Democratic Revolution	1997–2000	57th Congress
2000	Estevan Daniel González Enríquez	Party of the Democratic Revolution	2000–2003	58th Congress
2003	Francisco Diego Aguilar	Party of the Democratic Revolution	2003–2006	59th Congress
2006	Víctor Varela López	Party of the Democratic Revolution	2006–2009	60th Congress
2009	Arturo Santana Alfaro	Party of the Democratic Revolution	2009–2012	61st Congress
2012	Purificación Carpinteyro	Party of the Democratic Revolution	2012–2015	62nd Congress
2015	Ana Leticia Carrera Hernández	National Regeneration Movement	2015–2018	63rd Congress
2018	Víctor Varela López	National Regeneration Movement	2018–2021	64th Congress
2021	Víctor Varela López	National Regeneration Movement	2021–2024	65th Congress
2024	Marisela Zúñiga Cerón	National Regeneration Movement	2024–2027	66th Congress

== Presidential elections ==
Mexico City's 22nd district
Election	District won by	Party or coalition	%
2018	Andrés Manuel López Obrador	Juntos Haremos Historia	66.6414
2024	Claudia Sheinbaum Pardo	Sigamos Haciendo Historia	77.9404
