= Ruth González Silva =

Mexican politician (born 1986)

González Silva in 2019

Ruth Miriam González Silva de Gallardo (Note: In this Mexican name, the first or paternal surname is González, the second or maternal surname is Silva and, for married women, the optional marital name is de Gallardo.) (born 6 August 1986) is a Mexican politician affiliated with the Ecologist Green Party of Mexico (PVEM). She was elected to the Senate for the state of San Luis Potosí in the 2024 general election and has been announced as her party's prospective candidate for the governorship of San Luis Potosí in the 2027 election.

== Political career ==
Ruth González Silva was born in San Luis Potosí, San Luis Potosí, in 1986. She holds a bachelor's degree in communication science.

She ran unsuccessfully for the Senate in the 2018 election on the Party of the Democratic Revolution (PRD) ticket but, in the 2024 general election, representing the PVEM, she was elected to San Luis Potosí's first Senate seat for the 2024–2030 term.

On 13 July 2026, Ricardo Gallardo, the incumbent governor of San Luis Potosí, announced her as the PVEM's candidate to succeed him in the gubernatorial election of 6 June 2027. Gallardo is González's husband, but he refuted claims that her nomination was an act of nepotism and argued that the recently adopted constitutional amendment prohibiting family members of current officeholders from seeking the same elected position is not scheduled to take effect until 2030.

== Personal life ==
González Silva is married to Ricardo Gallardo, who was elected to a six-year term as governor of San Luis Potosí in 2021. They have two children.
