= Guillermo Fonseca Álvarez =

Mexican politician (1933–2026)

Member of the Chamber of Deputies of Mexico
- In office 1 September 1985 – 31 August 1988
- Preceded by: Guillermo Dávila Martínez
- Succeeded by: José Luis Luege Tamargo
- Constituency: Federal District's 17th
- In office 1 September 1967 – 30 September 1967
- Preceded by: Luis Tudón Hurtado
- Succeeded by: Fausto Zapata Loredo
- Constituency: San Luis Potosí's 4th

Governor of San Luis Potosí
- In office 26 September 1973 – 25 September 1979
- Preceded by: Antonio Rocha Cordero
- Succeeded by: Carlos Jonguitud Barrios

Member of the Senate of the Republic for San Luis Potosí
- In office 1 September 1970 – 19 February 1973

Personal details
- Born: 22 June 1933 San Luis Potosí, Mexico
- Died: 15 January 2026 (aged 92) San Luis Potosí, Mexico
- Party: PRI
- Education: Universidad Autónoma de San Luis Potosí (Lic.)
- Occupation: Academic

Guillermo Fonseca Álvarez (Note: In this Hispanic American name, the first or paternal surname is Fonseca and the second or maternal family name is Álvarez.) (22 June 1933 – 15 January 2026) was a Mexican politician from the Institutional Revolutionary Party (PRI). He was elected to both chambers of Congress and, in 1973, to a six-year term as governor of San Luis Potosí.

== Early life and education ==
Guillermo Fonseca Álvarez was born in San Luis Potosí, on 22 June 1933 to Ignacio Fonseca Macías and Pilar Álvarez. After primary education in Mexico City, he returned to San Luis Potosí for his secondary and university education, where he earned a degree in law from the Autonomous University of San Luis Potosí (UASLP). He later taught history, geography, Spanish and introductory law courses at the UASLP.

== Political career ==
Fonseca served in the Chamber of Deputies for San Luis Potosí's 4th district from September to December 1967 (47th Congress) before resigning to take office as municipal president of San Luis Potosí; he was replaced for the remainder of his term by his alternate, Fausto Zapata Loredo.

He served in the Senate of the Republic for San Luis Potosí from 1970 to 1973 and later as governor of San Luis Potosí from 1973 to 1979.

In the 1985 midterms he returned to the Chamber of Deputies for the Federal District's 17th congressional district (53rd Congress).

Fonseca died in the city of San Luis Potosí on 15 January 2026, at the age of 92.
