= Víctor Varela López =

Mexican politician

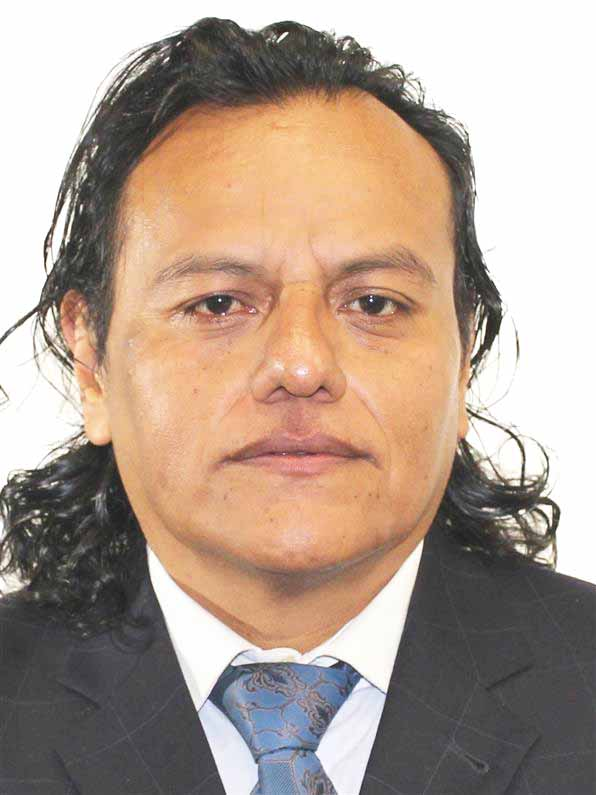
- Víctor Varela López in 2018
- Born: 20 April 1973 (age 53); Mexico City, Mexico
- Occupation: Politician
- Political party: MORENA

Víctor Gabriel Varela López (born 20 April 1973) is a Mexican politician affiliated with Morena, who has served as a federal deputy in the LXIV and LXV Legislatures of the Mexican Congress, representing Mexico City's 22nd District. Between 2006 and 2009 he was a deputy of the LX Legislature from the Party of the Democratic Revolution, representing the same district in what was then the Federal District.
