= Juan Manuel Carreras =

Mexican politician

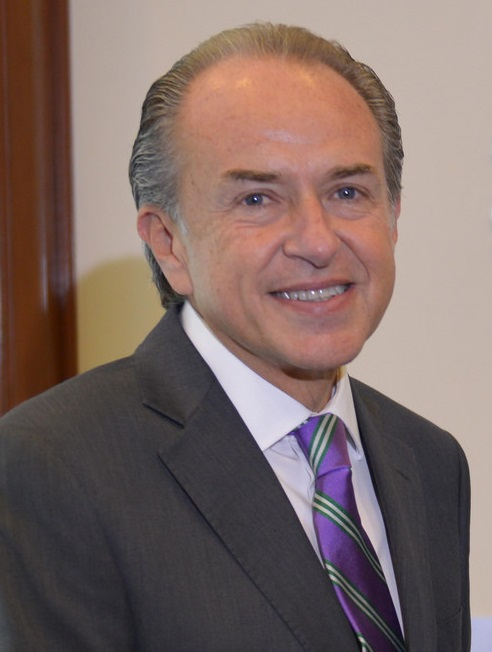

Governor of San Luis Potosí
- In office 26 September 2015 – 25 September 2021
- Preceded by: Fernando Toranzo Fernández
- Succeeded by: Ricardo Gallardo Cardona

Deputy of the Congress of the Union for the 1st district of San Luis Potosí
- In office 1 September 2000 – 31 August 2003
- Preceded by: Juana González Ortiz
- Succeeded by: Alfonso Nava Díaz

Personal details
- Born: 24 April 1962 (age 64) Charcas, San Luis Potosí
- Party: Institutional Revolutionary Party
- Education: Escuela Libre de Derecho (LLB); National Autonomous University of Mexico (PhD)
- Profession: Lawyer

Juan Manuel Carreras López (born 24 April 1962) is a Mexican politician from the Institutional Revolutionary Party (PRI).

From 2000 to 2003 he served in the Chamber of Deputies during the 58th Congress representing San Luis Potosí's first district. He also served as Secretary of Education of the state of San Luis Potosí.

In January 2015 he was designated by the PRI Party as candidate for governor of San Luis Potosí. Later, he won the elections and he was sworn as governor on 26 September 2015 for a six-year term.

He has more than 68,000 followers on Twitter.

Political offices
Preceded by Fernando Toranzo Fernández	Governor of San Luis Potosí; 2015–2021	Succeeded by Ricardo Gallardo Cardona
