= Jesús Marcelo de los Santos =

Mexican politician

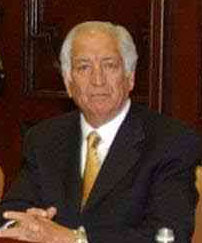

Governor of San Luis Potosí
- In office September 26, 2003 – September 25, 2009
- Preceded by: Fernando Silva Nieto
- Succeeded by: Fernando Toranzo Fernández

Personal details
- Born: San Luis Potosí, San Luis Potosí
- Party: National Action Party (PAN)
- Profession: Certified Public Accountant

Jesús Marcelo de los Santos Fraga (born December 15, 1948) is a Mexican politician, member of the PAN party, and Governor of the state of San Luis Potosí (2003–2009).

Marcelo de los Santos studied public accounting at Universidad Autónoma de San Luis Potosí (UASLP), and has spent most of his life practising his profession in a variety of organizations. He was heavily questioned regarding his involvement in the 1999 bankruptcy of the credit union "UNICRER", where his competence was seriously scrutinized. He was also a soccer player and a lecturer at UASLP.

In 1997 he joined the PAN and was a candidate for governor of San Luis Potosí, losing by a single percentage point. He was municipal president of the capital, also named San Luis Potosí, from 2000 to 2003. In 2003 he ran for governor again, and this time he won the election.

As governor, the state of San Luis Potosi became more industrialized and this can be seen with many new plants like the GM San Luis Potosí Assembly. He also built the new Centro de Convenciones, which is one of the biggest in Mexico. The Museo Laberinto de las Ciencias y de las Artes, an interactive museum for children and teens, was also built during his governorship.

During his period as governor President Felipe Calderon declared war on drugs. Despite increasing violence in most parts of Mexico during the years 2006-2009 the state of San Luis Potosi remained one of the safest states in Mexico and one of the least affected by drug violence. His term ended in 2009 and Fernando Toranzo Fernandez became governor of San Luis Potosi.

== Power Abuse Controversy ==
In 2022, a big controversy arose as still having power and having control of his home state Fiscal, as one of his grandsons Marcelo de los Santos Pizzuto was accused of raping women across different states without confronting justice after multiple lawsuits were brought up in their home state of San Luis Potosi. It was until a different state Fiscal took action on such lawsuits and the grandson of Marcelo de los Santos Fraga was finally arrested in San Luis Potosi and transported to state prison in Cereso Las Cruces in Acapulco, state of Guerrero, where he faces multiple charges of rape.

Evelina Ramírez Venegas, control judge of the Judicial Power of the state of Guerrero, ordered preventive detention against De Los Santos Pizzuto.

== Cabinet ==
OFFICE	NAME	TERM
Governor	Jesús Marcelo de los Santos	2003–
Government General Secretary	Alfonso José Castillo Machuca
General Attorney	Francisco Martin Camberos Hernández

== See also ==
- List of Mexican governors
- List of presidents of San Luis Potosí Municipality

Preceded by Fernando Silva Nieto	Governor of San Luis Potosí; 2003 - 2009	Succeeded by Fernando Toranzo Fernández
Preceded by Gloria Rosillo Izquierdo	Municipal President of San Luis Potosí, San Luis Potosí; 2000 - 2002	Succeeded by Homero González Reyes
