= César Octavio Pedroza Gaitán =

Mexican politician

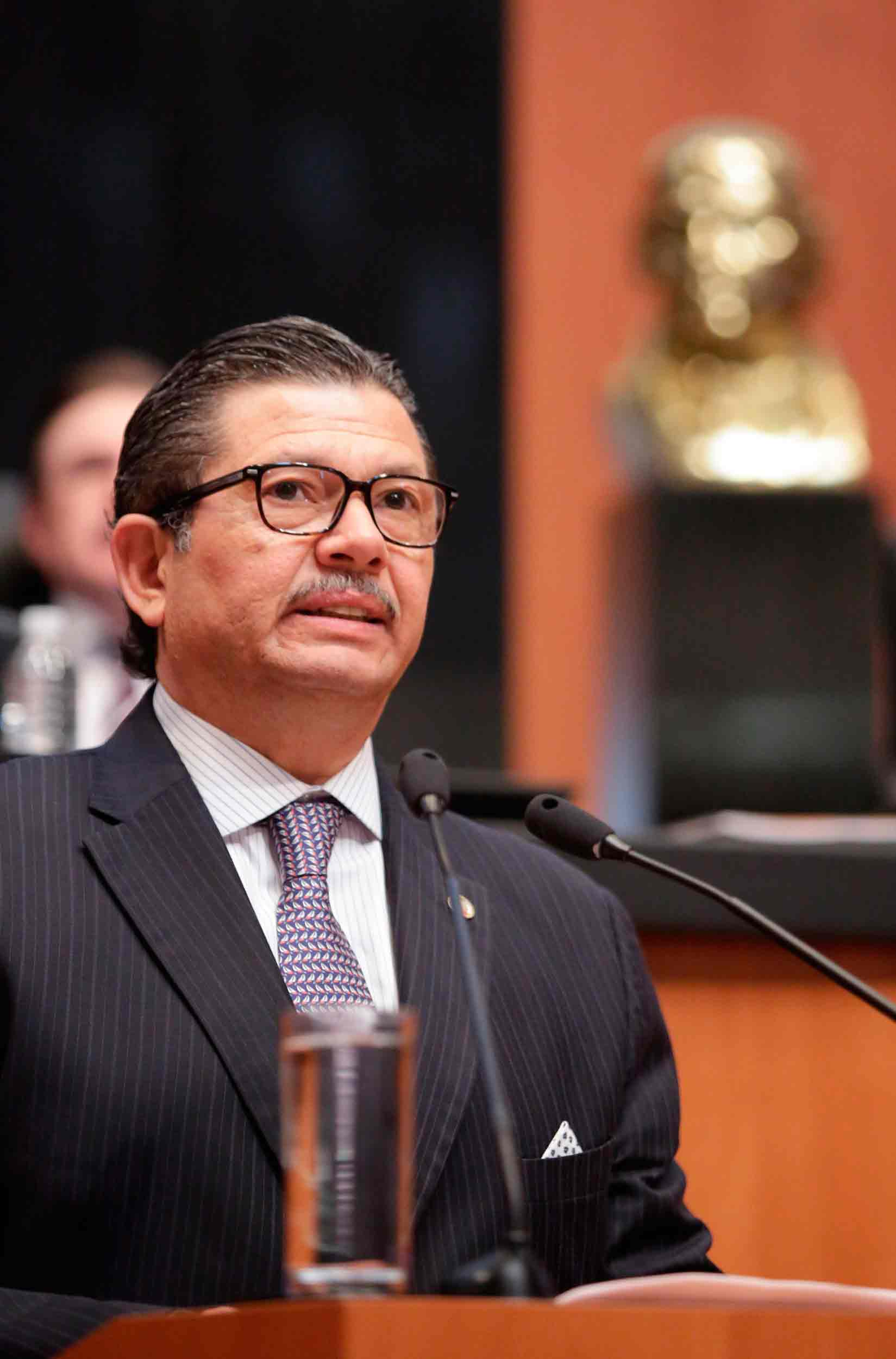

Personal details
- Born: 20 May 1959 (age 66) San Luis Potosí, San Luis Potosí, Mexico
- Party: National Action Party
- Occupation: Politician

César Octavio Pedroza Gaitán (born 20 May 1959) is a Mexican politician affiliated with the National Action Party (PAN).

He was a senator for the state of San Luis Potosí in the 62nd and 63rd sessions of Congress (2012–2018). He also served as a federal deputy for San Luis Potosí's 5th district during the 61st Congress (2009–2012) and was the mayor of the city of San Luis Potosí from 2004 to 2006.

Preceded by Jacobo Payán Latuff	Municipal President of San Luis Potosí; 2003–2006	Succeeded by Jorge Lozano Armengol
