= Guadalupe Rivera Marín =

Mexican politician (1924–2023)

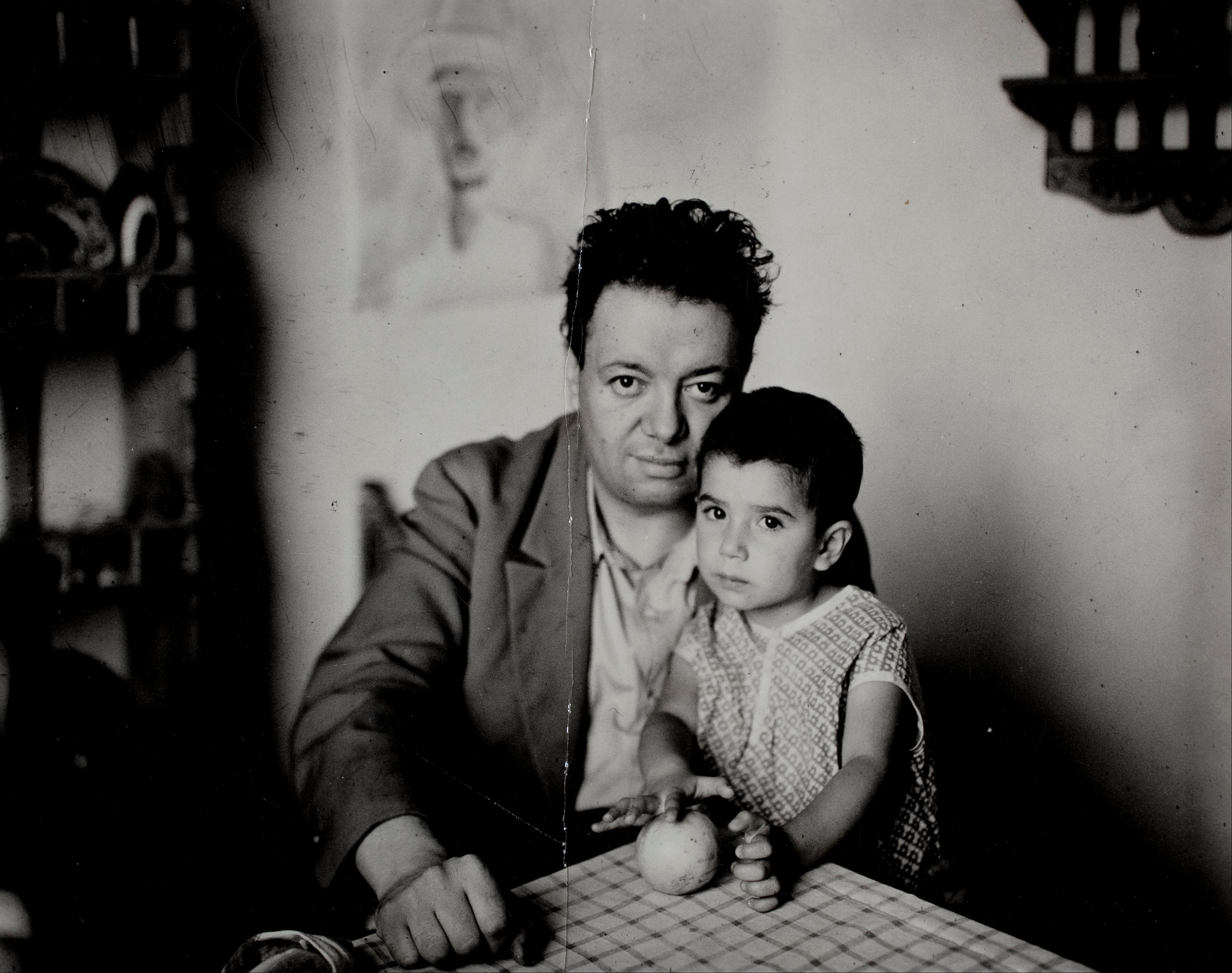
- Rivera Marín with her father in 1927

Borough president of Álvaro Obregón, D.F.
- In office 1997–2000

Senator for Guanajuato
- In office 3 September 1984 – 31 August 1988
- Preceded by: Agustín Téllez Cruces
- Succeeded by: José de Jesús Padilla Padilla

Member of the Chamber of Deputies
- In office 1 September 1979 – 31 August 1982
- Preceded by: Donaciano Luna Hernández
- Succeeded by: Salvador Rocha Díaz
- Constituency: Guanajuato's 9th

Member of the Chamber of Deputies
- In office 1 September 1961 – 31 August 1964
- Preceded by: constituency established
- Succeeded by: Gonzalo Martínez Corbalá
- Constituency: Federal District's 22nd

Personal details
- Born: 23 October 1924 Mexico City, Mexico
- Died: 15 January 2023 (aged 98)
- Party: PRI
- Education: National Autonomous University of Mexico
- Occupation: Lawyer

Guadalupe Rivera Marín (Note: In this Mexican name, the surname is Rivera and the second or maternal family name is Marín.) (23 October 1924 – 15 January 2023) was a Mexican lawyer and politician. A member of the Institutional Revolutionary Party (PRI), she served in the Chamber of Deputies from 1961 to 1964, for the Federal District's 22nd district, and again from 1979 to 1982, for Guanajuato's 9th district. She was also a Senator for Guanajuato from 1984 to 1988 and the borough president of Álvaro Obregón, Mexico City, from 1997 to 2000.

She was the daughter of Diego Rivera and his second wife, Guadalupe Marín.

Rivera died on 15 January 2023, at the age of 98.
