= Fernando Toranzo Fernández =

Mexican politician

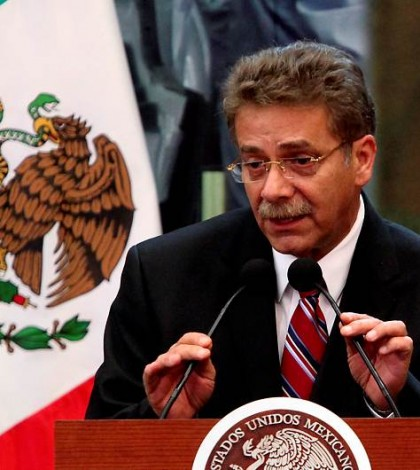

Governor of San Luis Potosí
- In office September 26, 2009 – September 25, 2015
- Preceded by: Jesús Marcelo de los Santos
- Succeeded by: Juan Manuel Carreras López

Personal details
- Born: September 12, 1950 (age 75) Venado, San Luis Potosí
- Party: Institutional Revolutionary Party
- Spouse: Dr. Maria Luisa Ramos Segura
- Profession: Doctor

Fernando Toranzo Fernández (born September 12, 1950) is a Mexican politician PRI who served as the Governor of San Luis Potosí (2009-2015). He formerly served as the Health Secretary of San Luis Potosi.

Toranzo Fernández was born in Venado, San Luis Potosi, on September 12, 1950. He was one of eleven children born to Carmen Fernandez de Toranzo and Manuel Contreras. Toranozo Fernandez attended Instituto Carlos Gómez for elementary school. He enrolled at el Bachillerato en la Preparatoria de la Universidad Autónoma de San Luis Potosí before specializing in general surgery at the Facultad de Medicina.

Preceded by Jesús Marcelo de los Santos	Governor of San Luis Potosí; 2009-2015	Succeeded by Juan Manuel Carreras López
