= Carlos Torres Piña =

Mexican politician

Personal details
- Born: 1 March 1979 (age 47) Paracho de Verduzco, Michoacán, Mexico
- Party: National Regeneration Movement (2019–present)
- Other political affiliations: Party of the Democratic Revolution (1999–2019)
- Occupation: Politician
- Website: carlostorrespina.com

Carlos Torres Piña (Note: In this Mexican name, the surname is Torres and the second or maternal family name is Piña.) (born 1 March 1979) is a Mexican politician from the state of Michoacán. Formerly affiliated with the Party of the Democratic Revolution (PRD), he is a member of the National Regeneration Movement (MORENA).

He has served two terms in the Chamber of Deputies. In the 2009 mid-terms, he was elected to a plurinominal seat for the PRD. In the 2018 general election, he was again elected to a plurinominal seat for the PRD but resigned from its parliamentary group on 21 February 2019 and later aligned himself with MORENA.

Considered a close ally of Michoacán governor Alfredo Ramírez Bedolla, he served in his cabinet as secretary of government and, until June 2026, as attorney-general. On 14 September 2026, he was announced as MORENA's "state coordinator for the defence of the transformation and national sovereignty", in which capacity he is expected to represent the party in the Michoacán gubernatorial election of 6 June 2027.
