= Verónica Díaz Robles =

Mexican politician (born 1980)

Verónica del Carmen Díaz Robles (Note: In this Mexican name, the surname is Díaz and the second or maternal family name is Robles.) (born 23 September 1980) is a Mexican politician from the state of Zacatecas. She is a member of the National Regeneration Movement (Morena).

Verónica Díaz Robles was born in Fresnillo, Zacatecas, in 1980 and earned a B.A. in business administration from the Autonomous University of Fresnillo (UAF) in 2005. In 2018–2021 she was a member of the Congress of Zacatecas and, in the 2024 general election, she was elected to the state of Zacatecas's first seat in the Senate.

On 15 September 2026, she was announced as Morena's "state coordinator for the defence of the transformation and national sovereignty", in which capacity she is expected to represent the party in the Zacatecas gubernatorial election of 6 June 2027.

Díaz Robles is the former sister-in-law of David Monreal Ávila, the governor of Zacatecas for the 2021–2027 term.
