= Manuel Aguilera Gómez =

Mexican politician (1936–2022)

Member of the Congress of Mexico City
- In office 16 September 1997 – 15 September 2000

General Director of the Institute for Social Security and Services for State Workers
- In office 1 December 1994 – 10 April 1997
- Preceded by: Gonzalo Martínez Corbalá
- Succeeded by: José Antonio González Fernández

Head of the Federal District Department
- In office 29 November 1993 – 30 November 1994
- Preceded by: Manuel Camacho Solís
- Succeeded by: Óscar Espinosa Villarreal

Member of the Senate of the Republic of Mexico
- In office 1 November 1991 – 30 November 1993
- Preceded by: Ifigenia Martínez y Hernández
- Succeeded by: Luz Lajous Vargas

Personal details
- Born: Manuel Sergio del Corazón de Jesús Aguilera Gómez; 27 July 1936; Orizaba, Mexico
- Died: 8 October 2022 (aged 86); Mexico City, Mexico
- Political party: PRI
- Education: National Autonomous University of Mexico
- Occupation: Economist

Manuel Sergio del Corazón de Jesús Aguilera Gómez (27 July 1936 – 8 October 2022) was a Mexican politician. A member of the Institutional Revolutionary Party, he served in the Senate of the Republic from 1991 to 1993.

Aguilera died in Mexico City on 8 October 2022, at the age of 86.
