= Purificación Carpinteyro Calderón =

Mexican politician

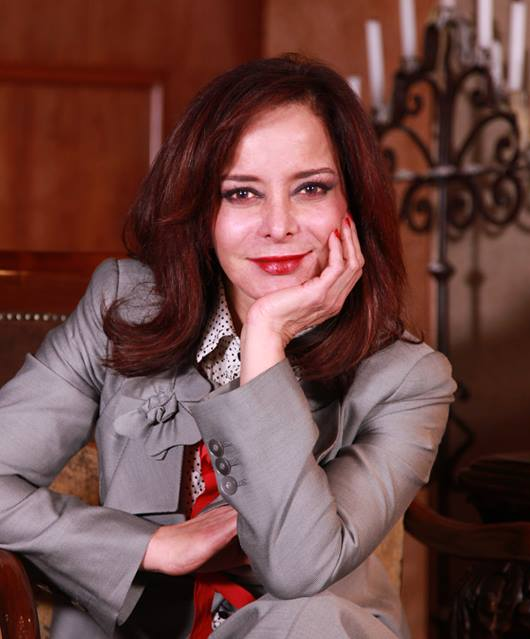
- Purificación Carpinteyro Calderón (2013)
- Born: 1 May 1961 (age 65); Miguel Hidalgo; Federal District, Mexico
- Education: LL.B., Escuela Libre Derecho; M.L., Harvard Law School
- Political party: Democratic Revolution

Proprietary deputy to the LXII Legislature of the Mexican Congress
- In office 29 August 2012 – 31 August 2015
- President: Felipe Calderón (2012); Enrique Peña Nieto (2012–15)
- Constituency: CDMX 22nd (Iztapalapa)

Purificación Carpinteyro Calderón is a Mexican politician.

Born on 1 May 1961 in the Federal District borough of Miguel Hidalgo, Purificación Carpinteyro Calderón received her Bachelor of Laws (Spanish: Licenciatura en Derecho) from the Escuela Libre de Derecho in 1984, and her Master of Laws from Harvard Law School in 1989. She was a member of the Party of the Democratic Revolution (PRD) when she served as the deputy from the Federal District's 22nd district (Iztapalapa) to the 62nd session of Congress from 29 August 2012 through 31 August 2015.
