= Rafael Curiel Gallegos =

Mexican politician

Colonel Rafael Curiel Gallegos
- Born: 30 December 1883; Ciudad Valles, Mexico
- Died: 1955 (aged 71–72) Mexico City, Mexico
- Allegiance: Constitutionalist Army (1910-15)
- Service years: 1910-15
- Rank: Colonel

Rafael Curiel Gallegos (30 December 1883, in Ciudad Valles, Mexico – 1955, in Mexico City, Mexico) was a Mexican army officer during the Mexican Revolution and civil servant.

== Early life ==
Curiel Gallegos attended the Escuela Nacional Preparatoria in Mexico City and the School of Engineering at the National Autonomous University of Mexico. As a young man, he fought against the dictatorship of Porfirio Díaz and was imprisoned on several occasions.

== Military and political career ==
He led the taking of Torreón and other military action in Coahuila, Durango, and Chihuahua (1910–15). He joined the forces of General Nicolás Flores, rising to the rank of colonel.

In 1919, he was a deputy in the Congress of San Luis Potosí, serving as Governor of san Luis Potosí between 1920-21. Curiel Gallegos retired in 1938 due to poor health and dedicated his time to agriculture in Zacatecas. He was instrumental in setting up the political constitution of the United Mexican States.

There is a school named after him in Ciudad Valles, called "Escuela Secundaria Rafael Curiel Gallegos".
