= Teófilo Torres Corzo =

Mexican politician (1946–2023)

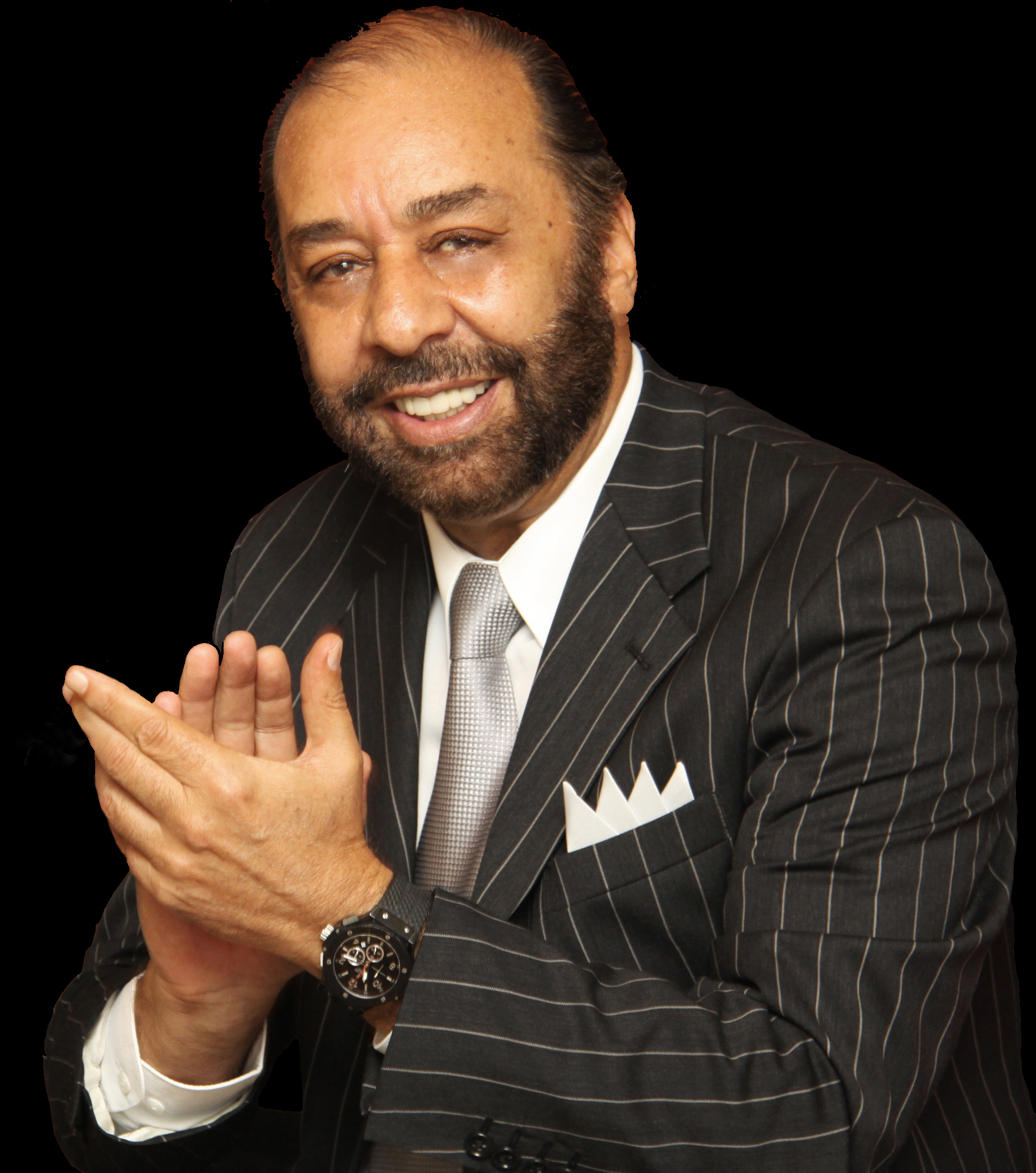
- Born: 9 August 1946; San Luis Potosí, San Luis Potosí, Mexico
- Died: 15 October 2023 (aged 77)
- Education: UASLP
- Occupation: Politician
- Political party: PRI

Teófeo Torres Corzo (9 August 1946 – 15 October 2023) was a Mexican lawyer, businessman and politician affiliated with the Institutional Revolutionary Party (PRI).

Torres Corzo was born in the city of San Luis Potosí in 1946.

In the 1985 mid-term election, he was elected to the Chamber of Deputies for San Luis Potosí's 1st district, and in 1991, he served as the interim governor of San Luis Potosí following the resignation of Fausto Zapata.

In the 2012 general election, he was elected to the Senate for San Luis Potosí, where he served during the 62nd and 63rd sessions of Congress.

Teófilo Torres Corzo died on 15 October 2023, at the age of 77.
