= Salvador Nava Martínez =

Mexican politician

Salvador Nava Martínez (April 7, 1914 – May 18, 1992) was a Mexican physician, politician and activist. An ophthalmologist and professor at the Universidad Autónoma de San Luis Potosí in the School of Medicine, he eventually became a leader in the opposition movement in San Luis Potosí and the greater Mexican political arena.

== Origin and political exile: 1958-1963 ==
Salvador Nava's political career began in 1958 when he decided to run for mayor of San Luis Potosí under the national Institutional Revolutionary Party (PRI) banner. Nava won the election and set his goals on the governor's office in the upcoming election. In 1961 Nava attempted to run for the office of governor as the PRI candidate but was rejected by the party. The Potosino Civic Front was created by Nava in response to the rejection and he went on to run as an independent in the election. The PRI candidate won the election, but reports of voter fraud emerged.

Nava led protests against the results and the ruling PRI party; demonstrations and violence broke out. The army was called in by President Adolfo López Mateos to quell the disturbance. The army's occupation lasted three months in which the Navista Committee headquarters was raided and the opposition paper Tribunal ransacked and its presses destroyed. Nava was arrested and many protesters were shot during out breaks. Nava and what was labeled his "collaborators" were taken to Campo Militar Numero 1 and later transferred to Lecumberri Prison on charges of social dissolution, stockpiling of weapons and incitations of rebellion. A month after the arrest, Nava and his followers were released on bail; however Navas political protests continued. The government arrested Nava again two years later in 1963, torturing him and later releasing him. Nava stepped away from the political scene for over 15 years when in 1982 he reappeared.

== Return to politics: 1982-1992 ==
Nava once again ran for Mayor with the back drop of his Potosíno Civic Front (FCP), supported by the National Action Party (PAN) and the Unified Socialist Party of Mexico (PSUM). Nava won the 1982 Mayoral election and again set his sights on the governors office. In 1991 Nava, now in his late 70's and suffering from bladder cancer, ran for the governor's office under the PCF and supported by the Mexican Democratic Party (PDM), PAN, and the Party of the Democratic Revolution (PRD). Nava's opponent in the 1991 election was Fausto Zapata who represented the ruling PRI party. Zapata had held previous posts such as congressman and senator as well as foreign ambassador. With the ballots closed Zapata was declared the victor by 2–1 margin, and Nava again claimed fraud by the PRI. Nava's claims this time were supported by groups set up to examine the voting process. Poll watchers reported violations of voting rights at over half the locations, stating there were instances of polling places transferring locations at the last minute, names being removed from the registration lists, PRI members voting multiple times and missing ballot boxes.

In response to the fraud, the 77-year-old Nava initiated what he called the March for Dignity, a 265-mile march from the city of San Luis Potosí to Zócalo in Mexico City, estimated to take 1 month to complete. En route to Mexico City, Nava demanded the president remove Zapata from office due to the growing scandal and protests. Women supporters of Nava occupied the governors palace refusing to let Zapata take office. In the wake of the growing election fraud throughout Mexico, Nava's group hoped to align with the PAN-supported candidate to the north. While the March was en route, Nava and the PAN were offered the positions of interim Governor to quell the uprising. Nava refused the deal but PAN accepted, splintering the once aligned groups.

Thirteen days after Zapata's election certification, he resigned the office at the behest of President Carlos Salinas de Gortari. With the March of Dignity returning home believing they had succeeded, Salinas appointed Gonzalo Martinez Corbala, a PRI member, to the Governors office, instead of Nava. Zapata was then awarded the position of consul general for Mexico in Los Angeles. Martinez arranged for new elections in 1993 with citizen councils running the elections and polling locations.

== Citizens Movement for Democracy (MCD): 1992 ==
Nava's last act was the foundation of the Citizens Movement for Democracy (MCD) in 1992. On March 1, 1992, the MCD held its first convention, drawing over 60 indigenous, community labor, citizen, and human rights organizations. The MCD called for the defense of human and political rights as defined by the United Nations Universal Declaration of Human Rights and the Mexican Constitution.

The MCD further called for the following governmental changes:

- End the state monopoly of administration of elections
- Dismantle the concentrated power of the presidency and create checks and balances
- Reform the judicial system and create an independent supreme court
- Give the state congresses and the federal congress the power of centralism in the Mexican political system
- Give autonomy to municipal governments
- End communications monopolies in television and radio
- Insure freedom of the press
- Democratize labor unions, trade associations, political parties and education institutions

== Death and family: 1992 ==
On March 8, 1992, Nava retired from politics after being given less than 2 years to live. On March 18, 1992, Nava died from a heart attack provoked by abdominal infection. Shortly after, Nava's widow, Maria Concepcion Calvillo, ran for office under Nava's political banner. She was opposed by her son-in-law and daughter. Nava's widow polled poorly in the election.

== See also ==
- List of presidents of San Luis Potosí Municipality
