= List of municipal presidents of Sabinas Hidalgo =

The following is a list of the municipal presidents of Sabinas Hidalgo, Nuevo León.

Name	From	Until
Juan Manuel de la Garza	1829	
Ignacio de Llano	1830	
José María Espinosa	1831	
José Francisco Santos	1832	
José Leonardo Flores	1833	
Ignacio de Llano	1834	
Santiago de la Peña	1835	
Francisco Santos	1836	
Santiago de la Peña	1837	
Leonardo Flores	1838	
Juan Angel de la Ibarra	1839	
José María Ancira	1840	
Félix Salinas	1841	
Manuel Salinas	1842	
José María Ancira	1843	
Antonio Larralde	1844	
Francisco Santos	1845	
Antonio Larralde	1846	
Pablo Ancira	1847	
Julián Salinas	1848	
Félix Salinas	1849	
Manuel Salinas	1850	
Dionisio Chapa	1851	
Victoriano Ancira	1852	
Pablo Ancira	1853	
Manuel Salinas Villarreal	1854	
Victoriano Ancira	1855	
Manuel Salinas	1856	
Julián Salinas	1857	
José María Ancira	1858	1859
Antonio Larralde	1860	
Clemente González	1861	1862
Cristóbal Enríquez	1862	1863
Cosme Santos	1864	
Cecilio Garza	1865	
Cristóbal Enríquez	1866	
Cecilio de la Garza	1867	
Ramón Garza	1868	
Cecilio de la Garza	1869	1870
Ambrosio Ancira	1871	
Higinio Mireles	1872	
Ambrosio Ancira	1873	
José María Guzmán	1874	
Guadalupe Morales	1875	
Ambrosio Ancira	1876	
Higinio Mireles	1877	1878
José María Guzmán	1879	1880
Cecilio Garza Montemayor	1881	
Andrés de los Santos	1882	
José María de los Santos	1883	1884
Cristóbal Enríquez	1885	
José María Guzmán	1886	
Ambrosio Ancira	1887	1889
Nicolás Larralde	1890	
Guadalupe Morales	1891	
Cristóbal Enríquez	1892	1901
José Garay	1902	1903
Cristóbal Enríquez	1904	
Pablo de los Santos	1905	1909
Ramón Garza Gutiérrez	1910	
Melchor Ancira	1911	
Adolfo Garza Jiménez	1912	
Pablo Salazar	1913	
José María Cepeda	1914	1915
Alberto Chapa	1915	1916
Simón Leyva	1916	1916
Salvador Santos	1916	
Margarito Martínez Leal	1917	
F. de Jesús Treviño	1918	
Adolfo Garza Jiménez	1919	1920
Antonio Solís	1921	1922
José Morales Garza	1923	1923
Federico Garza Flores	1923	1924
Abraham Lozano	1924	1924
Anastacio Castillo	1924	
Tomás Chapa Martínez	1925	1926
Gaspar Ibarra	1927	1928
Adolfo Garza Jiménez	1929	1930
Enrique Lozano	1931	1933
Martín González	1934	
José María Ancira G.	1935	1936
Gorgonio Ruiz Ayala	1937	
Juan José Montemayor	1938	
Adolfo Garza Jiménez	1939	1940
Roque Garza Cantú	1941	1942
Encarnación G. González	1943	1945
Carlos Solís Acosta	1946	1948
Fernando Viejo Quiroga	1949	1951
Gilberto Garza González	1952	1954
Antonio Garza	1955	1957
Humberto González Pérez	1958	1960
Antonio González	1961	1963
Ramón Mireles	1964	1966
Daniel Guadiana Ibarra	1967	1969
Antonio Garza Ayala	1970	1971
Arturo Solís Montemayor	1972	1973
Julio Sánchez Garza	1974	1976
Homero Ibarra Montemayor	1977	1979
Leopoldo González González	1980	1982
Eloy Treviño Rodríguez	1983	1985
Rodolfo Garza Ruiz	1986	April 1986
Gustavo Ancira González	April 1986	1988
José Viejo Mireles	1989	1991
Rodolfo Garza Ancira	1992	1994
Eloy Treviño Rodríguez	1994	1997
Gilberto Hernández Garza	1997	2000
Fernando González Viejo	2000	2003
Leopoldo González González	2003	March 2006
Otoniel Arrambide Villarreal (substitute)	March 2006	October 2006
Daniel Omar González Garza	2006	2009
Raúl Mario Mireles Garza	2009	

== See also ==
- Governor of Nuevo León
