= Ricardo Gallardo =

Mexican politician (born 1980)

Governor of San Luis Potosí
- Incumbent
- Assumed office 26 September 2021
- Preceded by: Juan Manuel Carreras

Personal details
- Born: José Ricardo Gallardo Cardona; 18 November 1980 (age 45) San Luis Potosí, San Luis Potosí
- Party: Ecologist Green Party of Mexico (2019–present)
- Other political affiliations: Party of the Democratic Revolution (1998–2019)
- Spouse: Ruth González Silva
- Occupation: Lawyer

José Ricardo Gallardo Cardona (born 18 November 1980) is a Mexican politician currently affiliated with the Ecologist Green Party of Mexico (PVEM) who previously belonged to the Party of the Democratic Revolution (PRD). Since 2021 he is serving as the governor of San Luis Potosí.

As a member of the PRD, he served as the mayor of Soledad de Graciano Sánchez from 2012 to 2015 and, from 2018 to 2021, as the deputy for San Luis Potosí's 2nd district. After February 2019 he sat in the Chamber as an independent and, in September 2019, he aligned himself with the PVEM.
