= Fausto Zapata =

Mexican politician

Governor of San Luis Potosí
- In office 26 September 1991 – 9 October 1991
- Preceded by: Leopoldino Ortiz Santos
- Succeeded by: Gonzalo Martínez Corbalá

Personal details
- Born: 18 December 1940 San Luis Potosí, San Luis Potosí, Mexico
- Died: 15 December 2014 (aged 73) Mexico City, Mexico
- Party: PRI
- Children: 1, Dushka Zapata
- Profession: Lawyer, politician, diplomat, journalist and television presenter

Fausto Zapata Loredo (18 December 1940 – 15 December 2014) was a Mexican lawyer, politician, diplomat, journalist and television presenter. A member of the Institutional Revolutionary Party (PRI), he briefly served as governor of San Luis Potosí in 1991 before being forced to resign amid post-election fraud accusations. He had previously served in both chambers of Congress and also held a variety of diplomatic positions.

== Career ==
Fausto Zapata was born on 18 December 1940 in the city of San Luis Potosí. He studied at the law school of the Autonomous University of San Luis Potosí (UASLP). By the age of 20 he was working as a journalist, including a stint at La Prensa under Manuel Buendía.

In 1967–1970 he sat in the Chamber of Deputies for San Luis Potosí's 4th district as the alternate of Guillermo Fonseca Álvarez. He later worked under President Luis Echeverría (1970–1976) as undersecretary of the office of the president, with responsibility for the government's relations with the media. In that position, he was instrumental in the 1976 expulsion of Julio Scherer García from the Mexico City daily Excélsior.

In the 1976 general election he was elected to the Senate for San Luis Potosí.

Zapata served briefly as Governor of San Luis Potosí from 26 September to 9 October 1991 before being forced to resign, under pressure from President Carlos Salinas, amid post-election fraud accusations led by Salvador Nava, his opponent in the 1991 state election.

He also held a range of diplomatic posts, including as ambassador to Italy (1977), Malta (1977), China (1987), North Korea (1987) and as consul in Los Angeles (1992) and New York (1993).

In 1988 he was appointed borough chief in Coyoacán, Mexico City, and in 2009, following political reforms allowing the direct election of borough mayors, he unsuccessfully ran for the same position.

Since 2005 he anchored Diálogos Políticos, a political analysis and commentary program on Televisión Mexiquense.

Fausto Zapata Loredo died of cancer in Mexico City on 15 December 2014, at the age of 73.

== Honours ==
- Great Britain, Knight Commander of The Royal Victorian Order
- France, Grand Officier de l’Ordre National Du Mérite
- Italy, Gran Croce
- Germany, Order of Merit Mérito: Great Cross
- Japan, Order of the Rising Sun
- Austria, Order of Merit: Grand Official
- Brazil, Order Nacional del Cruzeiro Du Sul: Gran Cruz
- Venezuela, Order Francisco de Miranda: Primera Clase and Orden del Libertador: Gran Oficial
- Jordan, Order al-Istiglal
- Egypt, Order of Merit, Gran Oficial
