= Francisco Diego Aguilar =

Mexican politician

- Born: 12 June 1972 (age 53); Mexico City, Mexico
- Occupation: Politician
- Political party: PRD

Francisco Diego Aguilar (born 12 June 1972) is a Mexican politician affiliated with the Party of the Democratic Revolution. As of 2014 he served as Deputy of the LIX Legislature of the Mexican Congress representing the Federal District as replacement of Gilberto Ensástiga.
