= Jorge Lozano Armengol =

Mexican politician

- Born: 11 March 1948 (age 78); San Luis Potosí, San Luis Potosí, Mexico
- Education: Universidad Autónoma de Guadalajara
- Occupation: Politician
- Political party: PAN

Jorge Lozano Armengol (born 11 March 1948) is a Mexican politician affiliated with the National Action Party. He served as Senator of the LVIII and LIX Legislatures of the Mexican Congress representing San Luis Potosí, as well as a local deputy in the LI Legislature of the Congress of San Luis Potosí.
