= Municipal president =

Chief of government of municipios in Mexico

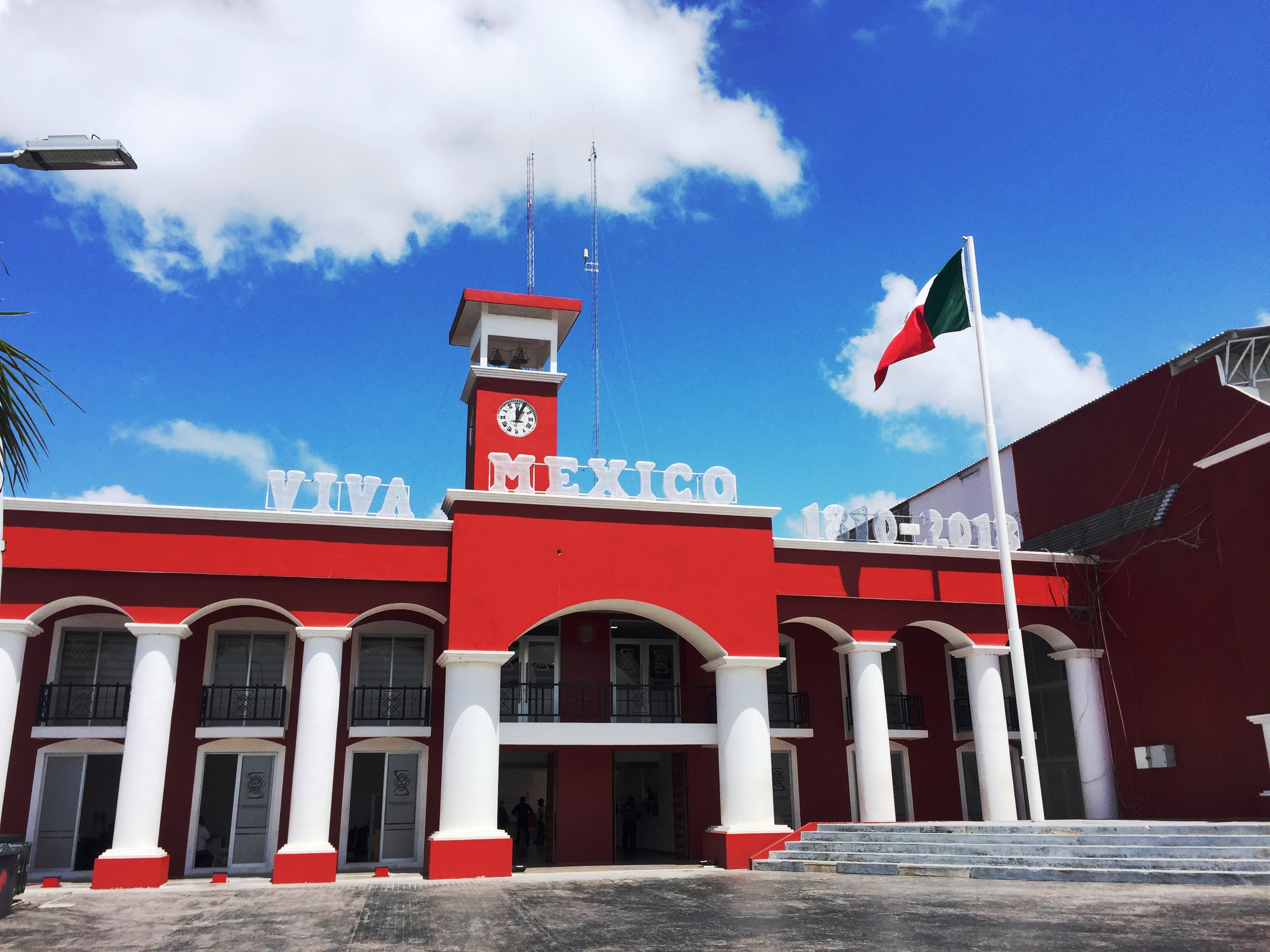
Municipal presidents' government headquarters are known as municipal palaces (palacios municipales)

A municipal president (Spanish: presidente municipal) is the chief of government of municipalities in Mexico. This title was also used in the Philippines during the Spanish and American colonial periods; it is comparable to a mayor of the town or city. The position is comparable to the county executive of a county in the United States or to the mayor of a city in the United States, although the jurisdiction of a presidente municipal includes not only a city but the municipality surrounding it. Nationally, this position is also equivalent to that of Head of Government of the Federal District and that is why these positions are sometimes referred to as "mayors" in English-language publications.

== Lists ==
- Municipal president of Acapulco, Guerrero
- Municipal president of Chihuahua, Chihuahua
- Municipal president of Ensenada, Baja California
- Municipal president of Juárez, Chihuahua
- Municipal president of Mérida, Yucatán
- Municipal president of Monterrey, Nuevo León
- Municipal president of Pabellón de Arteaga, Aguascalientes
- Municipal president of Puebla, Puebla
- Municipal president of Sabinas Hidalgo, Nuevo León
- Municipal president of San Luis Potosí, San Luis Potosí
- Municipal president of Tijuana, Baja California

== See also ==
- Alcalde
- Municipalities of Mexico, the jurisdiction of a presidente municipal
