= Governor of San Luis Potosí =

- Incumbent; Ricardo Gallardo Cardona since September 26, 2021
- Term length: Six years, non-renewable.

The governor of San Luis Potosí exercises the role of the executive branch of government in the Mexican state of San Luis Potosí, per the Political Constitution of the Free and Sovereign State of San Luis Potosí. The official title is Gobernador Constitucional del Estado Libre y Soberano de San Luis Potosí (Governor of the Free and Sovereign State of San Luis Potosí).

The governor is democratically elected for a term of six years, and cannot be re-elected. The term begins of September 26 in the year of the election and terminates on September 25, six years later.

The state of San Luis Potosí was established in 1824 as one of the original states of the Mexican federation, and has thus survived all the varying historic systems of the Mexican government. At a certain point in history, San Luis Potosí was a "Department", and as such, the title of the executive varied as well.

== List of governors ==
Gobernadores Constitucionales (Constitutional Governors)

- Carlos Díez Gutiérrez 1877-1898
- Blas Escontría Bustamante 1898-1902
- Blas Escontría Bustamante 1902-1905
- José María Espinosa y Cuevas 1908-1910
- José María Espinosa y Cuevas 1910-1911
- Rafael Cepeda 1911-1913
- Juan G. Barragán Rodríguez 1917-1919
- Severino Martínez Gómez 1919-1920
- Rafael Nieto Compéan 1920-1923
- Aurelio Manrique De Lara 1923-1925
- Abel Cano Villa 1925-1927
- Saturnino Cedillo Martínez 1927-1931
- Ildefonso Turrubiartes 1931-1935
- Mateo Fernández Netro 1935-1938
- Reynaldo Pérez Gallardo 1939-1941
- Gonzalo Natividad Santos Rivera 1943-1949
- Ismael Salas Penieres 1949-1955
- Manuel Álvarez 1955-1959
- Manuel López Dávila 1961-1967
- Antonio Rocha Cordero 1967-1973
- Guillermo Fonseca Álvarez 1973-1979
- Carlos Jonguitud Barrios 1979-1985
- Florencio Salazar Martínez 1985-1987
- Fausto Zapata Loredo 1991
- no data
- Horacio Sánchez Unzueta 1993-1997
- Fernando Silva Nieto 1997-2003
- Jesús Marcelo de los Santos Fraga 2003-2009 PAN
- Fernando Toranzo Fernández 2009-2015 PRI
- Juan Manuel Carreras 2015-2021 PRI
- Ricardo Gallardo Cardona 2021–present PVEM

Gobernadores Interinos (Interim Governors)

- Juan Flores Ayala 1897-1897
- José María Aguirre y Fierro 1906-1906
- Arnulfo Pedroza 1911-1911
- José Encarnación Ipiña 1911-1911
- Antonio F. Alonso 1912-1912
- Cayetano García 1912-1912
- Francisco Romero 1912-1912
- Eulalio Gutiérrez Ortiz 1913-1914
- José Refugio Velasco 1914-1914
- Pablo González Garza 1914-1914
- Ricardo Muñoz 1914-1914
- Herminio Álvarez 1914-1915
- Adolfo Flores 1915-1915
- Emiliano G. Sarabia y M. 1915-1915
- Gabriel Garavia Castro 1915-1915
- José Carlos Kaperowitz 1915-1915
- Vicente Dávila Aguirre 1915-1916
- Federico Chapoy 1916-1917
- Nicasio Sánchez Salazar 1916-1918
- Antonio Vives 1917-1917
- Rafael Castillo Vega 1917-1917
- Severino Martínez Gómez 1918-1919
- Manuel I. Vildósola 1919-1919
- Mariano Flores 1919-1919
- Rafael Segura 1919-1919
- José Santos Alonso 1920-1920
- Pedro Moctezuma 1920-1920
- Rafael Curiel 1920-1920
- Pedro Martínez Noriega 1920-1921
- Ángel Silva 1921-1921
- Gabriel Martínez 1921-1921
- Gonzalo Natividad Santos Rivera 1921-1921
- José Fraga 1921-1921
- José Santos Alonso 1921-1921
- Gabriel Macías 1921-1922
- Alfredo E. Garza 1922-1922
- Ángel Silva 1922-1922
- Manuel Rodríguez 1922-1922
- Pío Mendoza 1922-1922
- Santiago Rincón Gallardo 1922-1922
- Gabriel Macías 1923-1923
- Jorge Prieto Laurents 1923-1923
- Lorenzo Nieto Pro 1923-1923
- Graciano Sánchez Romo 1924-1924
- Hilario Hermosillo 1924-1924
- Octaviano Rangel 1924-1924
- Ricardo Aldape 1924-1925
- Hilario Hermosillo 1925-1925
- Rafael Chávez 1925-1925
- Rutiló Alamilla 1926-1926
- Marcelino Zúñiga 1927-1927
- Timoteo B. Guerrero 1927-1927
- Eugenio Jiménez 1928-1928
- Timoteo B. Guerrero 1928-1928
- Eugenio Jiménez 1929-1929
- Vicente Segura 1929-1929
- Eugenio Jiménez 1930-1930
- Baldomero Zapata 1931-1931
- Ignacio Cuellar 1931-1931
- Luis M. Lárraga 1931-1931
- Aureliano G. Anaya 1934-1934
- Benigno Sandoval 1934-1934
- Rubén Solís 1935-1935
- Arturo Leija 1937-1937
- José Pilar García 1938-1938
- Miguel Álvarez Acosta 1938-1938
- Benito C. Flores 1940-1940
- Celedonio E. Terrazas 1940-1940
- David González 1940-1940
- Luis Aguilera 1940-1940
- Rafael Santos Lazcano 1940-1940
- Felipe Cardiel Reyes 1941-1941
- Hilario Hermosillo 1941-1941
- José Ma. Escobedo 1941-1941
- Agustín Olivo Monsiváis 1958-1959
- Teófilo Torres Corzo 1992-1993

Gobernadores Substitutos (Substitute Governors)

- Juan Flores Ayala 1897-1897
- Blas Escontría Bustamante 1898-1898
- Joaquín Arguinzoniz 1900-1900
- José María Espinosa y Cuevas 1906-1906
- Francisco A. Noyola 1909-1909
- Rafael Cepeda 1911-1911
- Agustín García Hernández 1913-1913
- Arturo A. Amaya 1914-1914
- Camilo Lozano 1914-1914
- Mariano Palau 1914-1914
- Francisco Martínez De La Vega 1899-1901
- Leopoldino Ortiz Santos 1887-1891

== See also ==
- San Luis Potosí
