= Medellin (disambiguation) =

Medellín is a city and municipality in the Antioquia Department, Colombia.

Medellín may also refer to:

== Places ==
- Medellin, Cebu, Philippines
- Medellín, Veracruz, Mexico
  - Medellín Municipality, Veracruz
- Medellín, Spain
- Medellín River, in Colombia

== People ==
- Antonio Medellín (1942–2017), Mexican actor
- Antonio Medellín Varela (born 1957), Mexican politician
- Enriqueta Medellín (1948–2022), Mexican environmentalist
- José Medellín (1975–2008), Mexican citizen executed in Texas
- Rodrigo Medellín (born 1957), Mexican ecologist

== Other uses ==
- Medellin (film), a 2023 action-comedy
- "Medellín" (song), by Madonna and Maluma, 2019
- Medellin, a fictional film about Pablo Escobar in the TV series Entourage

== See also ==
- Battle of Medellín, during the Peninsular war
- Independiente Medellín, a Colombian football team
- Medellín v. Texas, a United States Supreme Court case dealing with José Medellín
- Medellín Cartel, a Colombian drug trafficking cartel run by Pablo Escobar
