= 1st federal electoral district of San Luis Potosí =

Federal electoral district of Mexico

San Luis Potosí's 1st
- Electoral district of the Chamber of Deputies of Mexico

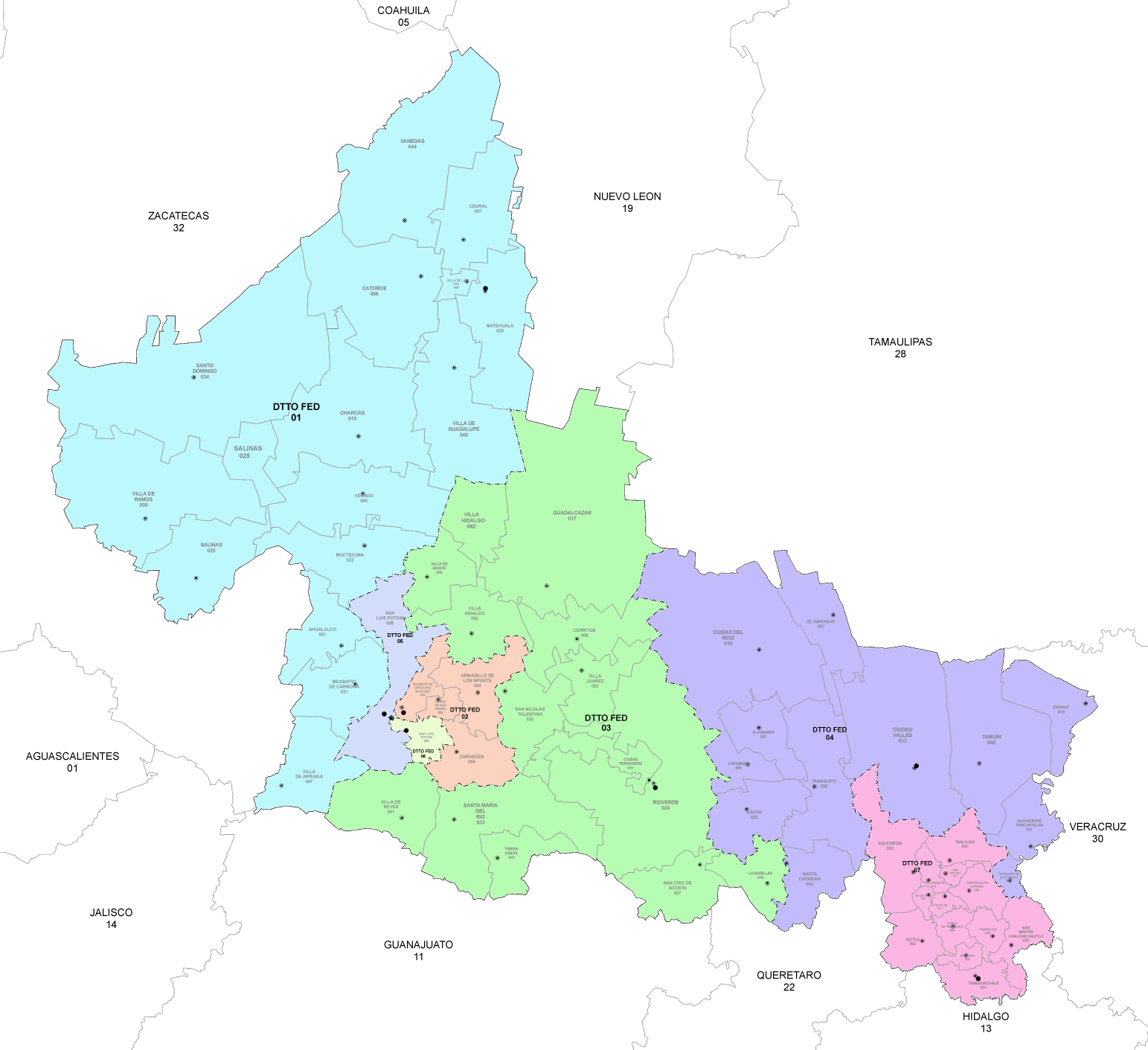
- 1st district since 2023

Incumbent
- Member: Aremy Velazco Bautista
- Party: ▌Morena
- Congress: 66th (2024–2027)

District
- State: San Luis Potosí
- Head town: Matehuala
- Coordinates: 23°39′N 100°38′W
- Covers: 15 municipalities: Ahualulco, Catorce, Cedral, Charcas, Matehuala, Mexquitic de Carmona, Moctezuma, Salinas, Santo Domingo, Vanegas, Venado, Villa de Arriaga, Villa de Guadalupe, Villa de La Paz, Villa de Ramos
- PR region: Second
- Precincts: 340
- Population: 381,815 (2020 census)

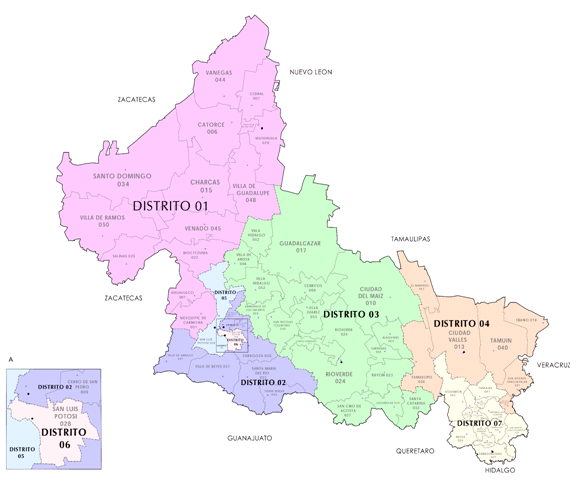
San Luis Potosí under the 2017–2022 scheme

The 1st federal electoral district of San Luis Potosí (Spanish: Distrito electoral federal 01 de San Luis Potosí) is one of the 300 electoral districts into which Mexico is divided for elections to the federal Chamber of Deputies and one of seven such districts in the state of San Luis Potosí.

It elects one deputy to the lower house of Congress for each three-year legislative session by means of the first-past-the-post system. Votes cast in the district also count towards the calculation of proportional representation ("plurinominal") deputies elected from the second region.

The current member for the district, elected in the 2024 general election, is Aremy Velazco Bautista of the National Regeneration Movement (Morena).

== District territory ==
Under the 2023 districting plan adopted by the National Electoral Institute (INE), which is to be used for the 2024, 2027 and 2030 federal elections, the first district is situated in the north and west of the state, along the border with Nuevo León, Zacatecas and Guanajuato. It covers 340 electoral precincts (secciones electorales) across 15 of the state's municipalities:

- Ahualulco, Catorce, Cedral, Charcas, Matehuala, Mexquitic de Carmona, Moctezuma, Salinas, Santo Domingo, Vanegas, Venado, Villa de Arriaga, Villa de Guadalupe, Villa de La Paz and Villa de Ramos.

The district's head town (cabecera distrital), where results from individual polling stations are gathered together and tallied, is the city of Matehuala. The district reported a population of 381,815 in the 2020 census.

== Previous districting schemes ==
Evolution of electoral district numbers
	1974	1978	1996	2005	2017	2023
San Luis Potosí	5	7	7	7	7	7
Chamber of Deputies	196	300				

2017–2022

Between 2017 and 2022, the district comprised 14 municipalities in the state's north and north-west: the same group as in the 2023 plan except for Villa de Arriaga. Matehuala served as the head town.

2005–2017

Under the 2005 plan, the district comprised the same 14 municipalities as in the 2017 scheme. Matehuala served as the head town.

1996–2005

From 1996 to 2005, the district covered 14 municipalities: Catorce, Cedral, Charcas, Guadalcázar, Matehuala, Moctezuma, Salinas, Santo Domingo, Vanegas, Venado, Villa de Arista, Villa de Guadalupe, Villa de la Paz and Villa de Ramos. Matehuala served as the head town.

1978–1996

The districting scheme in force from 1978 to 1996 was the result of the 1977 electoral reforms, which increased the number of single-member seats in the Chamber of Deputies from 196 to 300. Under that plan, San Luis Potosí's seat allocation rose from five to seven. The first district covered a part of the state capital, the city of San Luis Potosí.

== Deputies returned to Congress ==
(Mexico) National parties
- Current
- PAN
- PRI
- PT
- PVEM
- MC
- Morena
- PAZ
- Somos
- Defunct or local only
- PLM
- PNR
- PRM
- PNM
- PP
- PPS
- PARM
- PFCRN
- CON
- PANAL
- PSD
- PES
- PES
- PRD

San Luis Potosí's 1st district
Election	Deputy	Party	Term	Legislature
1916	Samuel de los Santos		1916–1917	Constituent Congress of Querétaro
...
1979	Antonio Rocha Cordero	Institutional Revolutionary Party	1979–1982	51st Congress
1982	Víctor Alfonso Maldonado Moreleón	Institutional Revolutionary Party	1982–1985	52nd Congress
1985	Teófilo Torres Corzo	Institutional Revolutionary Party	1985–1988	53rd Congress
1988	Mario Leal Campos	National Action Party (Mexico)	1988–1991	54th Congress
1991	Alfredo Lujambio Rafols	National Action Party (Mexico)	1991–1994	55th Congress
1994	Jesús Eduardo Noyola Bernal; María de Lourdes Carrillo Medina	Institutional Revolutionary Party	1994–1997; 1997	56th Congress
1997	Juana González Ortiz	Institutional Revolutionary Party	1997–2000	57th Congress
2000	Juan Manuel Carreras López	Institutional Revolutionary Party	2000–2003	58th Congress
2003	Alfonso Juventino Nava Díaz	Institutional Revolutionary Party	2003–2006	59th Congress
2006	Antonio Medellín Varela	National Action Party (Mexico)	2006–2009	60th Congress
2009	Sonia Mendoza Díaz	National Action Party (Mexico)	2009–2012	61st Congress
2012	José Everardo Nava Gómez	Institutional Revolutionary Party	2012–2015	62nd Congress
2015	Ruth Noemí Tiscareño Agoitia	Institutional Revolutionary Party	2015–2018	63rd Congress
2018	María Sara Rocha Medina	Institutional Revolutionary Party	2018–2021	64th Congress
2021	Roberto Alejandro Segovia Hernández	Ecologist Green Party of Mexico	2021–2024	65th Congress
2024	Aremy Velazco Bautista	National Regeneration Movement	2024–2027	66th Congress

== Presidential elections ==
San Luis Potosí's 1st district
Election	District won by	Party or coalition	%
2018	Andrés Manuel López Obrador	Juntos Haremos Historia	35.7815
2024	Claudia Sheinbaum Pardo	Sigamos Haciendo Historia	64.0772
