= 2nd federal electoral district of San Luis Potosí =

Federal electoral district of Mexico

San Luis Potosí's 2nd
- Electoral district of the Chamber of Deputies of Mexico

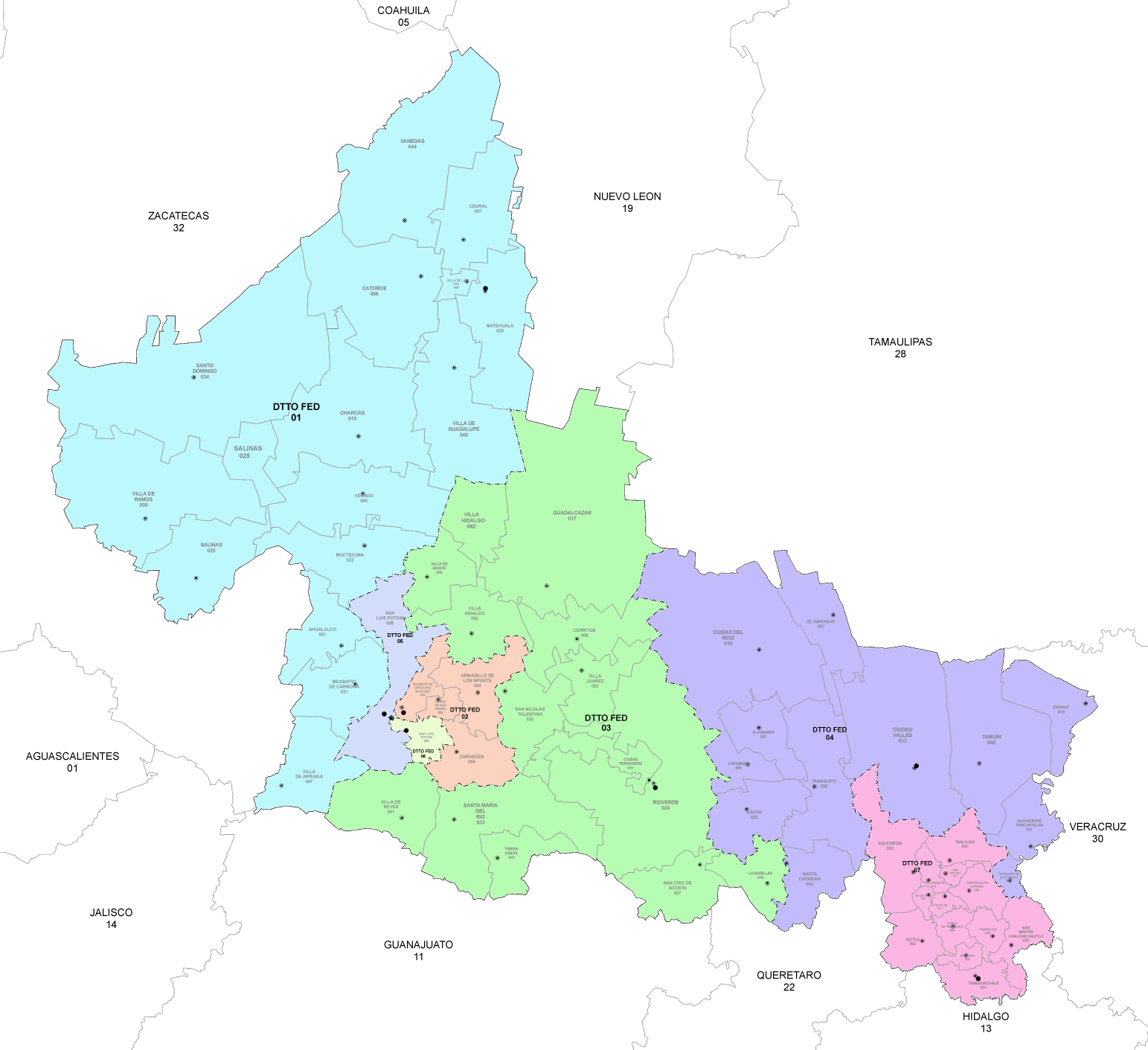
- 2nd district since 2023

Incumbent
- Member: José Luis Fernández Martínez
- Party: ▌Ecologist Green Party of Mexico
- Congress: 66th (2024–2027)

District
- State: San Luis Potosí
- Head town: Soledad de Graciano Sánchez
- Coordinates: 22°11′N 100°56′W
- Covers: Armadillo de los Infante, Cerro de San Pedro, Soledad de Graciano Sánchez, Zaragoza
- PR region: Second
- Precincts: 140
- Population: 372,779 (2020 census)

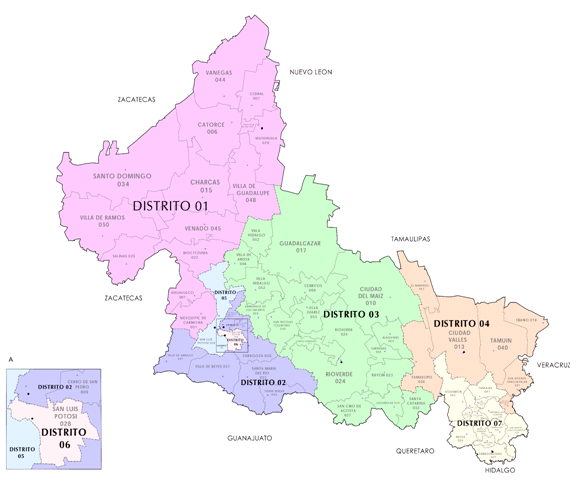
San Luis Potosí under the 2017–2022 scheme

The 2nd federal electoral district of San Luis Potosí (Spanish: Distrito electoral federal 02 de San Luis Potosí) is one of the 300 electoral districts into which Mexico is divided for elections to the federal Chamber of Deputies and one of seven such districts in the state of San Luis Potosí.

It elects one deputy to the lower house of Congress for each three-year legislative session by means of the first-past-the-post system. Votes cast in the district also count towards the calculation of proportional representation ("plurinominal") deputies elected from the second region.

The current member for the district, elected in the 2024 general election, is José Luis Fernández Martínez of the Ecologist Green Party of Mexico (PVEM).

== District territory ==
Under the 2023 districting plan adopted by the National Electoral Institute (INE), which is to be used for the 2024, 2027 and 2030 federal elections, the second district is situated to the north and east of the state capital, the city of San Luis Potosí. It covers 140 electoral precincts (secciones electorales) across four of the state's municipalities:

- Armadillo de los Infante, Cerro de San Pedro, Soledad de Graciano Sánchez and Zaragoza.

The district's head town (cabecera distrital), where results from individual polling stations are gathered together and tallied, is the state's second largest city, Soledad de Graciano Sánchez. The district reported a population of 372,779 in the 2020 census.

== Previous districting schemes ==
Evolution of electoral district numbers
	1974	1978	1996	2005	2017	2023
San Luis Potosí	5	7	7	7	7	7
Chamber of Deputies	196	300				

2017–2022

Between 2017 and 2022, the district comprised seven municipalities located to the north, east and south of the state capital: Cerro de San Pedro, Santa María del Río, Soledad de Graciano Sánchez, Tierra Nueva, Villa de Arriaga, Villa de Reyes and Zaragoza. The head town was at Soledad de Graciano Sánchez.

2005–2017

Under the 2005 plan, the district covered eight municipalities: the 2017 scheme's seven, plus Armadillo de los Infante.

1996–2005

From 1996 to 2005, the district covered 11 municipalities: the same group as in the 2005 scheme, plus Ahualulco, Mexquitic de Carmona and Villa Hidalgo.

1978–1996

The districting scheme in force from 1978 to 1996 was the result of the 1977 electoral reforms, which increased the number of single-member seats in the Chamber of Deputies from 196 to 300. Under that plan, San Luis Potosí's seat allocation rose from five to seven. The second district covered the municipalities of Catorce, Cedral, Charcas, Matehuala (the head town), Salinas, Santo Domingo, Vanegas, Venado, Villa de Arriaga, Villa de Guadalupe, Villa de La Paz, Villa de Ramos and Villa Hidalgo.

== Deputies returned to Congress ==
(Mexico) National parties
- Current
- PAN
- PRI
- PT
- PVEM
- MC
- Morena
- PAZ
- Somos
- Defunct or local only
- PLM
- PNR
- PRM
- PNM
- PP
- PPS
- PARM
- PFCRN
- CON
- PANAL
- PSD
- PES
- PES
- PRD

San Luis Potosí's 2nd district
Election	Deputy	Party	Term	Legislature
1916	Arturo Méndez		1916–1917	Constituent Congress of Querétaro
...
1979	Antonio Sandoval González	Institutional Revolutionary Party	1979–1982	51st Congress
1982	José Guadalupe Vega Macías	Institutional Revolutionary Party	1982–1985	52nd Congress
1985	José Marcelino Rodríguez Silva	Institutional Revolutionary Party	1985–1988	53rd Congress
1988	José Guadalupe Vega Macías	Institutional Revolutionary Party	1988–1991	54th Congress
1991	Felipe Rodríguez Grimaldo	Institutional Revolutionary Party	1991–1994	55th Congress
1994	María Elena Yrizar Arias	National Action Party (Mexico)	1994–1997	56th Congress
1997	Álvaro Elías Loredo	National Action Party (Mexico)	1997–2000	57th Congress
2000	Adrián Salvador Galarza González	National Action Party (Mexico)	2000–2003	58th Congress
2003	Álvaro Elías Loredo	National Action Party (Mexico)	2003–2006	59th Congress
2006	Agustín Leura González	National Action Party (Mexico)	2006–2009	60th Congress
2009	Wendy Guadalupe Rodríguez Galarza	National Action Party (Mexico)	2009–2012	61st Congress
2012	Esther Angélica Martínez Cárdenas	Institutional Revolutionary Party	2012–2015	62nd Congress
2015	Érika Irazema Briones Pérez	Party of the Democratic Revolution	2015–2018	63rd Congress
2018	José Ricardo Gallardo Cardona (Note: Gallardo Cardona was originally elected for the PRD but after February 2019 sat as an independent. In September 2019 he joined the PVEM.)	Party of the Democratic Revolution Ecologist Green Party of Mexico	2018–2021	64th Congress
2021	Juan Manuel Navarro Muñíz	Ecologist Green Party of Mexico	2021–2024	65th Congress
2024	José Luis Fernández Martínez	Ecologist Green Party of Mexico	2024–2027	66th Congress

== Presidential elections ==
San Luis Potosí's 2nd district
Election	District won by	Party or coalition	%
2018	Andrés Manuel López Obrador	Juntos Haremos Historia	41.0474
2024	Claudia Sheinbaum Pardo	Sigamos Haciendo Historia	62.1701
