= Everardo =

Everardo ([e.βe.ˈɾaɾ.ðo]) is a Spanish male given name. It is cognates with the English name Everard, and is ultimately derived from the Old Germanic name Eberhard.

Notable people with this name include:

- Everardo Backheuser, Brazilian geopolitician
- Everardo Cristóbal (born 1986), Mexican sprint canoeist
- Everardo Dias (1883–1966), Brazilian journalist
- Everardo Elizondo, Mexican economist
- Everardo Múzquiz (born 1911), Mexican sprinter
- Everardo Villarreal Salinas (born 1978), Mexican politician
- Everardo Zapata Santillana (born 1926), Peruvian teacher and author of Coquito
- Francisco Everardo Oliveira Silva (born 1965), best known by his stage name Tiririca, Brazilian actor
- José Everardo Nava (born 1961), Mexican politician
- Juan Everardo Nithard (1607–1681), Austrian priest

== As surname ==
- Milton Castellanos Everardo (1920–2011), Mexican politician and lawyer
