= Enriqueta Legorreta =

Mexican soprano and activist (1914–2010)

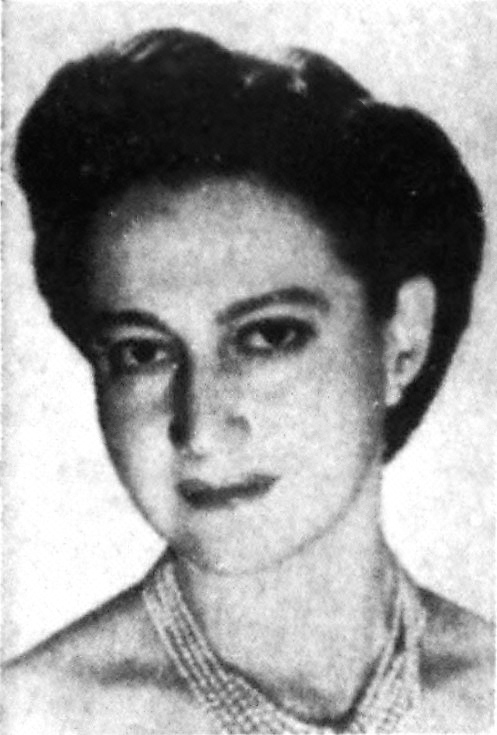
- Legorreta in 1943
- Born: Enriqueta Legorreta López; 25 July 1914; Mexico City, Mexico
- Died: 15 December 2010 (aged 96); Aguascalientes, Mexico
- Education: Conservatorio Nacional de Música
- Occupations: Soprano; activist
- Years active: 1941–1998
- Children: 5, including Enriqueta and Rodrigo

Enriqueta Legorreta (25 July 1914 – 15 December 2010) was a Mexican soprano and activist. She grew up in Mexico City and studied opera at the Conservatorio Nacional de Música. Debuting in 1941, she earned praise for her portrayal of Sieglinde in Wagner's Die Walküre and was noted as the first Mexican woman to sing a Wagnerian opera. She was one of the pioneering singers who joined and performed in the inaugural season of the Ópera Nacional (National Opera), performing Leonora in Beethoven's Fidelio in 1943. During her career, which lasted into the mid-1970s, she sang with many well-known conductors and musicians, including Claudio Arrau, Leonard Bernstein, Pablo Casals, Igor Stravinsky, and Isaac Stern. She was also involved in protests against the opera association to ensure that singers were paid for their professional work, rather than their affiliations with officials.

From the 1980s, Legorreta became concerned about links between pollutants and health. She volunteered for clean-up efforts at the Parque Real de San Lucas (Royal Park of San Lucas) sponsored by the Asociación Ecológica de Coyoacán (Ecological Association of Coyoacán). After the 1985 Mexico City earthquake, she and her family participated in humanitarian efforts to help victims of the disaster. Seeking healthier surroundings, the extended family moved to Aguascalientes in 1987. Concerned at the lack of interest in addressing environmental issues, she organized recycling measures and related projects. These led in 1992 to the establishment of the Asociación Conciencia Ecológica (Ecological Consciousness Association), for which she served as director until 1998 and as life president until her death in 2010. She was twice recognized with the Aguascalientes state prize for Environmental Merit, in 2007 and posthumously in 2019.

== Early life and education ==
Enriqueta Legorreta López was born on 25 July 1914 in Mexico City to Enriqueta López-Valdés Ocampo and Juan de Dios Legorreta. Her father was a social reformer, motivational speaker, and author. She studied music under Franz Steiner, an Austrian refugee who served as professor of opera at the Conservatorio Nacional de Música and would later become a co-founder of the Compañía Ópera de México (Opera of Mexico Company). She performed her first aria with the company in 1940, the year it was created.

== Career ==
=== Opera (1941–1976) ===
Legorreta made her public debut in 1941 at the Palacio de Bellas Artes, performing the role of Sieglinde in Wagner's Die Walküre. A review by Jesús Bal y Gay written for Musical America noted that she "overshadowed all the other artists on the stage" and showed promise for the future. Ricardo Miranda, a musicologist, professor at the Universidad Veracruzana and collaborator for The New Grove Dictionary of Opera, noted that the highlight of the inaugural season was the discovery of three Mexican women singers, María Luisa Enríquez, Irma González, and Legorreta. In 1943, the opera season was organized by the Instituto Nacional de Bellas Artes y Literatura (National Institute of Fine Arts and Literature) and led to the creation of the new company the Asociación Nacional de Ópera (National Opera Association). The season was launched with the performance of Beethoven's Fidelio at the Palacio, with Legorreta singing the title role. Verna Millan in a review for Musical America said of Legorreta's performance, that it was a warm and relatable interpretation, although the singer was inexperienced and her voice had a more lyric than dramatic quality.

On 8 July 1944, in Miguel Hidalgo, Mexico City, Legorreta married Mario Medellín Ocádiz. He was an accountant and would later found an ice cream factory in Mexico City. They had five children — Mario Pintor, a musician; Enriqueta, an environmental activist; Alejandro Claudio; Juan; and Rodrigo, an ecologist. In 1945, Legorreta and pianist Carmen Castillo Betancourt presented Mozart's Requiem with the choir of the Conservatorio Nacional and the Orchestra of the Musician's Union. The orchestra was under the direction of José Yves Limantour and the performance was part of the Mozart Festival hosted by the Palacio de Bellas Artes. Legorreta was one of the featured soloists, along with pianist Claudio Arrau, contralto Oralia Domínguez, soprano González, and violinist Isaac Stern for a special concert given for Mexico's fifth opera season in 1948. Igor Stravinsky conducted the soloists in the event which featured his own works, Jeu de cartes (Card Party), Concerto for Strings, the Divertimento from Le Baiser de la fée (The Fairy's Kiss), and Le chant du rossignol (The Song of the Nightingale). Legorreta performed a solo concert accompanied by Maria Kokowska in the Ponce Salon of the Instituto Mexicano Norteamericano (Mexican-North American Institute) which featured two pieces each by Salvador Moreno and Manuel Ponce, Spirituals and pieces by George Gershwin, and Jerome Kern in 1956.

Legorreta continued singing with several different groups in the 1960s and 1970s, performing with Pablo Casals as a soloist at the festival bearing his name in Acapulco in 1960, with the Symphonic Orchestra of the National Autonomous University of Mexico in 1961, and sang on KQED TV's program Spanish-American Hour in a 1964 broadcast. She appeared as Madame Lidoine in Poulenc's Dialogues of the Carmelites for the 1965 opera season, and the following year sang under the direction of Luis Ximénez in the second season of the Orquesta Sinfónica del Noroeste (Northwest Symphony Orchestra). In 1967, Legorreta performed music accompanied by Ramón Mier and the Mexican Children's Choir for a lecture made by Carmen Sordo of the Musical Research Department of the Instituto Nacional de Bellas Artes, which focused on music from the period of Benito Juárez's presidency. The concert-lecture was held at the Mexican-Israeli Cultural Institute. She performed with Leonard Bernstein in 1969 in the opera-concerto Trouble in Tahiti. Legorreta and Guillermo Salvador were the featured soloists for the 1972 summer season of the Orquesta Sinfónica Nacional, conducted by Luis Herrera de la Fuente at the Alcazar del Castillo de Chapultepec (Imperial Chamber of Chapultepec Castle) and repeated later that year at the Conservatorio Nacional. In 1976, she was part of the production Música en la Pinacoteca (Music in the Art Gallery), which was performed with the Orquesta de Cámara de la Ciudad de México (Chamber Orchestra of Mexico City), under the direction of Miguel Bernal.

Beginning in the late 1960s, social unrest led to political actions both globally and in Mexico. Student protests in 1968 erupted because of frustration with the economy, repressive government policies and widespread corruption, as well as unequal opportunity and treatment for broad sectors of Mexican society. Though begun by students, the movement spread quickly to other segments of the population, which demanded social change. Sopranos Legorreta, Judith Sierra, and Aurora Woodrow led demonstrations of musicians against the policies of the National Institute of Fine Arts and Secretariat of Public Education. They protested the pay scheme that distributed the national subsidy or scholarships for opera to singers who were not qualified, working, or performing. In 1975, they formed the Asociación Nacional de Cantantes de Opera (National Association of Opera Singers) advocating payment based on merit, professionalism, and free of political allegiance.

=== Environmental activism (1980s–2010) ===
The Mexican environmental movement began to emerge at the end of the 1970s and early 1980s. Increases in pollution soared in Mexico City, causing health complications for inhabitants. Concentration of contaminants like carbon monoxide, hydrocarbons, nitrous oxide, sulfur dioxide and levels of cadmium and lead in the blood of the city's residents was four times higher than those in Tokyo and routinely exceeded international standard amounts. People whose family members had died from cancer and other diseases like dysentery, hepatitis, and typhoid, began to question the links between disease and the environment. Concerned activists formed the Asociación Ecológica de Coyoacán (Ecological Association of Coyoacán) around this time, and Legorreta volunteered for the organization. She urged her children to participate in activities to clean up the Parque Real de San Lucas (Royal Park of San Lucas) in the borough of Coyoacán.

The government was unable to address the devastation which occurred following the 1985 Mexico City earthquake. As a result, Legorreta and her family organized soup kitchens, gathered and distributed medical supplies, and provided shortwave radio services to their community. In 1987, hoping to enjoy a better quality of life, the extended family relocated to Aguascalientes City, Mexico. When she arrived, Legorreta searched for another environmental organization with which she could participate. She discovered a group that was working to stop a housing development in the Fraccionamiento Bosques (Bosques neighborhood) in favor of creating a park. The group was successful, but soon disbanded. Wishing to continue efforts aimed at environmental protection, she broadcast an invitation to form an ecological association on the radio station of the Autonomous University of Aguascalientes in 1988. In addition to members of her own family, those who answered the call included David Avalos; Juan Claudio, Liliana, Mariana, and Pablo Juárez; Rosalba Landeros; Carmen López de Tenorio; Esther Naranjo; and Gerardo, Humberto, and Marisol Tenorio.

The group contacted the priest of the Templo de los Dolores and worked out a plan to exchange recyclable waste for tree saplings. A local facility agreed to remove the recyclable donations and the Directorate of Parks and Gardens provided the trees. The event was successful and led the group to take on other projects, such as clean up of local parks and rivers. In 1992, the group was formally organized into the Asociación Conciencia Ecológica (Ecological Consciousness Association), directed by Legorreta. For the next six years, she headed the association, before handing the directorship over to her daughter. She remained the honorary life president until 2010. In 2007, she was awarded the Aguascalientes state prize for Environmental Merit.

== Death and legacy ==
Legorreta died on 15 December 2010 in Aguascalientes City and a memorial honoring her life's work was held two days later. Legorreta is remembered as one of the Mexican opera singers who performed in the inaugural season of the Ópera Nacional (National Opera) and the first Mexican woman to perform a Wagnerian opera in Mexico. Posthumously, she was honored in 2019 with a second award of the Aguascalientes state prize for Environmental Merit, in recognition of her pioneering role in developing environmental awareness in the state.
