= Sara Rocha Medina =

Mexican politician

- Born: 9 October 1967 (age 58); Estación Catorce, San Luis Potosí, Mexico
- Occupation: Politician
- Political party: PRI

María Sara Rocha Medina (born 9 October 1967) is a Mexican politician affiliated with the Institutional Revolutionary Party.

A graduate of the Autonomous University of San Luis Potosi, she worked as a lawyer before serving as municipal president of Catorce from 1995 to 1997. In the 2003 mid-terms she was elected to the Chamber of Deputies as a plurinominal deputy, and she returned to Congress in the 2018 general election for San Luis Potosí's first district.
