= Juventino =

Juventino is a given name. Notable people with the name include:

- Juventino Castro y Castro (1918–2012), Mexican judge and politician
- Juventino Kestering (1946–2021), Brazilian Roman Catholic bishop
- Alfonso Juventino Nava (born 1952), Mexican politician
- Juventino Rosas (1868–1894), Mexican composer and violinist
- Juventino Castro Sánchez (1919–2006), Mexican transportation and political entrepreneur
- Juventino Sánchez (born 1945), Mexican sports shooter

== See also ==
- Santa Cruz de Juventino Rosas, Mexican city (and municipality) in the state of Guanajuato
