= Irma González (soprano) =

Mexican operatic soprano (1916–2008)

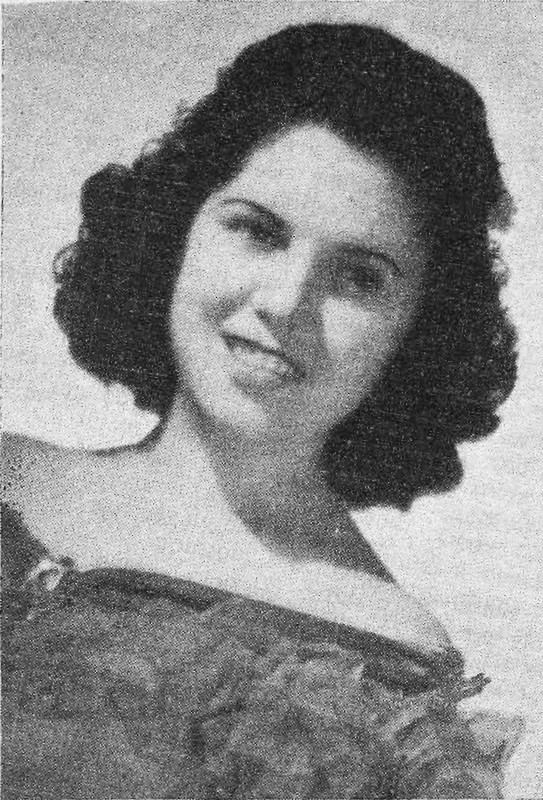
Irma González (1944)

Irma González (8 October 1916–4 December 2008) was a Mexican soprano at the National Opera of Mexico where she performed for almost 40 years. Selected by the opera director Carlos Chávez, she made her debut there in 1941 as Pamina in Mozart's The Magic Flute and went on to appear in leading roles in a wide variety of productions. She also gave concerts and recitals and appeared as a guest performer in some 15 countries. González is remembered in particular for appearing as Liù in Puccini's Turandot, not only in Mexico but in Buenos Aires and Barcelona. She trained many successful opera singers, including Francisco Araiza and Ricardo Bernal.

== Biography ==
Born in Mexico City on 8 October 1916, Irma González was introduced to singing at an early age by her mother who had studied at the National Conservatory. When she was eight, she also attended the conservatory studying music theory and piano under Manuel Ponce, giving her a solid background for developing her voice as it matured under María Bonilla as her voice developed. She was chosen by Chávez to continue her studies under Serge Koussevitzky at the Berkshire Festival School near Boston. While there, she appeared as Mimi in Puccini's La bohème.

She embarked on her career in 1935. Four years later, with Carlos Chávez conducting the Mexican Symphonic Orchestra, she performed in the Mexican premiere of Alban Berg's opera suite Lulu. Her official operatic debut was in 1941 when she appeared as Pamina in Mozart's The Magic Flute. In the early 1940s, she also performed in the United States, appearing with the San Francisco Opera and in a concert at Carnegie Hall commemorating Mexico's independence.

Other notable appearances included the title role in Puccini's Madame Butterfly, Mimi in Gounod's Faust, and Desdemona in Rossini's Otello. In 1977, she appeared with the Mexican Opera as Liù in Puccini's Turandot. Her final stage performance was in 1980 as Madame Butterfly at the Palacio de Minería in Mexico City.

Over a period of some 50 years, she trained many successful opera singers including Francisco Araiza and Ricardo Bernal.

Irma González died at her home in Mexico City on 4 December 2008, aged 92.
