= Enriqueta Medellín =

Mexican surgeon and environmentalist (1948–2022)

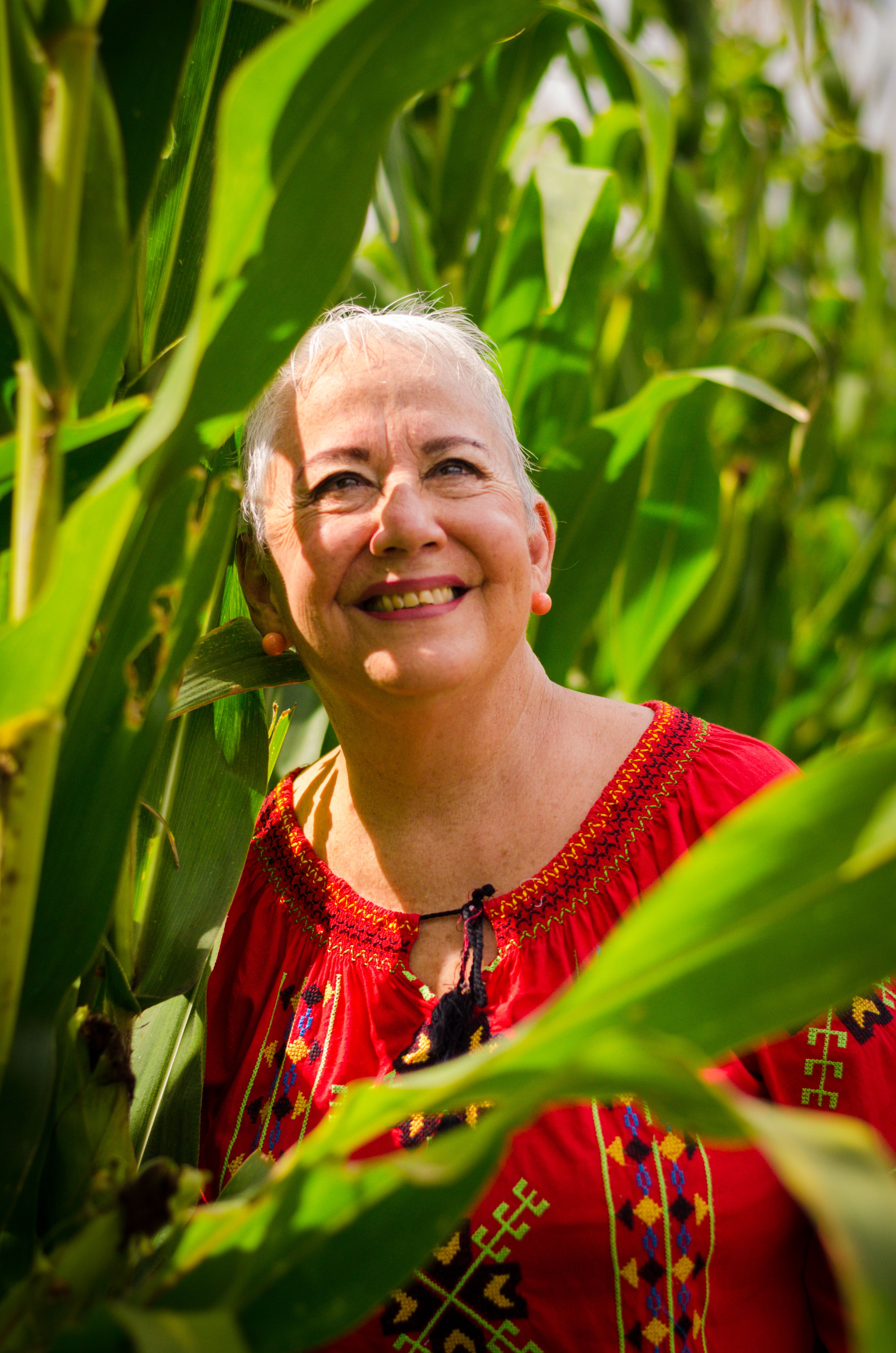
- Medellín in 2021
- Born: María Enriqueta Medellín Legorreta; 10 December 1948; Mexico City, Mexico
- Died: 6 January 2022 (aged 73); Aguascalientes, Mexico
- Education: National Autonomous University of Mexico
- Occupations: Surgeon; environmentalist
- Children: 2
- Mother: Enriqueta Legorreta
- Relatives: Rodrigo Medellín (sibling); Mario Pintor (sibling)

Enriqueta Medellín (10 December 1948 – 6 January 2022) was a Mexican surgeon and environmentalist. Raised in Mexico City, from a young age she participated in projects to clean up the city and became interested in the links between disease and the environment. She earned a degree as a medical surgeon from the National Autonomous University of Mexico and specialized in human genetics. She also studied environmental education and management.

After participating in humanitarian aid projects following the 1985 Mexico City earthquake, she and her extended family relocated to Aguascalientes City in 1987, where she worked as a surgeon while becoming known for environmental activism. Along with her mother and other activists, she founded the association Conciencia Ecológica (Ecological Consciousness) in 1992. This group of activists carried out the first recycling project in the state and introduced numerous projects to raise awareness on waste, teach people about preserving the environment, and protest against developmental projects that caused harm to the environment. She was involved at the local, state, national, and international levels in the creation of policy to protect ecosystems.

Medellín was the first person to be awarded the state prize for Environmental Merit in 2006 and received Mexico's highest honor for environmentalists, the Premio al Mérito Ecológico (Ecological Merit Award) in 2012. In 2020, she received the Biotopo de Oro (Golden Biotope) from the National College of Ecological Doctors and the following year was granted the Aguascaliente Prize in the Clear Water category. The state's ecological and tree replenishment facility was renamed as the Queta Medellín Ecological Center in 2021. At the time of her death in 2022, Medellín was one of the most prominent environmental activists in the central region of Mexico. Posthumously, the municipality of Aguascalientes created the Enriqueta Medellín Prize in her honor to mark contributions by individuals and organizations who have made exemplary efforts to better the community and environment.

== Early life and education ==
María Enriqueta Medellín Legorreta was born on 10 December 1948 in Mexico City to Enriqueta Legorreta López and Mario Medellín Ocádiz and was baptized two days later in the San Cosme Parish Catholic Church. Familiarly known as Queta, she had an older brother, Mario, who is a musician, and three younger siblings, Alejandro Claudio, Juan, and Rodrigo, a biologist. Her father was an accountant and founder of an ice cream factory, while her mother was an opera singer and activist, who led singers to strike against the Palacio de Bellas Artes. Legorreta also volunteered for the Asociación Ecológica de Coyoacán (Ecological Association of Coyoacán) and involved her children in activities to clean up the Parque Real de San Lucas (Royal Park of San Lucas) in the borough of Coyoacán. The death of Medellín's brother Juan in 1969 from cancer sparked Medellín's curiosity in the relationship between disease and the environment.

Medellín graduated from the National Autonomous University of Mexico (UNAM) as a medical surgeon, and earned her PhD in clinical human genetics. She also studied environmental education and management. She married Javier López de la Peña, a cardiologist, and they had two children. Although she professionally worked as a surgeon, Medellín became known for her environmental activism. The 1985 Mexico City earthquake caused devastation that authorities were unable to adequately address and the family began organizing soup kitchens, gathering medical supplies, and providing shortwave radio services to help their neighbors. Longing for a better quality of life, the extended family relocated in 1987 to Aguascalientes City.

== Career ==
Arriving in the State of Aguascalientes, the family searched for an environmental association and joined in the successful fight to stop development in the Fraccionamiento Bosques (Forest Subdivision) and instead create a park on the land. As there was no other group of environmentalists in the state at that time, Enriqueta Legorreta, Medellín's mother, issued an invitation to form an association on the radio station of the Autonomous University of Aguascalientes. Academics and other concerned citizens joined together to start an ecological group. They planned a recycling event at a local church, the Templo de los Dolores (Temple of Sorrows), and Legorreta made a further radio broadcast urging citizens to help. To encourage participation, a recycling company agreed to take the waste and the city donated saplings to exchange for waste and promote an urban reforestation program.

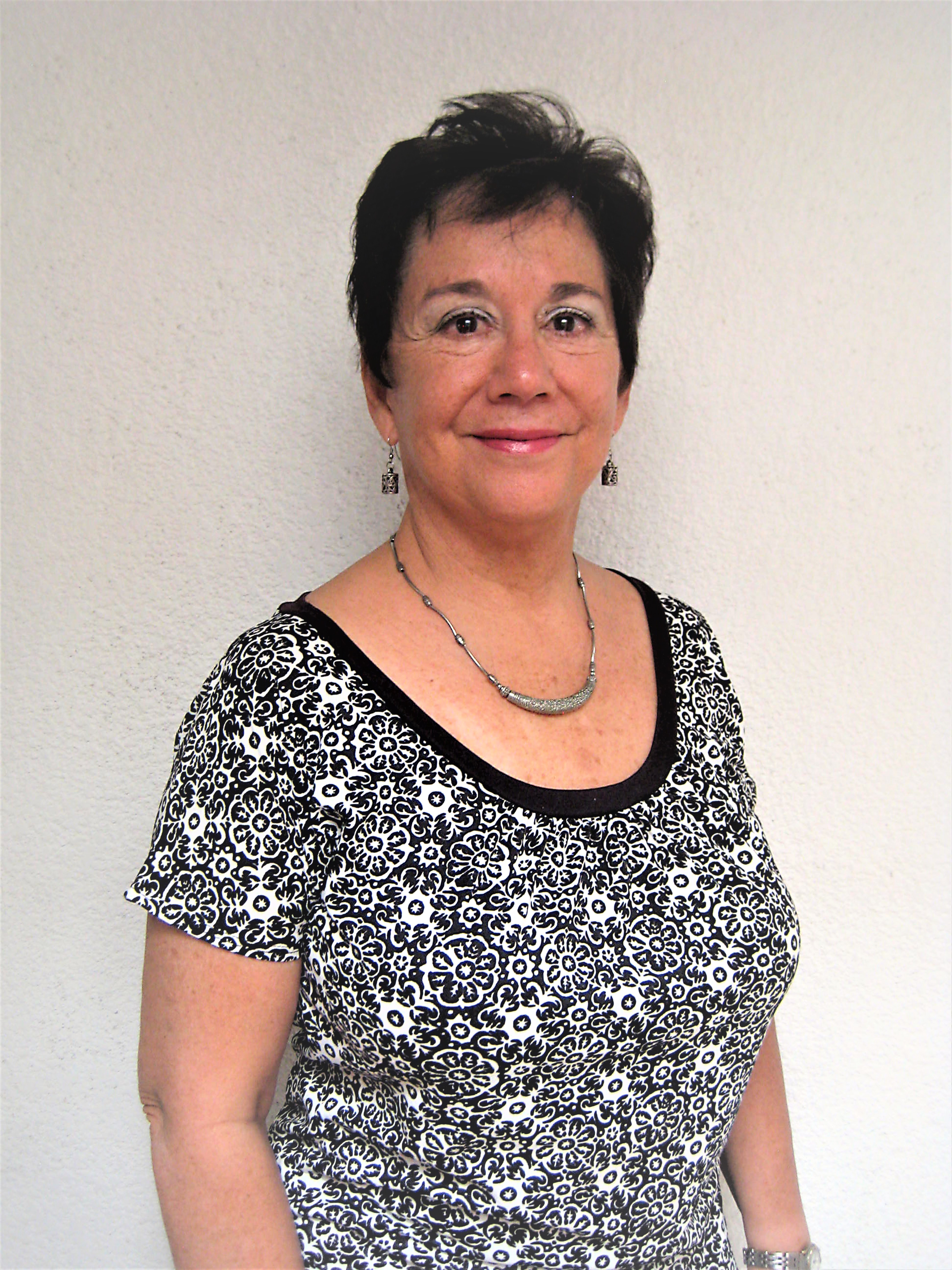
Medellín in 2012

Based on the success of that recycling effort, in 1992 the association Conciencia Ecológica (Ecological Consciousness) was co-founded by Legorreta, Medellín, Abraham de Alba, Humberto Tenorio, and others. The following year, they initiated a clean-up along the San Pedro River. Those initial efforts soon led to recycling collection centers being established in the area's shopping malls in 1994. Not all of the programs went smoothly. In 1995, when protesting construction of a Texas Instruments facility in a residential neighborhood, Medellín became the target of harassment. She personally received threats and her family members and home were photographed by people in favor of the construction. In conjunction with public schools and colleges, scouting organizations, and others, in 1999 she launched the campaign Un cuaderno para tu cuaderno (A Notebook for Your Notebook). The idea behind the program was to collect textbooks and notebooks at the end of the school year and redistribute the books and unused paper, rebound into new notebooks, for use in rural schools. The campaign ran for fifteen years and was estimated to have benefited 10,000 students.

Medellín served on Semarnat's Advisory Council for Sustainable Development, as the first representative from Aguascalientes. She was elected president of the Western Central Regional Council, which coordinates the environmental policies of six Mexican states. She created educational campaigns and wrote books aimed at increasing awareness of environmental protection among the general public. She was influential in securing passage of the State of Aguascalientes' Environmental Protection Law in 1999 and served the government by participating in environmental impact studies and creating public policies. They included activities such as examining dye pollutants in the San Pedro River introduced by manufacturers, the death of large numbers of migratory birds in the area of the El Niágara dam, and loss of habitat and greenspaces because of infrastructure projects. These experiences led to her selection in 2002 as Mexico's delegate to the Earth Summit held in September in Johannesburg, South Africa, and as a Latin American delegate to the United Nations Commission on Sustainable Development in November.

Mexico signed the Earth Charter in 2002, and Medellín along with other activists began working to implement its incorporation in educational programs. Through the Earth Charter Initiative, they trained teachers, administrative staff and management, as well as parents and students about the need for sustainability projects and how they could be implemented in daily life and educational programs. She lectured at numerous schools and civic organizations in states besides Aguascalientes, including Morelia, Querétaro, and Sinaloa. Her lectures focused on recycling, the importance of plants in the environment, global warming, damage to the planet caused by pollutants, and consumer waste and overspending. In addition to speaking engagements, Medellín wrote six books on the environment. She spearheaded a program to reclaim used batteries, placing collection boxes in OXXO convenience stores, which were then retrieved by municipal workers. Following her mother's death in 2010, Medellín became president and worked full time at Conciencia Ecológica.

Medellín was the inaugural recipient of the Premio Estatal al Mérito Ambiental de Aguascalientes (Aguascalientes State Prize of Environmental Merit) in 2006. She was honored in 2012 with the Premio al Mérito Ecológico (Ecological Merit Award), Mexico's highest award for ecological distinction. The award recognizes persons or organizations that teach sustainability or develop and strengthen policies aimed at protecting the environment. The following year, she protested against construction of a Nissan assembly plant on the banks of the San Pedro River that was extracting excessive amounts of sand from neighboring streams. In 2020, the Colegio Nacional de Doctores en Ecología (National College of Ecological Doctors) awarded her the Biotopo de Oro (Golden Biotope) to honor her work in habitat preservation. She was honored in 2021 by the municipality of Auguascalientes with the Aguascaliente Prize in the Clear Water (Agua Clara) category. Simultaneously it was announced that the Tree-planting Center of the state's ecological facility would be renamed in her honor, as the Queta Medellín Ecological Center.

== Death and legacy ==
Medellín died of colon cancer on 6 January 2022 in Auguascalientes. At the time of her death she was recognized as one of the most prominent environmental activists in the state and central region of Mexico. Recognizing her work in influencing local and state policy on environmental issues, El Clarinete, a local newspaper, reported that Medellín had also helped rescue a city park, La Pona, as well as a state park, Bosque de Cobos. Posthumously, the City Council of Aguascalientes established the Premio Enriqueta Medellín (Enriqueta Medellín Prize) to be awarded annually to individuals or organizations which promote community well-being and focus on the environment. Among the categories to be recognized by the award are excellence in development of the arts, diversity, economy, environment, health, inclusion, women, and youth. There is also a special category which recognizes civil associations that have provided social services for at least fifteen years. The first awards ceremony for the prize took place on 30 September 2022.

== Selected works ==
- Medellín Legorreta, María Enriqueta (2003). Por un mejor ambiente: Libro del Adulto [For a Better Environment: Adult Book] (PDF) (in Spanish) (1st ed.). Mexico City, Mexico: Instituto Nacional para la Educación de los Adultos. ISBN 978-970-23-0499-9.
- Medellín Legorreta, María Enriqueta (2003). Por un mejor ambiente: Folleto Cuidemos el ambiente [For a Better Environment: Let's Take Care of the Environment Booklet] (PDF) (in Spanish) (1st ed.). Mexico City, Mexico: Instituto Nacional para la Educación de los Adultos. ISBN 978-970-23-0712-9.
- Medellín Legorreta, María Enriqueta (2003). Por un mejor ambiente: Cuaderno de trabajo [For a Better Environment: Work Notebook] (PDF) (in Spanish) (1st ed.). Mexico City, Mexico: Instituto Nacional para la Educación de los Adultos. ISBN 978-970-23-0713-6.
- Medellín, Enriqueta; Ventura, Gina Mireya; McDermott, Betty (2008). "Folletos de la Carta de la Tierra para niños de preescolar y primaria" [Earth Charter Booklets for Preschool and Elementary School Children] (PDF). In Vilela, Mirian (ed.). Experiencias educativas con la Carta de la Tierra [Educational Experiences with the Earth Charter] (PDF) (in Spanish). Mexico City: Secretariat of Environment and Natural Resources. pp. 65–72. ISBN 978-9977-925-54-7.
