= Wendy Rodríguez Galarza =

Mexican politician

- Born: 31 May 1982 (age 43); San Luis Potosí, Mexico
- Occupation: Politician
- Political party: PAN

Wendy Guadalupe Rodríguez Galarza (born 31 May 1982) is a Mexican politician from the National Action Party (PAN). In the 2009 midterms she was elected to the Chamber of Deputies to represent San Luis Potosí's 2nd district during the 61st session of Congress.
