= Esther Angélica Martínez =

Mexican politician (born 1970)

- Born: 7 December 1970 (age 55); San Luis Potosí, Mexico
- Occupation: Politician
- Political party: PRI

Esther Angélica Martínez Cárdenas (born 7 December 1970) is a Mexican politician affiliated with the Institutional Revolutionary Party (PRI). In the 2012 general election she was elected to the Chamber of Deputies to represent San Luis Potosí's 2nd district during the 62nd session of Congress.
