= Agustín Leura González =

Mexican politician

- Born: 2 February 1966 (age 60); San Luis Potosí, Mexico
- Occupation: Politician
- Political party: PAN

Agustín Leura González (born 2 February 1966) is a Mexican politician from the National Action Party (PAN). In the 2000 general election he was elected to the Chamber of Deputies to represent San Luis Potosí's 2nd district during the 60th session of Congress.
