= Álvaro Elías Loredo =

Mexican politician (born 1947)

- Born: 19 February 1947 (age 79); Río Verde, San Luis Potosí, Mexico
- Education: Autonomous University of San Luis Potosí
- Occupations: Lawyer and politician
- Political party: PAN

Álvaro Elías Loredo (born 19 February 1947) is a Mexican politician affiliated with the National Action Party (PAN).

Elías Loredo was born in Río Verde, San Luis Potosí, in 1947. In 1972 he earned a degree in law from the Autonomous University of San Luis Potosí (UASLP).

He has been elected to the Chamber of Deputies on three occasions: in 1979, as a plurinominal deputy; and in 1997 and 2003 for San Luis Potosí's 2nd district. He was President of the Directive Board of the Chamber of Deputies from 27 April to 31 August 2006.
