= Adrián Salvador Galarza González =

Mexican politician

- Born: 25 December 1965 (age 60); Mexico
- Education: Universidad Iberoamericana
- Occupation: Politician
- Political party: PAN

Adrián Salvador Galarza González (born 25 December 1965) is a Mexican politician from the National Action Party (PAN). In the 2000 general election he was elected to the Chamber of Deputies to represent San Luis Potosí's 2nd district during the 58th session of Congress.
