= Coquito (book) =

Textbook in spanish

- Author: Everardo Zapata Santillana
- Language: Spanish
- Genre: Textbook

Coquito is a textbook in Spanish written by Everardo Zapata Santillana, Peruvian writer. The book develops a method for learning reading and writing created by its author in 1955.

Coquito sold up to 720,000 copies a year, being distributed across several Latin American countries, and 52 editions have been made of it. The textbook continues to be available in fifteen countries in addition to Peru, including Argentina, Bolivia, Chile, Colombia, Spain, Paraguay, Mexico, Uruguay and Venezuela.

== History ==
Everardo Zapata Santillana was sent by the government of José Luis Bustamante y Rivero to create a school in Punta de Bombon District where he realized that the learning methods were complicated. So he spent seven years designing his own reading method, which he published in 1955 under the title Coquito. This first edition had a print run of 5,000 copies that ran out quickly. As an anecdote said:

"One night I dreamed I had a son named Coquito. When I woke up, I grabbed the book and baptized him in the sink in my room."

— Everardo Zapata Santillana.

In 2025, the Peruvian government, through the Ministry of Culture, declared the first edition from 1955 as Cultural heritage of Peru.
