= Villa de Hidalgo, San Luis Potosí =

Human settlement

Coordinates: 22°27′N 100°42′W

Villa de Hidalgo
- Municipality
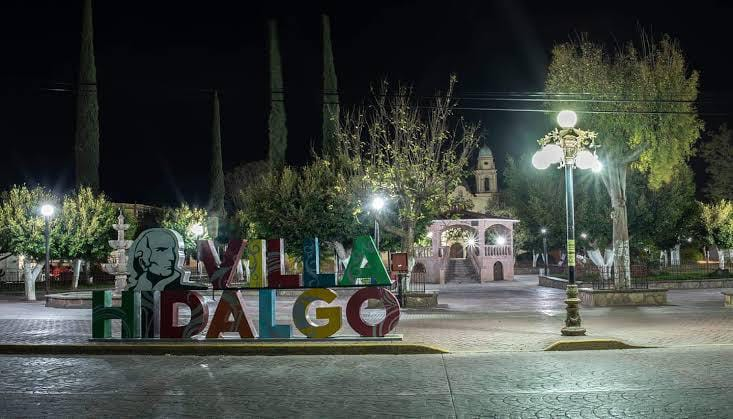

- Location in Mexico Villa de Hidalgo (Mexico)
- Country: Mexico
- State: San Luis Potosí
- Demonym: (in Spanish)
- Time zone: UTC−6 (CST)

Villa de Hidalgo (also, Villa Hidalgo, Picacho, and Iturbide) is a Municipality in the Mexican state of San Luis Potosí.

Villa de Hidalgo is a Municipality in the State Of San Luis Potosí it is composed of Villages and one Central Capital Town (Villa Hidalgo). The Municipality has many villages in it such as: Corcovado (Corcovada), Zapotillo, La Redonda, Tanquito De San Francisco, Tanque De Luna, 20 De Noviembre (Veinte De Noviembre) and Venaditos.

Villa Hidalgo (Capital)

Villa Hidalgo is a town-sized village which is the capital of the Municipality, The Town itself is split into 11 Communities, those being; Zona Centro, Campamento, Magisterial, Zapioris, Lindavista, El Picacho, La Calavera, La Chinana, Ma De Los Angeles, Rancho Grande, and Las Lomas. The town has basic necessities and facilities for health, education, and entertainment (Zona Centro being most of everything.) The City Center is well known as one of the main attractions to visitors from the surrounding areas, it has a Garden in the Center not far from the main Church.
