= José Everardo Nava =

Mexican politician

- Born: 4 January 1961 (age 65); San Luis Potosí, Mexico
- Occupation: Politician
- Political party: PRI

José Everardo Nava Gómez (born 4 January 1961) is a Mexican politician affiliated with the Institutional Revolutionary Party (PRI). In the 2012 general election he was elected to the Chamber of Deputies to represent San Luis Potosí's 1st district during the 62nd session of Congress.
