= Antonio Medellín Varela =

Mexican politician

- Born: 10 July 1957 (age 68); San Luis Potosí, Mexico
- Occupation: Politician
- Political party: PAN

Antonio Medellín Varela (born 10 July 1957) is a Mexican politician from the National Action Party (PAN). In the 2006 general election he was elected to the Chamber of Deputies to represent San Luis Potosí's 1st district during the 60th session of Congress.
