= Everardo Zapata Santillana =

Peruvian teacher and author (born 1926)

Asunto Everardo Zapata Santillana (born 15 August 1926) is a Peruvian elementary school teacher and author of Coquito, a best-selling book, used to teach Spanish-speaking children how to read and write.

== Early life ==
Zapata was born in Tambo Valley, province of Islay in The Department Of Arequipa, Peru on 15 August 1926. His mother died when he was young, and grew up alone with a priest taking care of him. Very early on, he felt the need to study and pursue a career in teaching.

He took his professional training in the Escuela Normal de Varones “San Juan Bautista de La Salle”, Arequipa, where he graduated as an elementary school teacher. He was sent to a small town called Punta de Bombón, Arequipa.

== Coquito ==
In Punta de Bombón he founded a First Grade School in 1952 that now bears his name. After 7 years of research, he developed Coquito - a method to teach children to read, write and think. He was about to name his book "sunset", or "evening", but he dreamed about a very funny and mischievous boy named "Coquito", and decided that that was the correct name for his book.

Coquito was first published and sold in the city of Arequipa in 1955. The print runs remained small until the book started to be printed in Lima, in 1957, by Peruvian publisher Iberia S.A. The number of copies printed and sold grew steadily, and soon Coquito was being sold throughout Peru and in Colombia, Bolivia and Ecuador. To date, over 35 million children in 12 countries –in South America, Central America, the Caribbean, and Spain– have learned how to read by using the Coquito method.

Zapata is also the author of more than 60 published teaching materials, for preschool and first-grade children, all distributed under the corporate brand name Ediciones Coquito. Zapata says he is still looking for better ways to help children and teachers make the learning process easier.

== Personal life ==
Zapata has five children (four boys and one girl) and ten grandchildren. His youngest grandchild, a three-year-old girl, is currently learning how to read with Coquito.

== Honors ==
The Peruvian Department of Education has honored Zapata with the Palmas Magisteriales, its highest teaching award, with the topmost degree of "Amauta". Also, the Mayor of Arequipa awarded him the city's Cultural Gold Medal, and he has been made Honorary Professor by The University of Santa Maria, a Roman Catholic university in Arequipa. He has also received a Gold Medal from the Arequipa Regional Government.
