= Sonia Mendoza Díaz =

Mexican politician

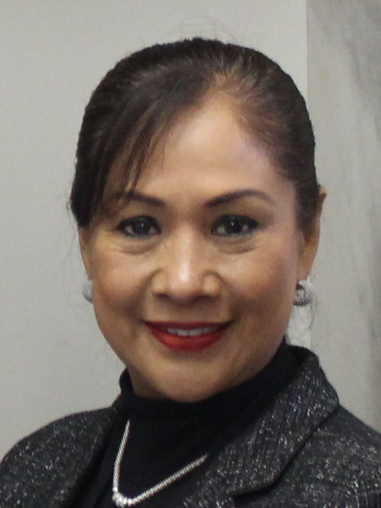
- Díaz in 2017
- Born: 22 February 1969 (age 57); Matehuala, San Luis Potosí, Mexico
- Education: UASLP
- Occupation: Senator
- Political party: PAN

Sonia Mendoza Díaz (born 22 February 1969) is a Mexican politician affiliated with the Ecologist Green Party of Mexico (PVEM). She currently serves as a federal deputy in the LXV Legislature of the Mexican Congress from the state of San Luis Potosí. She previously was a senator of the LXII and LXIII Legislatures, a federal deputy during the LXI Legislature and a local deputy in the LVIII Legislature of the Congress of San Luis Potosí, all while with the National Action Party.
