= Everardo Backheuser =

Brazilian engineer (1879–1951)

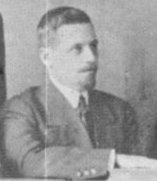
- c. 1913
- Born: May 23, 1879; Niterói, Rio de Janeiro, Empire of Brazil
- Died: January 1, 1951 (aged 71); Niterói, Rio de Janeiro, Brazil
- Education: Polytechnic School
- Notable work: Curso de geopolítica geral e do Brasil (1952)

Everardo Adolpho Backheuser (May 23, 1879 – January 1, 1951) was a Brazilian engineer, geographer, educational theorist, and writer. He is considered a forerunner of Brazilian geopolitical thought.

== Biography ==
Born in Niterói into a family of French and German immigrants, the son of a tradesman, Backheuser completed his secondary education in the traditional Colégio Pedro II before enrolling at the Polytechnic School, where he studied civil engineering, mathematics, and physics.

Concerned with the living conditions of the lower classes in Rio de Janeiro, Backheuser was involved in the city's urban reform efforts, proposing hygienic and social interventions. In 1907, he was appointed professor at the Polytechnic School, where he taught several disciplines, including descriptive geometry, architecture, construction, mineralogy, geology, and botany.

As Backheuser's academic career progressed, with him earning a doctorate from his alma mater, he became increasingly interested in pedagogy. In 1924, he was among the founding members of the Brazilian Association of Education (pt). Following his retirement from academia, he traveled to Germany, where he had contact with reformpädagogik ideas. Upon his return to Brazil, Backheuser assumed the direction of several schools, where he implemented pedagogical principles that combined Catholic and New School elements.

In the wake of the Revolution of 1930, he was appointed a professor at the Instituto Geográfico Militar, now integrated to the Instituto Militar de Engenharia. In the Constituent Assembly that drafted the Constitution of 1934, Beckhauser led the commission of the Society of Geography of Rio de Janeiro (pt) tasked with studying Brazil's territorial administration, and submitted a report to President Getúlio Vargas advocating greater centralization of power and the restoration of the old system of provinces. Backheuser also proposed the relocation of the capital to the interior of the country and the establishment of ten federal territories along Brazil's borders. According to the Army General Carlos de Meira Mattos, Backheuser's ideias ''produced the policy of strengthening our bordering regions''.

In the 1930s, he adhered to integralism, becoming one of the movement's guiding thinkers, particularly in pedagogy. In 1936, he was invited by the Minister of Education Gustavo Capanema to provide an assessment about the National Plan of Education. Between 1938 and 1945, Backheuser presided over the National Commission of Primary Education. He was one of the founding-members and the first secretary of the Brazilian Academy of Sciences, and the founder and first president of the Brazilian Club of Esperanto (Brazila Klubo Esperanto, eo).

== Works ==
- Habitações populares (1906)
- Cristais - Factos e Hipóteses (1916)
- A faixa litorânea do Brasil Meridional. Ontem e hoje (1918)
- A estrutura política do Brasil. Notas prévias (1926)
- A sedução do comunismo (1933)
- Problemas do Brasil.: estrutura geopolítica (1933)
- Ensaio de Biotipologia Educacional (1941)
- Manual de Pedagogia Moderna - Teoria e Prática (1948)
- Curso de geopolítica geral e do Brasil (1952)
