= Alfonso Juventino Nava =

Mexican politician

- Born: 25 January 1952 (age 74); Matehuala, San Luis Potosí, Mexico
- Education: UASLP
- Occupation: Politician
- Political party: PRI

Alfonso Juventino Nava Díaz (born 25 January 1952) is a Mexican politician affiliated with the Institutional Revolutionary Party (PRI). In the 2003 mid-terms he was elected to the Chamber of Deputies to represent San Luis Potosí's 1st district during the 59th session of Congress.
