= Ricardo Bernal =

Mexican lyric tenor

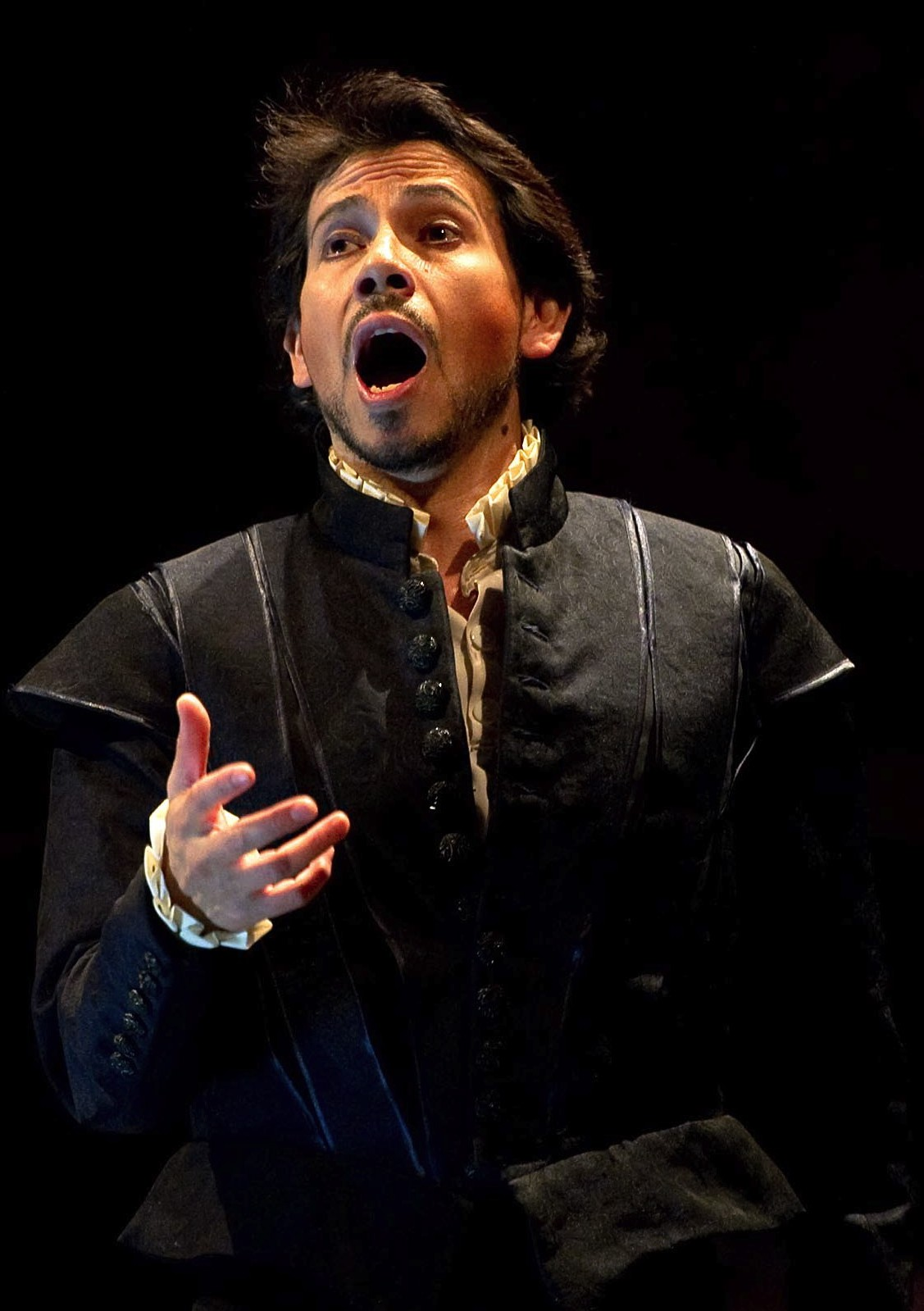
- Ricardo Bernal as Leicester in Maria Stuarda, San Carlo de Nápoles (2010)
- Born: March 30, 1970; Mexico City, Mexico
- Occupation: Operatic tenor

Ricardo Bernal (born March 30, 1970) is a Mexican lyric tenor.

== Biography ==
Born in Mexico City, Bernal started his vocal training at the age of 16 years at the National Conservatory of Music of Mexico under the direction of the soprano Irma Gonzalez and later by the professor in lyric singing, Enrique Jaso. He became a member of the Merola Opera Program in the San Francisco Opera House (USA) and the Opernstudio of Zurich (Switzerland). He also was trained by the mezzo-soprano Viorica Cortez in singing repertoire.

At 18 years old, he made his debut as "Beppe" in the opera I Pagliacci at the Palacio de Bellas Artes in Mexico City. At the beginning of his career, the fact of having easy top notes led him to successfully undertake Rossini's repertoire. However, later his voice developed an ample tessitura which enabled him to sing roles as a strong lyric tenor.

He was the winner of several contests including "Pacific voices" (San Francisco), "Kaffe Peters" (Viena), "Operalia" (Mexico) and Francisco Alonso (Madrid).

In 1996, he became the first soloist of the group of professional singers in Zurich and, the following year at the Teatre of Bonn and Trier until 2000 when he, at the same time, was invited to sing in famous theatres located in Berlin, Cologne, Hamburg and Baden-Baden, interpreting many diverse roles.

Presently, he is continuously performing in leading opera theaters in Costa Rica, Venezuela, Colombia, Argentina, Panama and Mexico.

He also has sung at Covent Garden, Copenhagen Opera House, La Fenice in Venice, Teatro Filarmonico (Verona), Teatro di San Carlo (Naples), Teatro Politeama (Palermo), Teatro Massimo Bellini (Catania), San Francisco Opera House, Washington Opera, Opéra de Marseille and Montpellier among others. In Spain, he has sung in Las Palmas de Gran Canaria, Tenerife, Valladolid, Teatro Español of Madrid, Euskalduna Conference Centre and Concert Hall of Bilbao, the Liceu of Barcelona, and the Madrid Teatro Real.

He has sung next to well-known singers such as Mariella Devia, Sonia Ganassi, Dolora Zajick, Isabel Rey, Inva Mula, Patrizia Ciofi, Plácido Domingo, José Carreras, Juan Pons, Justino Díaz, Carlos Álvarez and Carlos Chausson. He has performed under the baton of directors such as Nello Santi, Pinchas Steinberg, Fabio Luisi, Pier Luigi Pizzi and Jean-Louis Pichon.

== Repertoire ==
=== Opera ===
- Giacomo Puccini
  - La bohème – Rodolfo
  - Gianni Schicchi – Rinuccio
  - Madame Butterfly – Pinkerton
- Vincenzo Bellini
  - I Capuleti e i Montecchi – Tebaldo
  - I puritani – Arturo
- Giuseppe Verdi
  - Rigoletto – Duque de Mantua
  - La traviata – Rodolfo
  - Un ballo in maschera – Riccardo
- Gaetano Donizetti
  - L'elisir d'amore – Nemorino
  - Lucia di Lammermoor – Sir Edgardo de Ravenswood
  - Maria Stuarda– Leicester
- Gioachino Rossini
  - Otello – Otello
  - William Tell – Arnold
- Manuel Penella
  - El gato montés – Rafael Ruiz
  - Don Gil de Alcalá – Don Gil de Alcalá
- Emilio Arrieta
  - Marina – Jorge
- Richard Strauss
  - Der Rosenkavalier – Cantante italiano
- Wolfgang Amadeus Mozart
  - The Magic Flute – Tamino
  - Don Giovanni – Don Ottavio

=== Operetta ===
- Federico Moreno Torroba
  - Luisa Fernanda – Aníbal
- Amadeo Vives
  - Doña Francisquita – Fernando
- Pablo Sorozábal
  - La Tabernera del Puerto – Leandro
  - La Eterna Canción – Montilla

== Discography ==
- Carmina Burana by C. Orff (Mexico)
- Matilde di Shabran by G. Rossini (Germany)
- Gala Latina: Pópera (Spain)
- Goyescas by Granados (France)
