= Villa de Arriaga =

Coordinates: 21°55′N 101°23′W

- Municipality and town
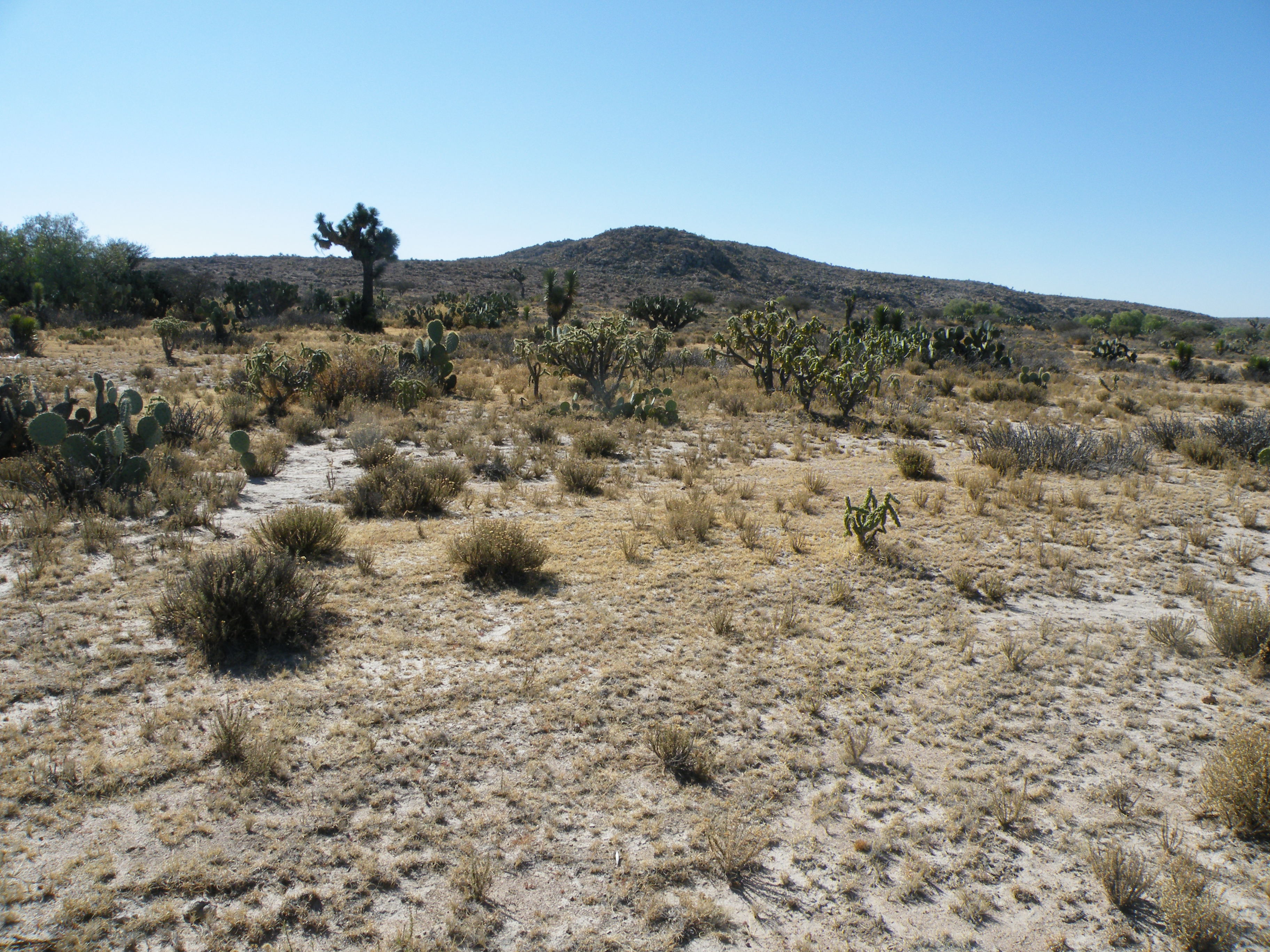
- Interactive map of Villa de Arriaga
- Country: Mexico
- State: San Luis Potosí
- Time zone: UTC-6 (Zona Centro)

Villa de Arriaga is a town and municipality in the central Mexican state of San Luis Potosí.
