= Catorce =

Coordinates: 23°41′N 100°53′W

- Municipality
- Interactive map of Catorce
- Country: Mexico
- State: San Luis Potosí

Population (2005)
  - Total: 9,159
- Time zone: UTC-6 (Zona Centro)

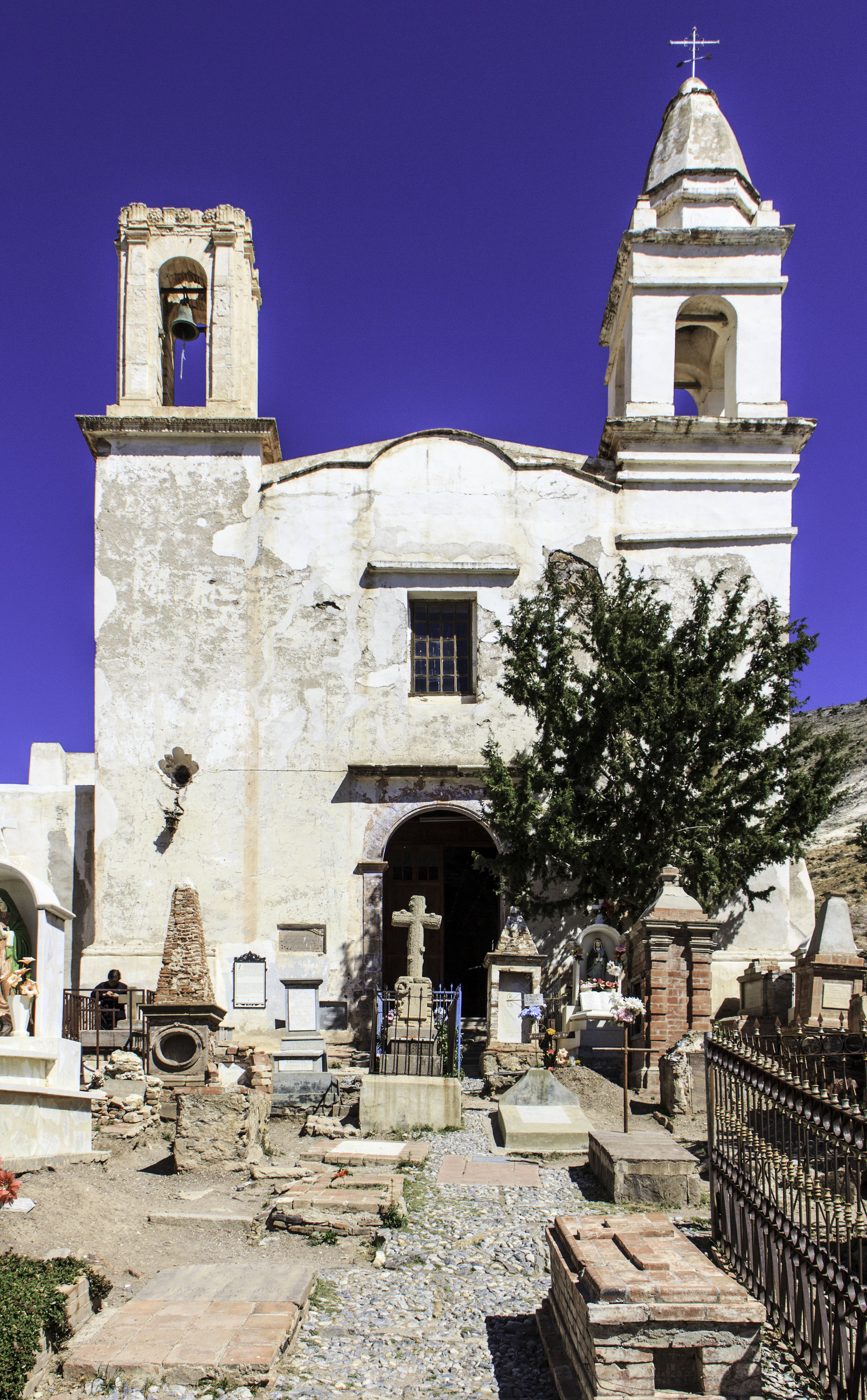
Guadalupe Sanctuary and Cemetery in Catorce

Catorce is a municipality in the central Mexican state of San Luis Potosí. The municipal seat is the pueblo mágico of Real de Catorce.
