= Rodrigo Medellín =

Mexican ecologist and professor

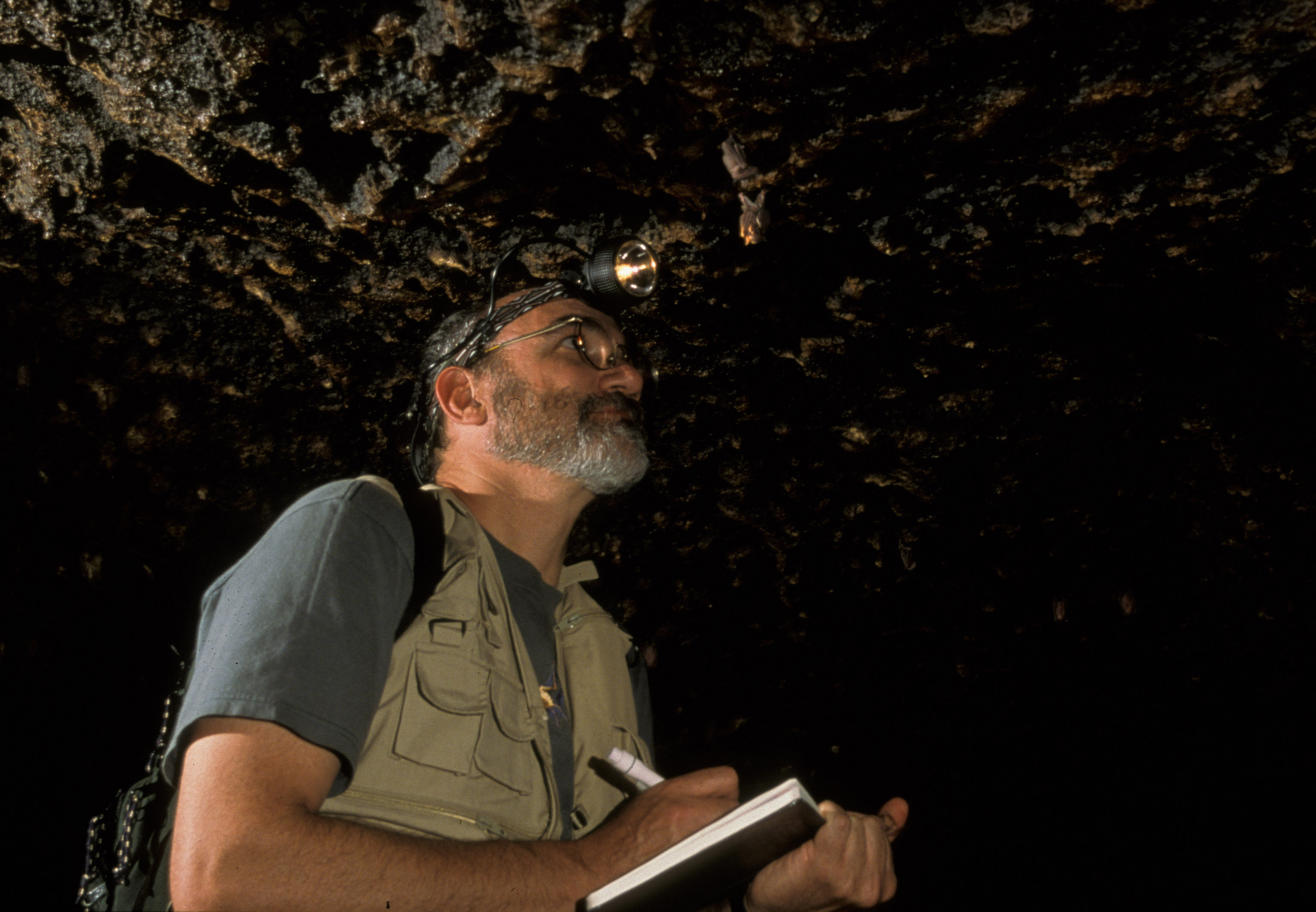
- Born: Rodrigo A. Medellín; 1957 (age 68–69); Mexico City
- Other name: Rodrigo A. Medellín
- Awards: Whitley Award (2004), Whitley Gold Award (2012)
- Scientific career
- Fields: Bat conservation, mammal expert, conservation biology
- Institutions: Instituto de Ecología at the National Autonomous University of Mexico, American Museum of Natural History

Rodrigo A. Medellín is a Mexican ecologist and Senior Professor of Ecology at the Institute of Ecology, University of Mexico (UNAM). Known for his work in bat, jaguar, bighorn sheep and other species conservation, his research has always been designed and conducted to advise conservation policy and conservation decision-making processes in Mexico and 16 other countries for over 40 years.

Medellín uses community ecology, plant-animal interactions, population biology, and molecular ecology to solve conservation problems. He and his team have designed and implemented a three-pronged strategy where research, environmental education, and conservation actions feed back into each other to contribute to the development of activities in his projects.

== Education ==
Medellin received a biology degree from UNAM in 1986 with the thesis La comunidad de murciélagos de Chajul Chiapas. He did his graduate studies at the University of Florida, in Gainesville, Florida. He obtained a PhD with the dissertation Community ecology and conservation of mammals in a Mayan tropical rain forest and abandoned agricultural fields.

== Work ==
Medellín's impact on conservation has been significant, being Councilor of the Commission of Natural Protected Areas (CONANP), his work has resulted in the recovery of endangered species such as the lesser long-nosed or tequila Bat (Leptonycteris yerbabuenae), the creation of new protected natural areas, the valuation of ecosystem services by bats, and the creation of conservation programs in cooperation with industry. For example, the Bat Friendly tequila and mezcal program is quickly becoming an industry standard.

Medellín was Director General of Wildlife of the Mexican Federal Government in 1995–96. Since 1999 he has represented Mexico before the CITES Animals Committee, and was vice-chair of that same Committee for ten years. In 2011 he was elected by the CMS (Convention on Migratory Species) Conference of the Parties as Scientific Councilor. He has been an advisor of the Mexican Federal Government on wildlife issues for over 30 years. Medellín's work in CITES has led to high-level decisions in the context of sustainable use and conservation of sharks, protecting lizards, turtles, tropical fish, many mammals and birds, and promoting international cooperation. For example, between the U.S., Mexico and china in order to join forces and stop the black market and illegal take of totoaba, a fish species whose exploitation accompanies the critically endangered vaquita (Phocoena sinus).

Medellín is a Multidisciplinary Expert Panel (MEP) member of IPBES (UNEP), the Intergovernmental Science-Policy Platform on Biodiversity and Ecosystem Services, His work studying and protecting mammals has spanned many continents, groups, and influenced both subjects through scientific findings applied to policy. Medellín was the first non-U.S., non-European President of the Society for Conservation Biology (SCB) 2013–2015, and served on the board of directors of the organization for over 15 years. He was president of the Mexican Society of Mammalogists, and is the founder and director of the 25-year-old Program for the Conservation of Bats of Mexico (PCMM), and the founding director of the Latin American Network for Bat Conservation RELCOM, which today includes 23 countries. Medellín is also the creator of Global South Bats, a network of bat scientists in Africa, Asia, and Latin America. Rodrigo is co-chair of the Bat Specialist Group of IUCN since 2004. Medellín co-coordinated Mexico's first National Jaguar Census, or CENJAGUAR. He has been a member of the board of directors of the American Society of Mammalogists for over 15 years.

Since 2016 Medellín has been a member of the board of review editors of Science Magazine, and has been associate editor of the Journal of Mammalogy, Conservation Biology, ORYX, and Acta Chiropterologica.

=== Research and lectures ===
Medellín has produced over 250 publications, including over 120 papers in peer-reviewed journals. He is also the author of over 60 books and book chapters on bat ecology and conservation, jaguar conservation and recovery, mammal diversity analyses, and the conservation of large mammals. His work has been cited over 12,000 times. His H factor is 50, and over the past five years he has produced 54 peer-reviewed indexed papers.

Medellín is most comfortable teaching, or in the field with his students. He has continuously taught courses on conservation biology, tropical ecology, and Mammalogy in his home institution, UNAM, and also at other institutions such as Columbia University, University of Costa Rica, International University of Andalusia in Spain, the Kenya Wildlife Service, amongst many others. He is adjunct professor at Columbia University in New York, Andalusia International University, the University of Arizona, and Research Associate at the American Museum of Natural History, Arizona-Sonora Desert Museum, Texas Tech University, and others.

Medellín has directed over 50 thesis and dissertations of students from over 10 countries.

== Achievements, Awards and Recognitions ==
Medellín has received various recognitions. In 2004 he received the Whitley Award for International Nature Conservation from HRH Princess Anne of England, the Gerrit S. Miller Award, given to persons "In recognition of outstanding service and contribution to the field of chiropteran biology", and the 2004 National Nature Conservation Award from Mexico's President Vicente Fox.

In 2007 Medellín received the Aldo Leopold Conservation Award from the American Society of Mammalogists, the Outstanding Alumnus Award from the Department of Wildlife Ecology and Conservation of the University of Florida, and the 2007 Conservation Scientist of the Year from Wildlife Trust in New York City.

Medellín received the 2008 Rolex Award for Enterprise, being only the third Mexican in over 30 years to receive this award. In 2008 he also received Volkswagen's "For the Love of the Planet" award.

The BBVA Banking Foundation selected Medellín as the recipient of their prestigious Premio Fundación BBVA a la Conservación de la Biodiversidad 2011. In 2012 he received the first-ever Whitley Gold Award from Princess Anne of England again, the first individual ever to receive two Whitley Awards. Also in 2012, he was chosen as one of the 50 individuals who move Mexico forward (Quien50) by Expansion Corporate Group. In 2019 the National Geographic Society made Medellín the seventh Explorer-At-Large, the first one not from the U.S. or Europe.

== Media presence ==
Medellín's presence in the media is continuous, with dozens of appearances each year in national and international TV, radio, and press, from BBC, El País, Deutsche Welle, and the Wall Street Journal, to local influential publications.

In 2014 BBC Natural World produced the multi-awarded film "The Bat Man of Mexico", (narrated by David Attenborough) covering Medellín's work on bats. In 2018 National Geographic Society produced the 1-hour documentary titled Giant Carnivorous Bats with Rodrigo Medellín, showcasing his work on these endangered, misunderstood bats.
