= Andrés Manuel López Obrador =

President of Mexico from 2018 to 2024

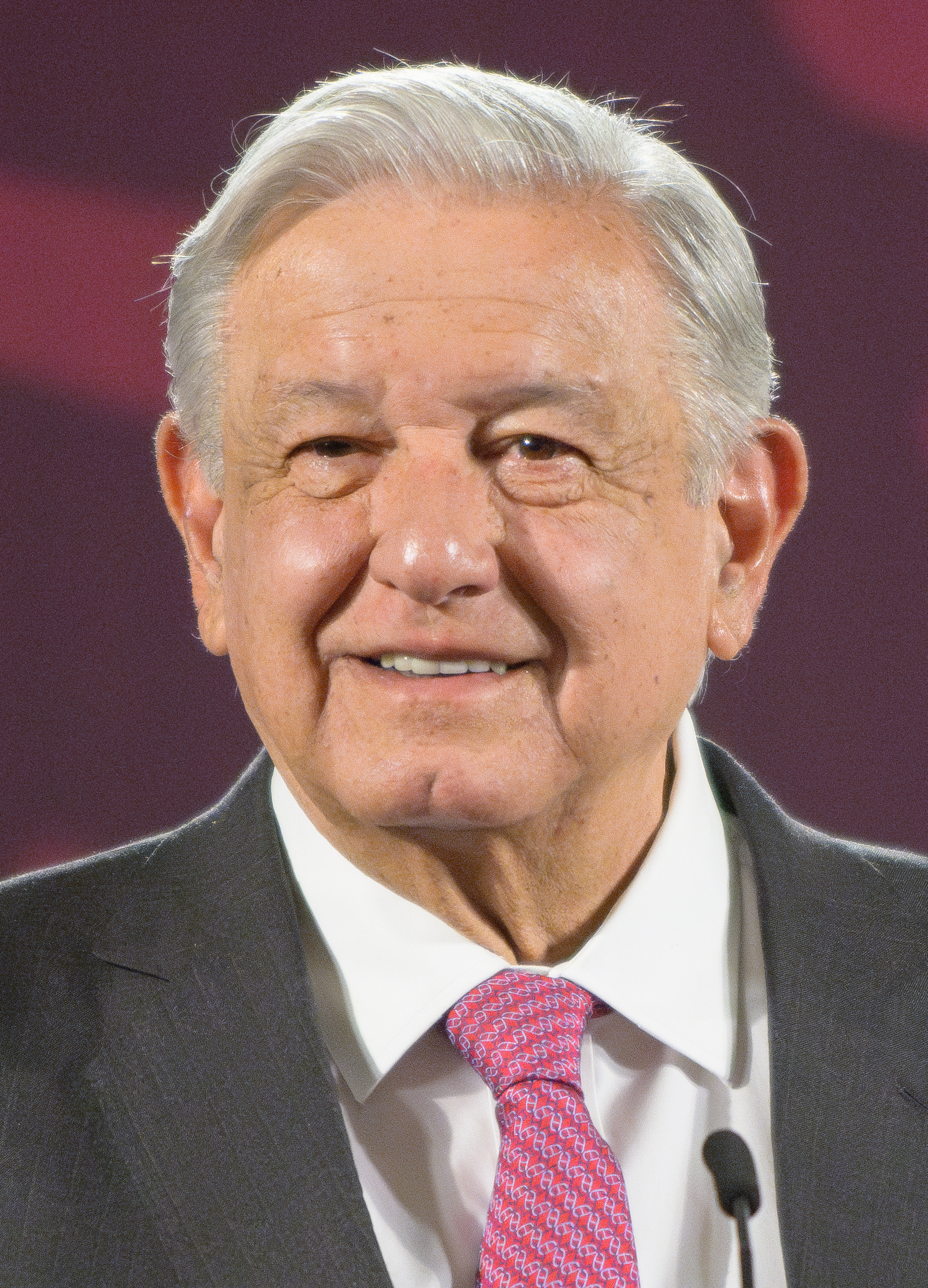
- López Obrador in 2024

65th President of Mexico
- In office 1 December 2018 – 30 September 2024
- Preceded by: Enrique Peña Nieto
- Succeeded by: Claudia Sheinbaum

President pro tempore of CELAC
- In office 8 January 2020 – 7 January 2022
- Preceded by: Jeanine Áñez
- Succeeded by: Alberto Fernández

Head of Government of Mexico City
- In office 5 December 2000 – 29 July 2005
- Preceded by: Rosario Robles
- Succeeded by: Alejandro Encinas Rodríguez
Other offices
President of the National Regeneration Movement
In office 20 November 2015 – 12 December 2017
Preceded by	Martí Batres
Succeeded by	Yeidckol Polevnsky
President of the Party of the Democratic Revolution
In office 2 August 1996 – 10 April 1999
Preceded by	Porfirio Muñoz Ledo
Succeeded by	Pablo Gómez Álvarez

Personal details
- Born: 13 November 1953 (age 73) Tepetitán, Tabasco, Mexico
- Party: National Regeneration Movement (2012–2024) (Note: Morena was not officially registered as a political party until 10 July 2014.)
- Other political affiliations: Party of the Democratic Revolution (1989–2012); Institutional Revolutionary Party (1976–1989)
- Spouses: Rocío Beltrán Medina (m. 1979; died 2003) Beatriz Gutiérrez Müller (m. 2006)
- Children: 4, including Andrés Manuel
- Relatives: Manuela Obrador Narváez (cousin)
- Education: National Autonomous University of Mexico (BA)
- Website: lopezobrador.org.mx

Andrés Manuel López Obrador (Spanish: [anˈdɾes maˈnwel ˈlopes oβɾaˈðoɾ]; born 13 November 1953), also known by his initials AMLO, is a Mexican former politician, political scientist, and writer who served as the 65th president of Mexico from 2018 to 2024 and he also served as Head of Government of Mexico City from 2000 to 2005.

Born in Tepetitán, in the municipality of Macuspana, in the south-eastern state of Tabasco, López Obrador earned a degree in political science from the National Autonomous University of Mexico following a hiatus from his studies to participate in politics. He began his political career in 1976 as a member of the Institutional Revolutionary Party (PRI). His first public position was as director of the Indigenous Institute of Tabasco, where he promoted the addition of books in indigenous languages. In 1989, he joined the Party of the Democratic Revolution (PRD), becoming the party's 1994 candidate for Governor of Tabasco and national leader between 1996 and 1999. In 2000, he was elected Head of Government of Mexico City. During his tenure, his crime, infrastructure, and social spending policies made him a popular figure on the Mexican left. In 2004, his state immunity from prosecution was removed after he refused to cease construction on land allegedly expropriated by his predecessor, Rosario Robles. This legal process lasted a year, ending with López Obrador maintaining his right to run for office.

López Obrador was nominated as the presidential candidate for the Coalition for the Good of All during the 2006 elections, where he was narrowly defeated by the National Action Party (PAN) candidate Felipe Calderón. While the Federal Electoral Tribunal noted some irregularities, it denied López Obrador's request for a general recount, which sparked protests nationwide. In 2011, he founded the National Regeneration Movement (Morena), a civil association. He was a candidate for the Progressive Movement coalition in the 2012 elections, won by the Commitment to Mexico coalition candidate Enrique Peña Nieto. In 2012, he left the PRD after protesting the party's signing of the Pact for Mexico and prior to helping Morena to become a political party. As part of the Juntos Haremos Historia coalition, López Obrador was elected president after a landslide victory in the 2018 general election.

Described as being center-left, progressive, a left-wing populist, social democratic, and an economic nationalist, López Obrador was a national politician for over three decades. During his presidency, he promoted public investment in sectors that had been liberalized under previous administrations and implemented several progressive social reforms. Supporters praised him for promoting institutional renewal after decades of high inequality and corruption and refocusing the country's neoliberal consensus towards improving the state of the working class. Conversely, López Obrador has been criticized for contributing to democratic backsliding, failing to adequately respond to the COVID-19 pandemic, and attempting to appease drug cartels. He left office in September 2024, succeeded by his chosen successor Claudia Sheinbaum, and retired from both electoral politics and public life.

== Early life ==
Andrés Manuel López Obrador was born in Tepetitán, a small village in the municipality of Macuspana, in the southern state of Tabasco, on 13 November 1953. He is the firstborn son of Andrés López Ramón (son of Lorenzo López and Beatriz Ramón) and Manuela Obrador González, Tabasco and Veracruz-based merchants. His younger siblings include José Ramón, José Ramiro, Pedro Arturo, Pío Lorenzo, and twins Candelaria Beatriz and Martín Jesús. His maternal grandfather José Obrador Revuelta was a Cantabrian who arrived as an exile in Mexico from Ampuero, Spain, while his maternal grandmother Úrsula González was the daughter of Asturians. Through his paternal grandparents, López Obrador is also of Indigenous and African descent.

López Obrador attended the only elementary school in town, the Marcos E. Becerra school, managed by the Seventh-day Adventist Church and named after the Mexican poet of the same name. During afternoons, he helped his parents at the La Posadita store. López Obrador began middle school in Macuspana but finished it in the state capital of Villahermosa, where his family moved in the mid-1960s and opened a clothes and shoe store called Novedades Andrés. On 8 June 1969, when he was 15 years old, his brother José Ramón López Obrador died from a gunshot to the head. According to Jorge Zepeda Patterson's Los Suspirantes 2018, José Ramón found a pistol, played with it, and it slipped out of his hands, firing a bullet into his head. The Tabasco newspapers Rumbo Nuevo, Diario de Tabasco, and Diario Presente presented a story where they were both playing around with the pistol and that Andrés Manuel fired it by accident. According to Zepeda Patterson, Andrés Manuel became "taciturn, much more thoughtful" following the incident. López Obrador finished high school and, at age 19, went to Mexico City to study at the National Autonomous University of Mexico (UNAM).

He studied political science and public administration at the UNAM from 1973 to 1976. He returned to school to complete his education after having held several positions within the government of Tabasco and the Institutional Revolutionary Party (PRI). In 1987, he received a degree in political science and public administration after the presentation of his thesis, Proceso de formación del Estado Nacional en México 1821-1867 (Formation Process of the National State in Mexico 1821–1867).

He lived in the Casa del Estudiante Tabasco during his college years on Violeta Street in the Guerrero neighborhood of Mexico City. The institution was financed by the administration of Tabasco governor Mario Trujillo García through efforts of the poet Carlos Pellicer, with whom López Obrador began discussing. There was empathy between the two because the young man raised his concern for the Chontal Maya. After the meeting, the poet invited him to his senate campaign during the 1976 elections. His university professor, Enrique González Pedrero, was another figure that influenced López Obrador's political trajectory.

After attending school from 1973 to 1976, he returned to his native Tabasco, where he held various government positions and was a professor at the Juárez Autonomous University of Tabasco.

== Personal life ==
During his early career, he met Rocío Beltrán Medina, a sociology student, who suggested López Obrador embrace the progressive wing of the PRI. They eventually married on 8 April 1978. They had three sons: José Ramón López Beltrán (born 1981), Andrés Manuel López Beltrán (born 1986), and Gonzalo Alfonso López Beltrán (born 1991). Beltrán Medina died on 12 January 2003 due to respiratory arrest caused by lupus, which she had suffered for several years.

On 16 October 2006, he married Beatriz Gutiérrez Müller, who had worked in the Mexico City government during his tenure as Head of Government of Mexico City. Together they have one son, Jesús Ernesto López Gutiérrez (born 2007).

During his first presidential run, some news reports identified López Obrador as a Protestant; in a television interview, he self-identified as Catholic. In March 2018, he declared, "When I am asked what religion I adhere to, I say that I am a Christian, in the broadest sense of the word, because Christ is love and justice is love."

López Obrador has held a variety of nicknames throughout his life, including El Molido, El Americano (The American), La Piedra (The Rock), El Comandante (The Commander), and the most popular among them is El Peje, named after the common Tabasco fish, the pejelagarto.

A baseball fan, his favorite sports team is the St. Louis Cardinals.

López Obrador was named one of Time magazine's 100 Most Influential People of 2019.

On 24 January 2021, he announced that he had tested positive for COVID-19.

== Early political career ==
=== Member of the PRI ===
He joined the PRI in 1976 to support Carlos Pellicer's campaign for a Senate seat for Tabasco. A year later, he headed the Indigenous People's Institute of Tabasco. In 1984, he relocated to Mexico City to work at the National Consumers' Institute, a federal government agency.

=== Member of the PRD ===
López Obrador resigned from his position with the government of Tabasco in 1988 to join the new dissenting left wing of the PRI, then called the Democratic Current, led by Cuauhtémoc Cárdenas. This movement formed the National Democratic Front and later became the Party of the Democratic Revolution (PRD).

In 1994, he ran for the governorship of Tabasco but lost to PRI candidate Roberto Madrazo. López Obrador gained national exposure as an advocate for the rights of indigenous people when, in 1996, he appeared on national TV drenched in blood following confrontations with police for blocking Pemex oil wells to defend the rights of local indigenous people impacted by pollution.

He was president of the PRD from 2 August 1996 to 10 April 1999.

== Head of Government of Mexico City (2000–2005) ==
=== Election ===
On 2 July 2000, he was elected Head of Government of the Federal District, a position akin to that of city mayor for the national capital district, with 38.3% of the vote.

=== Political agenda ===
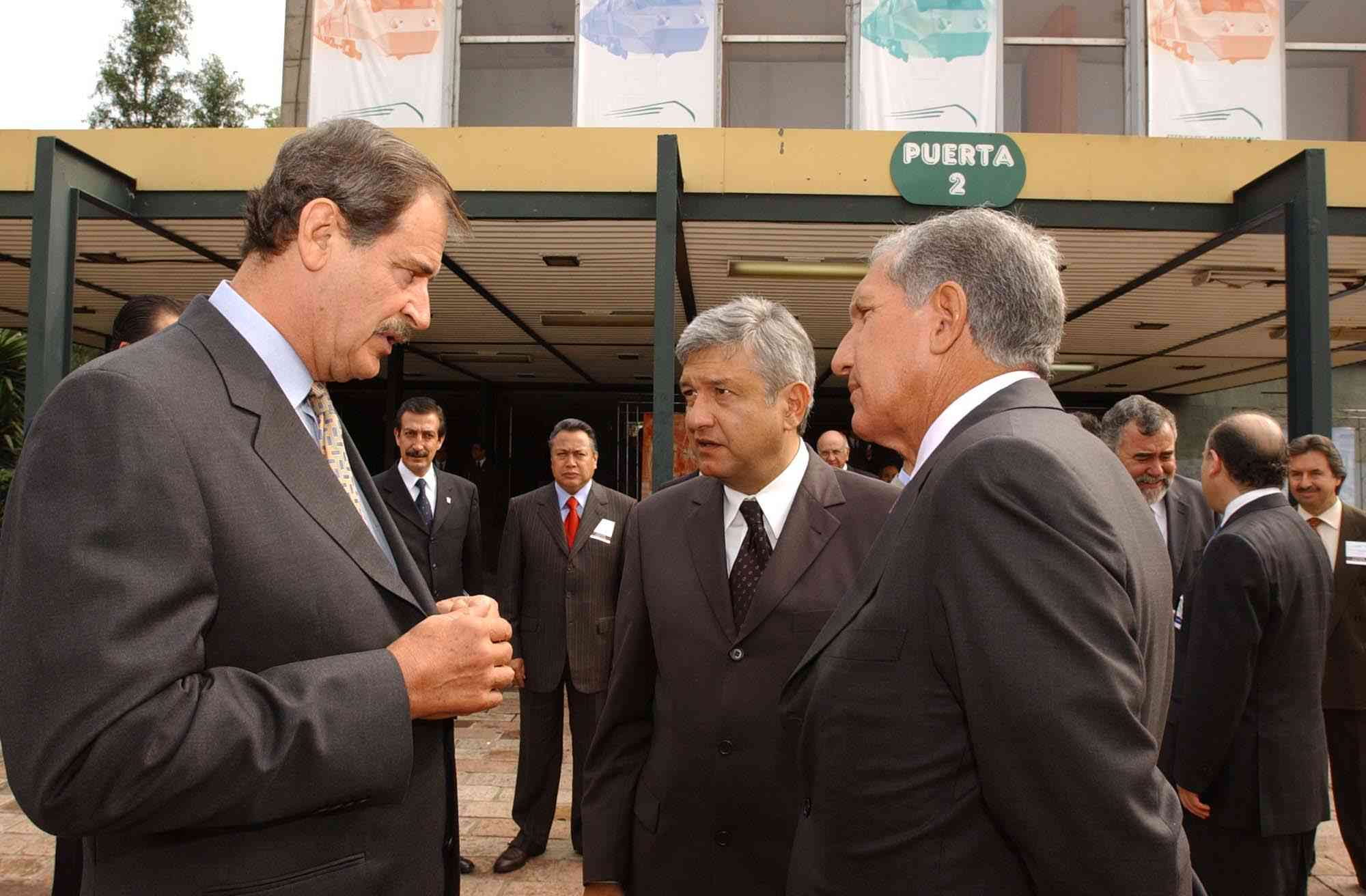
López Obrador (center) with President Vicente Fox (left) and México State governor Arturo Montiel (right) in June 2003

As mayor, López Obrador implemented various social programs that included extending financial assistance to help vulnerable groups in Mexico City, including single mothers, senior citizens, and the physically and mentally challenged. He invested in housing and schools, created old-age pensions, and expanded services. He also helped found the first new university in Mexico City in three decades, the Universidad Autónoma de la Ciudad de México.

López Obrador hired former New York City mayor Rudy Giuliani to craft a zero-tolerance policy that would help reduce crime in Mexico City.

He directed the restoration and modernization of Mexico City's historic downtown, which has 16th- and 17th-century buildings and many tourist spaces. He led a joint venture with billionaire businessman Carlos Slim Helú, a native of downtown Mexico City, to expropriate, restore, rebuild, and gentrify large parts of the area, creating shopping and residential areas for middle- and upper-income residents.

López Obrador used fiscal policy to encourage private sector investment in housing. He granted construction firms tax breaks and liberalized zoning regulations, leading to the construction of more condominiums and office buildings during his tenure than during any other period in Mexico City's history. New high-density condos emerged in the upscale neighborhoods of Polanco and Lomas de Chapultepec.

To improve traffic flow on the city's two main inner-city roads, Periférico and Viaducto, he added sections of second stories to the Anillo Periférico. He renovated about 10% of those roads. The Metrobús, an express bus service based on the Curitiba model, was built down Avenida Insurgentes, cutting through the city some 20 km from north to south.

=== Response to Tláhuac lynching ===
López Obrador's popularity diminished after the lynching of two federal law-enforcement officers performing an undercover investigation in Tláhuac in November 2004. The Mexico City Police rescued one agent, but the city's chief of police, Marcelo Ebrard, and federal Secretary of Public Safety, Ramón Martín Huerta, were both accused of not organizing a timely rescue effort. López Obrador's secretary of government, Alejandro Encinas, was criticized for declaring that the lynching should be understood as stemming from indigenous customary law (usos y costumbres). After a thorough investigation, López Obrador gave Ebrard a vote of confidence, despite a request from President Vicente Fox Quesada for him to be relieved of duty. Later, using his constitutional powers, Fox fired Ebrard. At the same time, Martín Huerta, a member of Fox's cabinet, received a reprimand and continued to hold office as Secretary of Public Safety until he died in a helicopter accident. López Obrador later appointed Ebrard as Secretary of Social Development and supported his candidacy in the PRD primaries to run for office as Head of Government of the Federal District in 2006.

=== Removal of his immunity from prosecution ===
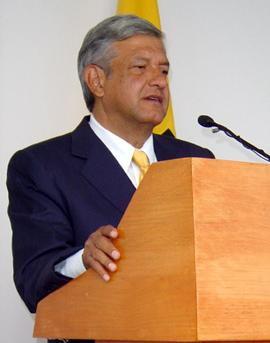
López Obrador during a speech in October 2005

Elected government officials in Mexico have an official immunity called fuero that prevents criminal charges from being brought against them, which can be removed through desafuero. In 2004, the Attorney General's Office asked Congress to strip López Obrador of his immunity under charges of a misdemeanor (ignoring a court order). The misdemeanor against López Obrador was his refusal to order the cessation of the construction of a private hospital on land expropriated by Rosario Robles (who preceded López Obrador as Head of Government of the Federal District under the Ernesto Zedillo government). Under federal law, any person with criminal charges during the electoral process would not be eligible to run in a presidential election. A legal process begun in 2004 would likely have continued during the presidential campaigns of 2006, ending López Obrador's presidential run.

Although his political opponents argued he should be subject to the same judicial process as anyone else, newspaper editorials throughout the world charged that the desafuero was politically motivated (including The New York Times and The Washington Post), that it undermined Mexican democracy, and that López Obrador's exclusion from the upcoming elections would delegitimize the eventual winner.

After Congress voted to remove López Obrador's immunity, he asked for leave from his post for a few days. President Vicente Fox, wanting to avoid a political crisis and knowing that the decision made by Congress was widely unpopular, appeared on national television in April 2005, stating that the issue would not be pursued further. The controversy closed on a technicality, and López Obrador, despite the removal of immunity, was not prosecuted and thus remained eligible to participate in the 2006 presidential election. Weeks later, Attorney General Rafael Macedo de la Concha resigned.

=== Public opinion at the end of his term ===
As Head of Government of the Federal District, López Obrador became one of the country's most recognizable politicians. He left office with an 84% approval rating, according to an opinion poll by Consulta Mitofsky. According to an article by Reforma newspaper, he kept 80% of the promises he made as a candidate.

== Presidential campaigns ==
=== 2006 presidential election ===
In September 2005, the PRD nominated López Obrador as presidential pre-candidate for the 2006 general election. Cuauhtémoc Cárdenas declined to participate in the internal elections when polls showed López Obrador as the clear favorite.

Until March 2006, polls showed him as the presidential frontrunner; however, his numbers had declined by late April. An article published by La Crónica de Hoy in March 2006 said that Mexican Bolivarian Circles and students, allegedly assisted by Venezuelan agents, distributed "Bolivarian propaganda in favor of Andrés Manuel López Obrador" throughout cities in Mexico and that such groups were given "economic support, logistics advice and ideological instruction" from the Hugo Chávez government.

Some left-wing politicians and analysts criticized López Obrador for including in his close staff many former members of the PRI who fought against his party in the 1980s and 1990s, such as Arturo Núñez (one of the authors of Fobaproa contingency fund), Manuel Camacho Solís and Marcelo Ebrard. The guerrilla leader of the Zapatista Army of National Liberation (EZLN), Subcomandante Marcos, said López Obrador was a false left-wing candidate, arguing that he was a centrist candidate. Cuauhtémoc Cárdenas did not participate in campaign events but stated that he would still vote for his party, the PRD.

López Obrador's proposals, including his 50 commitments, produced mixed opinions from analysts. The Washington Post wrote that López Obrador used U.S. President Franklin D. Roosevelt as inspiration for his proposals.

On 19 May, Roberto Madrazo, the PRI's presidential candidate, hinted at the possibility of an alliance with López Obrador to prevent National Action Party (PAN) candidate Felipe Calderón from winning the election after both parties criticized president Vicente Fox for what they saw as illegal support by the federal government for Calderón. A PRD spokesperson said both parties entered an information-sharing agreement regarding the issue. This, combined with calls from high-ranking PRI member Manuel Bartlett (former Secretary of the Interior during the 1988 presidential election fraud) to vote for López Obrador, aroused media speculation that the PRI and the PRD would ally.

On 28 May, after López Obrador discounted any such alliance because the PRI and PRD political tendencies could not be reconciled, Roberto Madrazo indicated that his comments were misunderstood and that he would not step down or endorse any other candidate.

In 2006, the Spanish newspaper El País criticized López Obrador for what it characterized as "extreme" verbal insults toward Mexican government institutions and President Vicente Fox.

==== Election results ====
According to the official count, López Obrador held an advantage over Calderón right until 97.50% of the polling stations were counted, after which Calderón overtook the first place by a difference of less than 1% of the votes

On 6 July 2006, the Federal Electoral Institute (IFE) announced the final vote count in the 2006 presidential election, resulting in a narrow margin of 0.56 percentage points (243,934 votes) of victory for his opponent, Felipe Calderón. López Obrador appealed the results, claiming widespread irregularities, and demanded an election recount. (A generalized recount is only to be carried in extreme circumstances, according to Mexican Electoral Tribunal Jurisprudence S3ELJ14-2004.) On 8 July 2006, López Obrador called for nationwide protests to ask for a national recount, stating "the government would be responsible for any flare-up of anger after officials rejected his demand for a manual recount of Sunday's extremely close vote." However, on 5 September 2006, the Federal Electoral Tribunal (TEPJF) ruled that the election was fair and that Calderón was the winner and would become president.

Summary of 2 July 2006 Mexican presidential election results
Candidates	Party	Alliance	Votes	%
Felipe Calderón	National Action Party	None	15,000,284	35.89%
Andrés Manuel López Obrador	Party of the Democratic Revolution	Coalición Por el Bien de Todos	14,756,350	35.31%
Roberto Madrazo	Institutional Revolutionary Party	Alianza Por México	9,301,441	22.26%
Patricia Mercado	Social Democratic and Peasant Alternative Party	None	1,128,850	2.70%
Roberto Campa Cifrián	New Alliance Party	None	401,804	0.96%
Write in			297,989	0.71%
Blank/Invalid			904,604	2.16%
Total			41,791,322	100.0%
Source: Instituto Federal Electoral Archived 9 January 2010 at the Wayback Machine

In contesting the election, López Obrador and his coalition made several arguments: (a) that President Fox, the Consejo Coordinador Empresarial (CCE), a business interest group, and other organizations had illegally interfered in the presidential campaign, which is strictly prohibited by electoral law, thereby providing grounds for election annulment; that (b) that votes were fraudulently tallied on 2 July and afterward; and that (c) there was widespread and significant evidence of electoral irregularities, ranging from stuffed ballot boxes and inconsistent tally reports to improper and illegal handling of the ballot trail and voter intimidation.

The Court did find that President Fox and the CCE had interfered in the elections by campaigning for Felipe Calderón, which is against electoral laws. The Court ruled that both interferences could not be considered a sufficient judicial cause to annul the election. In response to fraud allegations, the Court stated there was insufficient evidence to annul the election.

López Obrador and his coalition had alleged irregularities in many polling stations and requested a national recount. Ultimately, the TEPJF, in a unanimous vote, ordered a recount of about 9% of the polling stations. The Supreme Court later ruled that the evidence presented did not demonstrate the occurrence of sufficient irregularities to change the election outcome.

In response to this result, in a move reminiscent of Francisco I. Madero declaring himself provisional President of Mexico after calling the 1910 elections against Porfirio Díaz fraudulent, López Obrador's followers proclaimed him the Presidente Legitimo (Legitimate President), inaugurated him in a ceremony in the Zócalo and called for the creation of an alternative, parallel government.

==== Post-election protests ====
López Obrador announced his victory to his supporters on the night of the election, stating that exit polls declared he had won by 500,000 votes. He did not cite any polls at the time and later referenced Covarrubias and IMO. Several days later, the Federal Electoral Institute (IFE) published its final tally, which had him down by a margin of 0.58%, or approximately 243,000 votes. López Obrador then initiated legal actions, claiming election irregularities in 54% of polling stations, and demanded a "vote by vote" recount in all polling stations.

The Federal Electoral Tribunal (TEPJF) discussed the case and eventually dismissed it. The IFE called for the candidates to refrain from proclaiming themselves as the winner, president-elect, or president until the final resolution. Both candidates disobeyed this call. In an interview with U.S. Spanish-language TV network Univision, López Obrador referred to himself as "President of Mexico".

López Obrador held several gatherings in downtown Mexico City, with hundreds of thousands attending. On 31 July, as an act of civil disobedience, he organized a blockade of 12 kilometers of Paseo de la Reforma, one of the city's most important roads, which houses several hotels, corporate headquarters, and the Mexico City Stock Market. Business groups said the blockades cost Mexico City businesses in the area millions of pesos in losses.

On 5 August, the TEPJF met in a public session to decide the outcome of the complaints the PRD and its coalition partners had filed. The seven magistrates voted unanimously to order a recount of 11,839 ballot boxes in 155 districts (9.2% of the total) despite López Obrador's public demand for a total recount. The TEPJF based its decision for a partial recount on its finding that, despite publicly demanding a vote-by-vote general recount, López Obrador's party filed legal challenges for 71,000 polling stations (54%). Therefore, by law, the TEPJF found it could order a recount of only those 71,000 polling stations contested. The TEPJF ruled it could not order a recount of the votes not in controversy because "the certainty asked by the [López Obrador] Coalition is tied to the respect for the tallies certified by the citizens in the polling stations, not in controversy."

The TEPJF did certify that principles of certainty were grounds for a recount in some stations since there was evidence of possible irregularities. López Obrador rejected the resolution as too narrow, and he and his followers intensified their civil resistance. For about two hours on 9 August, protesters took over the tollbooths on four federal highways linking Mexico City to Cuernavaca, Querétaro, Toluca, and Pachuca. The protesters prevented personnel from charging tolls on some roads and allowed vehicles to pass freely. Also, hundreds of López Obrador supporters surrounded four of the main offices of foreign banks, including Citibank, Banamex, BBVA, and the Mexican subsidiary of HSBC, closing them for about four hours, claiming that foreign banks "ransack the country" and "widen the barrier between rich and poor" alleging banks had become involved in Mexican politics by supporting Calderón.

On 8 August, López Obrador sent a message to the press regarding the blockades, where he explained his reasons for continuing the "peaceful civil resistance". López Obrador held a rally called "National Democratic Convention" on 16 September, Independence Day, when a military parade was scheduled. The convention started after the military parade. Claiming he country's institutions to be colluded, López Obrador said that they "no longer work" and called for creating new ones.

López Obrador led a rally on the day of the State of the Union speech, where sympathizers prevented President Vicente Fox from delivering a speech inside the Legislative Palace of San Lázaro. They claimed that the President "had created a police state" in the area around Congress. They interpreted it as an unconstitutional act that made it impossible for Congress to be called into session. López Obrador told his followers not to be lured into violent confrontations with the police, declaring, "We aren't going to fall into any trap. We aren't going to be provoked." He urged his followers to remain in the Zócalo instead of marching to the Legislative Palace.

According to a poll published on 1 December 2006 in El Universal, 42% thought that Calderón's victory was fraudulent, and 46% thought it was not.

==== "Legitimate presidency" ====
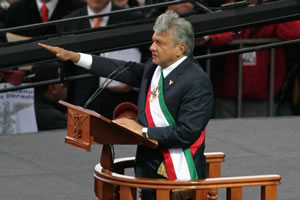
López Obrador being proclaimed "Legitimate President of Mexico" by his supporters in November 2006

On 20 November 2006, during the federal holiday commemorating the Mexican Revolution, López Obrador's sympathizers proclaimed him the "Legitimate President" at a rally in the Zócalo in Mexico City. The action was planned in another rally, the "National Democratic Convention", in which supporters gave him the title. López Obrador called for the establishment of a parallel government and shadow cabinet at the convention.

After supporters proclaimed him as the "Legitimate President of Mexico", López Obrador created a "Cabinet of Denunciation" to protest actions made by President Felipe Calderón. In his speech at the proclamation ceremony, López Obrador promised to "procure the happiness of the people" and announced twenty "actions of government", such as fostering a process for renewal of public institutions and defending the right to information and demanding openness of communication media.

Days later, López Obrador announced that he would earn a salary of 50,000 pesos (US$2,500) a month, provided by donations.

===== Reactions =====
Reactions to the "legitimate presidency" varied widely. An opinion by El País said that López Obrador's "lack of consideration for democratic institutions and the rule of law seriously endanger civil peace in Mexico." After speculation on whether or not López Obrador's self-proclamation was against the law, the PRI stated that this political action was not a crime. Liébano Sáenz, chief of staff of former President Ernesto Zedillo, said López Obrador "will become the conscience of the nation, which will do much good for Mexican democracy." José Raúl Vera López, the Roman Catholic bishop of Saltillo, Coahuila, declared that the so-called "legitimate presidency" was a result of the "profound discontent with how the country has been run" and that López Obrador had "very deep moral backing".

A poll by Grupo Reforma indicated that 56% of Mexicans disapproved of López Obrador taking the title, while only 19% approved. Sixty-three percent of those polled said the former candidate had lost credibility. Other responses in the poll included 82% describing the political atmosphere in Mexico as "tense", 45% of those polled blamed it on the PRD, 20% blamed it on the PAN, and 25% blamed both parties. The poll was a telephone survey of 850 adults on 18 November with 95% confidence interval of +/-3.4% margin of error.

In the first few months of his term, President Calderón announced initiatives that mirrored López Obrador's initiatives. These included price ceilings for tortillas through the Tortilla Price Stabilization Pact, that protected small corn producers, reductions to the president and cabinet minister salaries, and the proposal for a constitutional amendment that, if passed, would have lowered wages for public servants and impose caps on their remuneration. Some interpreted these measures as "seeking to fulfill a campaign promise to incorporate the agenda of election rival Andrés Manuel López Obrador into his government." Others saw them as intending to undercut the opposition government.

===== Occupation of Congress =====
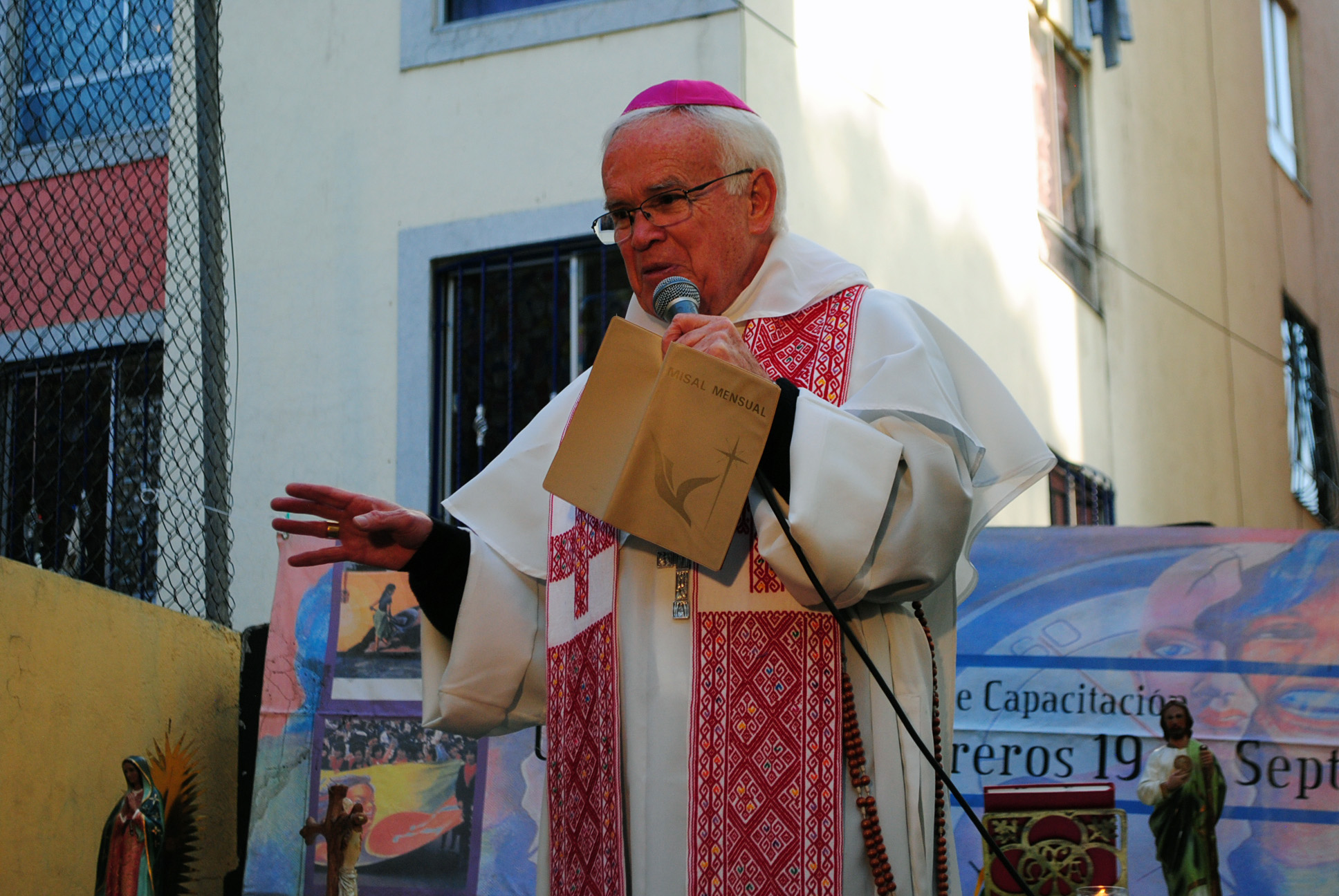
Raúl Vera López, bishop of Saltillo, declared that López Obrador's so-called "legitimate presidency" is the result of "deep discontent with the way the country has been run," and that Obrador had "very deep moral backing"

Congress was also taken by legislators of the Broad Progressive Front (FAP), the PRD, Labor, and Convergence parties on 10 April 2008 because they disagreed with the Government regarding energy policy discussions, claiming they were unconstitutional. López Obrador's followers, using chairs and tables and barricades, took both chambers of Congress and had them chained, thus avoiding the passage of secondary laws which modified the legal framework of the Mexican state-owned oil company, Pemex. López Obrador and his followers opposed these laws and viewed them as leading to the de facto privatization of the company. López Obrador requested a four-month debate on energy policies instead of the 50-day one presented by the PAN, PRI, Green Party and New Alliance.

=== 2012 presidential election ===
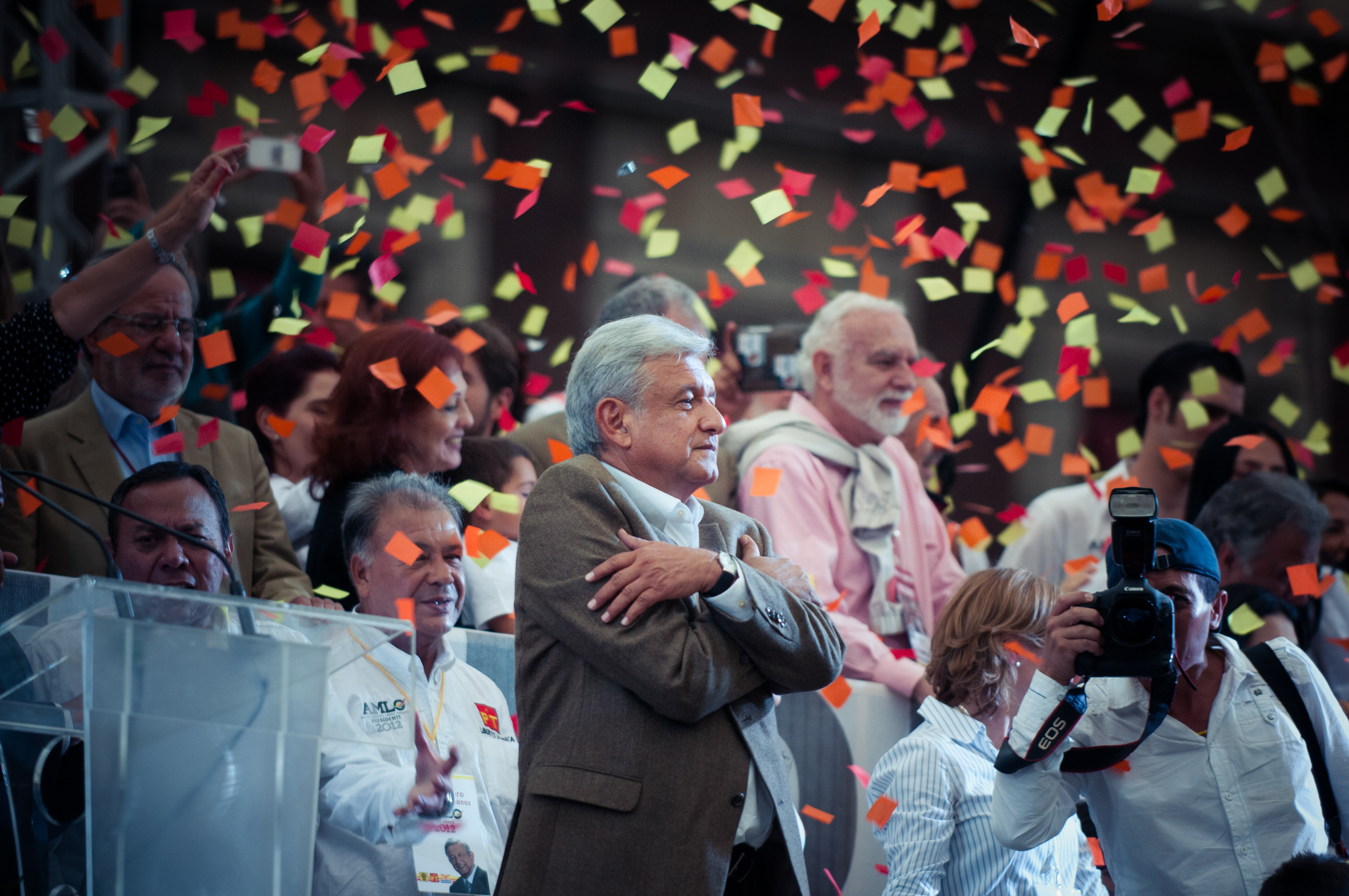
López Obrador at Zócalo in 2012

López Obrador ran again as the PRD, Labor Party, and Citizens' Movement candidate under the coalition Movimiento Progresista in the 2012 presidential election.

==== Political proposals ====
===== Economic proposals =====
In November 2011, López Obrador announced some of his economic proposals:

- Job creation: A sustained 6% growth rate to generate the new 1.2 million jobs needed each year.
- Austerity: Reducing salaries of government officials and unnecessary spending, saving around US$30 billion a year.
- Progressive fiscal reforms: López Obrador said the people who make less should pay a smaller percentage of taxes than those who make more money.
- No new taxes or increases on existing taxes: López Obrador plans to focus on ending fiscal privileges.
- Competition: End monopolies; any private citizen who wants to participate in media, television, and telephony should be able to.

===== Security policy =====
López Obrador had been a firm critic of Felipe Calderón's crime strategy and promised to reduce military presence on the streets, offering reparations to victims of the Mexican drug war and emphasizing the protection of human rights in the country. López Obrador proposed a single police command that would gradually assume the activities of the Mexican Navy and the Mexican Army, as well as a single intelligence agency to tackle the financial networks of criminal organizations. The new police force would promote "civic and moral values". He promised to increase the salaries and benefits given to law enforcement officials throughout Mexico. His security strategy comprised ten proposals, but all of them had the main theme: organized crime cannot be tackled if the government is responsible for the erosion of human rights.

He also stated that if elected, he would reject any intelligence activity from the United States, including money and weapons in aid. This policy would stop the operations in Mexico of the Central Intelligence Agency and the Drug Enforcement Administration, including the use of drones. But it could also discourage U.S. aid to Mexico (US$1.6 billion since 2008). The proposal intended to appeal to discontent over U.S. actions in "Operation Fast and Furious", where ATF agents were involved in a gun-walking scandal.

López Obrador promised to reactivate the economy and social growth, so more people could have access to a "better life" without joining cartels and abandoning the rule of law. He also pledged to improve the education system and create more jobs before the criminal groups can recruit them. He also spoke of taming corruption, impunity, drug consumption, addiction, and elite privileges. The security Cabinet he proposed would work directly with the municipal and state forces in a unified command.

López Obrador summed up his security policy as "Abrazos, no balazos" (Hugs, not bullets). At the start of his campaign, he said he would remove Mexican Army personnel from the streets. Still, in May 2012, it stated that the military would continue to operate until Mexico had a "trained, skilled and moralized police force."

==== Proposed cabinet ====
López Obrador announced a tentative cabinet. Among them were:

- Marcelo Ebrard as Secretary of the Interior
- Rogelio Ramírez de la O as Secretary of the Treasury
- Juan Ramón de la Fuente as Secretary of Education
- Claudia Sheinbaum Pardo as Secretary of the Environment
- Javier Jiménez Espriú as Secretary of Communications and Transportation
- Fernando Turner as Secretary of Economic Development
- Adolfo Hellmund López as Secretary of Energy
- René Drucker Colín as Secretary of Science and Technology
- Elena Poniatowska as Secretary of Culture
- Héctor Vasconcelos as Secretary of Foreign Affairs

==== Election results ====
The election was won by Enrique Peña Nieto of the PRI, with 38.2%, to 31.6% for López Obrador. López Obrador did not accept the preliminary results, as most votes had not been counted. Subsequently, he claimed vote buying and other irregularities and demanded a full recount by the Federal Electoral Institute (IFE). The IFE found irregularities but confirmed the results on 6 July. López Obrador rejected this announcement and filed a complaint to invalidate the election. He alleged vote-buying, spending above election regulations, illegal fundraising, and vote fraud. On 30 August, the Electoral Tribunal of the Federal Judiciary formally rejected his complaint.

Candidate	Party	Alliance	Votes	%
Enrique Peña Nieto	Institutional Revolutionary Party	Compromiso por México	18,727,398	38.15
Andrés Manuel López Obrador	Party of the Democratic Revolution	Movimiento Progresista	15,535,117	31.64
Josefina Vázquez Mota	National Action Party	None	12,473,106	25.40
Gabriel Quadri de la Torre	New Alliance Party	None	1,129,108	2.36
Non-registered candidates			31,660	0.07
Invalid/blank votes			1,191,057	2.46
Total			49,087,446	100
Registered voters/turnout			77,738,494	63.10
Source: PREP (98.95% of polling stations reporting)

Popular Vote
Peña Nieto	38.20%
López Obrador	31.60%
Vázquez Mota	25.39%
Quadri de la Torre	2.28%
Other	0.04%
Invalid/blank	2.46%

==== Peña Nieto vote-buying controversy ====
At a news conference, López Obrador claimed that the election was "plagued with irregularities" and accused the PRI of vote buying. He also claimed that the PRI handed out gifts to lure voters into casting their vote for that party with the cooperation of Soriana, a retail chain. On the day of the 2012 presidential elections, people who voted for the PRI would receive pre-paid gift cards. Nonetheless, the PRI and the store denied those accusations and threatened to sue López Obrador. Peña Nieto vowed to imprison anyone – including members of the PRI – if they were found guilty of electoral fraud. Despite Peña Nieto's statement, videos by citizens about the Soriana cards surfaced on the internet.

=== Creation of Morena (2012–2014) ===
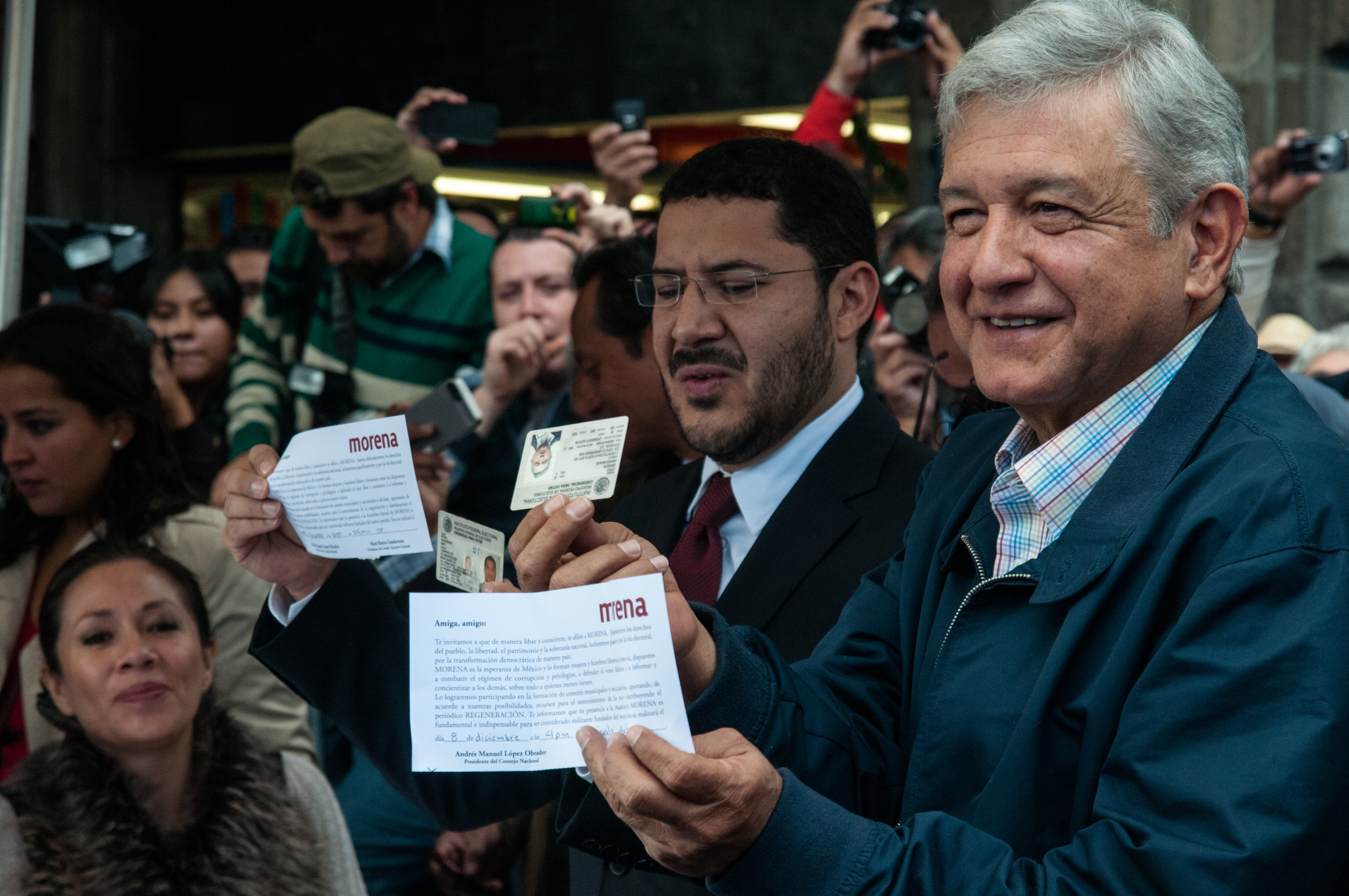
López Obrador (right) holding his Voter ID upside down along with Martí Batres (center) after submitting the formal political registration of Morena to the INE

Following the 2012 presidential election loss, López Obrador told a rally in Mexico City's Zócalo on 9 September 2012 that he would withdraw from the Democratic Revolution Party "on the best of terms". He said he was working on founding a new party from the National Regeneration Movement ("Movimiento de Regeneración Nacional" in Spanish), or Morena, for its acronym in Spanish. A couple of days after his departure from the PRD, federal deputy Ricardo Monreal stated it was a "divorce for convenience", and that López Obrador did the most responsible thing to avoid polarization of the country. According to polls and surveys, in 2012 most of the Mexican public had a negative view of the establishment of Morena as a political party. On 7 January 2014, Martí Batres, president of Morena, presented the documentation to the INE to be acknowledged political party.

In 2014, López Obrador revealed why he left the PRD, stating, "I left the PRD because the leaders of that party betrayed the people, they went with Peña Nieto and approved the Pact for Mexico, which is nothing more than a Pact against Mexico. I can not be in a party where tax increases were approved, and it was approved that they would increase the price of gasoline every month. Gasoline in Mexico costs more than in the United States, the salary in Mexico is the lowest in the entire North American continent, and instead of asking for wage increases, the PRD rose to the podium to ask for an increase in the price of gasoline, it's an embarrassment." After Cuauhtémoc Cárdenas criticized him for forming his political party, on 7 July 2014, López Obrador posted on social media that, "PRD leaders and most of its legislators voted for the fiscal reforms [raising taxes and gas prices] and with their collaboration they paved the way for privatization of the oil industry." On 10 July 2014, the INE approved Morena as an official political party to receive federal funds and participate in the 2015 legislative elections.

=== 2018 presidential election ===
López Obrador participated again in the 2018 presidential election, his third presidential run. In the election, he represented Morena, the left-wing Labor Party (PT), and the socially conservative right-wing Social Encounter Party (PES) under the coalition Juntos Haremos Historia. Pre-election polls indicated he had a double-digit lead over candidates Ricardo Anaya, José Antonio Meade, and Jaime Rodríguez Calderón.

In 2018, the Mexican publication Aristegui Noticias criticized Vicente Fox for what it characterized as "extreme" verbal insults on Twitter towards López Obrador's crackdown on institutional corruption.

==== Juntos Haremos Historia ====
===== Background =====
On 24 June 2017, the PT agreed to fight the 2018 election in an electoral alliance with Morena; however, the coalition had not officially registered with the National Electoral Institute (INE), the country's electoral authority. For Morena, the alliance consolidated after the withdrawal of the PT's candidate Óscar González Yáñez, who resigned his candidacy and called for votes in favor of Delfina Gómez Álvarez, the standard-bearer in the state elections of the State of Mexico in 2017.

In October 2017, at PT's National Congress, as party president Alberto Anaya was reelected to another 6-year term, PT formalized its coalition with Morena.

At first, there was speculation about the possibility of a front grouping all the left-wing parties: Morena, the PRD, PT, and the MC. However, López Obrador rejected any agreement due to political differences, especially after the 2017 State of Mexico elections, where the candidates of the PRD and MC continued with their campaigns and refused to support the Morena candidate. At the end of November 2017, the leaders of Morena and the PES announced that they were in talks to form a possible alliance: Hugo Eric Flores Cervantes, president of the PES, said: "We don't negotiate with the PRI, we have two options, go alone or with Morena."

===== Confirmation =====
Parties of the coalition Juntos Haremos Historia

On 13 December 2017, PES joined the coalition between Morena and the PT, and it was formalized under the name Juntos Haremos Historia (Together We Will Make History). Following the signing of the agreement, López Obrador was appointed as a pre-candidate for the three political groups. It was a partial coalition that supported López Obrador as the presidential candidate and divided the legislative elections between the three: Morena chose candidates in 150 federal electoral districts (out of 300) and 32 Senate rates, while the PT and the PES each nominated 75 candidates for the Chamber of Deputies and 16 for the Senate.

The alliance received criticism as it was a coalition between two left-wing parties (Mrena and the PT) with a formation related to the evangelical right (PES). In response, Morena national president Yeidckol Polevnsky said that her party "believes in inclusion and teamwork to rescue Mexico" and that they will continue to defend human rights; in turn, Hugo Eric Flores Cervantes, national president of the PES, said that "the only possibility of real change in our country is the one headed by Andrés Manuel López Obrador" and that his party had decided to be "on the right side of history".

Andrés Manuel López Obrador said this would be his last attempt to become president, rejecting the idea of becoming a permanent moral leader for the Mexican left-wing.

==== International solidarity ====
In Paris, France, there is the "Official French Committee of Morena", on which several occasions have presented their support to the candidate in small rallies in that European country. In February 2018, French deputy and former presidential candidate Jean-Luc Mélenchon, founder of the La France Insoumise party, met with López Obrador, before the official start of the electoral campaign in Mexico, and described his possible victory in the following terms: "If they manage to thwart the plans against them and win the elections, it will be a great change for Mexico and all of Latin America."

Miguel Ángel Revilla, president of the Autonomous Community of Cantabria, Spain, mentioned López Obrador in an interview on the El Hormiguero program, where he spoke of the possibility of victory for the presidential candidate in 2018: "I think he's going to win because Mexico needs a change to a good person because they are presenting him as a Chávez-type populist, or Fidel Castro-type, but really, because he wants to end corruption and inequality within [the limits of] what he can do because the country does not deserve what it has until now; I want to send my support to this man, Andrés Manuel López Obrador, from here."

López Obrador has been referred to as the "ideological twin" of the US's progressive leader Bernie Sanders and the UK's Labour Party leader, Jeremy Corbyn, the latter having visited López Obrador and invited him over to the British Parliament.

==== Proposed Cabinet ====
In December 2017, López Obrador presented his proposed cabinet:

- Olga Sánchez Cordero as Secretary of the Interior
- Héctor Vasconcelos as Secretary of Foreign Affairs
- Carlos Manuel Urzúa Macías as Secretary of Finance
- Maria Luisa Albores as Secretary of Social Development
- Josefa González Blanco Ortiz Mena as Secretary of Environment
- Rocío Nahle García as Secretary of Energy
- Graciela Márquez Colín as Secretary of Economy
- Esteban Moctezuma Barragán as Secretary of Education
- Víctor Villalobos as Secretary of Agriculture
- Javier Jiménez Espriú as Secretary of Communications
- Irma Eréndira Sandoval as Secretary of the Civil Service
- Jorge Alcocer Varela as Secretary of Health
- Luisa María Alcalde Luján as Secretary of Labor
- Román Meyer Falcón as Secretary of Agrarian Development and Urban Planning
- Miguel Torruco Marqués as Secretary of Tourism
- Alejandra Frausto Guerrero as Secretary of Culture

Replacements

- It was announced on 5 July 2018 that Héctor Vasconcelos would be replaced at Foreign Affairs by Marcelo Ebrard, following Vasconcelos's election to the Senate.
- Arturo Herrera replaced Carlos Manuel Urzúa Macías at Finance on 10 July 2019.
- Víctor Manuel Toledo replaced Josefa González Blanco Ortíz Mena as Minister of Environment and Natural Resources on 25 May 2019.

==== Political positions during campaign ====
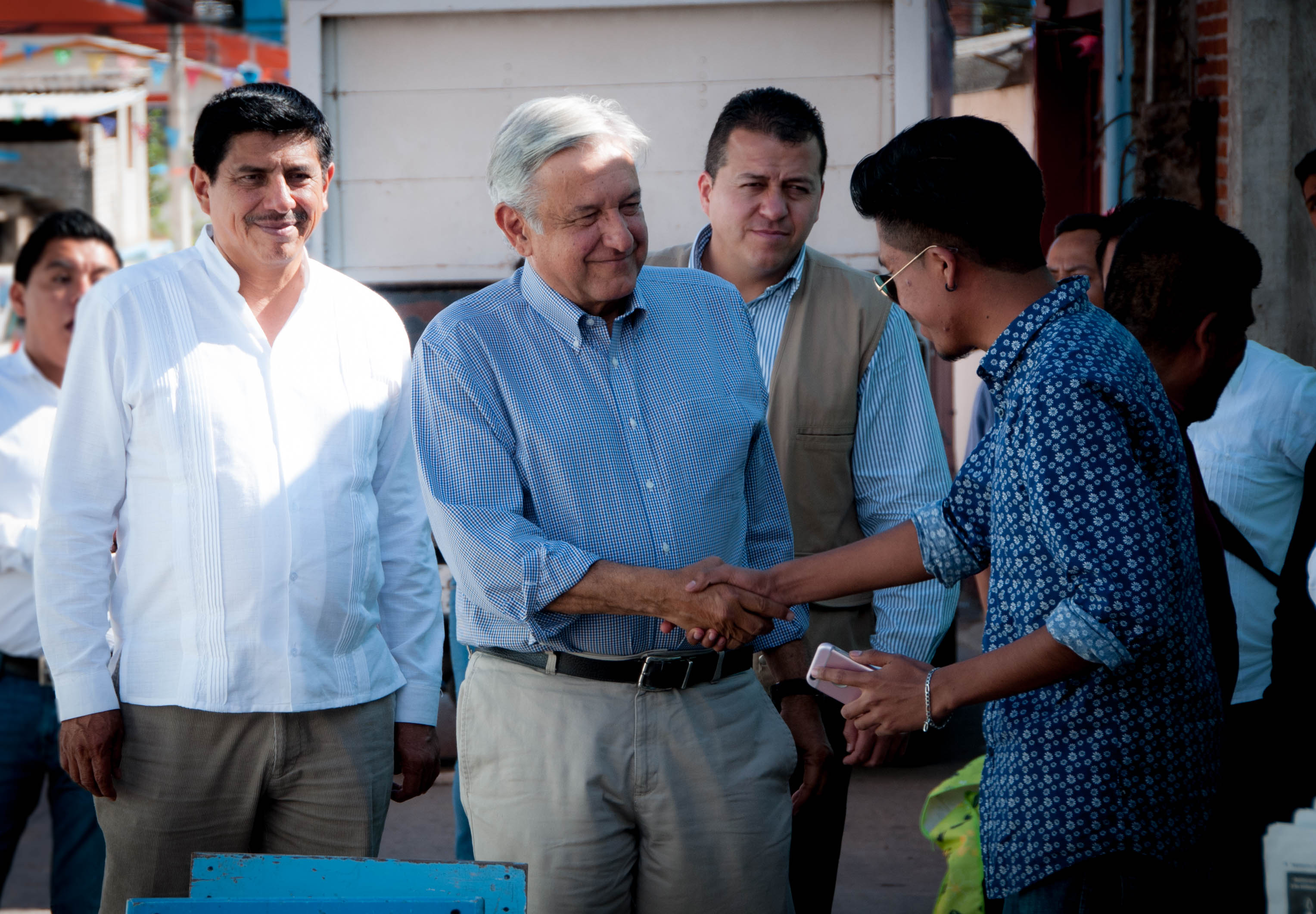
Salomón Jara Cruz (left) and López Obrador (center) in San Baltazar Chichicapam, Oaxaca, in March 2016

López Obrador has been described as left-wing and populist. Other outlets have claimed that López Obrador toned down his rhetoric for the 2018 election, allying with business figures and narrowing his criticism of the North American Free Trade Agreement (NAFTA). In his inauguration speech, he inveighed against neoliberalism, calling it a "disaster" and a "calamity" for the country, and promised "a fourth transformation", in reference to three major events in Mexican history, the Mexican War of Independence (1810–1821), the Reform War (1858–1861) and the Mexican Revolution (1910–1920).

He proposed the cancellation of the under-construction New Mexico City International Airport, the conversion of the president's official residence and office complex, Los Pinos, into a cultural center, as well as universal health care, free internet, and a sale of the presidential aircraft. López Obrador has offered to hold referendums on various issues, among them a performance evaluation halfway through his term during the 2021 legislative elections (instead of his former proposal of every two years)) that would cut his six-year term short if he lost the consultation. He proposed dispersing the cabinet throughout the country's states, with the objective of "promoting development throughout the national territory," while the Presidency and the Ministries of National Defense, the Navy, the Interior, Foreign Affairs, and Finance and Public Credit would remain in the capital.

New Airport for Mexico City

Corruption, geological, and environmental problems related to the construction of a new airport in Texcoco, State of Mexico, were major issues during López Obrador's 2018 presidential campaign. After winning the election but before taking office, he sponsored a citizen referendum on replacing the Texcoco airport with rebuilding the military airport Santa Lucia in Zumpango, State of Mexico. The referendum passed with 70% of the 1 million votes cast. Canceling the airport cost MXN 75 billion (US$3.98 billion). The new airport in Zumpango was named "Felipe Ángeles International Airport", and construction began on 17 October 2019. The airport opened in March 2022.

===== Anti-corruption =====
López Obrador's chief pledge was to eradicate institutional corruption by enacting constitutional laws and policies to make corruption more difficult. One example is two laws enacted that make corruption and voter fraud a criminal act without bail, as well as removing corrupt government officials with due process. López Obrador pledged a combination of zero tolerance and personal honesty to sweep it out "from top to bottom like cleaning the stairs." He asked international organizations to come to Mexico to help investigate cases of corruption and human rights abuses. He announced a willingness to allow the creation of a body akin to the International Commission against Impunity in Guatemala to help local prosecutors build graft cases. He also proposed to amend an article in the constitution to make it possible to try presidents for corruption.

===== Energy =====
López Obrador has had mixed views on the privatization of oil that was signed into law in 2013. He has called for a referendum over the 2013 energy reform that ended Pemex's monopoly in the oil industry. Rocío Nahle García, his top energy adviser, has called for a freeze on future deepwater drilling auctions and a review of contracts with international oil companies. In February 2018, his business adviser, Alfonso Romo, said, "[he] reviewed most of the oil tenders awarded to private drillers and found them to be beneficial for Mexico." He has also pledged to end oil exports to focus internally, as well as invest in refineries along with ending the importation of gasoline from the United States, saying the nation must recover energy self-sufficiency "as a principle of national security" and should make loss-making state refineries operable and assess biodiesel production. López Obrador has promised no more gasolinazos as well as no more hikes in electricity and gas prices. On 30 November 2018, López Obrador told the press that the previous administration's oil reforms, which permitted auctioning oil field rights to private companies, would not continue under his administration.

Shortly after taking office, López Obrador cracked down on the robbery of motor fuels: Huachicolero. Despite the 18 January 2019 Tlahuelilpan pipeline explosion that cost the lives of at least 119 in Tlahuelilpan, Hidalgo, and local fuel shortages, gasoline theft was cut by 95% from 81,000 barrels in November 2018 to 4,000 barrels in April 2019 with a savings of 11 billion pesos ($581 million).

By 2023 Mexico plans to have seven oil refineries, including a new one that is being built at the Dos Bocas port in Paraíso, Tabasco. Construction on the Dos Bocas refinery began in August 2019, with an estimated cost between US$6 billion and $8 billion.

===== Education =====
With his saying, "Becarios sí, sicarios, no" (Scholarship recipients, yes; hitmen, no), López Obrador promised guaranteed schooling and employment to all young Mexicans, through universal access to public colleges, and proposed monthly scholarships of 2,400 MXN to low-income university students. López Obrador is against the educational reform passed into law in 2013, stating he opposes the use of standardized test scores as a basis for firing teachers, saying, "It is an ideological problem of the right, of conservatism; deep down they do not want public education, they want education to be privatized, that is the mentality that prevails in these people. I ask them to be serene and if you really want to help improve education, do not polarize or disqualify [the teachers]." He also argued that: "children go to school without eating and that is not addressed in the so-called education reform."

The educational reform laws passed during the Peña Nieto administration were overturned in September 2019. The new laws promise to assess teachers' opinions and preserve the public nature of the school system.

===== Drug War =====
As the Mexican drug war that started under President Calderón (2006–12) dragged on into its 12th year, he reiterated his 2012 presidential run strategy of "Abrazos, no balazos" (Hugs, not bullets), arguing that jobs and better wages, especially for younger people and the rural populace, are necessary to combat crime, not the use of more military force. He has proposed amnesty for some drug war criminals, for which he would seek the aid of international NGOs, Pope Francis, and UN Secretary-General António Guterres. Héctor Vasconcelos, a former diplomat, said a López Obrador government would gradually pull back the Army and Navy from the streets where they have been engaged. López Obrador is willing to establish a truth commission to bring closure to tens of thousands of people exposed to murders and disappearances of their friends and families, such as the 2014 Ayotzinapa kidnapping. He declared that he would consider legalizing certain drugs as part of a broader strategy to fight poverty and crime.

López Obrador declared an end to the Drug War, announcing that he wished to shift from capturing capos (drug lords) to reducing violence and paying more attention to health and socioeconomic concerns. Nonetheless, the murder rate increased during his first year in office. López Obrador has sent the newly formed, militarized National Guard to fight crime, but they have not been any more successful than previous police and military efforts. A major setback was a failed attempt to arrest Ovidio Guzmán López in October 2019, which set off fierce gun battles in Culiacán, Sinaloa, and had to be called off. López Obrador later explained that his primary concern was saving lives. When three adults and six children, American citizens belonging to the LeBaron family, were killed near the border between Sinaloa and Chihuahua, President Donald Trump briefly threatened to declare the cartels terrorist organizations. López Obrador persuaded him not to do so.

===== Economic policy =====
Lopez Obrador describes himself as an adherent of a mixed economy. At an event on 3 June 2018, he explained that "there will be a mixed economy; the State with public investment could not face the challenge of growth in Mexico, private investment is required, and the social sector is also required." Based on his economic proposals, he wants the country to be "self-sufficient" and to "rescue the agriculture industry" affected by the North American Free Trade Agreement. He has also doubled compensations to both, pensions to two million five hundred senior citizens, and the nation's minimum wage. López Obrador has also created a special zone along Mexico's northern border with lower value-added taxes, lower rent taxes, and a higher minimum wage. His advisers also said that the same measures could also be directed at Mexico's southern border and elsewhere to contain migration. He has planned a host of infrastructure projects in partnership with the private sector, including rail links in the forests of Yucatán and across the Isthmus of Tehuantepec, to spark economic growth in Mexico's economically depressed south. At a major banking conference in March 2018, he made promises to maintain economic stability and respect the autonomy of the Bank of Mexico, saying: "We will support banks and we won't confiscate assets. There won't be expropriations or nationalizations."

===== NAFTA/USMCA =====
López Obrador has criticized NAFTA, arguing small Mexican corn farmers have been affected, as well as proposing to defend avocado farmers from agricultural tariffs. He has asked Peña Nieto's administration to postpone the current renegotiation of the agreement, arguing both Donald Trump and Peña Nieto do not have a strong, amicable relationship, tainted by a cancelled foreign trip. During the general assembly of the American Chamber of Commerce in Mexico, he said he does not want the agreement cancelled, arguing it benefits the three member nations. In June 2018, during a presidential debate, he argued that if there is a failure in the NAFTA renegotiation, the domestic economy must be strengthened, saying, "[it] cannot be fatal for Mexicans, our country has a lot of natural resources, a lot of wealth." López Obrador has argued in favor of increasing workers' salaries "because wages in our country are very low; they are the lowest wages in the world and we need to strengthen the domestic market and improve the income of workers; you can not be paying the workers of the maquilas 800 pesos a week."

Mexico and the United States reached a new trade agreement on 27 August 2018, and Canada agreed on 30 September. The new trade agreement is called the United States–Mexico–Canada Agreement (USMCA). The USMCA increases environmental and labor regulations, and incentivizes the domestic production of cars and trucks. The agreement also provides updated intellectual property protections. Then-U.S. Trade Representative Robert Lighthizer, Canadian Deputy Prime Minister Chrystia Freeland, and Deputy Minister for North America Jesús Seade Kuri signed a modified agreement in Mexico City on 10 December 2018. The Mexican Senate ratified the treaty on 19 June 2019, the US on January 29, 2020 (Public Law No: 116–113), and Canada on March 13, 2020.

===== Fiscal policy =====
Arguing he would be fiscally conservative, López Obrador proposed raising social spending without tax hikes or accumulation of public debt, via proposed austerity measures on politician and bureaucrat salaries and subsidies, including the president's salary and post-presidential pension, as well as fighting private corruption and tax fraud.

López Obrador has reduced the presidential salary by 60% to MXN 108,000 (US$5,000) per month and has limited what public servants and judiciary members can earn. He opened the presidential housing complex of Los Pinos to the public, taking up residence in the National Palace. On top of this, he has sold off government assets, including vehicles and real estate; proceeds have gone to social programs for the poor. An austerity law passed in October 2019 restricts remodeling of government offices, bans government employees for ten years from working in private companies they regulated while in office, and cuts presidential pensions. The president flies commercial airlines, but has not yet found a buyer for the presidential airplane.

===== Foreign policy =====
Following accusations by interest groups and the opposition, which have alleged influences by the Venezuelan government and drawn comparisons with Donald Trump, López Obrador stated, "No to Chavismo, no to Trumpismo; yes to Juarismo, yes to Maderismo, yes to Cardenismo, yes to Mexicanismo." He has repeatedly stated that he wants to continue the bilateral relationship with the United States based on mutual respect and friendship, "and not of subordination", insisting that "Mexico will not be a piñata of any foreign government". He has also said, "we no longer want Mexico to be seen as a country of conquest, the looting is over." During a presidential debate, López Obrador argued that "the best foreign policy is domestic policy", in that if the country has no corruption and crime, it will help develop trust for investment and tourism because the image of Mexico would improve the perception of Mexico in the international arena. He has campaigned on Mexico's former foreign policy of non-interventionism and the Principle of the self-determination of the peoples' nations, the Estrada Doctrine, stated in the Mexican constitution, article 89. López Obrador reiterated his commitment to non-interventionism with the statement he made during his presidential victory speech, "We will be friends of all the world's people and governments. The principles of non-intervention, self-determination, and the peaceful settlement of disputes will be applied again."

After the 2019 election victory in Argentina, López Obrador developed a close relationship with President Alberto Fernández in what El País described as a "progressive alliance", with Fernández making one of his first official trips abroad to Mexico (the first being to Israel). The two countries later developed a closer bond in cooperation regarding the COVID-19 vaccine. López Obrador also expressed support for Argentina's claim to the Falkland Islands and has urged the United Kingdom to negotiate an end to the dispute with Argentina.

===== Immigration and U.S. policy =====
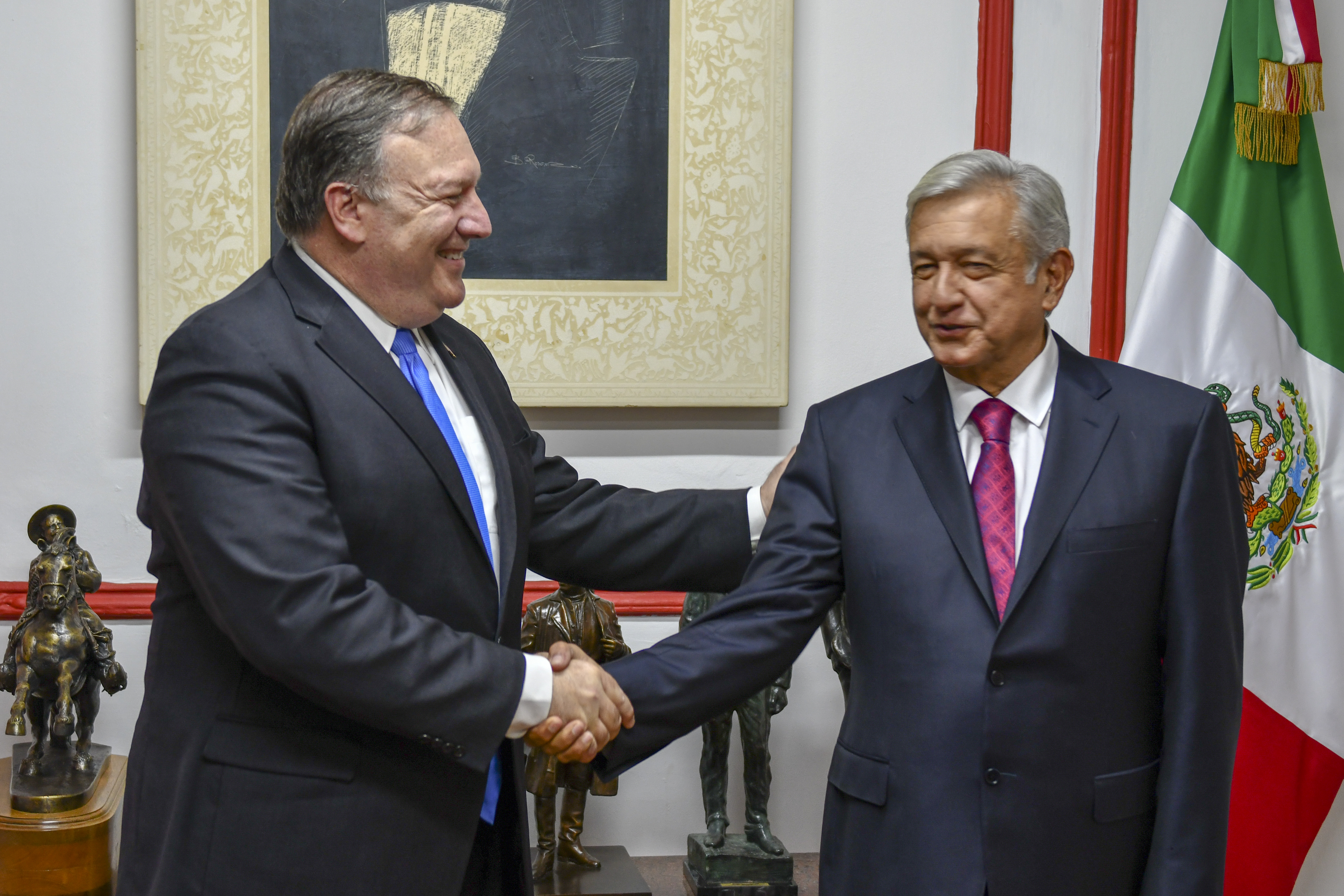
López Obrador with US Secretary of State Mike Pompeo in July 2018

As President Donald Trump falsely accused Mexican illegal immigrants of "bringing drugs [and] crime" during his presidential campaign, López Obrador took a stance against Trump's proposals for a wall on the U.S.-Mexico border as well as the deportation of undocumented immigrants in the United States. In 2017, he called on the Peña Nieto administration to "[present] a lawsuit at the United Nations against the U.S. government for violation of human rights and racial discrimination". He promised to convert the 50 Mexican consulates in the United States into "procurators" for the defense of migrants, suggested appointing Alicia Bárcena, current Executive Secretary of the United Nations Economic Commission for Latin America and the Caribbean, as Mexico's permanent representative to the UN, and pledged to put pressure on the United States through organizations like the United Nations. He accused the establishment parties of the corruption that keeps migrants from receiving the support they need.

Regarding migration to Mexico, he asserted his government would not "continue the dirty work" of the United States and detain Central American migrants at the country's southern border. Following his proposed idea of decentralizing the nation's cabinet away from Mexico City, he would move the National Institute of Migration to Tijuana, Baja California. He suggested that the NAFTA renegotiations should create a development plan for Central America as a means to address emigration in the region, including a proposed "alliance for progress" including Mexico, the United States, Canada, and Central America to foster job creation, grow the economy and pacify the region. López Obrador said he wants to broker a deal with President Trump to stem illegal immigration through jobs and development rather than a border wall.

López Obrador's pick for the proposed re-establishment of the Secretariat of Public Security, Alfonso Durazo, declared in July 2018 that there are plans to create a border police that would mainly patrol Mexico's southern border to halt illegal immigration, drugs, and weapons. In October 2018, López Obrador declared working visas for Central American immigrants. Days later, following the arrival of Central American migrant caravans into Mexico en route to the United States, he asked for solidarity with the migrants.

==== Election results ====
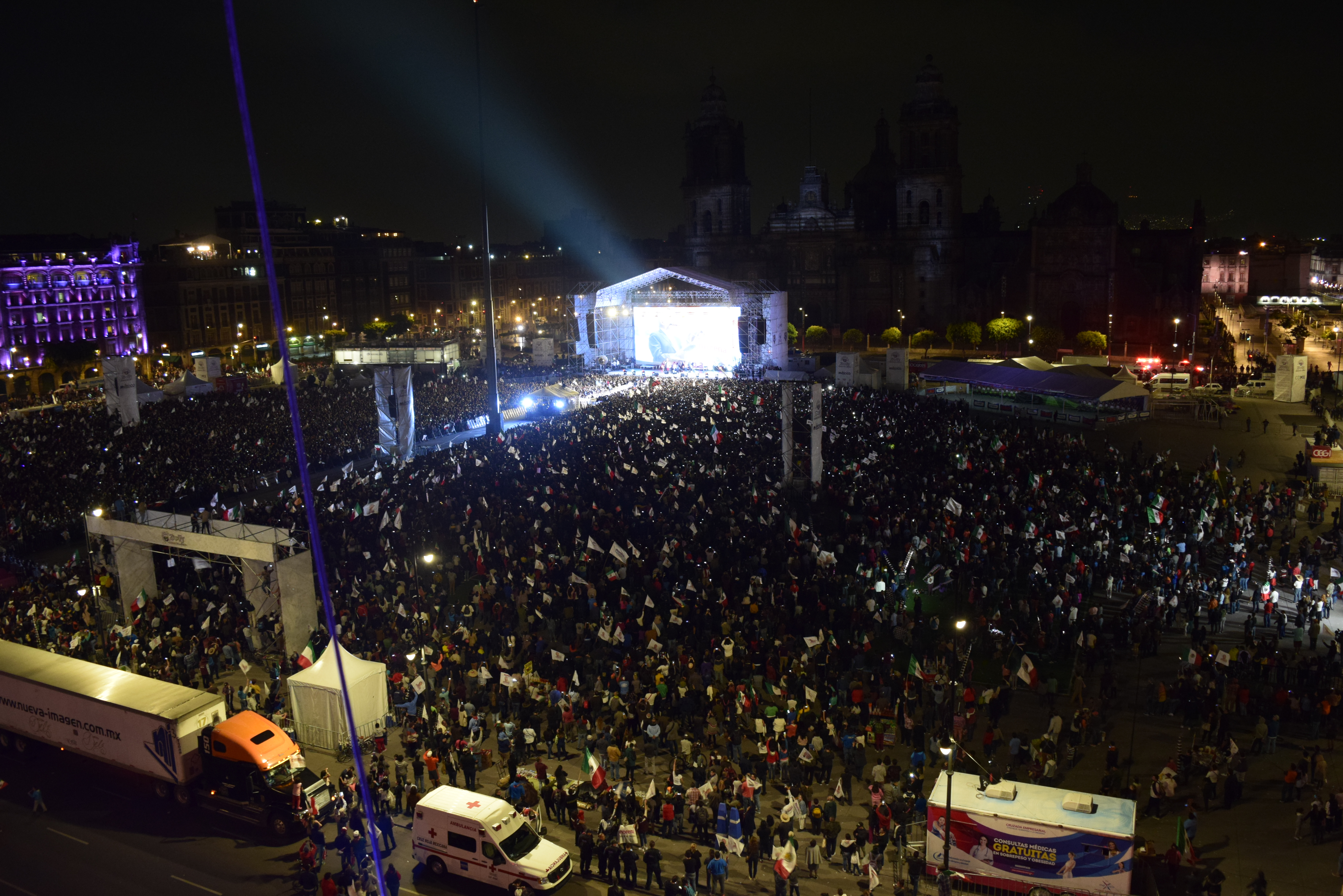
Celebration of Andrés Manuel López Obrador in Mexico City's Zocalo after being declared winner in Mexico's federal elections of 1 July 2018

López Obrador won the election on 1 July 2018 with 53% of the popular vote–the first candidate to win an outright majority since 1988, and the first candidate not from the PRI or its predecessors to do so since the Mexican Revolution.

In terms of states won, López Obrador won in a landslide, carrying 31 out of 32 of the country's states.

Around 30 minutes after polls closed in the country's northwest, José Antonio Meade, speaking at a news conference from PRI headquarters, conceded defeat and wished Andrés Manuel López Obrador "every success". Ricardo Anaya also conceded defeat within an hour of the polls closing, and independent candidate Jaime Rodríguez Calderón recognized López Obrador's victory shortly afterward.

Candidate	Party	Alliance	Votes	%
Andrés Manuel López Obrador	National Regeneration Movement	Juntos Haremos Historia	30,112,109	53.19
Ricardo Anaya	National Action Party	Por México al Frente	12,609,472	22.28
José Antonio Meade	Institutional Revolutionary Party	Todos por México	9,289,378	16.41
Jaime Rodríguez Calderón	Independent	None	2,961,539	5.23
Margarita Zavala (Note: Dropped out of the race, but votes towards her will be counted)	Independent	None	32,743	0.06
Write-in votes			31,981	0.06
Invalid/blank votes			1,570,828	2.77
Total			56,608,050	100
Registered voters/turnout			89,994,039	63.43
Source: INE

Popular Vote
López Obrador	53.19%
Anaya	22.28%
Meade	16.41%
Rodríguez Calderón	5.23%
Zavala	0.06%
Other	0.06%
Invalid/blank	2.77%

==== Presidential transition (July–December 2018) ====
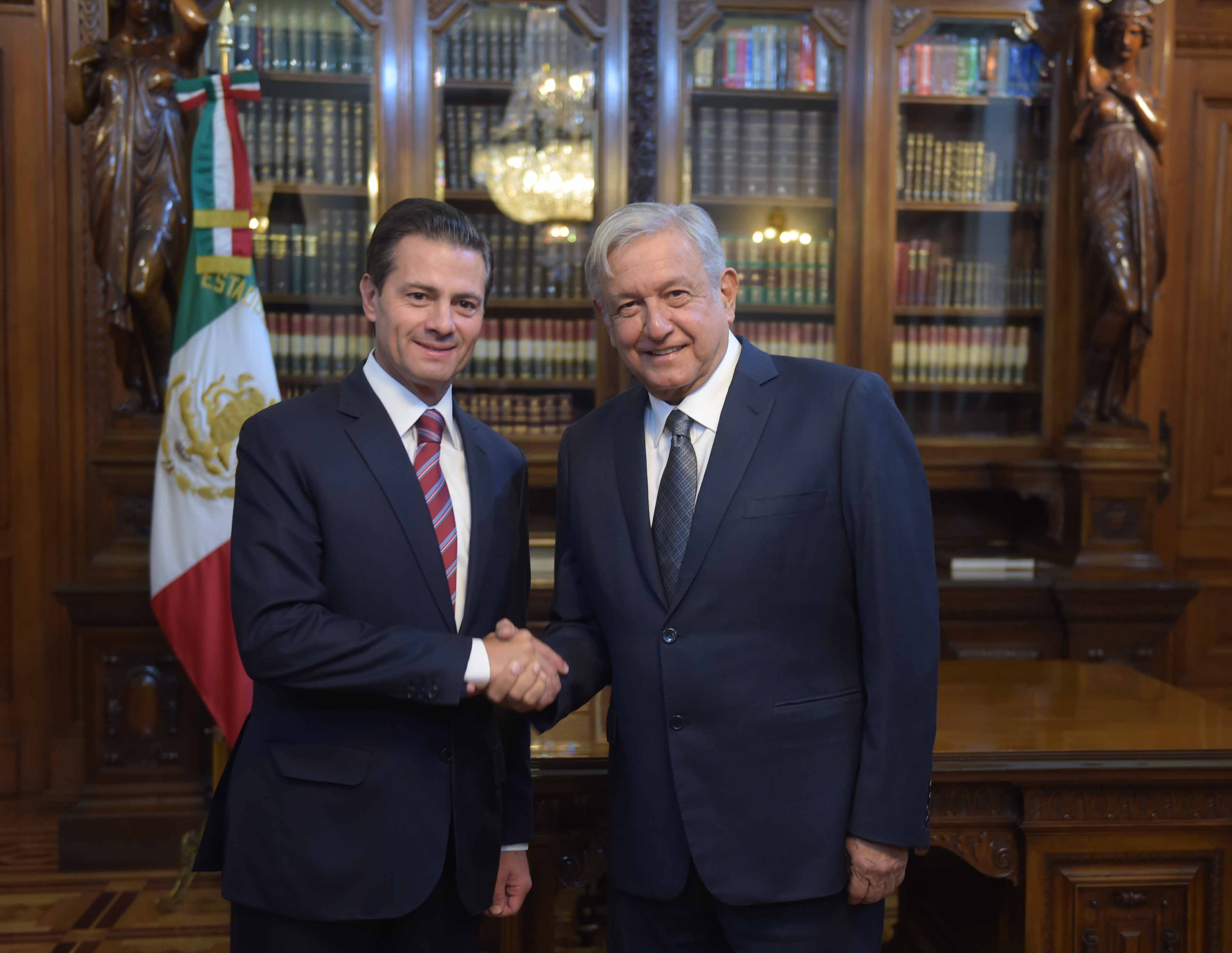
President Enrique Peña Nieto with President-elect López Obrador on 9 August 2018

López Obrador took office on 1 December 2018. When he was president-elect, he announced he would take a 60% salary pay cut.

Before taking office, from 22 to 25 October, he held an impromptu vote, organized by supporters of his party, on whether or not the New International Airport for Mexico City was to be scrapped, citing that the project was rife with corruption, cronyism, and a waste of taxpayer's money. About 70% of the results voted against the continuation of the project. López Obrador proposed expanding the Santa Lucía Air Force Base instead.

In December 2018, López Obrador ordered the creation of a truth commission to re-examine one of the country's most notorious unsolved crimes: the kidnapping and presumed murder of 43 trainee teachers who disappeared after an attack by cartel gunmen and police officers.

After the 2018 presidential election, media organizations, including Forbes, reported that López Obrador said the victory of his party, Morena, was "La Cuarta Transformación" (The Fourth Transformation). The phrase is a reference to three major historical reforms, namely Mexican independence, the Reform War, and the Mexican Revolution.

Just before his 1 December inauguration, a documentary on López Obrador was broadcast on Now This World.

== Presidency (2018–2024) ==
=== Exercise of political power ===
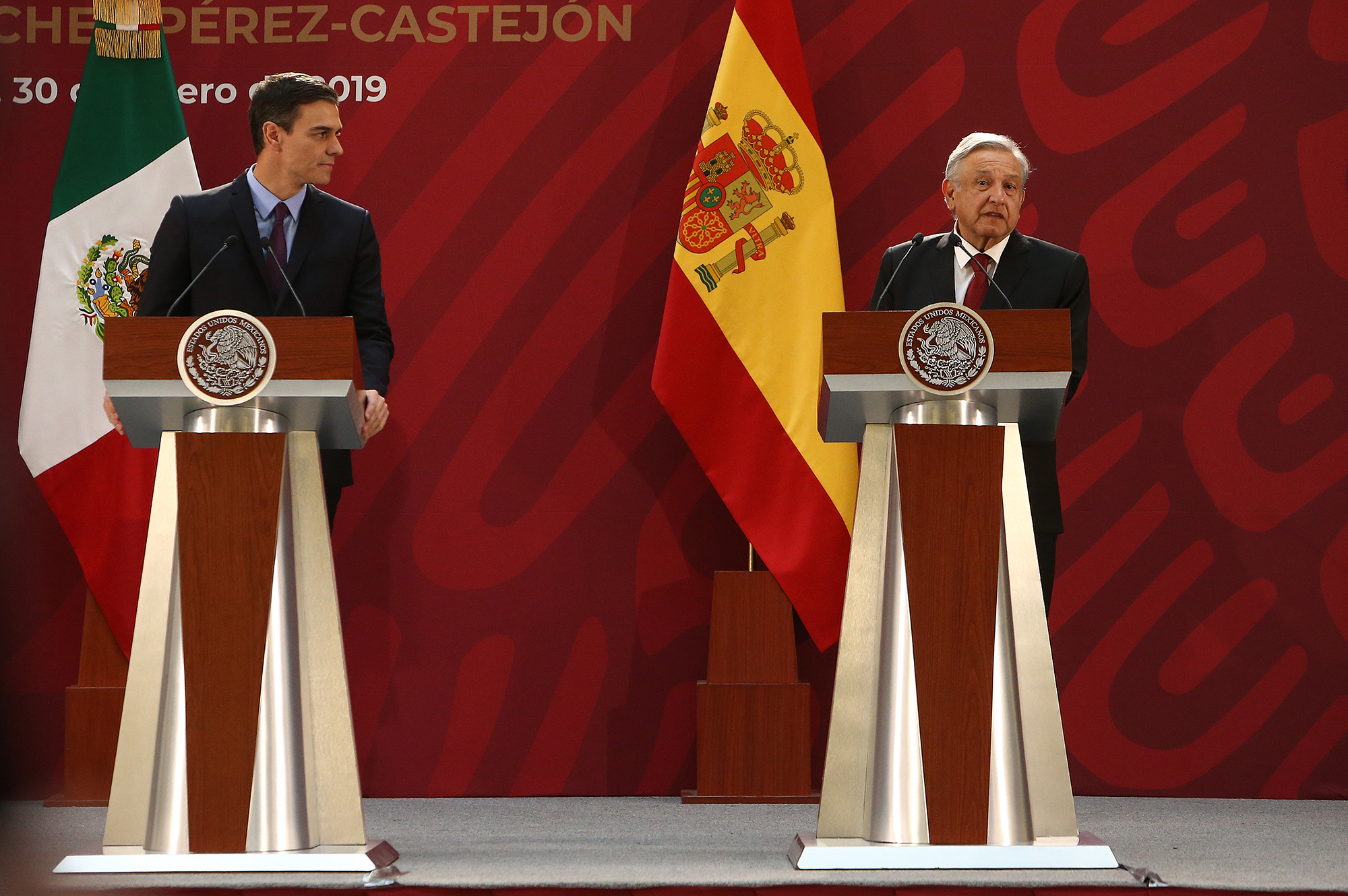
López Obrador with Spain's Prime Minister Pedro Sánchez in January 2019

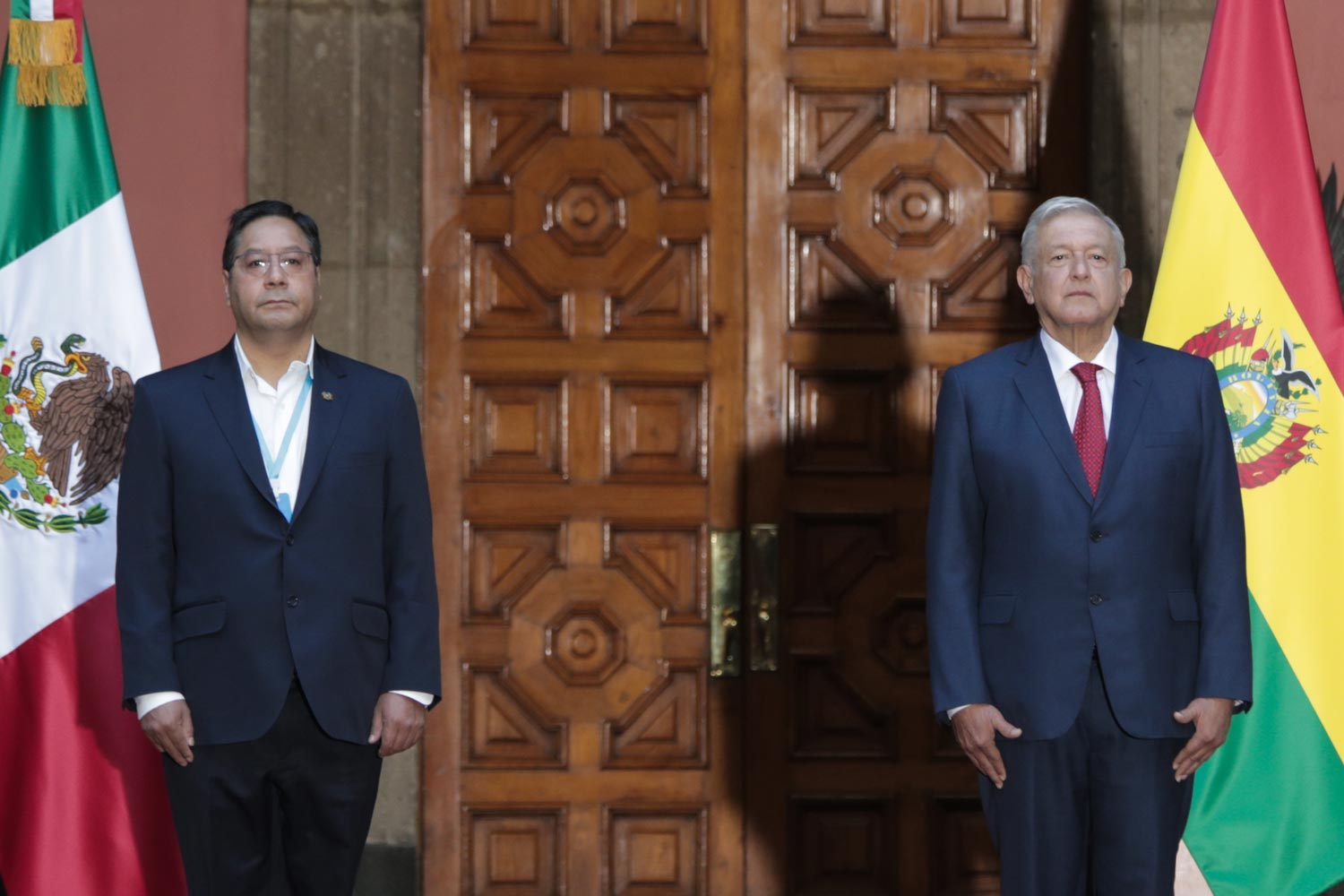
López Obrador with Bolivian President Luis Arce in March 2021

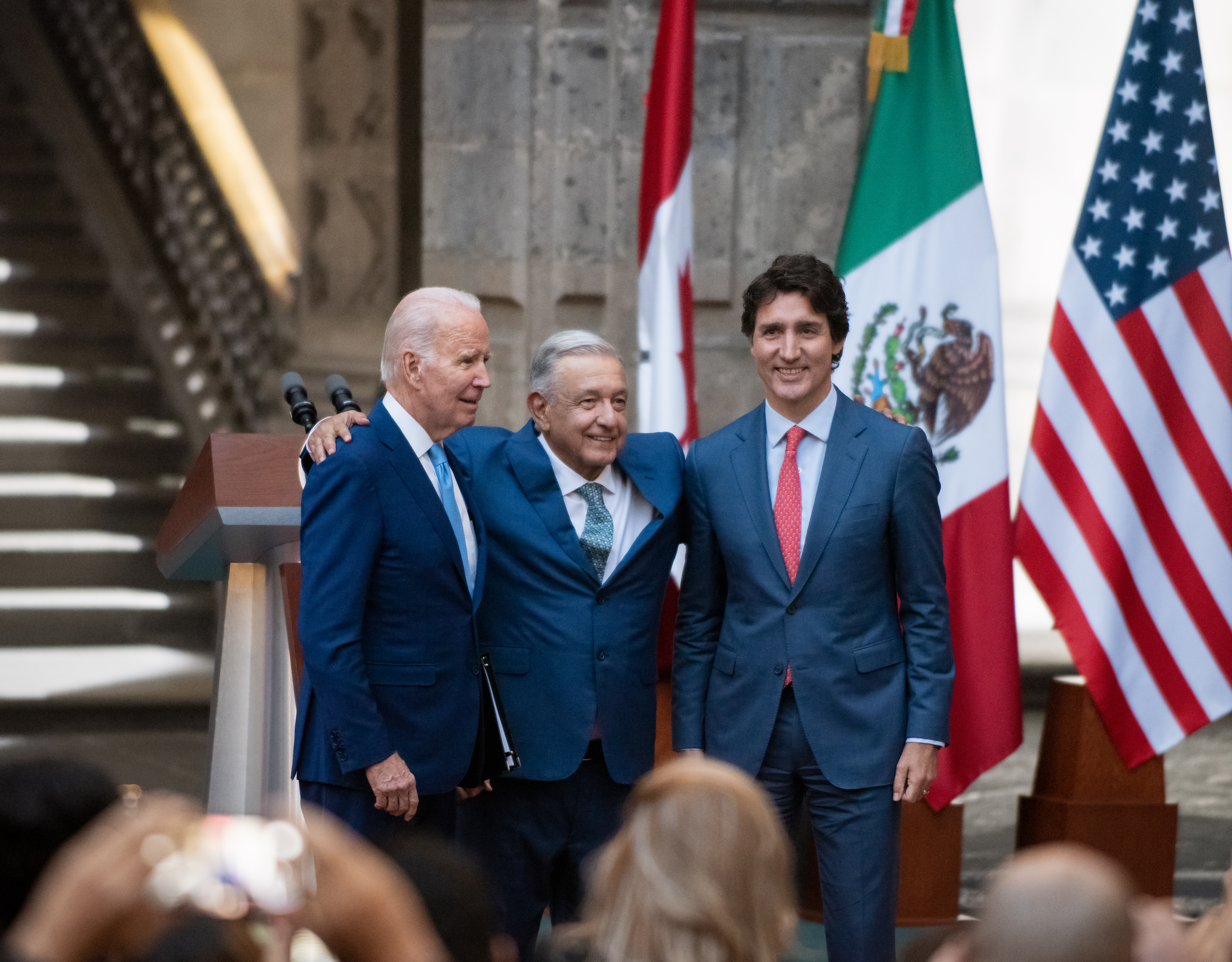
López Obrador with U.S. President Joe Biden and Canadian Prime Minister Justin Trudeau at the North American Leaders' Summit in January 2023

In his first year, López Obrador's approval ratings were high, approximately the same as previous administrations at the same point in their terms. Despite that, there has appeared to be little progress on issues on which he campaigned, which critics pointed out. The Economist criticized his first year as lacking in statecraft and abundant in theatrical gestures. In August 2019, Bloomberg News did an extended interview with López Obrador. The China Global Television Network did a short special assessment of López Obrador's first year in office.

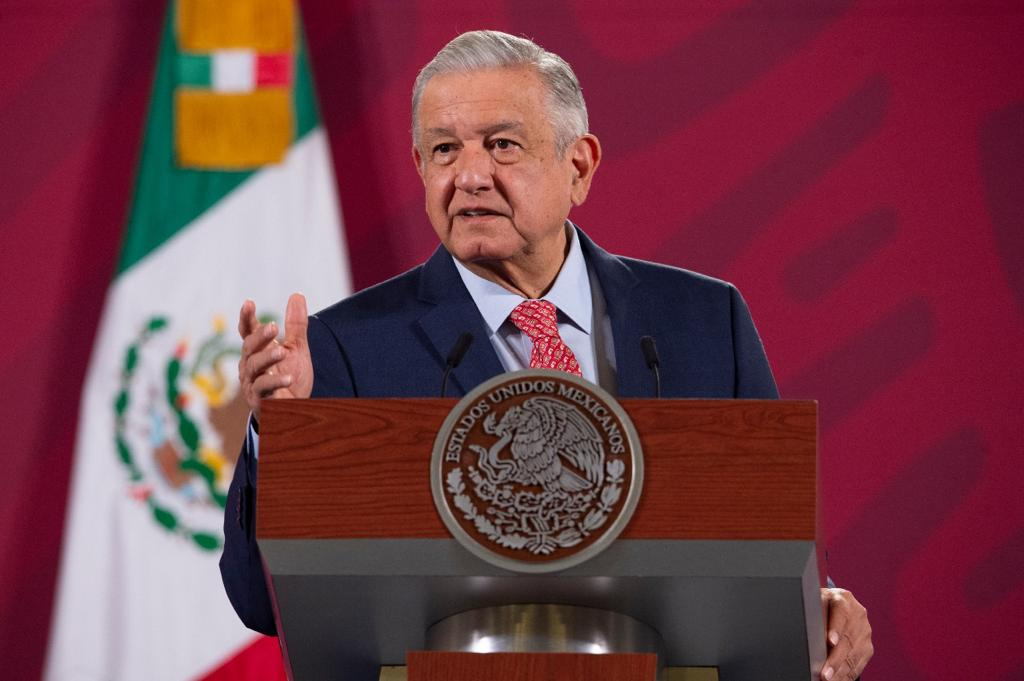
López Obrador hosting his daily morning press conferences known as mañaneras.

He argues his presidency is the "Fourth Transformation" in Mexican history, with the first three being the Mexican War of Independence (1810–1821), the War of the Reform (1857–1861), and the Mexican Revolution (1910–1920). He invokes imagery likening his presidency to the work of Jesus Christ, with concern for the less fortunate being a top priority under López Obrador. Direct communication with the electorate has become a key feature of his presidency. He holds daily briefings (mañaneras) broadcast on state media.

López Obrador stated that citizen forums, consultations, and referendums would be a key part of his decision-making process. Such consultations have been held on major infrastructure projects such as constructing a new airport, an oil refinery, an electric plant, and the Mayan Train. Other consultations have been held on various social issues, and more are planned for the future—including LGBTQ rights and amnesty for low-level drug offenders. In 2020, a judge in Campeche issued an injunction against the Mayan Train, citing its approval in a "simulated consultation".

In 2022, he held a referendum on his presidency, winning with more than 90% of the votes but with a low turnout rate of around 18 percent, far below the 40 percent level needed for the poll to be legally binding. Other consultations held in 2018 and 2019 also enjoyed widespread support (70% or more), but were criticized for low turnout (2% or less) and other reasons.

Morning Consult's Global Leader Approval Rating Tracker, which evaluates the approval rating of 13 world leaders weekly, positioned López Obrador as the second-highest net approval rating as of February 10, 2022.

During his presidency, López Obrador frequently preferred social media blogs and news sites at his briefings and often answered questions only from them. He has also frequently criticized environmentalists, non-governmental organizations, regulatory agencies and social media companies, the latter for alleged political bias. In 2024, a video on his official YouTube channel showing him revealing the phone number of a New York Times reporter who had investigated his associates' connections with drug traffickers was taken down by the site, prompting him to accuse the platform of censorship and being taken over by conservatives.

=== Anti-corruption ===
A top priority during López Obrador's campaign was his pledge to end corruption. In 2018, Mexico was on par with Russia at 138 (of 180 countries), according to Transparency International's Corruption Perceptions Index. López Obrador has made high-profile gestures against corruption, but his critics see them as not getting at the core issue. He stated his administration will no longer employ the agency designed to uncover corruption in government spending, the National Institute for Access to Information and Data Protection (INAI), citing its complicity in covering up high-profile scandals such as the Odebrecht case. Enrique Krauze has criticized López Obrador's move, saying "Now there is absolutely no transparency in the use of public money, and, at the same time, the awarding of contracts to companies owned by the president's friends."

López Obrador's anti-corruption efforts have concentrated in five areas: illegal fuel sales known as Huachicolero, accounting methods and tax fraud, illegal outsourcing, judicial corruption, and money laundering. The Unidad de Inteligencia Financiera on 27 December 2019, announced that it has opened investigations into four former governors. In August 2019 Rosario Robles was sent to prison for her involvement in the MXN $7,760 million (US$420 million) "Master Scam" (Spanish: Estafa Maestra), and charges against former Pemex officials such as CEO Emilio Lozoya Austin and union leader Carlos Romero Deschamps. In October 2019, a justice of the Supreme Court of Justice of the Nation (SCJN) was forced to resign due to irregularities involving an irregular bank deposit worth MXN $80 million (US$4 million).

Despite initial praise from human rights group Washington Office on Latin America (WOLA) in October 2019 regarding Lopez' ambitious plan, which introduced anti-corruption prosecutors both at federal and state levels through an independent National Anti-Corruption System, its 2021 report concluded that, while the structure of the System could theoretically work, it had been essentially crippled by the lack of independence or any real autonomy, amongst other factors.

=== Education ===
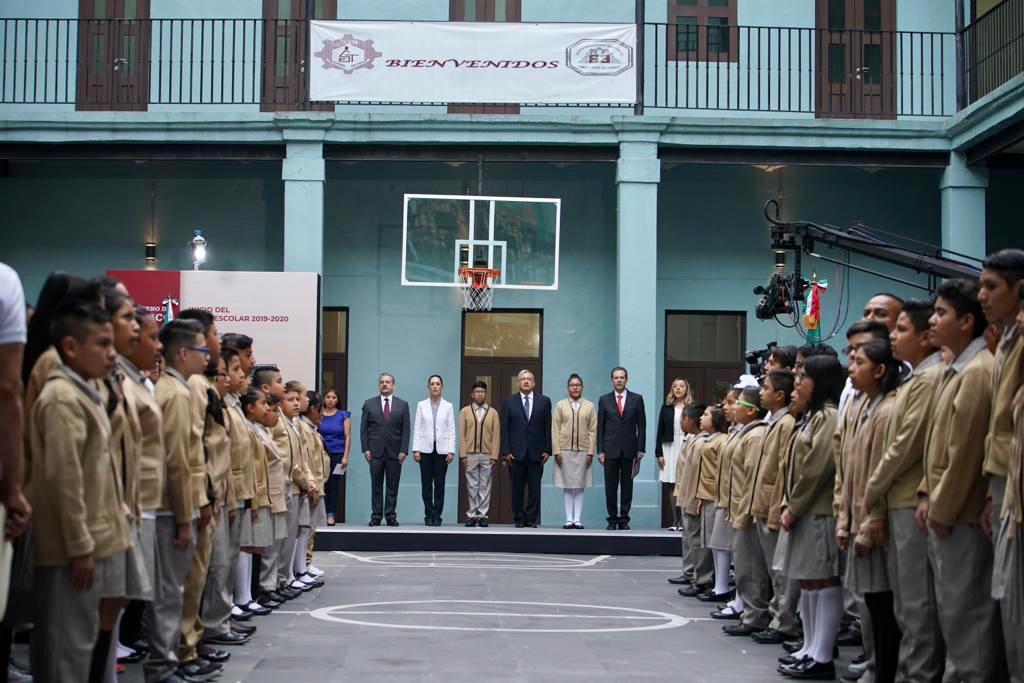
López Obrador at a civic ceremony celebrating the start of the 2019-2020 school year

In 2019 López Obrador consolidated some projects to support the educational system in Mexico, some of them being the creation of one hundred public universities and the approval of the reforms to articles 3, 31 and 73 of the Mexican Constitution, about education, in which parents, teachers and authorities participated. That same year, he also implemented the scholarship program "Bienestar Benito Juárez" in all educational levels of public service, in order to encourage the permanence of students and also reverted the Education Reform implemented during the Peña Nieto administration, replacing it with one that would guarantee free education at all levels.

In 2020, due to the COVID-19 pandemic in Mexico, face-to-face classes were suspended since March, in order to avoid contagions of the disease. In August, the president signed an agreement with the television networks Televisa, TV Azteca, Imagen Televisión and Grupo Multimedios so that preschool, primary and secondary school students could begin receiving classes and educational content on television. In December, he announced Delfina Gómez Álvarez as the new secretary of Public Education, replacing Esteban Moctezuma Barragán, who would become Mexico's ambassador to the United States. In 2021, a protocol was announced with which students could gradually return to face-to-face classes, but only in those states that were on a green light of the epidemiological traffic light during the COVID pandemic. The exchange between Delfina and Moctezuma was officially carried out on 15 February. The return of face-to-face classes since the beginning of the pandemic took place on 7 June in Mexico City, San Luis Potosí and Aguascalientes, and on the 14 of the same month in the State of Mexico. However, this return was silently canceled again when cases of children infected with COVID-19 began to be registered inside schools, little student presence, and the beginning of a third wave of infections by the disease. Despite this, the president announced that the return of face-to-face classes would be "rained, thundered or lighted" in August, one of his motivations being to avoid the supposed "addiction to video games" that kids have today.

=== Economy ===
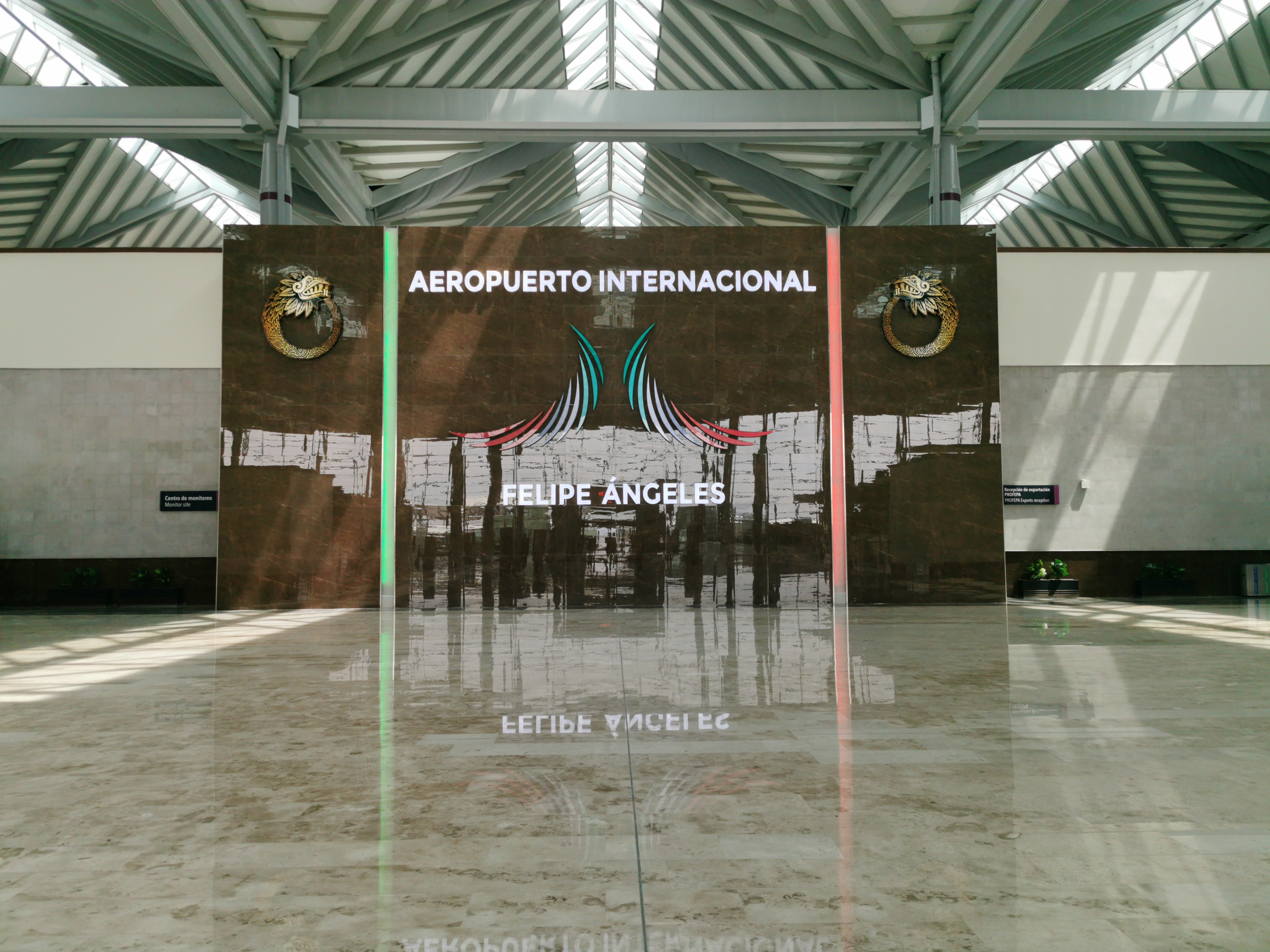
López Obrador oversaw the construction and completion of the new Felipe Ángeles International Airport (AIFA), Mexico City's new second airport.

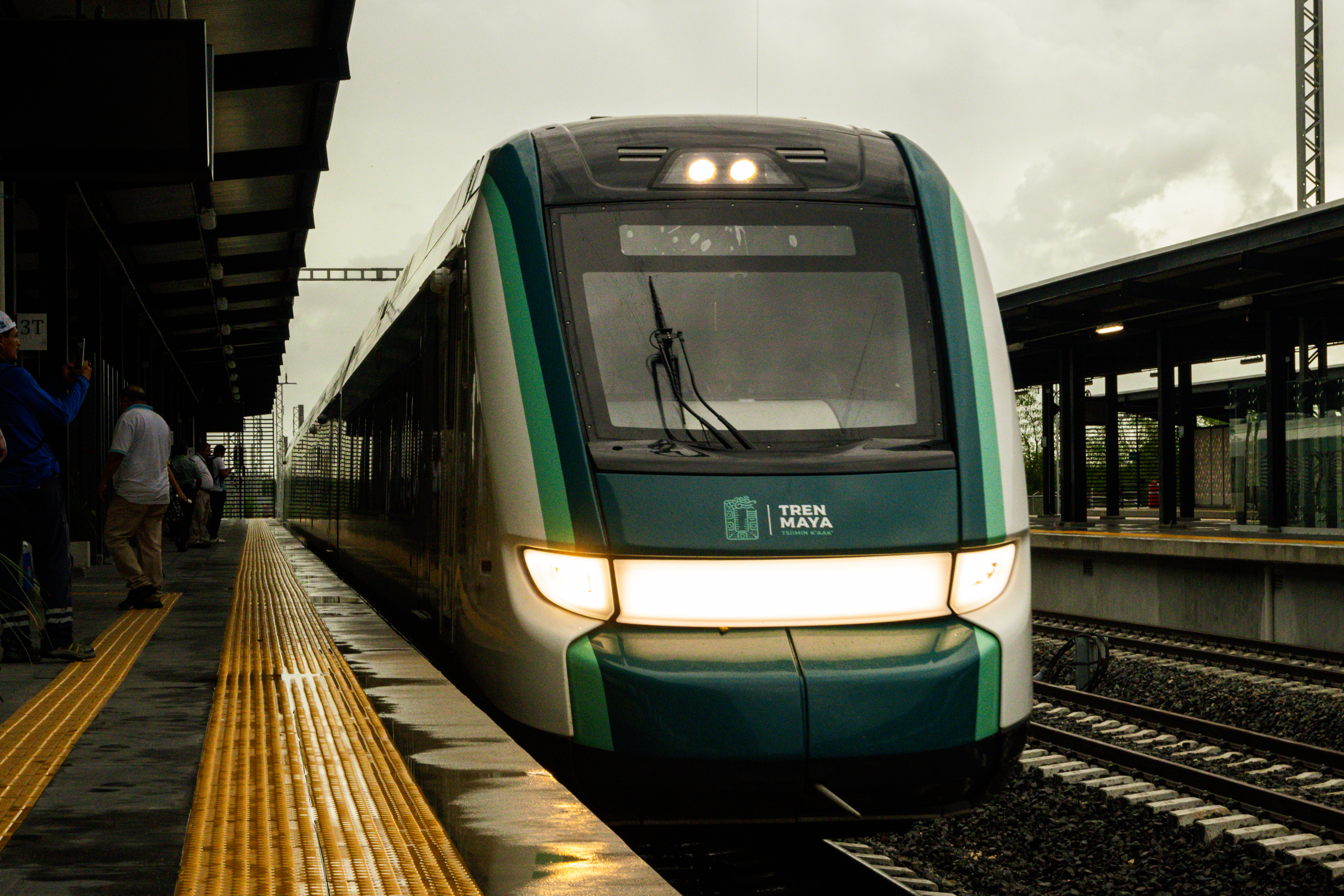
The Tren Maya is one of López Obrador's most famous and controversial mega infrastructure projects.

López Obrador's energy policy has prioritized the state over the market. Petroleum is at the center of his strategy, with the construction of a refinery in Tabasco, and has essentially banned private investment in the sector. There was low or flat economic growth in his first year of office. He implemented a minimum wage increase of 16.21% in 2019 before uplifting the wage increase to 20% the same year. The coronavirus pandemic is expected to cause lasting damage to the economy, with some critics arguing López Obrador has not effectively planned and responded to economic uncertainty, with the peso falling in the first months of the pandemic. López Obrador made good on his promise to cancel the building of a new airport (Texcoco Airport) to serve Mexico City, with $13.3 billion already spent. Instead, the Felipe Ángeles International Airport was reworked to replace it.

The trade deal with the U.S. and Canada was ratified by all three nations and went into effect in July 2020. López Obrador traveled to the U.S. to sign the agreement, but Justin Trudeau, Prime Minister of the third partner, Canada, did not attend, claiming the coronavirus as the reason. Trump and López Obrador signed the agreement at the White House. With the COVID-19 pandemic, remittances from Mexicans in the U.S. have fallen. In addition, with the U.S.-Mexico border increasingly difficult to cross, Mexicans in the U.S. are now aging and dying, often being buried in their hometowns and villages.

His 2023 federal budget prioritized the funding of social programs, including a boost to pensions for older adults and infrastructure projects concentrated largely in southern Mexico. According to José Olivares of The Intercept, leaked intelligence documents indicate the U.S. government is displeased with the Mexican state prioritizing social spending over furthering U.S. interests, such as "investments needed to address bilateral issues with the US, such as migration, security and trade."

=== Response to the COVID-19 pandemic ===
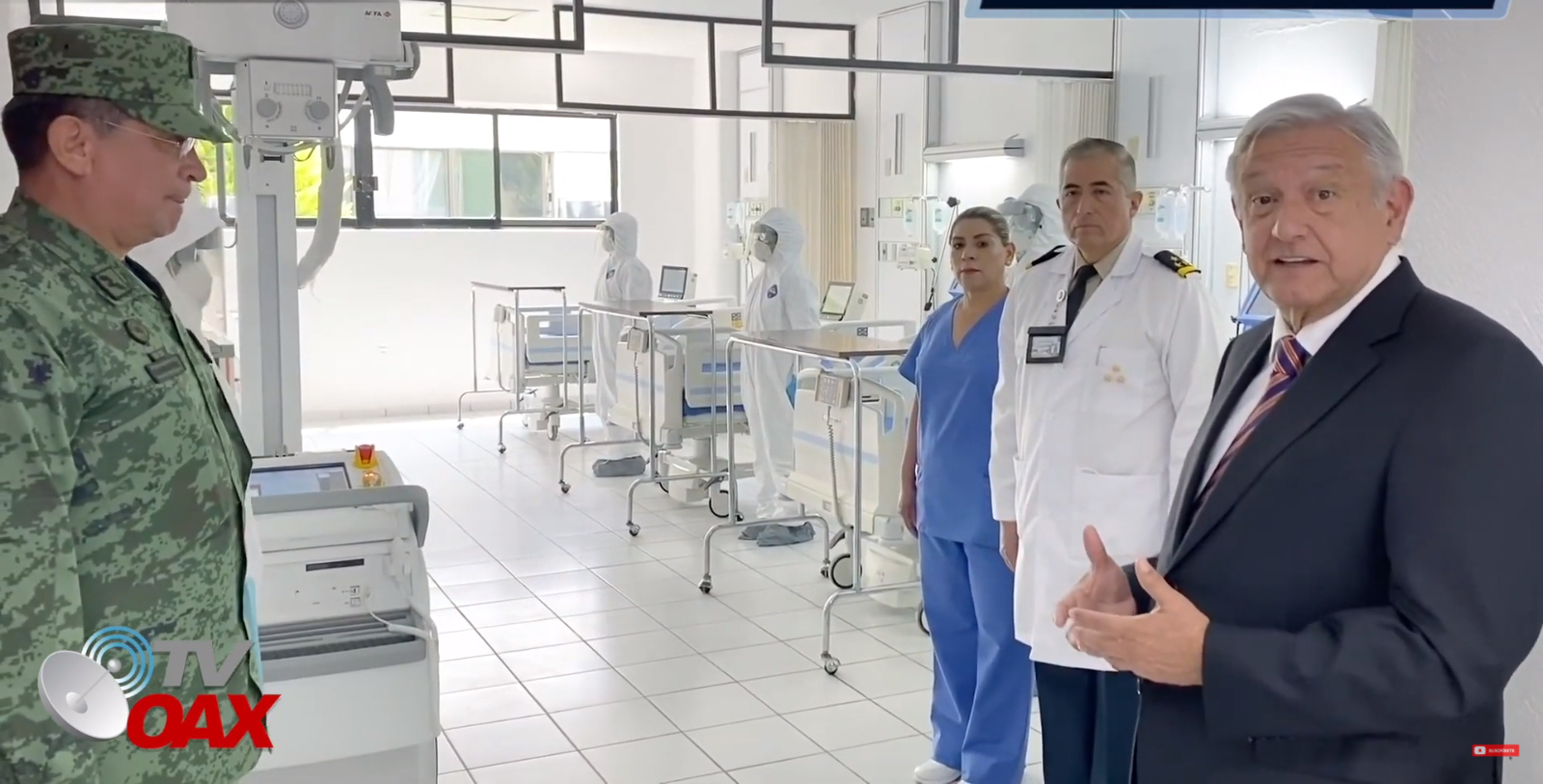
López Obrador visiting a COVID-19 patient area at a Mexico City hospital

According to Los Angeles Times, the initial response by López Obrador's government was as late as March 2020 and was met with significant criticism. The president continued to hold rallies, be tactile with crowds, and downplay the threat of coronavirus to Mexicans' health and the Mexican economy. When COVID-19 arrived in Mexico, the government ramped up preparedness. The healthcare system is undergoing reforms to lessen the possibility of corruption and to shift from the existing insurance system to a universal one. In March 2020, López Obrador pledged to donate a quarter of his salary to help the country weather the pandemic.

As of 25 January 2021, 1,763,219 people have contracted the virus and 149,614 have died.

=== Crime and the drug war ===
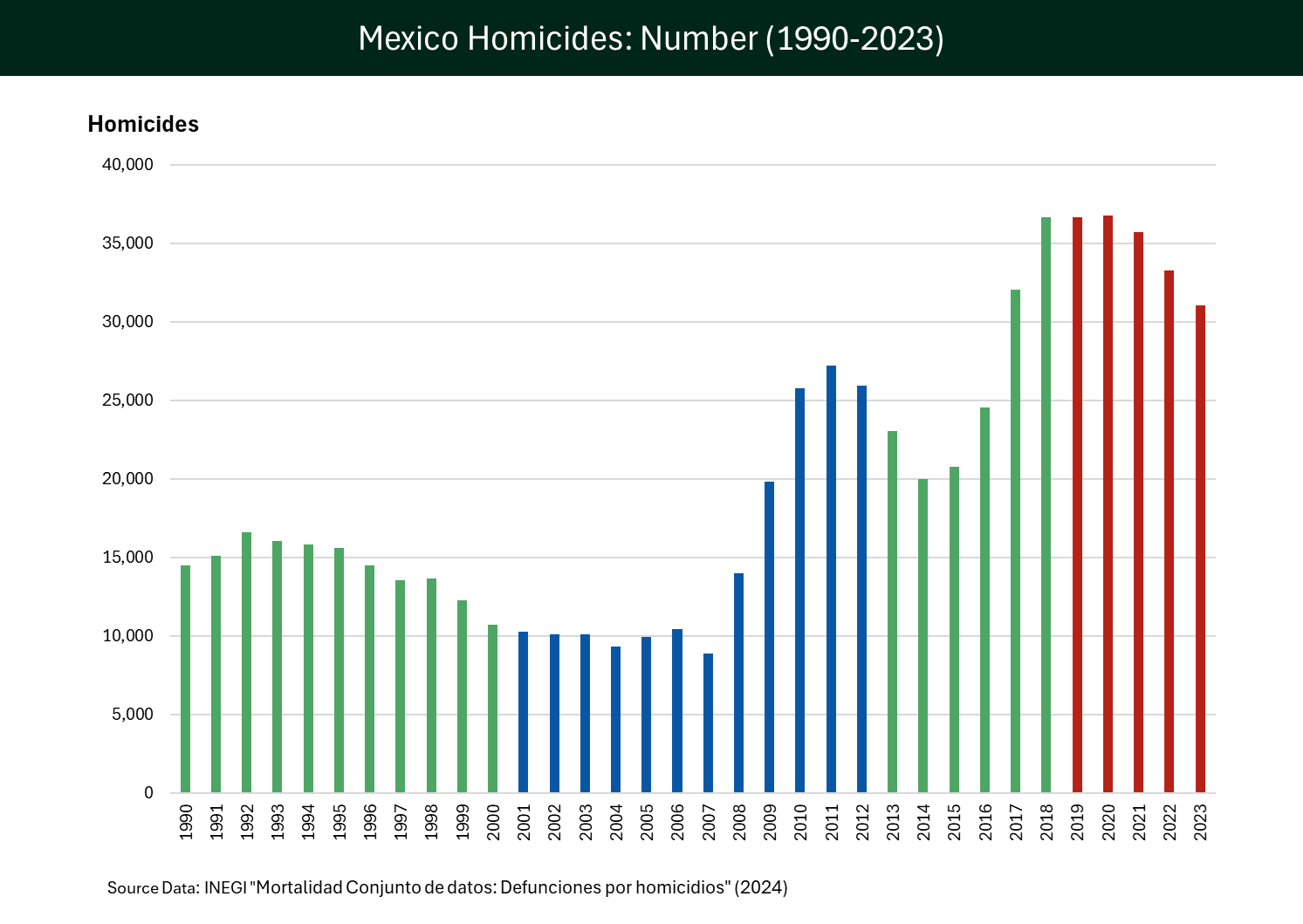
Yearly number of homicides between 2000 and 2023.

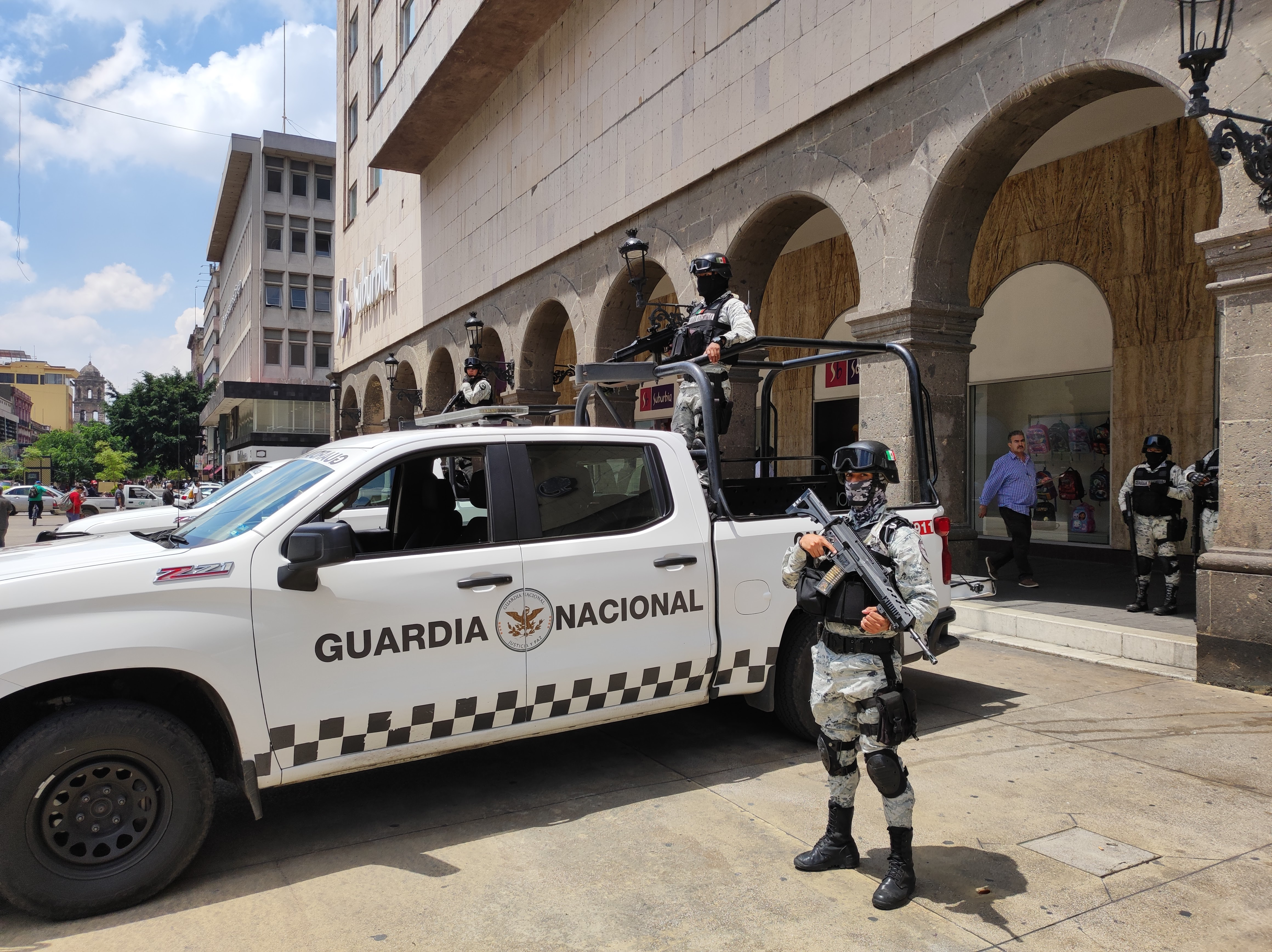
López Obrador replaced the Mexican Federal Police with the new Mexican National Guard.

Rates of crime remain high in Mexico and conflict and violence of drug mafias has not been stemmed. The number of murders nationwide in 2019 was over 34,000. Although the rate of women's murders is only about 10% of that number, femicide (murders of women specifically because they are women) has risen and resulted in major demonstrations in early 2020.

López Obrador initially backed away from the policy of taking out mafia heads. His policy was not a harsh crackdown, offering "abrazos, no balazos"" ("hugs, not gunshots"), which confused and demoralized the security forces. He then gave the army nation-wide control of security.

A high-profile situation developed in Sinaloa in October 2019 when Ovidio Guzmán López "El Ratón", son of imprisoned drug mafia head Joaquín "El Chapo" Guzmán, was captured by a small government force. The mafia responded there with a shootout on the Culiacán city streets, resulting in the government freeing Ovidio Guzmán.

On 5 January 2023, after six months of planning and vigilance, another military operation took place that resulted in Oviedo Guzmán being captured once more, this time successfully, resulting in another fight between the Mexican military and the Sinaloa Cartel on the streets of Culiacán. This all resulted in the deaths of 10 soldiers and 19 members of the cartel, along with the arrests of 21 other alleged members, without civilian casualties, according to official reports. Most of these deaths occurred during the initial shootout between the military and the Sinaloa Cartel while Guzmán was being detained. Obrador claimed that the authorities acted "with responsibility" to protect the civilian population and that the operation was done without any involvement from the U.S. government.

Ovidio Guzmán has now been moved to the "Altiplano" maximum security prison in the State of Mexico. He's expected to be eventually extradited to the U.S. per request of the U.S. government since September 2019. Still, he will remain in Mexico while various legal proceedings take place, as the Mexican Secretary of Foreign Affairs Marcelo Ebrard reported. On the same day, Ernesto Alfredo Piñón de la Cruz "El Neto", leader of the violent criminal organization affiliated with the Sinaloa Cartel known as "Los Mexicles", was killed by state and federal police while trying to flee from his residence during a police raid in Ciudad Juárez, Chihuahua, just four days after violently escaping prison. López Obrador has acceded to U.S. requests to extradite criminals to the U.S.

In Michoacán, drug mafias have been extorting avocado producers, an ongoing issue especially following the rise in demand in the U.S. for the crop.

In April 2020, at the beginning of the coronavirus pandemic, Mexican drug cartels had been handing out food relief in their core regions. López Obrador called on them instead to end the violence. Cartels have been acting with continued impunity in Mexico City, with the Jalisco New Generation Cartel targeting the chief of its police force, Omar García Harfuch for assassination in an early morning. He survived wounded, but two of his bodyguards and a civilian were killed. López Obrador's policy toward drug cartels has been criticized in the press in the United States on an ongoing basis.

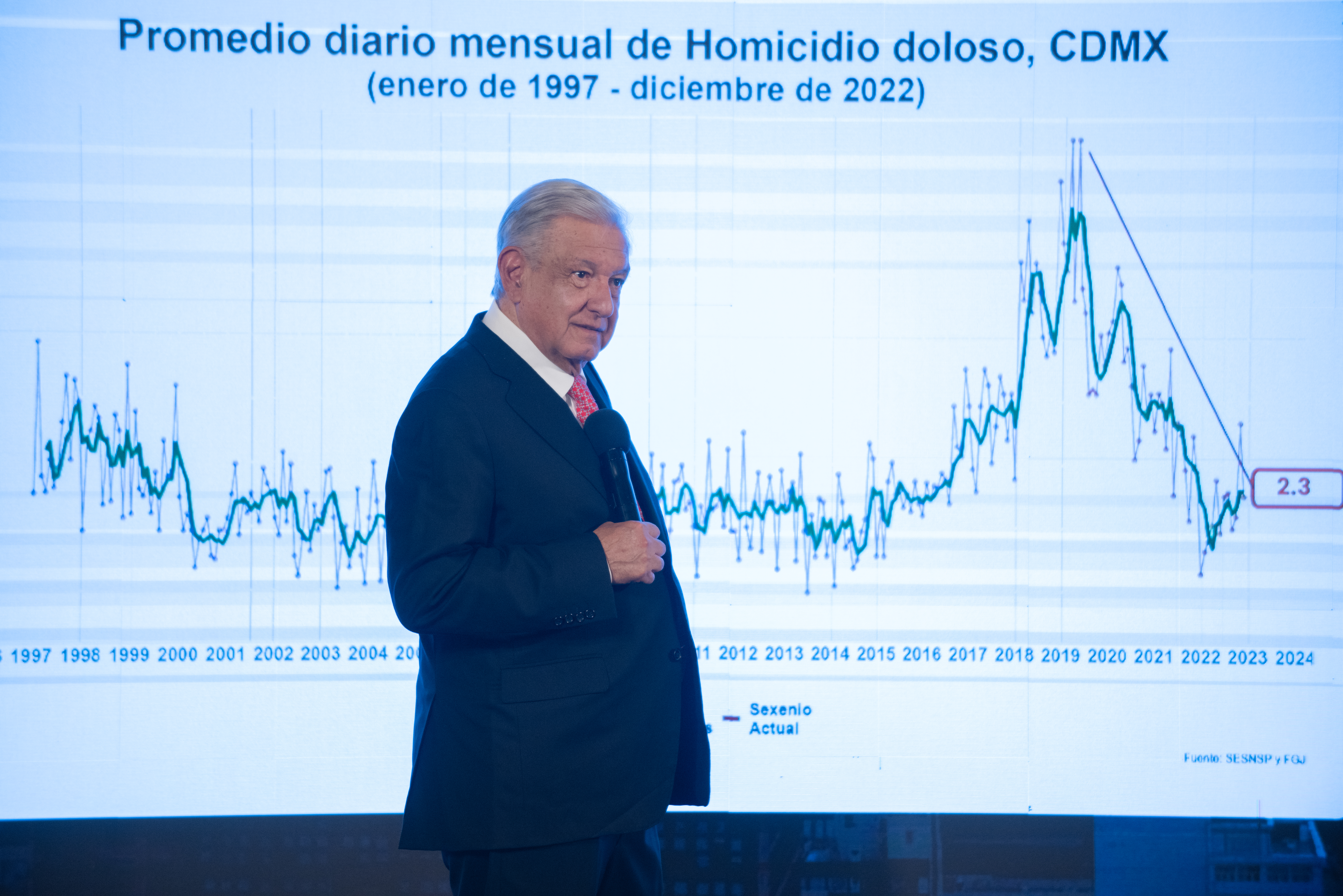
López Obrador demonstrating homicide statistics at one of his mañaneras in July 2024.

Since 2020, a gradual decrease in intentional homicides has been shown nationwide in Mexico. In 2020, the amount of reported intentional homicides was 0.4% less than in 2019, further decreasing by 4.6% in 2021 and again in 2022 by 7.1%. López Obrador stated in his 6 January 2022 report that he plans to continue this trend throughout the rest of his presidency. Despite this, 2019 was one of the most violent years in Mexican history, with 34,690 reported intentional homicides. The reports conclude that nearly half of all intentional homicides in 2022 occurred in six out of 32 states and that 23 states showed a decrease as high as 13%. In the State of Zacatecas, which saw a sharp increase in total homicide rates in 2021 —of 41% in the first 11 months, making it the biggest statewide increase in the country on that year—, intentional homicides decreased by 13.76% and total homicides by 7.57% in 2022, according to the Executive Secretary of the National Public Security System (SESNSP). Though a nationwide decrease has been perceived, some areas have perceived an increase in 2022. In 17 out of the 50 "priority municipalities", where intentional homicides are concentrated, an average increase of 8.5% in such homicides was reported. In contrast, in 32, an average decrease of 24.3% was reported, with Cuernavaca and Morelos being the only municipalities with no reported changes.

Plans to legalize the personal use of marijuana missed a 24 October 2019 SCJN deadline, which was extended to 30 April 2020, as users, growers, and businesses could not agree on details. In June 2021, the Supreme Court in effect legalized the recreational use of cannabis.

As of 2020, the COVID-19 pandemic interrupted supply chains from China to Mexico that provided the precursor chemicals to create fentanyl and methamphetamine, usually then exported to the U.S.

On Monday, 22 January 2024, the United States Court of Appeals for the First Circuit ruled in favor of the Mexican Government regarding a lawsuit filed against several U.S. firearms producers, annulling the case's dismissal by a Massachusetts court in September 2022. The Mexican Government claims that weapons from various gun producers, including Smith & Wesson, Barrett Firearms Manufacturing and several others, are widely used by drug cartels and accuses them of facilitating this through "negligent commercial practices". The lawsuit was originally filed in August 2021, while Marcelo Ebrard was Secretary of Foreign Affairs. The ruling was celebrated by Ebrard and the current Secretary of Foreign Affairs Alicia Bárcena, who enthusiastically claimed it was a "great step" and "great news", respectively. Alejandro Celorio, a legal consultant of the Secretariat of Foreign Affairs, claims this "is to advance in the accountability of those who negligently trade firearms that violate the peace and security of our country." That same day, Bárcena reported during a morning press conference that weapons exclusively used by the U.S. military had illegally entered Mexican territory, and that the governments of both countries agreed on Friday to investigate this problem. For these reasons, the U.S. Ambassador to Mexico Ken Salazar announced that the issue of gun trafficking into Mexico will be central to a meeting between politicians of both countries in February, though he stated he was unaware of the issue regarding U.S. military weapons being smuggled into Mexico and maintains that the authorities of both countries constantly exchange information about the flow of firearms between them. A month prior, Salazar acknowledged that 70% of weapons smuggled into Mexico are of U.S. origin or are manufactured in the U.S. In March 2023, López Obrador claimed that 70% of homicides in Mexico were committed using weapons from the U.S., criticising the U.S. government for this issue.

Just eleven days prior to the Court of Appeals' ruling, a U.S. citizen was arrested by the Mexican authorities during a routine check in Agua Prieta, Sonora, while attempting to cross the border with Arizona, when it was found that he was trying to smuggle over 1300 .50 caliber cartridges into Mexican territory.

=== Response to femicide and women's activism ===
López Obrador's government has been criticized for failing to combat violence against women in Mexico and its high rate of femicide, which has risen since 2018. López Obrador has been accused of being slow to respond to women's demands to act on the issue of femicide. After a particularly well-publicized femicide of a kidnapped girl, women marches spiked nationally; as a result, the Head of Government of Mexico City, Claudia Sheinbaum (who is also a member of Morena) announced new measures to prevent further femicides in the city, while López Obrador also announced a package of new measures to address the issue. Soon after, women's groups called for two days of action, a massive demonstration in Mexico City on International Women's Day (8 March), following by a strike on 9 March 2020. The Mexico City demonstration had some 80,000 participants. On Monday, 9 March 2020, the second day of action was marked by the absence of women at work, in class, shopping and other public activities. The "Day Without Us" (Día Sin Nosotras) was reported in the international press along with the previous day's demonstrations.

=== Foreign policy ===
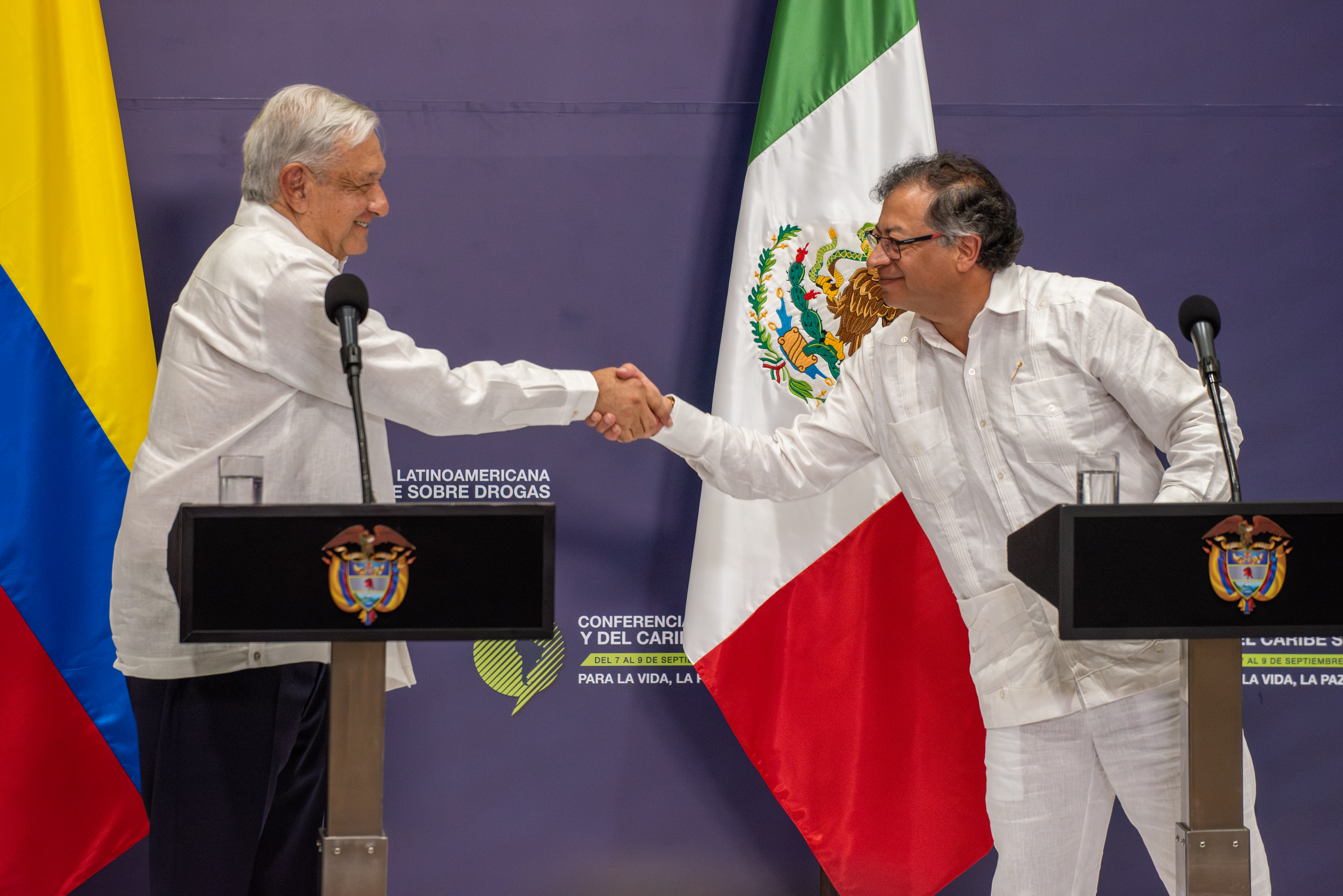
López Obrador with Colombian President Gustavo Petro in September 2023

On 7 November 2023, López Obrador called for a ceasefire in the Gaza war.

==== Immigration and U.S. pressure ====
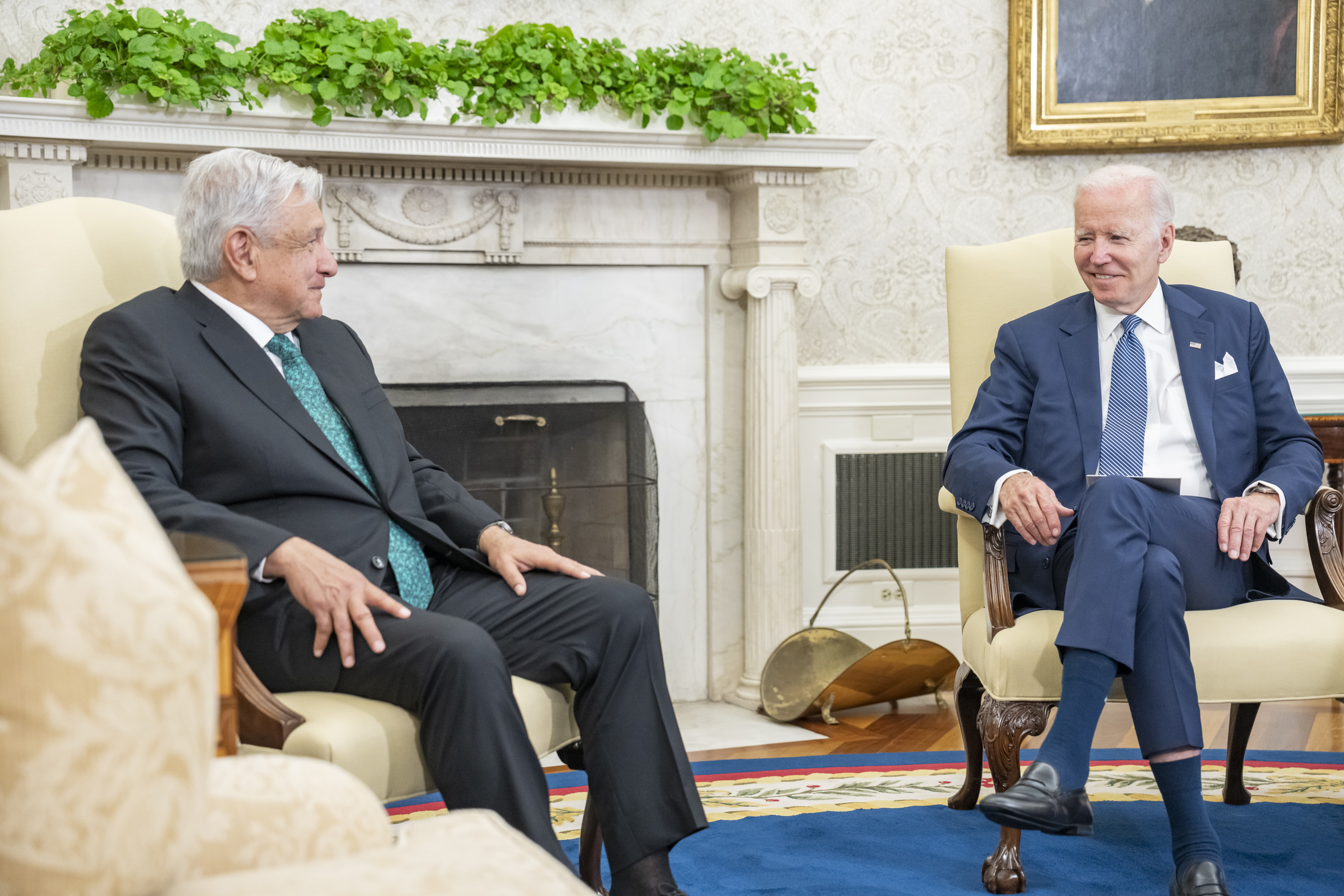
López Obrador meets with U.S. President Joe Biden at the White House in July 2022.

The Trump administration in the U.S. pressed for building a wall on Mexico's northern border, and it also implemented measures attempting to stem the flow of migrants from Central America and other regions of the world. Although López Obrador expressed sympathy with migrants during his campaign, when the number of migrants surged, the U.S. threatened his government with trade sanctions, which led him to solidify the southern border. Government forces broke up migrant caravans heading through Mexico to the U.S. At the northern border, Mexico is now the stopping point for migrants sent back to Mexico by U.S. immigration authorities awaiting adjudication of their asylum claims. Citing widespread corruption, López Obrador dismantled the Federal Police and incorporated elements of it into the recently created National Guard, which has been employed to stop Central American immigrants at the southern border.

In March 2023, López Obrador was sharply critical of some "hypocritical" Republican lawmakers, in particular Dan Crenshaw and Marjorie Taylor Greene, for introducing bills that would authorize the U.S. military to invade Mexico and attack drug cartels, declaring that "we remind those hypocritical and irresponsible politicians that Mexico is an independent and free country, not a colony or a protectorate of the United States."

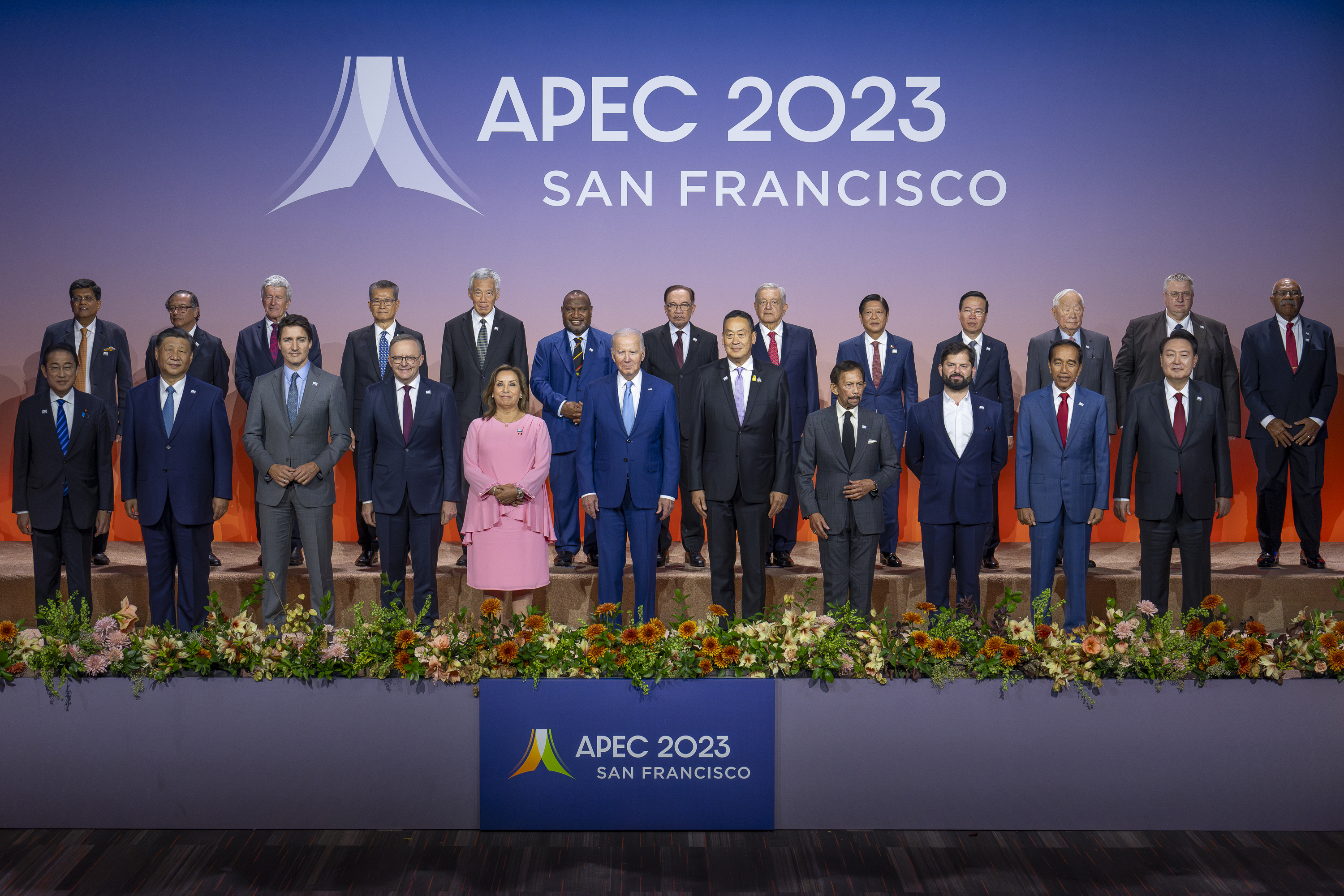
López Obrador attended the 2023 APEC Summit in San Francisco.

==== Political asylum of Evo Morales ====
Former Bolivian President Evo Morales, who was forced to resign amid allegations of fraud in October's presidential election, fled Bolivia during the night of 11 November 2019 on a plane for Mexico, which offered him asylum. Mexican Foreign Minister Marcelo Ebrard said his country decided to grant asylum "for humanitarian reasons, and given the urgent situation faced in Bolivia". AMLO had Mexican government airplane sent to pick him up.

==== Views on Donald Trump ====
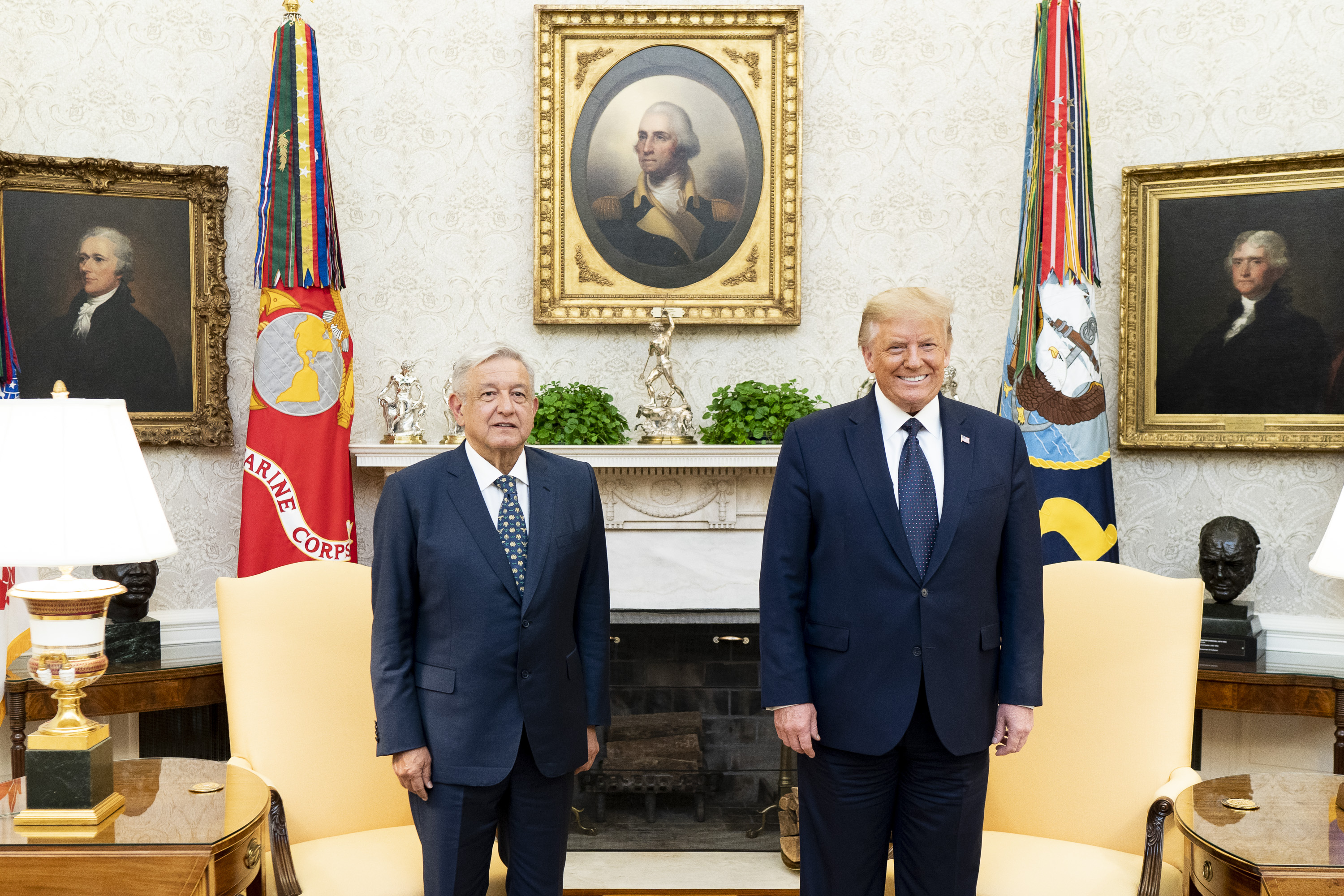
Obrador with U.S. President Donald Trump at the White House in July 2020

López Obrador defended former U.S. president Donald Trump against a potential indictment, saying that "Right now, former President Trump is declaring that they are going to arrest him. If that were the case...it would be so that his name doesn't appear on the ballot." The same month, he criticized the United States, saying the country is "anti-democratic" in seeking to arrest Julian Assange and deny Trump an opportunity to seek re-election. He also referenced the allegations that the U.S. is responsible for the 2022 Nord Stream pipeline sabotage, saying, "If we are talking about acts of violence, how is it that an award-winning journalist in the United States claims that the US government sabotaged the gas pipeline from Russia to Europe?" and criticized the fentanyl epidemic in America.

=== Environment ===
Early in his presidency, López Obrador declared in February 2019 that his government would no longer fund environmental NGOs. Around 6.2 billion Mexican pesos (around USD$321 million at the time) in funding was cut.

In 2020 he cut funding to Mexico's national parks service, the National Commission of Protected Areas (CONANP), by 75 percent and also cut 75 percent of the budget of the National Institute of Anthropology and History (INAH which oversees more than 100,000 heritage and archaeological sites, museums and monuments.

Over the six years of his presidency, López Obrador's government continued to cut funding for environmental protection. Between 2018 and 2023, Mexico's environment department received 35% less money than under the previous government, according to an analysis of Mexico's 2024 budget, including funding cuts to the environmental department of US$510 million (9 billion pesos) or 11% in 2024.

=== Plans for historical commemorations ===
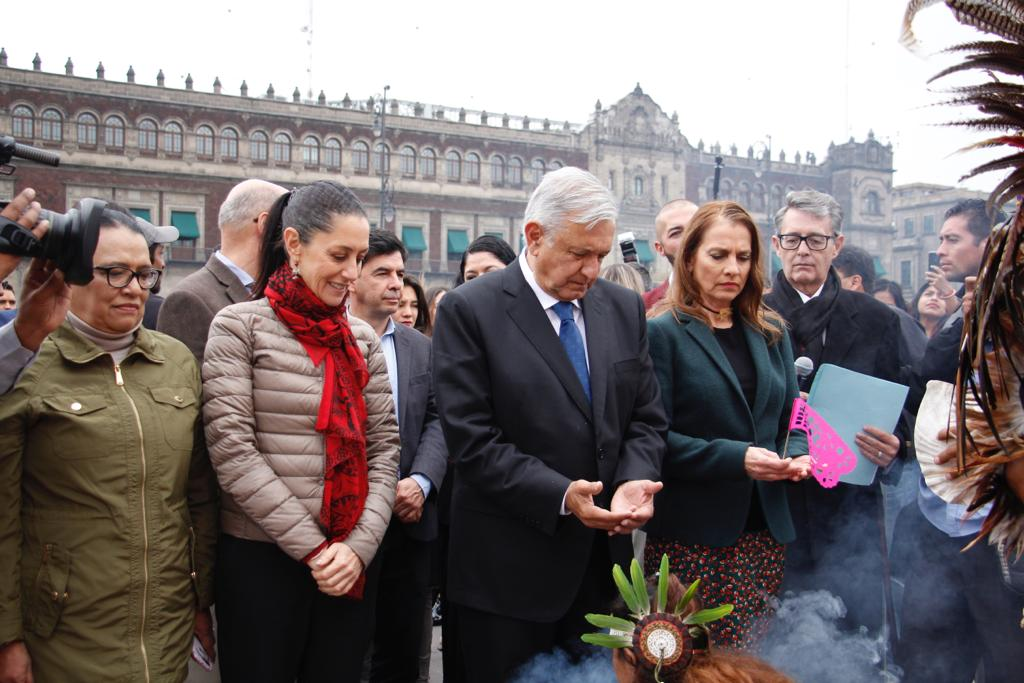
López Obrador at a Dia de los Muertos event in 2019.

Major historical commemorations took place in 2021. The events are the founding of Tenochtitlan (although the date of its founding is often given as 1325); the 1521 fall of Tenochtitlan; and the 1821 consummation of Mexican independence. The Mexico City Metropolitan Cathedral is being repaired, along with other colonial-era buildings in advance of the commemorations. During conmemorations, he apologized in the name of Mexico to indigenous peoples and Mexicans of Chinese descent for historical abuses. López Obrador invited King Felipe VI of Spain and Pope Francis to Mexico for the commemorations, and asked them to apologize for the conquest of America. The Pope declined the invitation, saying he had apologized in 2015.

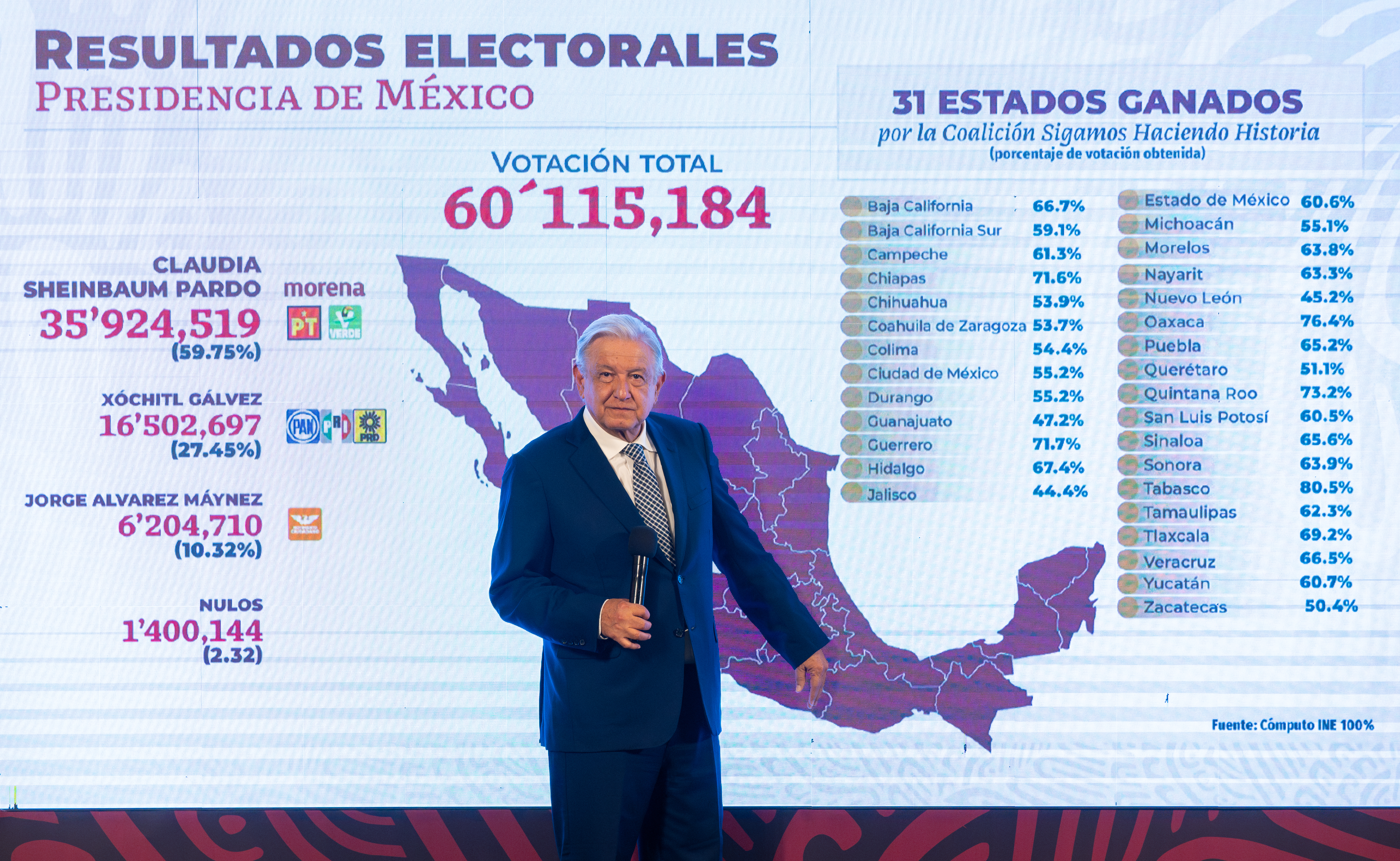
López Obrador demonstrating the results of the 2024 Mexican general election at one of his mañaneras.

=== 2021 midterm elections ===
In the June 2021 midterm elections, López Obrador's Juntos Hacemos Historia coalition lost seats in the lower house of Congress. However, his ruling coalition maintained a simple majority, but López Obrador failed to secure a two-thirds congressional supermajority. The main opposition was a coalition of Mexico's three traditional parties: the PRI, the PAN, and the PRD.

== Post-presidency (2024–present) ==
After leaving office on 30 September 2024, López Obrador largely withdrew from public political life and returned to his ranch in Palenque, in the southern state of Chiapas.

On 1 June 2025, López Obrador briefly reappeared in public to vote in the 2025 judicial elections, held following the judicial reform enacted during his presidency. He cast his ballot at a polling station in Palenque and described his participation as a civic duty, while reiterating his support for his successor, Claudia Sheinbaum.

López Obrador generally maintains a low public profile, per longstanding Mexican tradition that former presidents fade into the background so as not to appear to interfere with their successor. However, he has occasionally commented on public affairs. In January 2026, he criticized the capture of Venezuelan president Nicolás Maduro during a United States operation, describing the action as a kidnapping and a violation of Venezuelan sovereignty. In March 2026, he called on Mexicans to donate funds to send humanitarian aid to Cuba amid an economic and energy crisis on the island.

== Awards and honours ==
=== National honour ===
- Mexico: Grand Master and Collar of the Order of the Aztec Eagle (1 December 2018).

=== International honors ===
- Guatemala: Great Collar of the Order of the Quetzal (5 May 2022).
- Honduras: Grand Cross of the Order of José Cecilio del Valle (6 May 2022).
- Cuba: Medal of the Order of José Martí (8 May 2022).

=== Awards ===
- World No Tobacco Day Award by the World Health Organization, in 2022.
- Ig Nobel Prize in medical information (Satirical award), (shared with Jair Bolsonaro, Boris Johnson, Narendra Modi, Alexander Lukashenko, Recep Tayyip Erdoğan, Vladimir Putin, and Gurbanguly Berdimuhamedow) (2020)

=== Places named after López Obrador ===
In October 2019, López Obrador said he wanted to retire in peace once he left the presidency and did not want any streets or statues named for him. Nevertheless, on 18 July 2020, the newspaper El Universal published a list of places that bear his name:

- López Obrador Street, Tezontitla, Xochimilco, Mexico City (since 2003)
- Avenida López Obrador, San Vicente Chicolapa de Juárez, Chimalhuacán, State of Mexico
- A neighborhood in Arcelia municipality, Guerrero
- An alley in La Montaña de Guerrero, Acapulco, Guerrero
- A street in San Juan Bautista Tuxtepec, Oaxaca
- A street in La Concepción, Jilotepec, Veracruz

== Publications ==
- López Obrador, Andrés Manuel (1986). Los Primeros Pasos, Tabasco, 1810-1867. Villahermosa, Tabasco: Universidad Juárez Autónoma de Tabasco. OCLC 21117234.
- —————————————— (1988). Del esplendor a la sombra: la República restaurada, Tabasco 1867-1876. Villahermosa, Tabasco: Universidad Juárez Autónoma de Tabasco. OCLC 48297841.
- —————————————— (1990). Tabasco, Víctima de un Fraude. Mexico City: Nuestro tiempo. OCLC 651573248.
- —————————————— (1996). Entre la Historia y la Esperanza: corrupción y lucha democrática en Tabasco. Mexico City: Grijalbo. OCLC 906604879.
- —————————————— (1999). Fobaproa, expediente abierto: reseña y archivo. Mexico City: Grijalbo. OCLC 654341802.
- —————————————— (2004). Un proyecto alternativo de nación: hacia un cambio verdadero. Mexico City: Grijalbo. ISBN 9685956979.
- —————————————— (2005). Contra el desafuero: mi defensa jurídica. Mexico City: Grijalbo. ISBN 9685957908.
- —————————————— (2007). La mafia nos robó la Presidencia. Mexico City: Grijalbo. ISBN 9789707802155.
- —————————————— (2008). La gran tentación: el petróleo de México. Mexico City: Grijalbo. ISBN 9789708105651.
- —————————————— (2010). La mafia que se adueñó de México... y el 2012. Mexico City: Grijalbo Mondadori. ISBN 9786073100694.
- —————————————— (2012). No decir adiós a la esperanza. Mexico City: Grijalbo. ISBN 9786073113434.
- —————————————— (2014). Neoporfirismo hoy como ayer. Mexico City: Grijalbo. ISBN 9786073123129.
- —————————————— (2015). El poder en el trópico. Mexico City: Planeta mexicana. ISBN 9786070728211.
- —————————————— (2016). Catarino Erasmo Garza Rodríguez ¿Revolucionario o Bandido?. México City: Planeta. ISBN 9786070733314.
- —————————————— (2017). 2018 La salida. Decadencia y renacimiento de México. Mexico City: Planeta. ISBN 9786070738739.
- —————————————— (2017). Oye, Trump. Mexico City: Planeta. ISBN 9786070742644.
- —————————————— (2019). Hacia una economía moral. Mexico City: Planeta. ISBN 9786070764820.
- —————————————— (2021). A la mitad del camino. Mexico City: Planeta. ISBN 9786070780950.
- —————————————— (2024). ¡Gracias!. Mexico City: Planeta. ISBN 9786073911450.
- —————————————— (2025). Grandeza. Mexico City: Planeta. ISBN 9786073938587.
- —————————————— (2026). Pueblo. Mexico City: Planeta. ISBN 9786073951272.

== See also ==
- List of international presidential trips made by Andrés Manuel López Obrador
- ¿Quién es el señor López? – a 2006 documentary film
- Pink tide
- History of Mexico
- History of democracy in Mexico
- Politics of Mexico
- Mexican drug war
- Fourth Transformation
- COVID-19 pandemic in Mexico

== Notes ==
Party political offices
Preceded by Porfirio Muñoz Ledo	Leader of the Party of the Democratic Revolution; 1996–1999	Succeeded by Pablo Gómez Álvarez
Preceded by Cuauhtémoc Cárdenas	PRD nominee for President of Mexico; 2006, 2012	Succeeded by Ricardo Anaya
Preceded by Martí Batres	President of Morena; 2012–2017	Succeeded by Yeidckol Polevnsky Gurwitz
New political party	Morena nominee for President of Mexico; 2018	Succeeded by Claudia Sheinbaum
Political offices
Preceded by Rosario Robles	Head of Government of Mexico City; 2000–2005	Succeeded by Alejandro Encinas Rodríguez
Preceded by Enrique Peña Nieto	President of Mexico; 2018–2024	Succeeded by Claudia Sheinbaum
Diplomatic posts
Preceded by Jeanine Áñez	President pro tempore of CELAC; 2020–2022	Succeeded by Alberto Fernández
