= Carlos Manzo =

Mexican politician (1985–2025)

- Manzo in 2025

Municipal president of Uruapan
- In office 1 September 2024 – 1 November 2025
- Preceded by: Ignacio Campos Equihua
- Succeeded by: Grecia Quiroz (Interim: Hilda Flor del Campo Medina)

Member of the Chamber of Deputies
- In office 1 September 2021 – 24 February 2024
- Preceded by: Ignacio Campos Equihua
- Succeeded by: Esteban Rafael Constantino Magaña
- Constituency: 9th district of Michoacán

Personal details
- Born: Carlos Alberto Manzo Rodríguez; 9 April 1985 (Note: According to Manzo himself in an interview and his posthumous Facebook profile, he was born on 9 April 1985. However, the Secretariat of the Interior's Legislative Information Service (SIL) gives his birthdate as 9 May of that year, and some news stories use that date.) Uruapan del Progreso, Michoacán, Mexico
- Died: 1 November 2025 (aged 40) Uruapan del Progreso, Michoacán, Mexico
- Cause of death: Assassination by shooting
- Party: Independent (2024–2025)
- Other political affiliations: Morena (2020–2024)
- Spouse: Grecia Quiroz
- Children: 2
- Education: Instituto Tecnológico y de Estudios Superiores de Occidente

Carlos Alberto Manzo Rodríguez (Note: In this Mexican name, the surname is Manzo and the second or maternal family name is Rodríguez.) (9 April 1985 – 1 November 2025) was a Mexican politician known for his outspoken stance against organized crime groups in Mexico. In 2024, he successfully ran as an independent for the office of municipal president (mayor) of Uruapan, Michoacán.

Manzo was the son of the founder of Uruapan's first gallery for visual artists. He earned a degree in political science and public administration from the Instituto Tecnológico y de Estudios Superiores de Occidente (ITESO). Before running for elected office, he worked as an auditor for the Mexican Social Security Institute (IMSS) in Michoacán and was involved with the youth wing of the Institutional Revolutionary Party (PRI). He ran as an independent candidate in the 2018 general election, competing to represent Michoacán's 9th congressional district in the Chamber of Deputies, but lost.

Three years later, he sought the same seat as a candidate of the National Regeneration Movement (Morena) and was elected for the 2021–2024 term. As a deputy, Manzo became known for publicly addressing reports of police misconduct in Uruapan. He resigned in 2024 to seek the mayoralty of Uruapan as an independent, following his departure from Morena, which had decided not to nominate him. He won by a landslide, securing 66 percent of the vote. As mayor, Manzo gained national attention after declaring a zero-tolerance stance against organized crime in the municipality and criticizing President Claudia Sheinbaum's security policies; as a result, he received comparisons with Salvadoran president Nayib Bukele and his gang crackdown strategy, although he rejected the analogy.

During the evening of 1 November 2025 – Day of the Dead in Mexico – he was shot dead at a festival and his assassination drew widespread outrage in Uruapan. Protests were organized in Uruapan and nationwide against the Sheinbaum administration. Grecia Quiroz, Manzo's wife, was later appointed as his successor vowing to carry on his stance against organized crime.

== Early and personal life ==
Carlos Alberto Manzo Rodríguez was born on 9 April 1985 in Uruapan, the second largest city in the state of Michoacán. He was the son of Juan Manzo Ceja, founder of the first gallery for visual artists in the city and who led a peaceful civil protest in 1992 denouncing a local electoral fraud. Carlos worked at the gallery, and later earned a bachelor's degree in political science and public administration from the Instituto Tecnológico y de Estudios Superiores de Occidente (ITESO), a Jesuit university in Guadalajara, Jalisco.

Manzo was married to Grecia Itzel Quiroz García, who was a candidate for the Congress of Michoacán's 20th district (South Uruapan) in 2024. They have two children. At the time of Carlos's assassination, his brother, Juan Daniel, was serving as the deputy secretary of the interior for the state of Michoacán.

== Political career ==
Manzo worked as an administrative assistant and coordinator at three firms. His first involvement in politics was with the youth branch of the Institutional Revolutionary Party (PRI). From 2017 to 2018, he was an auditor with the Mexican Social Security Institute (IMSS) in Michoacán. In the 2018 general election, he competed to represent Michoacán's 9th congressional district (Uruapan) in the Chamber of Deputies as an independent candidate, but finished with less than 10 percent of the votes cast in a six-way race.

Manzo stood again for the same district in the 2021 mid-terms as the candidate of the National Regeneration Movement (Morena) and was elected with 41.5 percent of the vote, beating eight other contenders. During his term in the lower house, he proposed legislation to impose a penalty of between one and four years' incarceration, or a fine of between 180 and 360 times the daily minimum wage, on any person committing negligent firearm discharge; the initiative did not prosper. He also served on the standing committees responsible for climate change and sustainability, health, and social security.

On 25 November 2023, Congressman Manzo was detained by the National Guard in Uruapan after he reported that local police officers who were not part of the traffic police had allegedly attempted to extort a woman traveling in her vehicle. Manzo stated that he was assaulted and was warned to "stop monitoring the police". He was released after residents protested against the National Guard, and his congressional alternate, Esteban Rafael Constantino Magaña, documented Manzo's condition on Facebook. According to Manzo:

They beat me and arrested me illegally even though they knew I have constitutional immunity granted by the people of Uruapan. They don't want us monitoring them because they are stealing from avocado pickers. We're fed up. They threatened to kill me if they saw me patrolling the streets of Uruapan again. I hold the governor of Michoacán, Alfredo Ramírez Bedolla, and General [José Alfredo] Ortega responsible.

=== Municipal president of Uruapan ===
==== Candidacy ====
Manzo resigned his seat in Congress on 27 February 2024 to run for the municipal presidency of Uruapan in the 2024 election, held on 2 June. He initially sought Morena's nomination for the position, but lost to the incumbent, Ignacio Campos Equihua. Manzo stated that the internal poll lacked transparency, arguing that he had significant political support. Having been a critic of Campos's administration, he decided to run as an independent. A Massive Caller survey from February 2024 placed Campos at 53.2 percent in voter preference and Manzo at 14 percent. In the 2 June election, Manzo won by a landslide, receiving 66 percent of the vote in a six-way race and, on 1 September 2024, took office as Uruapan's first independent mayor. (Note: The 2024 general election also saw independent politician Guadalupe Mendoza Arias returned to Congress for Michoacán's 9th: the only candidate to win a seat without the backing of any of the country's registered political parties. Both she and Manzo belonged to the Movimiento del sombrero ("Hat Movement"), a local grouping that also won two seats in the state congressional election held on the same day.)

==== Security management ====
Uruapan is known as the "avocado capital of the world" and, in the context of the Mexican drug war, members of the Jalisco New Generation Cartel (CJNG) and Cárteles Unidos operate in the area, extorting local farmers. Manzo's administration adopted a hard line against organized crime, based on "direct confrontation". After the killing of a female municipal worker on 21 May 2025, Manzo authorized the municipal police to use deadly force against criminals who attacked the public or resisted arrest. Given the federal government's prioritization of criminal prosecutions over armed confrontations, this approach earned him censure of President Claudia Sheinbaum. She considered it incorrect and that the rule of law was to be upheld. In response, Manzo challenged her to resolve the insecurity crisis in the municipality with the federal government's "Hugs, not slugs" policy. "There can be no hugs for criminals," he said, and offered to step aside from his position as mayor if she thought she could resolve the situation "with kind words and calls for surrender" without firing a shot.

In September 2025, following the murder of a municipal police officer, Manzo canceled Independence Day festivities in the municipality – including the traditional re-enactment of the Grito de Dolores and a planned parade – and requested direct support from President Sheinbaum to contain the violence in the area caused by the presence of illegally armed criminal gangs. The federal and state governments deployed 300 members of the security forces to the municipality on 30 September, but they were withdrawn two weeks later. Manzo believed that the support was withdrawn because he had symbolically closed the Uruapan cable car construction project being carried out by the state government in the municipality.

In several videos posted to his social media accounts, Manzo asked the federal and state governments for military and police assistance. He also requested that the federal government supply the municipal police with military-grade weapons, including FN Minimi machine guns, to match those used by criminals. Furthermore, he spent 50 million pesos (about US$2.6 million) on vehicles for the municipal police.

Additionally, Manzo stated that if he were killed, responsibility would lie with former municipal president Campos, whom he accused of being aligned with Leonel Godoy Rangel, governor of Michoacán from 2008 to 2012, and Raúl Morón Orozco, municipal president of Morelia between 2018 and 2021; Manzo had confrontations with them on several occasions.

==== Other areas management and popularity ====
Manzo established six free municipal pharmacies, in which some provide services through an attention-module system. Along with the state government, the municipal administration invested MX$130 million in road construction and maintenance.

His zero-tolerance strategy towards crime drew comparisons to Salvadoran president Nayib Bukele, even though he rejected the analogy. In a June 2025 Mitofsky poll assessing public perceptions of 150 mayors across the country, Manzo ranked 32nd in approval. Although he said that running for governor was not his priority, he was widely viewed as a potential contender in the 2027 state election. According to a Massive Caller poll released in September 2025, Manzo ranked third in voter preference. He criticized the result, noting that the firm had similarly placed him third in its polling during his mayoral nomination process.

== Assassination ==
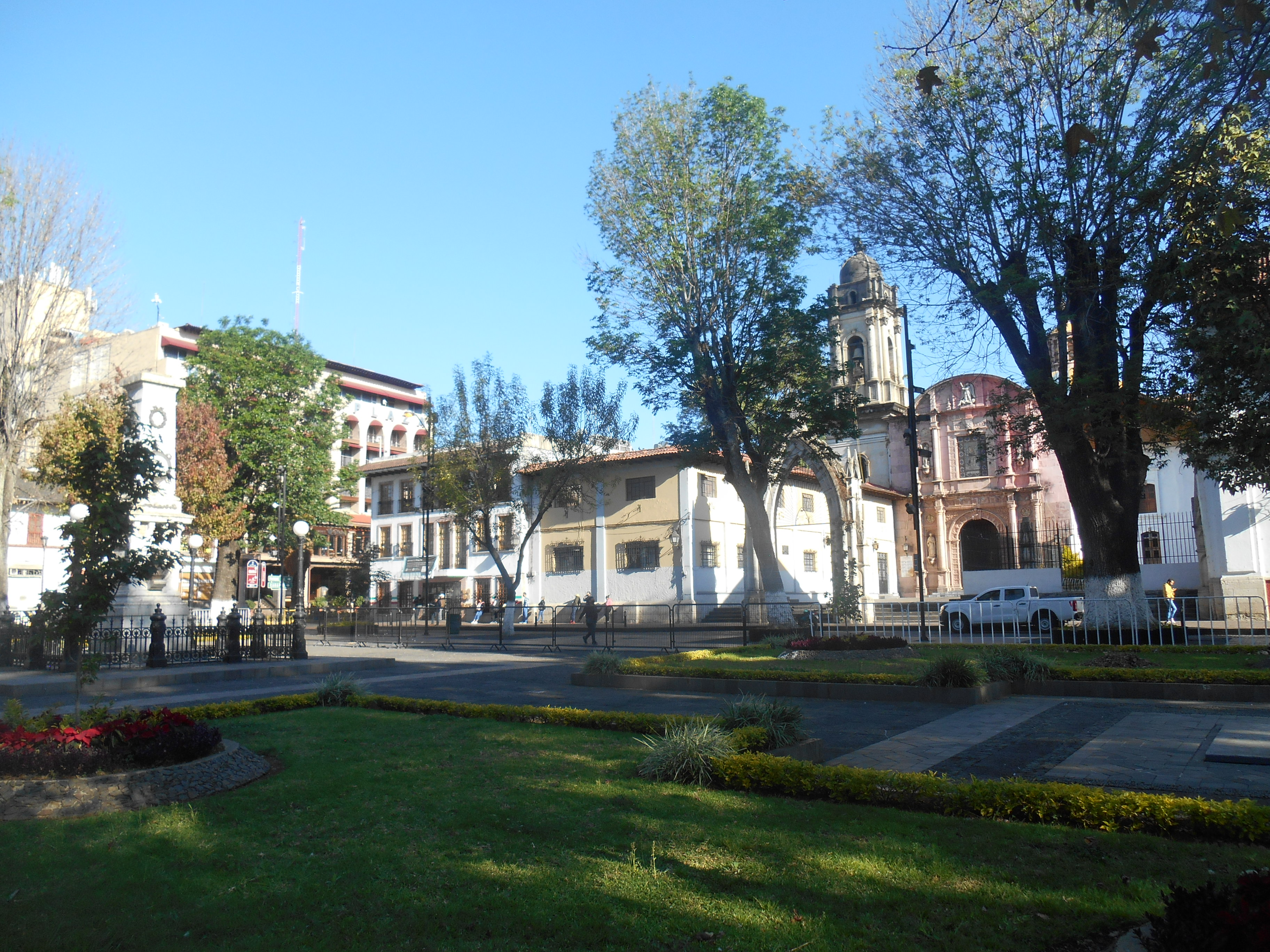
Plaza Mártires de Uruapan in 2020. Manzo was shot in the square.

On 1 November 2025, Manzo attended the Festival de las Velas, a traditional annual candle-lit Day of the Dead celebration, in central Uruapan. At approximately 8:10 p.m. CST (UTC−6), while he was with his family observing the festival decorations and speaking with residents, Manzo was shot seven times. Three of the bullets struck him in the back and abdomen, with the latter wound proving fatal. He was pronounced dead at a local hospital. He was 40 years old. Víctor Hugo de la Cruz, a member of the Uruapan municipal council, and a bodyguard were also injured in the attack.

=== Investigation ===
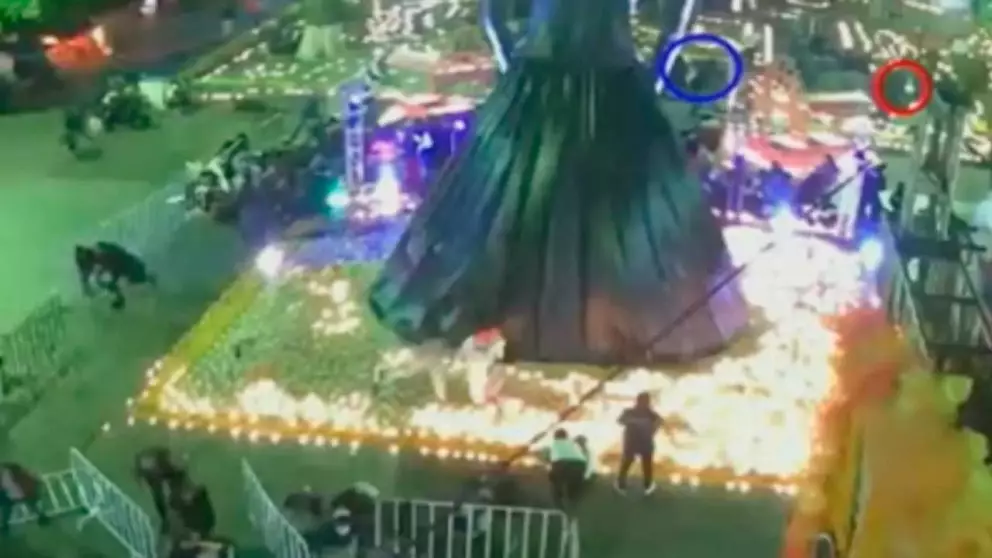
Closed-circuit television footage of the assassination. Manzo (circled in blue) lies on the ground while his security forces restrain the assailant (circled in red).

At a press conference the following day, federal public security secretary Omar García Harfuch reported that Manzo's assailant had been killed by the security forces and that two other arrests had been made. The weapon used in the attack, a 9mm Beretta pistol, was later linked to two other incidents that resulted in three deaths and two injuries. Harfuch also noted that Manzo had been under federal protection since December 2024 and that fourteen National Guard soldiers and two vehicles had been assigned to him in May 2025, to complement his security detail of trusted municipal police officers.

Manzo's killer was identified by the state attorney general on 6 November as Víctor Manuel Ubaldo Vidales, (Note: Other sources cite his name as Miguel Ángel Ubaldo Vidales.) a 17-year-old from Paracho, Michoacán. According to the state attorney general, the attacker was under the influence of methamphetamine and tetrahydrocannabinol, and had been reported missing from his home a week earlier. Investigators have suggested that the attack may indicate the emergence of suicide-style assassin operations, in which organized crime groups deploy assailants to carry out missions with little or no likelihood of survival, effectively rendering them suicide missions. Governor Ramírez Bedolla stated that two other alleged suspects, including a minor, were found dead on 14 November along Federal Highway 37 between Uruapan and Paracho; they were later identified as Fernando Josué "N" and Ramiro "N", who investigators said had been killed to obstruct the investigation.

García Harfuch reported that Jorge Armando, known as "El Licenciado", member of the Jalisco New Generation Cartel (CJNG), was arrested on 18 November. Authorities said he coordinated the surveillance of Manzo and ordered the attack, but acted on the orders of a higher-ranking cartel figure, whom Milenio identified as Ramón Álvarez Ayala, known as "R1". On 21 November, seven of the eight police officers serving in Manzo's security detail were arrested on suspicion of aggravated homicide by omission, the state attorney general's office alleging that they had failed to carry out their protection duties. The eighth officer remained at large, and the National Guard personnel who provided secondary protection were also placed under investigation. On 27 November, a judge ordered Jorge Armando "N" and the seven officers to stand trial and remanded them in pretrial detention; Jorge Armando "N" was charged with aggravated homicide and aggravated injury.

Two men were subsequently accused of the killings of Fernando Josué "N" and Ramiro "N". Alejandro Baruc "N", known as "El Kaoz", was arrested on 23 December 2025, and the arrest of Alan Benjamín "N", known as "El Taxista", was announced on 24 February 2026. Both were ordered to stand trial on 1 March 2026, prosecutors alleging that Alan Benjamín "N" had supplied the taxi used to transport the two men before their deaths.

In January 2026, García Harfuch announced the arrests of Samuel García Rivero, a former director of public relations and protocol in the Uruapan municipal government, and of Josué Elogio "N", a taxi driver known as "El Viejito". According to the security ministry, García Rivero passed information on Manzo's movements on 1 November—including the mayor's delays and the time he was to leave the Casa de la Cultura—to Josué Elogio "N" through a WhatsApp group used to coordinate the attack. Gerardo "N", known as "El Congo", described by prosecutors as the CJNG's plaza boss in Uruapan and a subordinate of "El Licenciado", was arrested in Apatzingán on 2 March 2026.

In May 2026, state attorney general Carlos Torres Piña announced the arrest in Uruapan of Wendy Fabiola "N", known as "La Tía", who was described as the information link between the criminal cell and Gerardo "N". Her arrest led to the detention of Héctor Hugo "N", a former employee of the regional prosecutor's office in Uruapan, and of Juan Luis "N", an officer of the state Guardia Civil, who were accused of leaking arrest warrants, details of security operations and photographs of firearms.

On 30 July 2026, García Harfuch announced the arrest of the alleged mastermind behind the assassination, Ramón Álvarez Ayala, alias "R1", whom authorities identified as the leader of Los Rs, a CJNG-linked criminal cell operating in Apatzingán, Morelia, Uruapan, and parts of Jalisco. He was detained by personnel of the Secretariat of Security and Civilian Protection and by army special forces. Álvarez Ayala is also suspect of the killing of Valeria Márquez, whose son was allegedly having a relationship with her and asked his father to kill her.

=== Government response ===
City trustee Hilda Flor del Campo Maldonado Medina was named as Manzo's interim successor, while his supporters called for his widow, Grecia Quiroz, to be appointed to complete his term in office. Governor Ramírez Bedolla confirmed that Manzo's replacement would be determined by his own independent movement, and a formal proposal to that effect was lodged with the state congress. Quiroz was sworn in as municipal president on 5 November 2025, to serve out the remainder of her husband's term. She vowed to carry on his stance against organized crime.

Quiroz met with President Sheinbaum at the National Palace in Mexico City on 3 November. The following day, Sheinbaum announced the "Michoacán Plan for Peace and Justice", a security plan for the state including the deployment of the National Guard, more federal personnel, and the creation of a special unit at the state prosecutor's office. The plan covers three broad thematic areas: security and justice, economic development with justice, and education and culture for peace. Meetings with the federal security cabinet would be held every two weeks, and an alert system for the state's mayors would be put in place.

=== Public reactions ===
Manzo was the seventh municipal president to be killed in Michoacán during the governorship of Ramírez Bedolla – a member of Morena elected to a six-year term in 2021 – and the country's sixth municipal president killed in 2025.

At Manzo's funeral in Uruapan on 2 November, Governor Ramírez Bedolla was received with indignation by a crowd of hundreds of townspeople. Members of the public called him a murderer and demanded justice for the mayor's assassination. The governor's security personnel advised him to withdraw after less than five minutes at the funeral home; Proceso also reported that Grecia Quiroz, Manzo's widow, had allegedly asked him to leave. Thousands of people marched through the streets of Uruapan to accompany Manzo's body to its final resting place. Addressing the crowd at the city's main square, Quiroz called on them to continue defending their country "with tooth and nail".

Residents of Uruapan began collecting keys to be melted down into a statue honoring Manzo. A TikToker released a corrido in his memory, and the group Banda Perla considered renaming their song "Ilusión 98" after him, as it was one of his favorites.

==== Protests ====
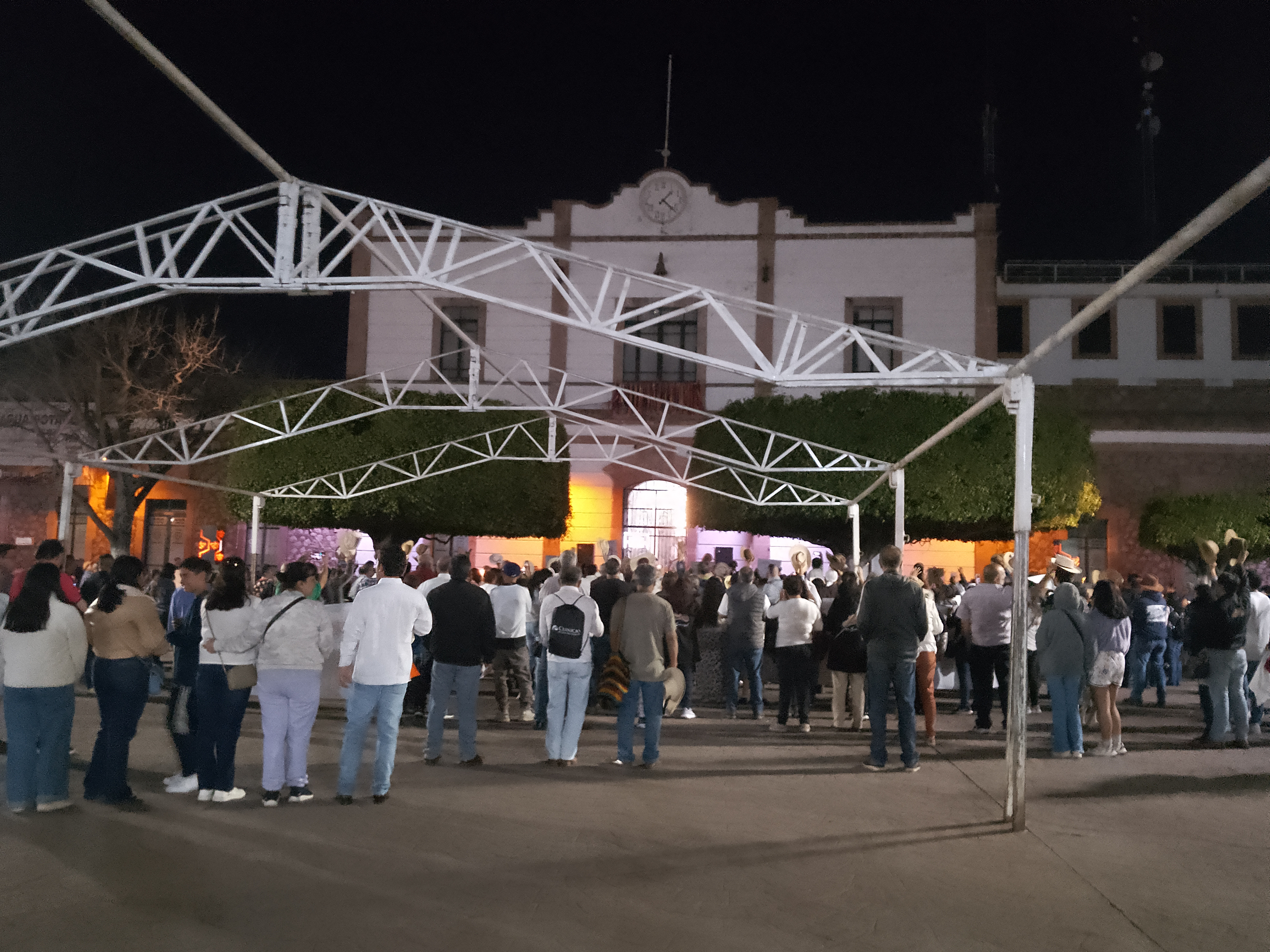
A demonstration in Zitácuaro, Michoacán, on 15 November

A protest march was organized in Morelia, the capital of Michoacán, on 2 November, following anonymous social media calls the night before urging participants to gather at Plaza Jardín Morelos wearing white. An estimated 3,000 people marched through the historic center, chanting slogans such as "Justice for Manzo", "Enough with all this crime", and "Claudia didn't listen and the government killed him". Later, a contingent – "numbering in the hundreds" – stormed the state government palace. Armed with molotov cocktails, sticks, and stones, the protesters forced the building's main entrance and gained access to the government offices inside. They set fire to some of the furniture, threw other pieces down to the street below, and daubed slogans on the interior and exterior walls. The police deployed tear gas inside the complex to disperse the protesters, and the building was placed under police guard; eight people were arrested.

A second march in Morelia was organized by students on 3 November, during which a law student was injured in the eye by a rubber bullet. Additional demonstrations took place in the Michoacán municipalities of Pátzcuaro, Zitácuaro and Apatzingán, with additional complaints condemning the killing of Bernardo Bravo two weeks earlier. In Apatzingán, the state's fourth largest city, protesters forced their way into the municipal palace and set furniture on fire. Grecia Quiroz urged people to avoid violent demonstrations, saying it was not what her husband would have wanted.

A march demanding security and justice – attended, according to the local authorities, by between 70,000 and 80,000 people – was held in Uruapan on 7 November. It was headed by Manzo's grandmother. She said that although she feared for his life, he had told her, "I have to save Uruapan. I love it because it's my home. I adore its people". During the demonstration, participants called for the suspension of government and business activities.

Social media users organized a nationwide protest for 15 November, with marches held in over 50 cities, including Mexico City. Over 120 people, including 100 police officers, were injured at the Mexico City rally, and 47 people were arrested in Guadalajara. Protestors cited government corruption, the failure to curb cartel violence, and Sheinbaum's socialist political background as their reasons for mobilizing. A common chant at these protests was, "Carlos did not die, the government killed him," underscoring their belief that government corruption is intertwined with cartel influence and the wave of political assassinations occurring under the administration.

== Legacy ==
Quiroz unveiled a bronze statue of Manzo on the first anniversary of his death, in the square where he was murdered.

== See also ==
- List of politicians killed during the presidency of Claudia Sheinbaum
- Homero Gómez González – manager of El Rosario Monarch Butterfly Preserve in Michoacán, killed in 2020
- Hipólito Mora – founder of a vigilante self-defense group in Michoacán in response to cartel activity, killed in 2023
