= Same-sex marriage in Michoacán =

Same-sex marriage has been legal in Michoacán since 23 June 2016. On 18 May 2016, the Congress of Michoacán passed a bill to legalise same-sex marriage by a vote of 27–0 with 8 abstentions, which was later signed into law by Governor Silvano Aureoles Conejo. The law was published in the state's official journal on 22 June, and took effect the following day. Michoacán was the eighth Mexican state to legalize same-sex marriage.

Previously, in an effort to delay the legalization of same-sex marriage, Congress had enacted domestic partnerships granting some of the rights and benefits of marriage in September 2015.

== Domestic partnerships ==
In November 2006, media outlets reported that several civil union bills would be introduced to the Congress of Michoacán. A bill was introduced in 2007, but it stalled and was not voted on. After same-sex marriage was legalized in Mexico City in 2010, the Party of the Democratic Revolution (PRD) announced it would propose bills for same-sex marriage and adoption by same-sex couples, along with a "law for coexistence partnerships". A bill was submitted in March 2010 by the De Facto Group for Sexual Diversity in Michoacán (Grupo de Facto Diversidad Sexual en Michoacán), which proposed both marriage and cohabitation, but did not mention adoption rights. As with the previous proposals, it stalled.

On 27 August 2015, the Justice and Human Rights Committee approved a new Family Code (Código Familiar) that maintained the heterosexual definition of marriage, but enacted domestic partnerships (Spanish: sociedad de convivencia, pronounced [sosjeˈðað ðe kombiˈβensja]) for same-sex couples. It was approved unanimously by Congress in a 34–0 vote on 7 September 2015. The law was published in the state's official journal on 30 September. The following month, the State Human Rights Commission filed an action of unconstitutionality (accion de inconstitucionalidad; docketed 107/2015), contesting the constitutionality of the new domestic partnership law. It argued that providing only partnerships to same-sex couples and marriage to opposite-sex couples was discriminatory and violated Articles 1 and 4 of the Constitution of Mexico. The lawsuit was mooted due to the state's legalization of same-sex marriage in May 2016. As a result, the Supreme Court of Justice of the Nation voted unanimously to dismiss the challenge on 18 June 2018.

Although previously only available to same-sex couples, domestic partnerships were opened to opposite-sex couples on 23 June 2016.

== Same-sex marriage ==
=== Background ===
After four years of legal process, a federal court ruled on 5 March 2014 that the state government had unfairly discriminated against a lesbian couple, Alejandra Banderas Rosales and Claudia López Ramos, by refusing to issue them a marriage license. The court ordered the local civil registrar to perform the marriage. The couple married in Morelia on 12 March 2014, marking the first same-sex marriage in Michoacán. On 6 May 2014, media outlets reported that a second lesbian couple, Elizabeth Cervantes Guerrero and Cecilia González Villanueva, had obtained an amparo, and seven more cases were pending. The couple married on 16 May, and on 15 August applied to register the birth of their twin children, which had also been approved by amparo. Subsequently, the De Facto Group for Sexual Diversity in Michoacán announced that it planned to file a collective amparo in September 2014. Around the same time, a couple who had married in Mexico City initiated the first adoption process in the state.

The Supreme Court of Justice of the Nation ruled on 12 June 2015 that state bans on same-sex marriage are unconstitutional nationwide. The court's ruling is considered a "jurisprudential thesis" and did not invalidate state laws, meaning that same-sex couples denied the right to marry would still have to seek individual amparos in court. The ruling standardized the procedures for judges and courts throughout Mexico to approve all applications for same-sex marriages and made the approval mandatory. Specifically, the court ruled that bans on same-sex marriage violate Articles 1 and 4 of the Constitution of Mexico. Article 1 of the Constitution states:

Any form of discrimination, based on ethnic or national origin, gender, age, disabilities, social status, medical conditions, religion, opinions, sexual orientation, marital status, or any other form, which violates the human dignity or seeks to annul or diminish the rights and freedoms of the people, is prohibited. (Note: In some official and indigenous languages of Michoacán: Spanish: Queda prohibida toda discriminación motivada por origen étnico o nacional, el género, la edad, las discapacidades, la condición social, las condiciones de salud, la religión, las opiniones, las preferencias sexuales, el estado civil o cualquier otra que atente contra la dignidad humana y tenga por objeto anular o menoscabar los derechos y libertades de las personas.; Purépecha: Nóne ma úati kéntitanhani ka no sési arhinani o no sési kánani jimpoki ma máteru mimixekwa jatsiska, ixu o máteru ísï anapu, achaatini o warhiitini, sánku jatirini o t’arhepitiini, no úni sési xanharani, wantani o máteru p’amenchakwa jimpo; kánekwa ampe jatsikorheni o no ampe kánkorheni; p’amenchatieni, máteru jakak’úkwa kámani, ménterueni eratseni, ka máteru ampe jimpo nóne úati no sési kanhani ka jimpoka juramukweecha kwa’peatiksï.)

A third lesbian couple obtained an amparo in June 2015. On 29 June, a spokesperson for the state civil registry stated that they had formalized six same-sex unions in the previous year. On 10 July, a judge from the Seventh District Court granted another amparo to a same-sex couple, and ordered the state government to revise the laws regarding marriage, or face penalties. The ruling gave Congress until 15 July to make the necessary legal changes, with the plaintiff couple's attorneys arguing that the state would be held liable if it failed to repeal the discriminatory provisions of the Family Code in accordance with the court order. When questioned by the media on 14 July, Governor Salvador Jara Guerrero declared that the changes would be applied on 15 July and was quoted as saying "Of course!" to removing the heterosexual definition of marriage in state law. By 31 July, an additional nineteen amparos had been granted to same-sex couples in Michoacán. In making the announcement, deputies Talía Vázquez Alatorre and Cristina Portillo Ayala regretted that Congress had yet to act, but hoped that these further amparos would emphasize the need for change.

=== Legislative action ===
Previously, the Family Code banned same-sex marriages; article 123 defined marriage as the "union of a man and a woman", and article 125 described marriage as an institution whose goal was "perpetuating the species". Numerous state and federal judges had declared the two articles unconstitutional, and granted individual same-sex couples the right to marry through the recurso de amparo process. On 18 May 2016, the Congress of Michoacán approved a same-sex marriage bill by 27 votes to 0 with 8 abstentions. This had followed previous attempts to pass a domestic partnership law instead of a same-sex marriage law as required by a judicial ruling in July 2015. The law was published in the state's official journal on 22 June, following Governor Silvano Aureoles Conejo's signature, and came into effect the following day. It ensures that married same-sex couples enjoy the same rights, benefits and responsibilities as married opposite-sex couples, including tax benefits, immigration rights, property rights, inheritance, and adoption rights, among others. Article 127 of the Family Code now reads: Marriage is the lawful union of two persons for the purpose of establishing a permanent community of life, in which respect, equality, and mutual support are fostered. (Note: Spanish: El matrimonio es la unión legítima de dos personas para realizar una comunidad de vida permanente, en la que se procuren respeto, igualdad y ayuda mutua.)

18 May 2016 vote in the Congress
Party	Voted for	Voted against	Abstained	Absent (Did not vote)
Institutional Revolutionary Party	12: Yarabí Ávila González; Eloisa Berber Zermeño; Adriana Campos Huirache; Rosa de la Torre Torres; Juan Figueroa Ceja; Adriana Hernández Iñiguez; Wilfrido Lázaro Medina; Roberto López García; Mario Mendoza González; Sergio Ochoa Vázquez; Socorro Quintana León; Xóchitl Ruiz González	–	1: Rosalia Miranda Arévalo	2: Raymundo Arreola Ortega; Roberto Maldonado Hinojosa
Party of the Democratic Revolution	9: José Aguilera Rojas; Jéovana Alcántar Baca; Ángel Cedillo Hernández; Juan Corona Martínez; José Hinojosa Campa; Manuel López Meléndez; Nayelli Pedraza Huerta; Juan Puebla Arévalo; Pascual Sigala Páez	–	–	3: Francisco Campos Ruiz; Belinda Iturbide Díaz; Raúl Prieto Gómez
National Action Party	–	–	7: Macarena Chávez Flores; Eduardo García Chavira; Héctor Gómez Trujillo; Alma González Sánchez; Carlos Quintana Martínez; Andrea Villanueva Cano; Miguel Villegas Soto	–
Ecologist Green Party of Mexico	2: Ernesto Núñez Aguilar; Juanita Ramírez Bravo	–	–	–
Labor Party	2: Mary Bernal Martínez; Brenda Fraga Gutiérrez	–	–	–
Citizens' Movement	1: José Moncada Sánchez	–	–	–
National Regeneration Movement	1: Enrique Zepeda Ontiveros	–	–	–
Total	27	0	8	5
Total	67.5%	0.0%	20.0%	12.5%

=== Statistics ===
The following table shows the number of same-sex marriages performed in Michoacán since legalization in 2016 as reported by the National Institute of Statistics and Geography. Between June 2016 and May 2017, 86 same-sex marriages were performed in Michoacán, with most taking place in Morelia, followed by Uruapan, Zamora, Apatzingán, La Piedad, Lázaro Cárdenas, Pátzcuaro and Puruándiro. Additionally, the state civil registry began training its employees to recognize that same-sex marriage is legal in Michoacán, as reports indicated that several same-sex couples had been turned away when applying for marriage licenses. Figures for 2020 are lower than previous years because of the restrictions in place due to the COVID-19 pandemic. The state civil registry estimated that 598 same-sex marriages had been performed in Michoacán by the end of 2020.

Number of marriages performed in Michoacán
Year	Same-sex			Opposite-sex	Total	% same-sex
Year	Female	Male	Total	Opposite-sex	Total	% same-sex
2016	34	21	55	22,648	22,703	0.24%
2017	62	39	101	22,516	22,617	0.45%
2018	86	50	136	20,499	20,635	0.66%
2019	108	70	178	20,966	21,144	0.84%
2020	30	24	54	10,831	10,885	0.50%
2021	110	47	157	18,525	18,682	0.84%
2022	209	99	308	20,237	20,545	1.50%
2023	185	104	289	20,584	20,873	1.38%
2024	180	98	278	19,341	19,619	1.42%

The first same-sex marriage for a Purépecha same-sex couple was performed in Ihuatzio on 12 February 2022. There was no vocal objection from the inhabitants of the community, and the couple said they "were proud of [their] people, because being in a small community and having large families, where we all know each other, there was not, thank God, a negative response".

== Public opinion ==
A 2017 opinion poll conducted by Strategic Communication Office (Gabinete de Comunicación Estratégica) found that 48% of Michoacán residents supported same-sex marriage, while 49% were opposed. According to a 2018 survey by the National Institute of Statistics and Geography, 46% of the Michoacán public opposed same-sex marriage.

== See also ==
- Same-sex marriage in Mexico
- LGBT rights in Mexico
