= 2025 Mexican protests =

Anti-corruption protests against Mexican government

- Part of Mexican drug war and Gen Z protests
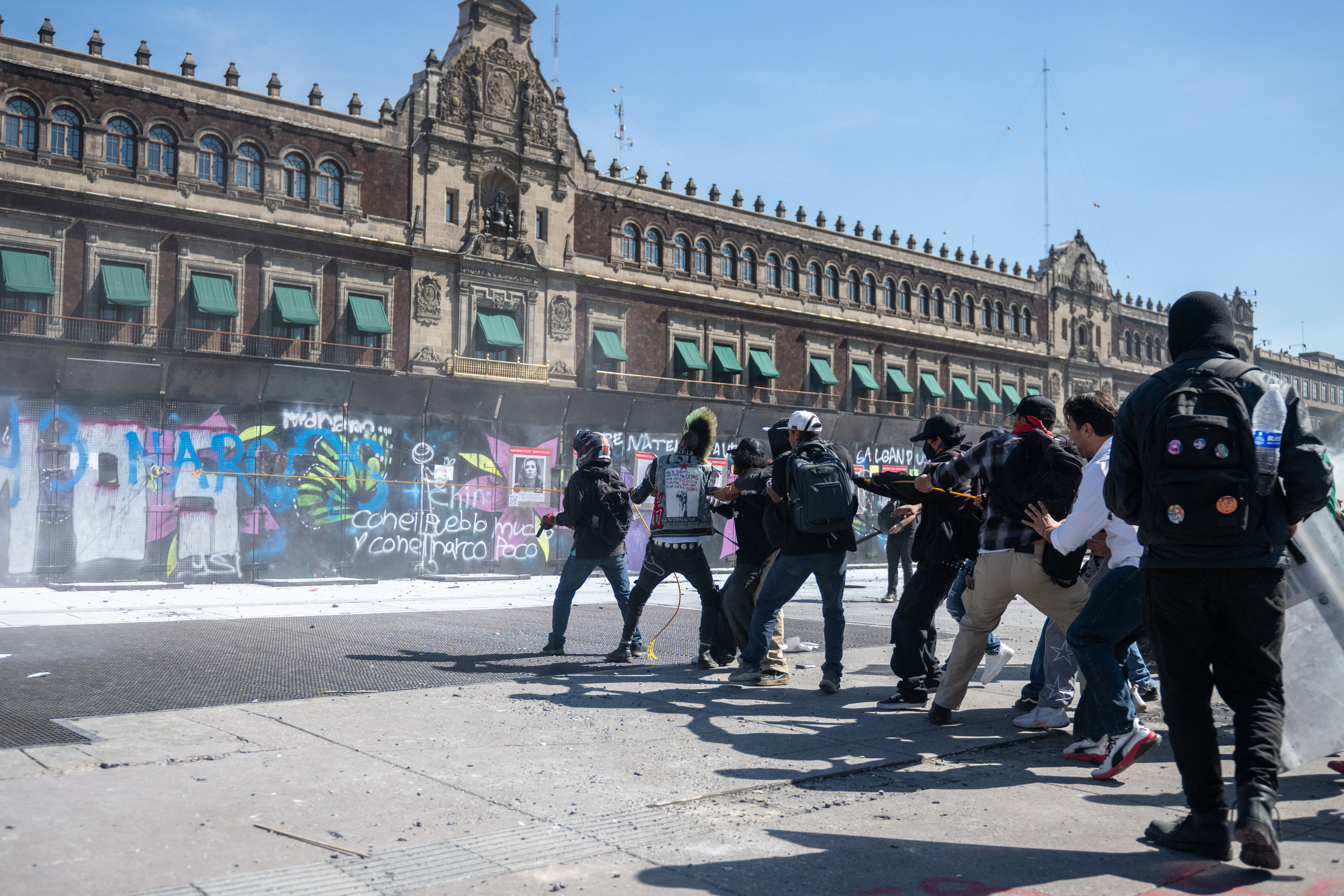
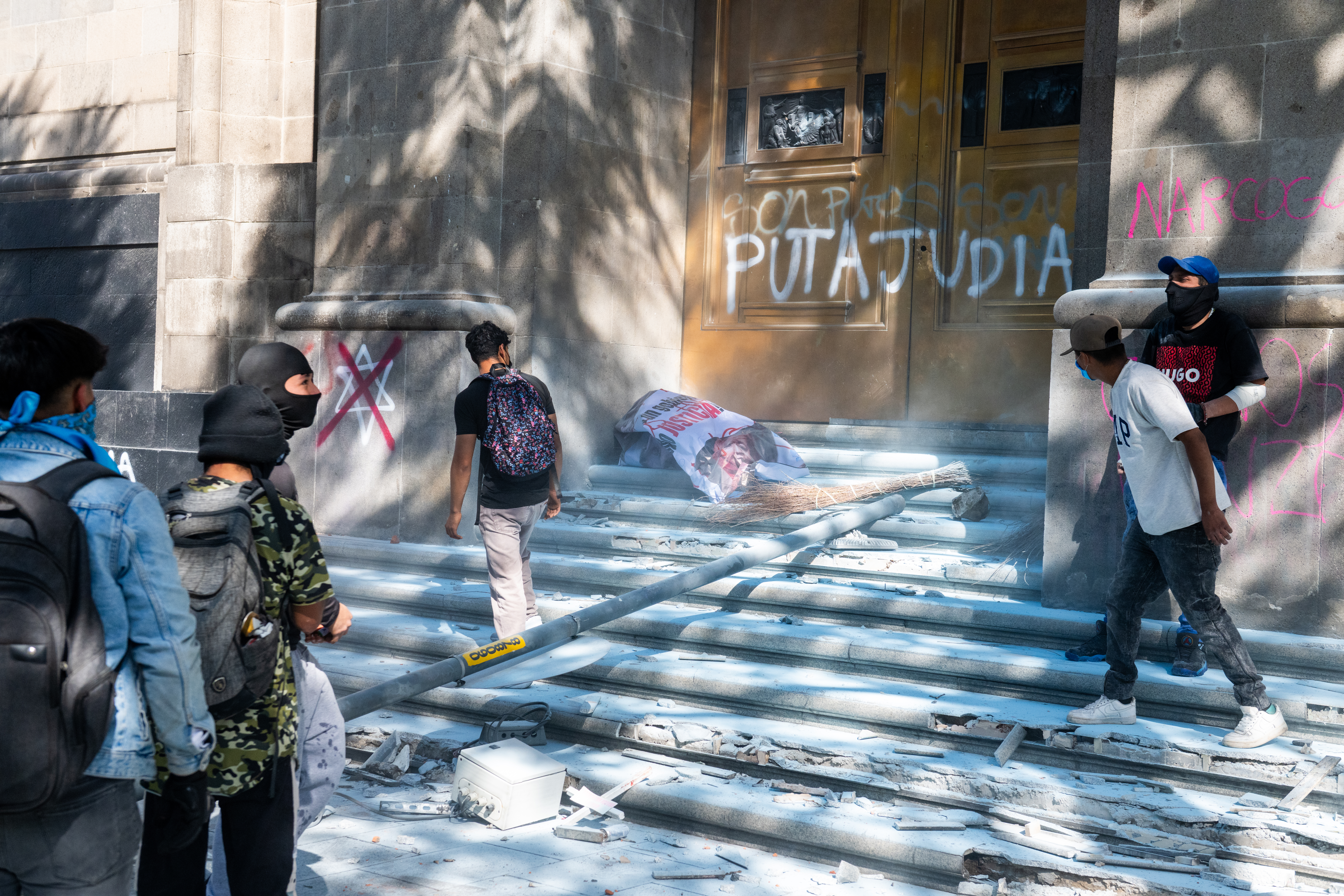
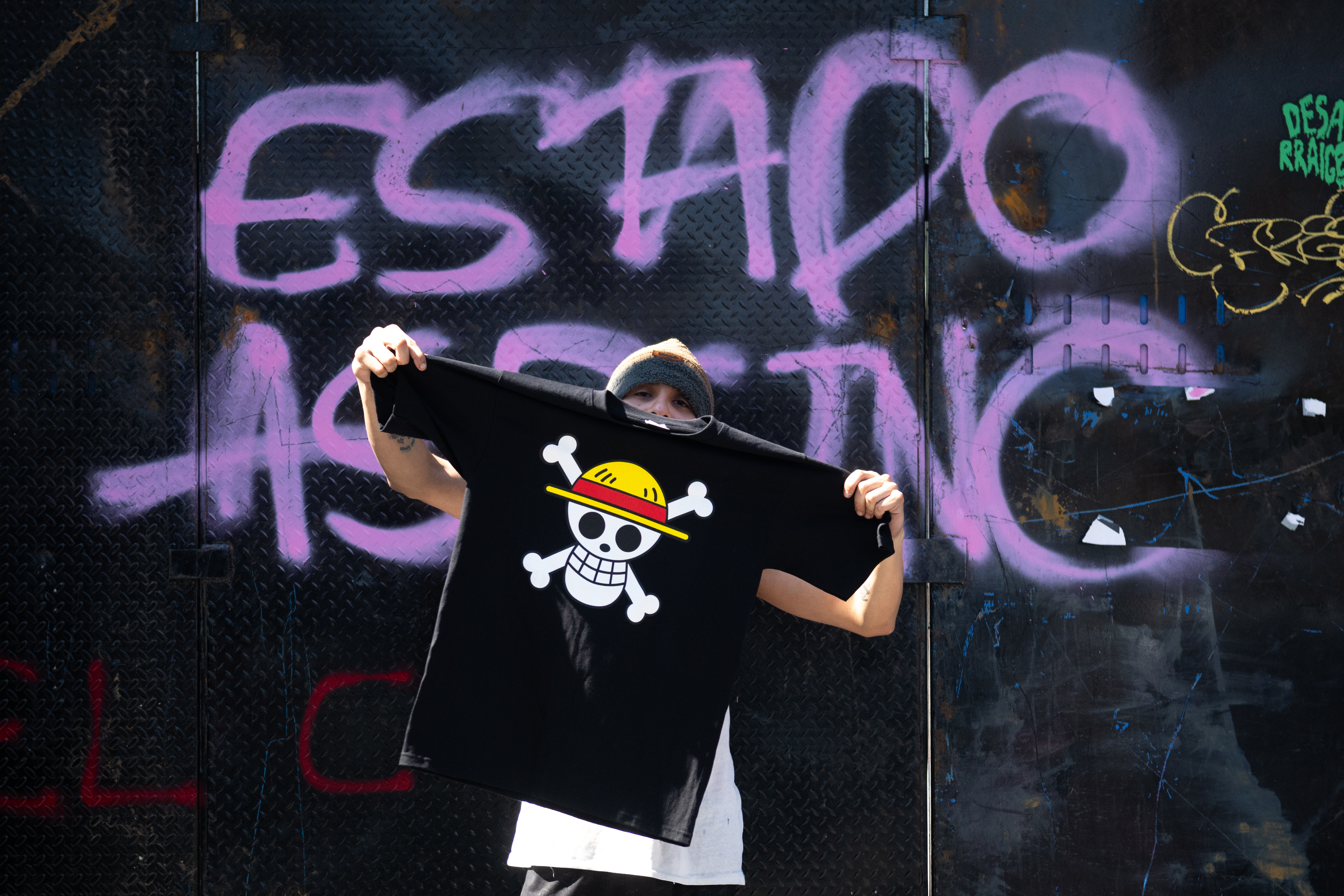
- Clockwise from top: Protesters attempt to tear down the fences surrounding the National Palace, Mexico City; A demonstrator holds up a t-shirt featuring the Straw Hat Pirates' Jolly Roger emblem; Protesters vandalize the headquarters of the SCJN
- Date: 15 November 2025; 20 November 2025; 14 December 2025
- Location: Mexico
- Caused by: Assassination of Uruapan Mayor Carlos Manzo; Failure of federal government to address cartel violence; Government corruption
- Goals: Resignation of Claudia Sheinbaum
- Result: Protests ended; Sheinbaum remained in office

Parties
(Mexico) Protesters: Loosely organized right-wing sympathizers; Supported by: National Action Party; Institutional Revolutionary Party; Unorganized anti-Sheinbaum Manzo supporters	Government of Mexico; Secretariat of the Interior; Government of Mexico City; Mexico City Police; Supported by: National Regeneration Movement

Lead figures
No centralized leadership	Claudia Sheinbaum

Casualties
- Injuries: 33 civilians (Note: 20 in Mexico City and 13 in Guadalajara on 15 November 2025); 103 police officers, including 40 hospitalized (Note: 100 in Mexico City and 3 in Guadalajara on 15 November 2025)
- Arrested: 64 (Note: 20 in Mexico City and 44 in Guadalajara on 15 November 2025)

In November and December 2025, a series of anti-government demonstrations was held across Mexico following the assassination of Uruapan mayor Carlos Manzo. The protests expressed dissatisfaction with the administration of President Claudia Sheinbaum, particularly over the federal response to drug-related violence and alleged official negligence.

The largest demonstration, on 15 November, drew about 17,000 people in Mexico City; a black bloc of roughly 1,000 masked protesters tore down barriers outside the National Palace, triggering clashes in which riot police used tear gas and stun grenades. More than a hundred people were injured, most of them police officers, a government building was attacked in Guadalajara, and 64 people were arrested in the two cities. Two further marches in Mexico City, on 20 November and 14 December, drew a few hundred participants each as turnout fell sharply. The authenticity of the protests' origins has been questioned by the government and some international media.

== Background ==
=== Cartel violence ===
Since the launch of the Mexican drug war in 2006 under Felipe Calderón, the country has experienced sustained escalation in cartel-related violence and insecurity. Subsequent federal administrations continued to confront organized crime, though with differing strategies. During the presidency of Andrés Manuel López Obrador, the security approach known as "abrazos, no balazos" (lit. 'hugs, not bullets') sought to reduce violence through social programs and limited use of force; however, although the homicide rate declined, the total number of deaths exceeded those recorded under any previous administration.

During the administration of Claudia Sheinbaum, the government adopted a more hard-handed approach toward organized crime, intensifying high-profile arrests, drug seizures, and military operations against cartels, which marked a shift from the previous administration's approach. While the administration reported a 25 percent decrease in homicides nationwide in the first months of 2025 compared to the previous year, other forms of criminal activity, such as extortion and number of disappearances, have increased. High-profile cases of disappearances, continued discoveries of clandestine sites, and localized surges in cartel violence have remained sources of public concern.

In 2020, federal states such as Guanajuato, Zacatecas, Michoacán, Jalisco, and Querétaro were regarded as the most violent states in Mexico. In 2023, Mexico recorded 23.3 murders per 100,000 inhabitants.

=== Assassination of Carlos Manzo ===
On 1 November, Uruapan Mayor Carlos Manzo was fatally shot while attending the Festival de las Velas in the municipality. He was struck seven times and pronounced dead shortly after being taken to a hospital. Manzo, who had taken office earlier in 2024, had positioned himself as a vocal critic of the federal government's security strategy under President Claudia Sheinbaum and had publicly adopted a zero-tolerance stance toward organized crime in Uruapan. His assassination intensified concerns about escalating violence in Michoacán and the targeting of local officials by criminal groups.

==== Carlos Manzo protests ====
Following Manzo's assassination, Michoacán experienced a surge of public unrest marked by consecutive protests across the state. On 2 November, thousands marched in Morelia, where a faction of demonstrators forced their way into the state government palace, leading to property damage, clashes with police, and several arrests. Student-led protests followed the next day, resulting in at least one serious injury. Additional demonstrations spread to municipalities such as Pátzcuaro, Zitácuaro, and Apatzingán, where protesters also stormed local government buildings. The wave of mobilization culminated in a massive march in Uruapan on 7 November, attended by between 70,000 and 80,000 people demanding greater security and justice.

=== Organizers and participating groups ===
The movement was primarily organized by a group calling itself "Generación Z Mexico". Self-described as a "civic and non-partisan" youth movement, the group began operations on social media in October 2025. The group advocated for a nationwide march on 15 November, with its messaging centering on calling for a recall referendum for President Claudia Sheinbaum, the autonomy of electoral institutions, and the elimination of organized crime's influence on elections. The campaign was characterized by AI-generated imagery, anti-government slogans, and outreach aimed primarily at users aged 15 to 20. Organizers encouraged attendees to display the Straw Hat Pirates' Jolly Roger from the anime One Piece as a symbol of resistance against authoritarianism.

Following the assassination of Carlos Manzo on 1 November, Generación Z Mexico shifted its messaging ahead of the 15 November demonstrations, increasingly framing the mobilization around public insecurity and the government's responsibility for rising crime. Media coverage of the killing amplified public attention, giving the planned demonstrations wider national visibility.

==== Demands ====
On 14 November, the group released a 12-point list of demands. The demands focused on electoral integrity, judicial independence, and security reform.

- Recall and electoral reform: The first four points focused on establishing citizen-initiated recall mechanisms to remove the president from office, with replacements elected through direct citizen vote without partisan or Congressional interference. These points also called for protections against vote buying with independent oversight of social programs.
- Transparency and auditing: Points five through seven called for creating independent citizen organizations for transparency and auditing, with authority to compel government publication of budget and program information, along with comprehensive judicial reform through a Citizen Council.
- Representation and security: The remaining points proposed restructuring Congressional representation to include regions and indigenous peoples, and demilitarizing internal security while strengthening local forces with citizen oversight.
- Citizen inclusion: The final points emphasized integrating voices with "moral authority" into citizen councils, and opening public consultation to potentially expand the demands to 15 points.

== Protests ==
=== 15 November ===
People demonstrating in Zitácuaro, Michoacán on 15 November

Various demonstrations were held in cities across the country. In Mexico City, where the largest march took place, authorities estimated that approximately 17,000 people participated. Turnout in other states included between 10,000 and 20,000 protesters in Jalisco, around 4,000 in Nuevo León and Michoacán; 5,000 in Aguascalientes; and more than 1,000 in Chihuahua, Chiapas, and Oaxaca. In the remaining states attendance generally remained below 1,000 participants.

Observers and journalists noted a visibly low turnout of young people at the events. In some states, the crowds were predominantly composed of older adults, and the marches saw the attendance of opposition politicians, including Emilio Álvarez Icaza, Fernando Belaunzarán, and Guadalupe Acosta Naranjo.

In Mexico City, protesters marched from the Angel of Independence monument along Paseo de la Reforma through several streets and avenues before reaching the Zócalo. The march began at approximately 11:00 AM CST and proceeded peacefully for several hours. Tensions escalated when the demonstration reached the Zócalo in the afternoon, as a black bloc group of approximately 1,000 masked individuals dismantled metal barriers that had been installed in front of the National Palace. Protesters attacked police with stones, fireworks, sticks, chains, and hammers, while riot police responded with tear gas and stun grenades. The clashes resulted in 120 people injured, including 100 police officers, 40 of whom required hospital treatment.

In Guadalajara, Jalisco, the march began at the Monumento a los Niños Héroes and proceeded peacefully through the city center, with participants chanting against the Morena party and the federal government. At around 4:20 PM CST, a masked contingent separated from the main demonstration and attempted to force entry into the Jalisco Government Palace, damaging entrance doors, breaking windows along the façade, and attempting to set fires. Additional damage was reported at the State Congress building and nearby public infrastructure. State police deployed riot-control units, established security perimeters around government buildings, and used tear gas to disperse protesters, who threw stones and other projectiles in response.

In the aftermath of the clashes, authorities processed dozens of detainees on a range of charges. In Mexico City, about 20 people were arrested, with prosecutors pursuing cases for attempted homicide, robbery, and assaults on police officers; some detainees were released for lack of evidence, while others were placed in preventive custody at the Reclusorio Norte. In Guadalajara, police detained 44 individuals linked to the unrest at the Government Palace, mostly on charges of vandalism and property damage.

=== 20 November ===
On 20 November, a demonstration of approximately 200 participants was held in Mexico City on Revolution Day, coinciding with the government's annual commemorative parade. The march, which drew low participation and consisted mainly of adults and older individuals, followed the same route as the 15 November protest, beginning at the Angel of Independence at around 11:00 AM CST and proceeding toward the Zócalo to demand "a Mexico without drug cartels." In response to the announced mobilization, the government stated it would shorten the parade's route. Although organizers had also called for a gathering at Ciudad Universitaria, no attendees assembled at that location.

Upon reaching the Glorieta de las Mujeres que Luchan, marchers were stopped by police, who blocked the route due to the ongoing parade; the blockade lasted until 1:30 PM CST. The group was halted again at the Zócalo perimeter, with authorities citing post-parade cleanup operations. The demonstration dispersed at around 3:00 PM CST.

=== 14 December ===
On 14 December, a demonstration dubbed as the "Marcha del Silencio" (lit. 'March of Silence') was held in Mexico City, during which participants were expected to march without slogans or chants. The demonstration drew limited participation, with approximately 300 demonstrators, and the route was shortened to exclude the Zócalo, concluding at the Palacio de Bellas Artes due to a Christmas market being held in the square. Upon arriving at the Palacio de Bellas Artes, the march split into two groups: one contingent remained at the Palacio de Bellas Artes in keeping with the non-political character of the demonstration, while another, composed mostly of older adults who had been chanting anti-government slogans, proceeded toward the Zócalo before dispersing prior to reaching the square. Planned mobilizations in other states, including Morelos, Michoacán, and Jalisco, were cancelled or rescheduled due to low participation.

== Controversies ==
=== Authenticity allegations ===
The Mexican government claimed that the movement was not a grassroots youth uprising, but rather a coordinated digital campaign with significant outside backing. According to the government's "Infodemia" unit, more than MX$90 million were spent on social media operations over approximately a month and a half. Authorities specifically linked the Atlas Network, a U.S. based non-profit associated with libertarian think tanks, to the campaign. In its analysis, Infodemia reported 179 TikTok accounts promoting the march, of which about 50 were created between October and November. They also identified 359 Facebook groups amplifying the movement, including at least 28 pages administered from foreign countries.

Some social media users claimed protestors were using AI photos to increase crowd size perceptions.

==== Exhibition of influencers and privacy concerns ====
On 13 November, Sheinbaum named several content creators during her morning press conference in an effort to link influencers to the opposition. Following this exposure, several creators reported receiving death threats and held the president responsible for their safety. On 18 November, Morena president Luisa María Alcalde Luján published a contract stating that influencer Edson Andrade, who had promoted the 15 November protest, had been hired by the National Action Party (PAN) for digital strategy services; however, the document included unredacted sensitive personal information, such as Andrade's home address and tax identification number. Following this doxing, Andrade reported receiving severe threats and announced his decision to flee the country to ensure his safety.

== Responses ==
=== National ===
==== Sheinbaum administration ====
Prior to the 15 November mobilization, the government focused on discrediting the "Gen Z" narrative, with Sheinbaum and the government's "Infodemia" unit alleging the protests were a bot-driven campaign funded by foreign interests and political adversaries. On 15 November, while attending an event in Tabasco, Sheinbaum condemned the violence reported during the protests, stating that dissent should be expressed peacefully, that "violence should never be used" as a form of demonstration, and urged that any mobilizations remain non-violent. Days later, Sheinbaum argued that the demonstrations were not primarily led by Generation Z and blamed the right-wing opposition for hijacking the protests, linking the mobilization to previous anti-government movements such as the Marea Rosa, which had backed opposition candidate Xóchitl Gálvez in 2024. Sheinbaum used her 20 November Revolution Day address to contrast the "hate" of her detractors with her administration's stability, asserting that "violence is not the path", while defending the heavy security measures as a necessary stand against provocation.

==== Politicians ====
National Action Party (PAN) President Jorge Romero Herrera praised the mobilization as "pure hope," asserting that the youth "will no longer accept living in fear" and characterizing the Sheinbaum administration's response as "state violence." Romero strongly criticized the use of riot police and tear gas, arguing that the government's heavy-handed tactics were proof of its fear of a generation that "has finally woken up." Similarly, Alejandro Moreno, leader of the Institutional Revolutionary Party (PRI), criticized the administration's response to the protests, describing it as "authoritarian" and "brutal." He referred to the federal government as a "narco-government" and alleged that students had been "brutally attacked by the state with riot police." Billionaire Ricardo Salinas Pliego, a vocal critic of the administration, described Sheinbaum's government as "deaf, blind, and intolerant." Former President Vicente Fox framed the march as a "great homage" to Manzo.

==== Public opinion ====
A 19–20 November poll conducted by De las Heras Demotecnia found that 33% of respondents attributed the organization of the march to the opposition bloc "Marea Rosa", while 26% believed it was organized by youth participants; 36% said they did not know who organized it. Regarding the violence, 51% held demonstrators primarily responsible, compared with 21% who blamed the police, and 62% believed the disturbances were provoked by paid agitators, versus 20% who viewed them as spontaneous.

A 21–24 November poll conducted by El Financiero reported that 48% of respondents rated the Sheinbaum administration's handling of the protests as "bad" or "very bad", compared with 31% who rated it "good" or "very good". Negative views also extended to the protests themselves, with 55% disapproving of how the marches were conducted and 47% expressing disapproval of the demonstrators’ demands.

==== Counterprotests ====
Shortly after the 15 November demonstration, supporters of the Sheinbaum administration organized a response aimed at demonstrating political strength on 6 December. The ruling party, Morena, mobilized its base for the event. Although Sheinbaum did not join the march to the city center, she led a rally at the Zócalo, marking the seventh anniversary of the Fourth Transformation. Mexico City authorities estimated attendance at over 600,000.

=== International ===
On 17 November, U.S. President Donald Trump referenced the 15 November protests during an Oval Office press conference, stating he had observed "some big problems" in Mexico City over the weekend. Israeli Foreign Minister Gideon Saar condemned antisemitic graffiti that appeared during the protests.

== See also ==
- Yo Soy 132 – student protest movement formed in 2012 to oppose media bias and the candidacy of Enrique Peña Nieto
