= Quiroz =

Surname

Quiróz is a Spanish surname. The Portuguese version is Queirós.

- Alejandro Quiroz, Mexican modern pentathlete
- Ana Lilia Guillén Quiroz (born 1955), Mexican politician
- Celso Camacho Quiroz, fourth-generation Mexican potter who works in Metepec, Mexico
- César Camacho Quiroz (born 1959), Mexican lawyer and politician
- Clarita de Quiroz, Scottish singer/songwriter and model of Dutch, Irish, Filipino, Spanish descent
- David Quiróz (born 1982), Ecuadorian footballer
- Esteban Quiroz (born 1992), Mexican professional baseball infielder
- Fernando Quiroz, retired Argentine football midfielder
- Francisco Quiroz (1957–1993), former WBA Lightweight champion
- Grecia Quiroz, Mexican politician
- Guillermo Quiróz (born 1981), Major League Baseball catcher
- Jimmy Quiroz (born 1983), Chilean footballer
- Lisa Garcia Quiroz (1961–2018), Hispanic-American business executive at Time Warner
- Manuel Jose de Quiroz (died 1765), 18th-century Guatemalan composer
- Manuel Juan Robustiano de los Dolores Rodriguez Torices y Quiroz (1788–1816), Neogranadine statesman, lawyer, journalist, Precursor of the Independence of Colombia
- María Fernanda Quiroz (born 1986), Mexican actress
- María García Quiroz (born 1968), Mexican politician
- Pamela Anne Quiroz (born 1960), American sociologist
- Roberto Quiroz, Ecuadorian tennis player
- Salvador Quiroz (1892–1956), Mexican film actor
- Sergio Lorenzo Quiroz (born 1959), Mexican politician
- Sergio Quiróz, Mexican footballer
- Walter Quiroz (born 1972), Argentine theatre, television and film actor

== See also ==
- Queiroz, the Portuguese form of the name
- Santiago Pérez Quiroz Airport serving Arauca, Colombia
- José Manuel Quiroz District, one of seven districts of the province San Marcos in Peru
