= Teleférico de Uruapan =

Mexican public transport system

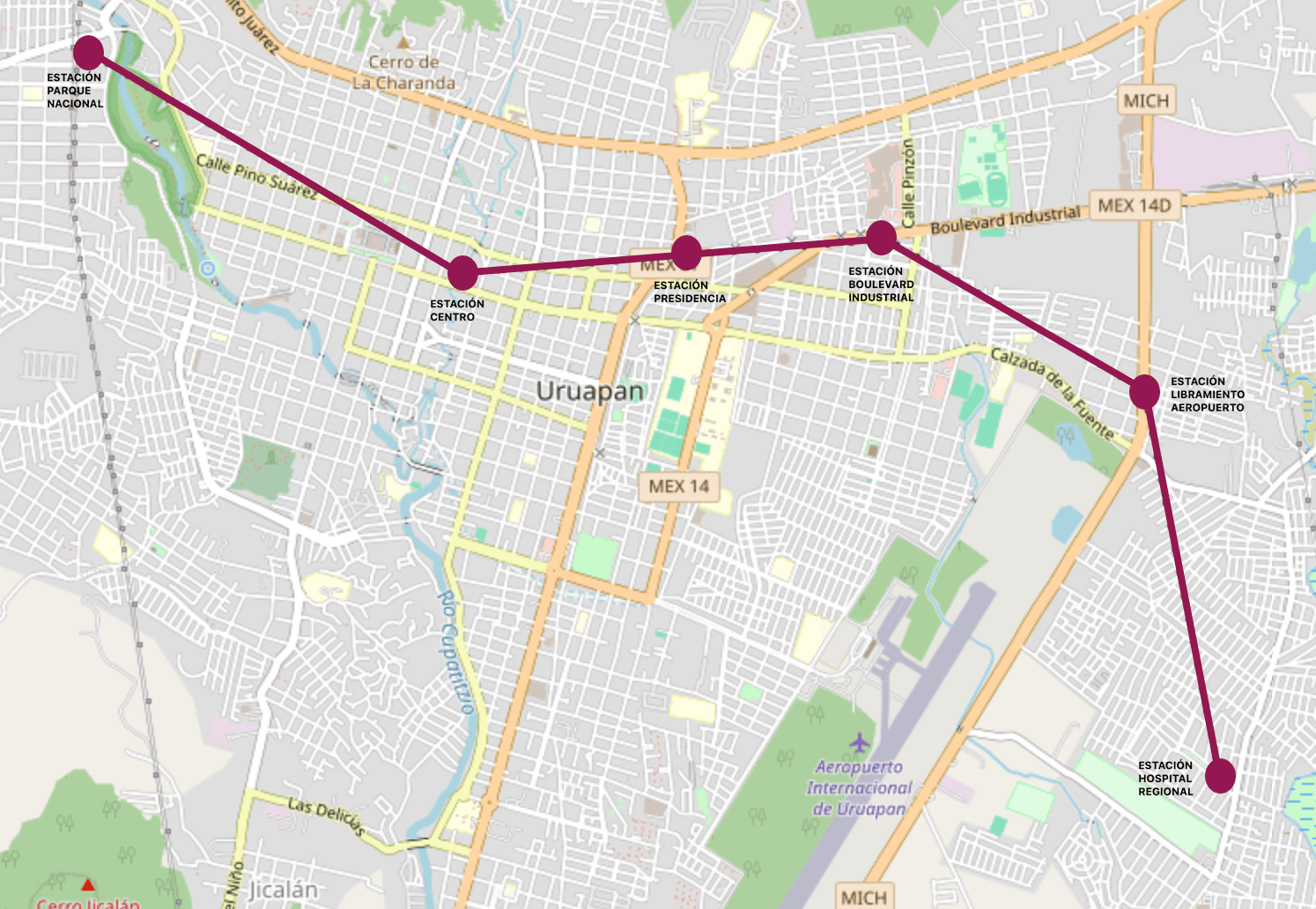

Overview
- Locale: Uruapan, Michoacán, Mexico
- Transit type: Cable car
- Number of lines: 1
- Number of stations: 6
- Daily ridership: 18,000 per day (estimated, 2026)
- Website: Teleférico Uruapan

Operation
- Began operation: 18 April 2026
- Operator: Gobierno del Estado de Michoacán
- Number of vehicles: 91

Technical
- System length: 8.4 km (5.2 mi)

The Teleférico de Uruapan is an aerial lift line in Uruapan, the second largest city in the Mexican state of Michoacán. It was created by the Government of Michoacán. It is the third public transportation system of its kind built in Mexico, and the first outside of Greater Mexico City.

== History ==
In February 2024, the governor of Michoacán, Alfredo Ramírez Bedolla, announced the construction of an air transport system in the city of Uruapan. The project would have a route of 8.4 kilometers and an estimated investment of 3.2 billion MXN.

Throughout its construction, the project faced problems, criticism, and protests due to local concerns about the impact of the works on environmental issues, mobility, and neighborhood life in the areas where the cable car route was planned. This included some protests, legal challenges, and denials of construction permits that delayed the project's construction.

During Carlos Manzo's administration, a political conflict arose between the Uruapan City Council and the Michoacán Government over the cable car project. The City Council used its authority to grant permits for the project as a means of pressuring the government to secure additional infrastructure for the transportation system and increased attention from state and federal security forces. Following Manzo's assassination, the cable car construction site became a focal point of protests by his supporters.

After several months of delays, the cable car was inaugurated on 18 April 2026.

== Station list ==
Stations	Picture	Date opened
Hospital Regional		18 April 2026
Libramiento Aeropuerto		18 April 2026
Boulevard Industrial		18 April 2026
Presidencia		18 April 2026
Centro		18 April 2026
Parque Nacional		18 April 2026

== See also ==
- Cablebús, a similar system operating in Mexico City.
- Mexicable, a similar system operating in the State of Mexico.
- Teleférico de Morelia, under construction in the state capital, Morelia.
