= Grecia Quiroz =

Mexican politician (born 1990)

Municipal president of Uruapan
- Substitute
- Assumed office November 5, 2025
- Appointed by: Congress of Michoacán
- Preceded by: Carlos Manzo (Interim: Hilda Flor del Campo Medina)

Personal details
- Born: Grecia Itzel Quiroz García; 16 January 1990 (age 36) Uruapan, Michoacán, Mexico
- Party: Independent
- Spouse: Carlos Manzo (died 2025)
- Children: 2

Grecia Itzel Quiroz García (Note: In this Spanish name, the first or paternal surname is Quiroz and the second or maternal family name is García.) (born January 16, 1990) is a Mexican politician serving as the municipal president (mayor) of Uruapan, Michoacán. She assumed office on November 5, 2025, following the assassination of her husband, Carlos Manzo, who had been mayor. Quiroz was nominated by Manzo's independent political organization, the Movimiento del Sombrero, and appointed by the Congress of Michoacán to serve the remainder of the 2024 to 2027 term.

Prior to becoming municipal president, Quiroz led the local family services agency (DIF) in Uruapan during her husband's term as mayor. She previously worked in the federal Chamber of Deputies and was a candidate for the Michoacán Congress in the 2024 state elections.

== Early career ==
Quiroz was born in Uruapan, Michoacán, in 1990 and holds a degree in political science. As of January 2024, she worked in the Chamber of Deputies. She was an early supporter of Carlos Manzo's Movimiento del Sombrero. At that time, she was a candidate for the Congress of Michoacán's 20th district (South Uruapan) in the 2024 state elections.

Quiroz led the local family services agency (DIF) in Uruapan.

== Municipal president of Uruapan ==
=== Nomination ===
Quiroz's husband, Carlos Manzo, was assassinated during a public Day of the Dead event in central Uruapan, leaving the municipal presidency vacant. His death was presumed to be an execution by the Jalisco New Generation Cartel.

The Movimiento del Sombrero proposed Quiroz as the new municipal president. Carlos Bautista Tafolla, a local representative for the movement, confirmed the nomination and described Quiroz as a "very experienced and strong woman" who had been with the movement "from the beginning."

The Uruapan Cabildo (City Council) submitted the formal request to the state legislature, which expedited the process. The Michoacán Congress received the official request for her nomination and appointed her as the substitute mayor. The nomination received widespread political backing. Fabiola Alanís Sámano, the president of the Political Coordination Board (Jucopo) and the Morena party caucus coordinator, confirmed that Quiroz had the "absolute support" of all political forces and stated, "There will be no difficulty, no obstacle, and no one who opposes this decision." Alanís Sámano also affirmed the legislature's "unconditional support" to ensure the "governability of Uruapan".

Quiroz was sworn in on Wednesday, November 5, 2025, during an extraordinary session of the state legislature to serve the remainder of the 2024 to 2027 constitutional term.

=== Tenure ===
In her first speech as municipal president on November 5, 2025, Quiroz stated, "Today I come with a broken heart because they took my life partner, my partner in struggle, the father of my children." She affirmed that the Movimiento del sombrero would not stop and that she would "take up" her husband's legacy.

Quiroz criticized the government's new Michoacán Plan for Justice and Peace, lamenting that her husband had to be executed for the government to "turn its gaze to Uruapan". She asked the people of Uruapan not to falter in the fight against organized crime. She also defended her husband's legacy, stating he was "destined to be 'the president of Mexico'" and that his "hands were clean", as he "never made a pact with anyone".

Amid protests following the assassination, Quiroz called for peaceful demonstrations, asking supporters to honor her husband's memory by avoiding violence or vandalism. She noted that her husband's "fight was always peaceful" and that he "always stood against violence."

On Tuesday, November 4, Quiroz met with President Claudia Sheinbaum at the National Palace in Mexico City. The meeting, which lasted a couple of hours, took place shortly after the presentation of a new pacification plan for Michoacán. President Sheinbaum later stated the meeting included Quiroz's brother-in-law, Juan Manzo; the federal secretary of security, Omar García Harfuch; and Lázaro Cárdenas Batel, her chief of staff and a former governor of Michoacán. According to Sheinbaum, Quiroz and her family "rightfully demand justice" and a full investigation. The president announced she would remain in communication with Quiroz to support Uruapan, where the presidency plans to open a new office.

== Personal life ==
Quiroz was married to politician Carlos Manzo until his assassination in 2025. They had two children.
