= Cristina Ayala =

Cristina Ayala may refer to:

- Cristina Ayala (writer) (1856–1936), Cuban writer
- Cristina Ayala (politician) (born 1972), Spanish politician
- Cristina Portillo Ayala (born 1968), Mexican politician
- Christina Ayala (born 1983), American politician
