= Valeria Márquez =

Valeria Márquez may refer to:

- Valeria Márquez (gymnast), a Spanish rhythmic gymnast
- Killing of Valeria Márquez, Mexican influencer (2002–2025)
