= Uruapan massacre =

2019 massacre in Uruapan, Mexico

On August 8, 2019, Mexican authorities confirmed the discovery of 19 bodies in Uruapan, Michoacán. The Jalisco New Generation Cartel, through narcomantas, claimed responsibility for the massacre, in which bodies were displayed in three parts of the city. Six of the bodies found were hung on a vehicular bridge and others were found dismembered.

The banners left with the bodies included threats from the Jalisco New Generation Cartel to alleged members of Los Viagras. Mexican media and authorities attributed the bloodshed to fighting between cartels in the state of Michoacán, calling this one of the cartel violence's most brutal episodes.

== Discovery of the bodies ==
In the early hours of August 8 2019, police responded to an emergency call, where they found seven dismembered bodies on Industrial Boulevard, a few steps from the Petróleos de México pedestrian bridge. Minutes later, authorities located another six bodies elsewhere on Industrial Boulevard, at the intersection with Libramiento Oriente, in the La Cofradía neighborhood. In the México neighborhood, bags with the remains of three people were found.

Finally, around 5 in the morning, motorists alerted the municipal police authorities to report three more hanging bodies. Near the bodies was a banner with a message threatening presumed members of Los Viagras, and claiming that the violence is not "war against the people."

=== Background ===
Before the massacre, the Jalisco New Generation Cartel had announced its arrival in the municipality with a series of narcomantas threatening rival groups.

Months later, an ambush carried out in a wooded area of the municipality, among members of criminal organizations, left ten dead and three injured, setting off the alarms of the state authorities.

== Investigation ==
In the hours following the massacre, authorities identified the victims as including a law intern, a merchant, a musician, a waiter, a housewife, and a locksmith. The following day, authorities confirmed the arrest of 14 people in relation to the massacre, including two minors. The arrests took place in the city of Silao.

In his morning conference, the President of Mexico, Andrés Manuel López Obrador, mourned the loss of life, mentioning that he will continue his current crime-fighting strategy. He also pointed out that the previous president, Felipe Calderón, had carried armed forces operations in Michoacán in the past.
