= Killing of Valeria Márquez =

Killing of Mexican influencer (2002–2025)

Atziri Valeria Márquez López
- Valeria Márquez's beauty salon
- Born: 14 February 2003; Guadalajara, Jalisco, Mexico
- Died: 13 May 2025 (aged 23); Zapopan, Jalisco, Mexico
- Cause of death: Gunshot wound
- Burial place: Parque Funeral Colonias (in Zapopan)
- Occupations: Influencer, model, businesswoman
- Years active: 2021–2025

On 13 May 2025, 23-year-old Mexican model, businesswoman, and digital content creator Atziri Valeria Márquez López (14 February 2002 – 13 May 2025) was shot and killed while live streaming on TikTok inside her beauty salon in Zapopan, Jalisco. She had gained prior recognition on social media through her lifestyle-oriented posts before establishing her business.

== Career ==
Márquez's modeling career began in 2018, at the age of 16, when she was selected as a model for the Mexican clothing brand Vicio Vanidad. In 2021, she earned the title of "Miss Rostro". Márquez participated in advertising-campaigns for brands such as the jewelry brand Golden Deluxe and the shapewear company Beauty Body Level, both based in Guadalajara. Márquez began posting on social media in the late 2010s. Márquez also modeled for local campaigns and boutiques, solidifying her image as an influencer among youth audiences in western Mexico. Her visual style combined modern aesthetics with traditional Mexican design elements, attracting the attention of various brands. Márquez studied dentistry before embarking on her career in cosmetology. In 2024, Márquez opened her own beauty salon in the municipality of Zapopan, Jalisco.

== Murder and investigation ==
Márquez was shot dead on 13 May 2025, at the age of 23, at her beauty salon in Zapopan, while broadcasting live on TikTok. She was held in her salon by an alleged delivery man (whose face was covered by a mask) who shot her in the chest and head while streaming live. Earlier during the livestream, Márquez expressed concern about her safety. A few seconds after she was killed, Márquez's phone was taken and the live broadcast was stopped by an employee. The Jalisco Prosecutor's Office stated that at the time of the crime, two men were present outside the beauty salon, who then fled.

The autopsy confirmed Márquez died from the gunshot wounds, and an investigation of alleged femicide were opened, as stated by Mexican President Claudia Sheinbaum, who also sent her condolences to Márquez's family. On 16 May, the Jalisco prosecutor's office announced that it would summon Márquez's friends and family members as witnesses, and the police stated they were investigating more than one suspect. Soon after her death, tributes of flowers were placed outside Márquez's beauty salon. Some time after her burial, her tomb was vandalized. Márquez's TikTok account was closed shortly after her killing.

On 18 June 2025, the U.S. Treasury sanctioned five senior members of the Jalisco New Generation Cartel (CJNG) for drug trafficking and violence; Márquez's killing was noted as an example of Mexico’s ongoing femicide crisis. Among the cartel members sanctioned was Ricardo Ruiz Velasco, a suspect in the killing.

On 31 July 2026, federal public security secretary Omar García Harfuch said that Ramón Ángel Álvarez Ayala, alias "R1", who had been arrested the previous day for allegedly ordering the assassination of Uruapan mayor Carlos Manzo, had also allegedly ordered Márquez's killing at the request of his son, Francisco "N". According to García Harfuch, Francisco had previously been in a relationship with Márquez, had threatened her on several occasions, and was being sought by authorities.

== See also ==
- Femicide in Mexico
