= Mike Love Not War =

Mike Love Not War is a reference to Beach Boys singer Mike Love and may also refer to:

- Mike Love Not War (EP), an extended play by the band Smudge
- Mike Love Not War, an album by Mike Love

== See also ==
- Make love, not war, an anti-war slogan commonly associated with the American counterculture of the 1960s
