= Bedolla =

Bedolla is a surname. Notable people with the surname include:

- Alfredo Ramírez Bedolla (born 1976), Mexican politician
- Leonardo Bedolla (born 1993), Mexican footballer
- Lisa García Bedolla, American political scientist
- Pablo Bedolla López (born 1955), Mexican politician
