= Alfredo Ramírez Bedolla =

Mexican politician

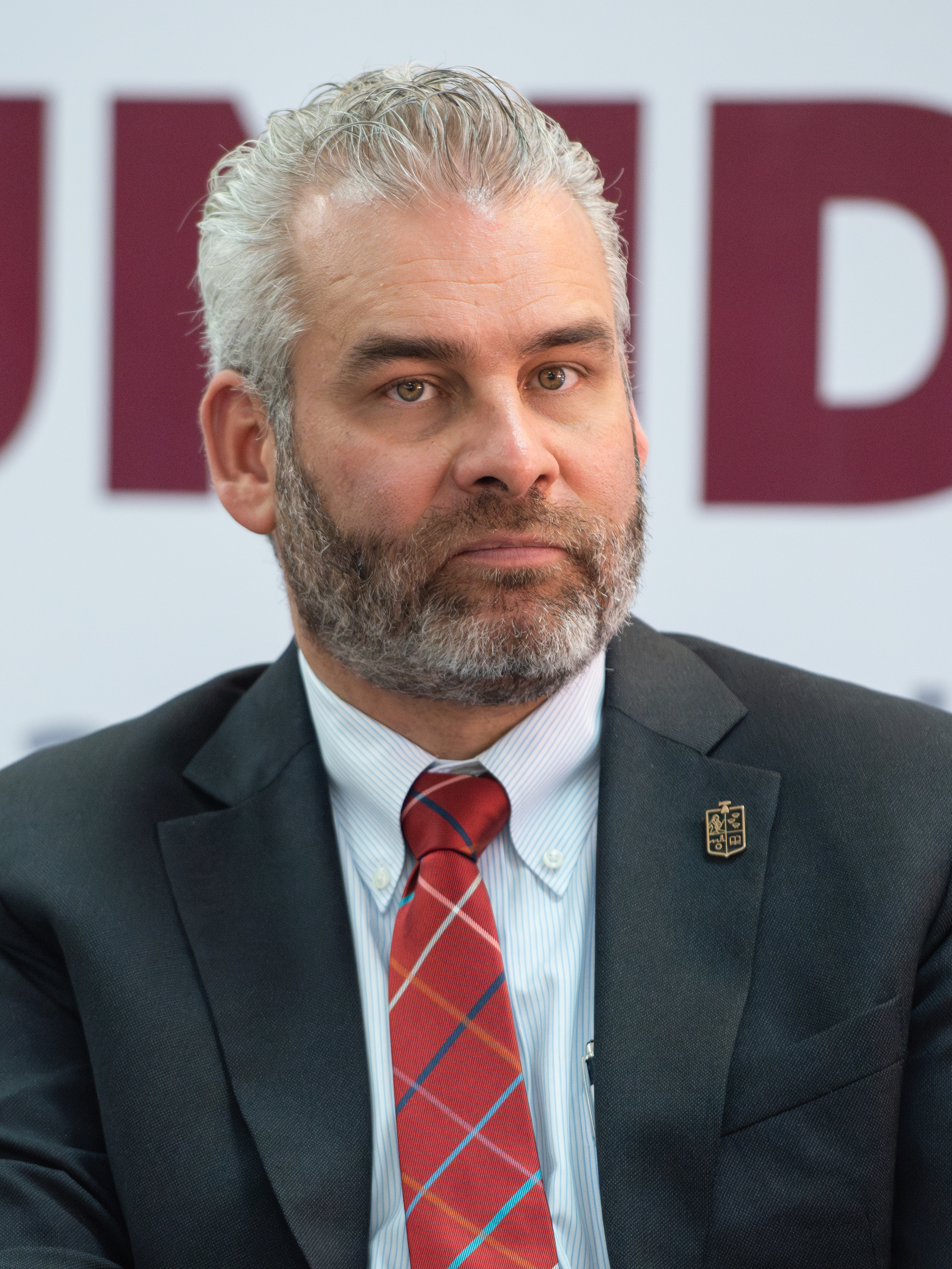
- Ramírez Bedolla in 2023

Governor of Michoacán
- Incumbent
- Assumed office 1 October 2021
- Preceded by: Silvano Aureoles Conejo

Personal details
- Born: 22 February 1976 (age 50) Morelia, Michoacán, México
- Party: National Regeneration Movement (2014–present); Party of the Democratic Revolution (1997–2014)
- Spouse: Grisel Tello
- Occupation: Lawyer

Alfredo Ramírez Bedolla (Note: In this Spanish name, the first or paternal surname is Ramírez and the second or maternal family name is Bedolla.) (born 22 February 1976) is a Mexican lawyer and politician. Currently a member of the National Regeneration Movement (Morena), he previously belonged to the Party of the Democratic Revolution (PRD).

In 2018, he was elected to serve in the Congress of Michoacán on the Morena ticket and, in 2021, he was elected to a six-year term as governor of Michoacán.

== Career ==
Ramírez Bedolla ran as a candidate for the mayoralty of Morelia in 2015, but he was not elected. In the 2018 election, he successfully stood as a candidate for the Congress of Michoacán.

=== Governor of Michoacán ===
In 2021, Ramírez Bedolla intended to run for the mayoralty of Morelia again, but instead ran for governor of Michoacán. He won with 41.77% of the vote, defeating Party of the Democratic Revolution (PRD) candidate Carlos Herrera Tello, who took 38.92% of the vote.

During his administration, seven of Michoacán's municipal presidents have been killed, including Carlos Manzo, together with activists such as Hipólito Mora. Journalist Anabel Hernández has also alleged that the organized crime group Cárteles Unidos enjoys Ramírez Bedolla's protection.

On 24 June 2024, he announced that U.S. and Mexican authorities finalized a deal to resume inspections of mangos and avocados after a week-long suspension due to security concerns. He met with Ken Salazar, U.S. Ambassador to Mexico, prior to the announcement. Exports of avocados out of Michoacán had been halted by the U.S. Department of Agriculture following reports that Americans employed as inspectors were being held against their will amid a protest over police compensation.
