= Barranca del Cupatitzio National Park =

National park in Michoacán, Mexico

- Parque Nacional Barranca del Cupatitzio
- IUCN category II (national park)
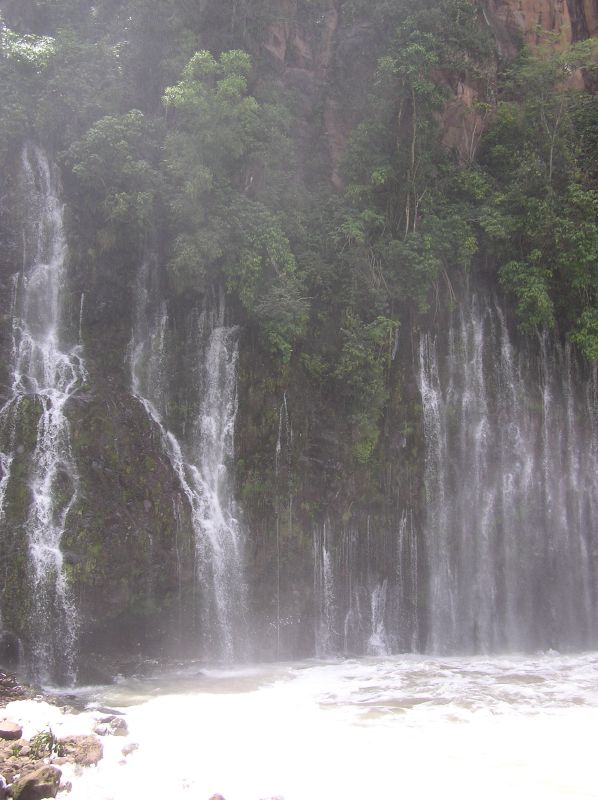
- The cascades of Tzararácua

- Location within Mexico
- Interactive map of Barranca del Cupatitzio National Park
- Location: Uruapan and Nuevo Parangaricutiro Municipalities, Michoacán, Mexico
- Nearest city: Uruapan, Michoacán
- Coordinates: 19°25′48″N 102°06′00″W
- Area: 458.21 hectares (1,132.3 acres)
- Established: November 2, 1938
- Governing body: Secretariat of Environment and Natural Resources

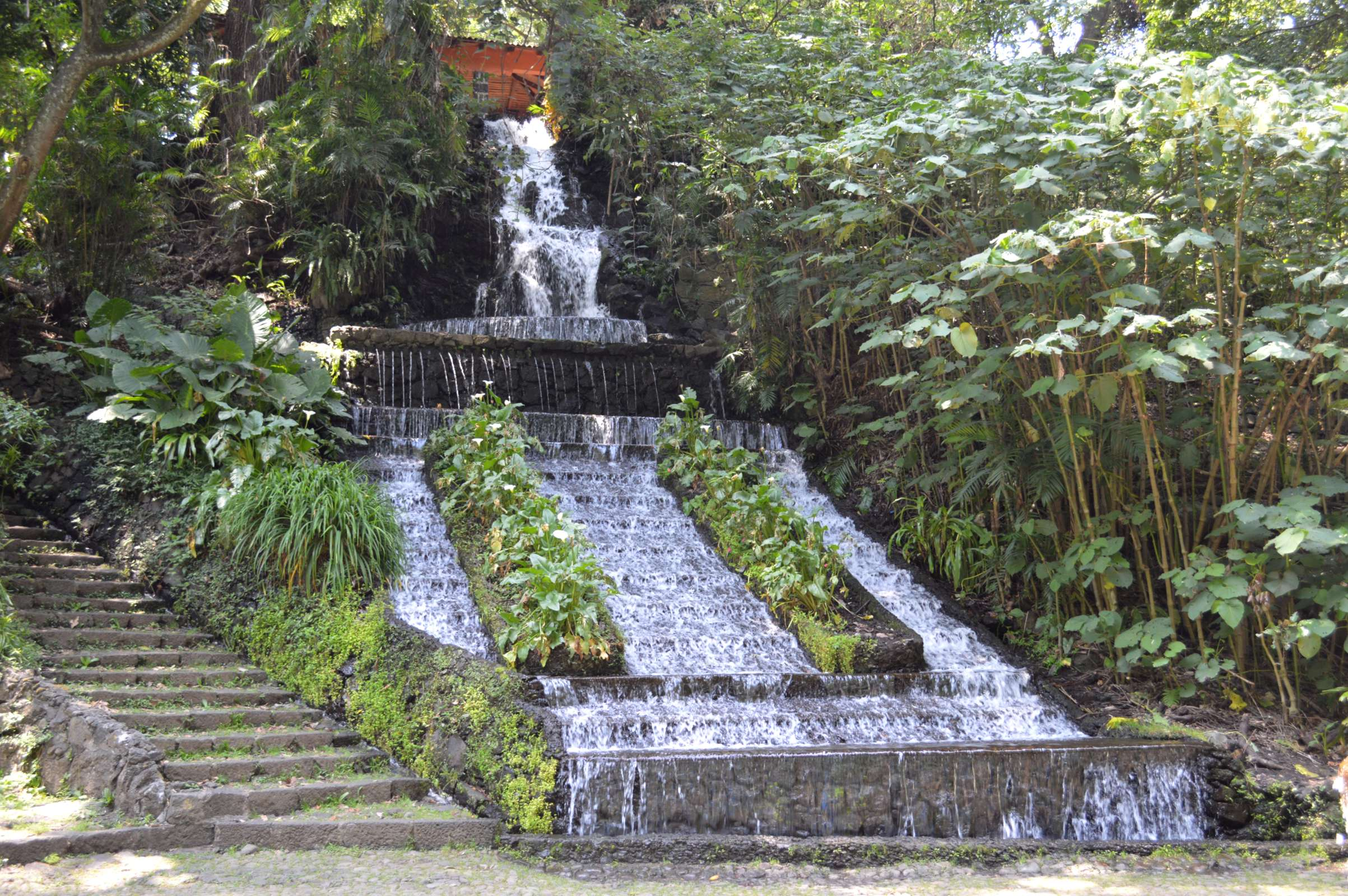
Uriata fountain alongside the ravine of the Cupatitzio River

Barranca del Cupatitzio National Park (Spanish: Parque Nacional Barranca del Cupatitzio) is a national park in the Mexican state of Michoacán, centered around the headwaters of the Cupatitzio River. The river emerges from an underground spring, carving a small ravine as the water begins to flow. The park is known for its abundant streams and springs, many of which cascade down the sides of the ravine to form small waterfalls.

Barranca del Cupatitzio was declared a federally protected area in 1938, after the land was bought by the Mexican government to create a recreation area. Most of the park is located in the northwest part of the municipality of Uruapan, with the rest located in the neighboring municipality of Nuevo Parangaricutiro. The park is largely urban, with the most popular section entirely surrounded by the city of Uruapan. Inside, the ground is soft and wet, with broad-leafed temperate and tropical vegetation, various walking paths near the river, and a number of artificial fountains built on the sides of the ravine to take advantage of natural water flows. The park attracts tens of thousands of visitors each year.

== Description ==
=== Location ===
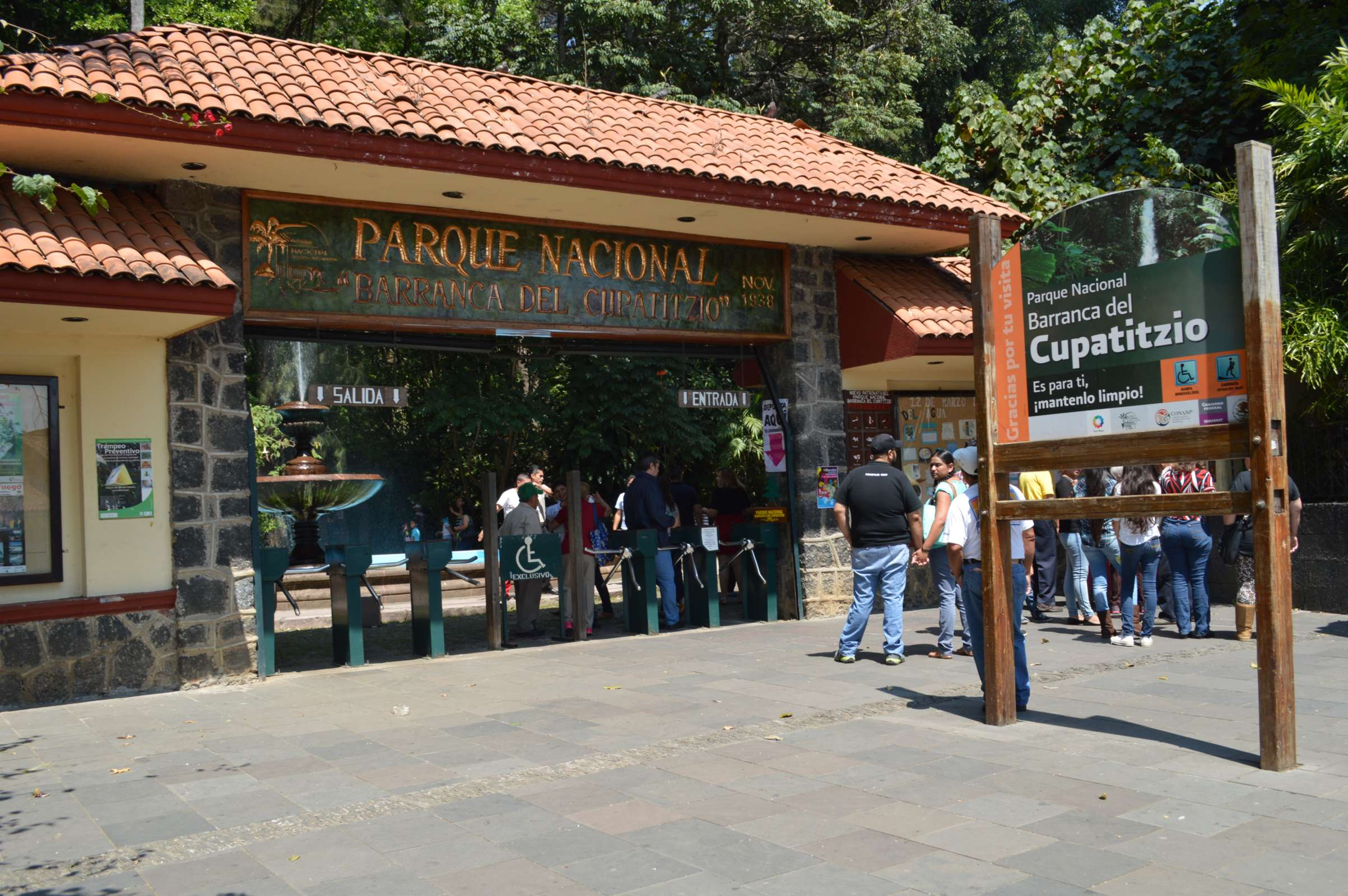
Main entrance to the park

Barranca del Cupatitzio National Park is located 5 kilometers within and immediately to the west of the city of Uruapan in Michoacán, approximately 110 kilometres (68 mi) southwest of the state's capital of Morelia and 400 kilometres (250 mi) west of Mexico City. It is divided into two main sections: the 19.66-hectare (48.6-acre) eastern section, designated the Área de Río, is located within the city of Uruapan and provides the primary recreational access for the public; the much larger and less accessible western section, designated the Área de Montaña, covers 438.55 hectares (1,083.7 acres) of dense highland forest between Uruapan proper and the town of Nuevo San Juan Parangaricutiro to the west.

=== History ===
Established on November 2, 1938, the park is officially named the Eduardo Ruiz National Park, after a local writer and historian who dedicated himself to recompiling local legends. The park protects more than 450 hectares (1.7 sq mi) of forest and river valley, about 20 hectares of which are centered around the origin of the Cupatitzio River and open to the public.

The entrance to the park is accessible by public transportation, and there is a permanent handcraft market, or Mercado de Artesanías, which sells wares from the region. The main walking trails are along the ravine, and the river area can be walked in half a day. The park has five official guides certified by its administrative body, the Comisión Nacional de Áreas Naturales Protegidas (CONANP).

The area was previously privately owned and called the Quinta Hurtado, after the family that owned it (Hurtado). In the mid-20th century, the area was bought by the government to convert it into a recreation center. At the northern entrance, there is the former hacienda house, now the Hotel Mansion de Cupatitzio.

The park attracts thousands of visitors per year (255,200 in 2013) due to its natural plant and bird life, scenic waterfalls and fountains, and opportunities for recreation. Locals are not charged admission fees; adults from elsewhere typically must pay a fee of 25 Mexican pesos per visitor.

== Hydrology ==
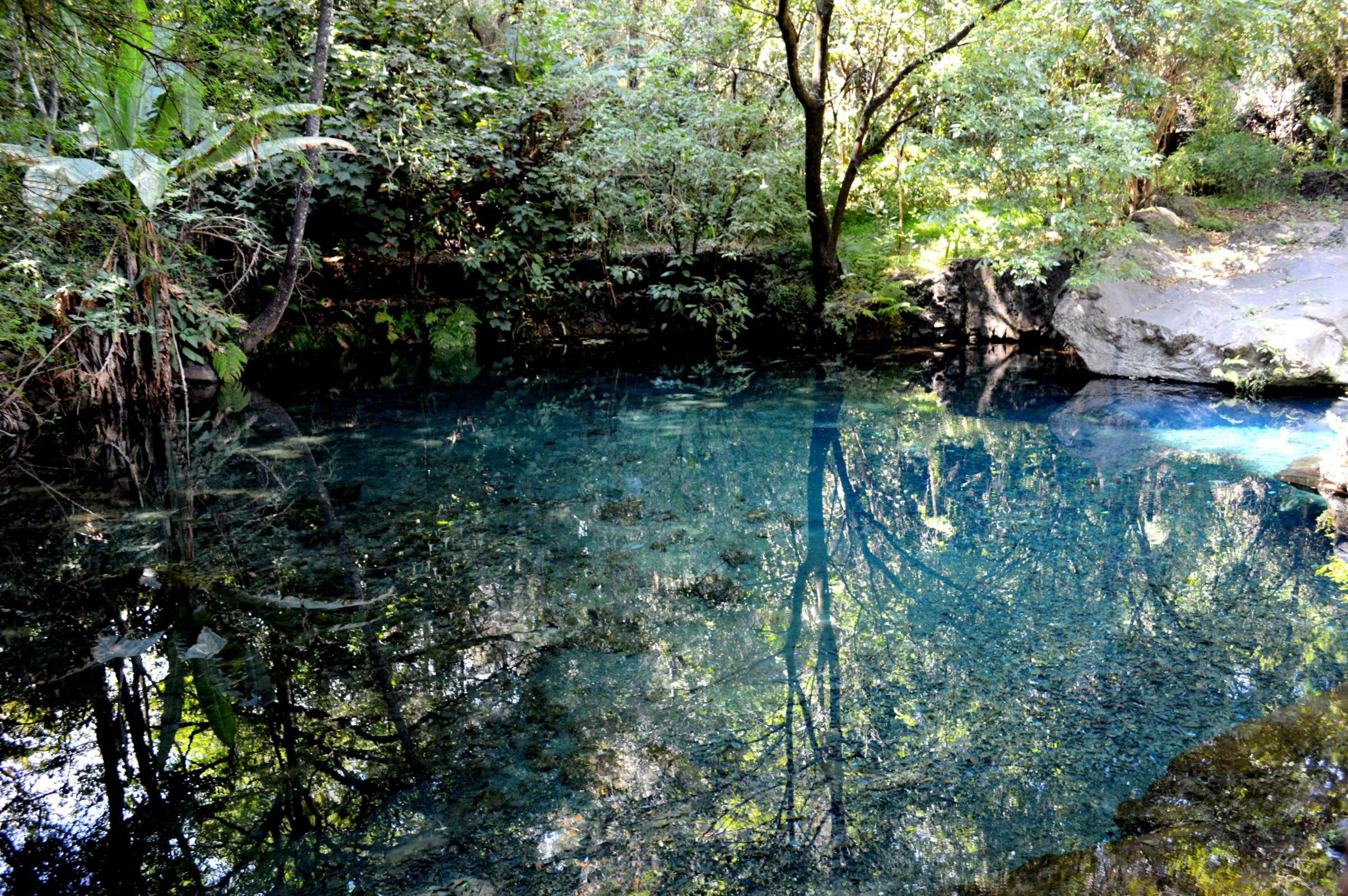
Pond of the spring that is the source of the river

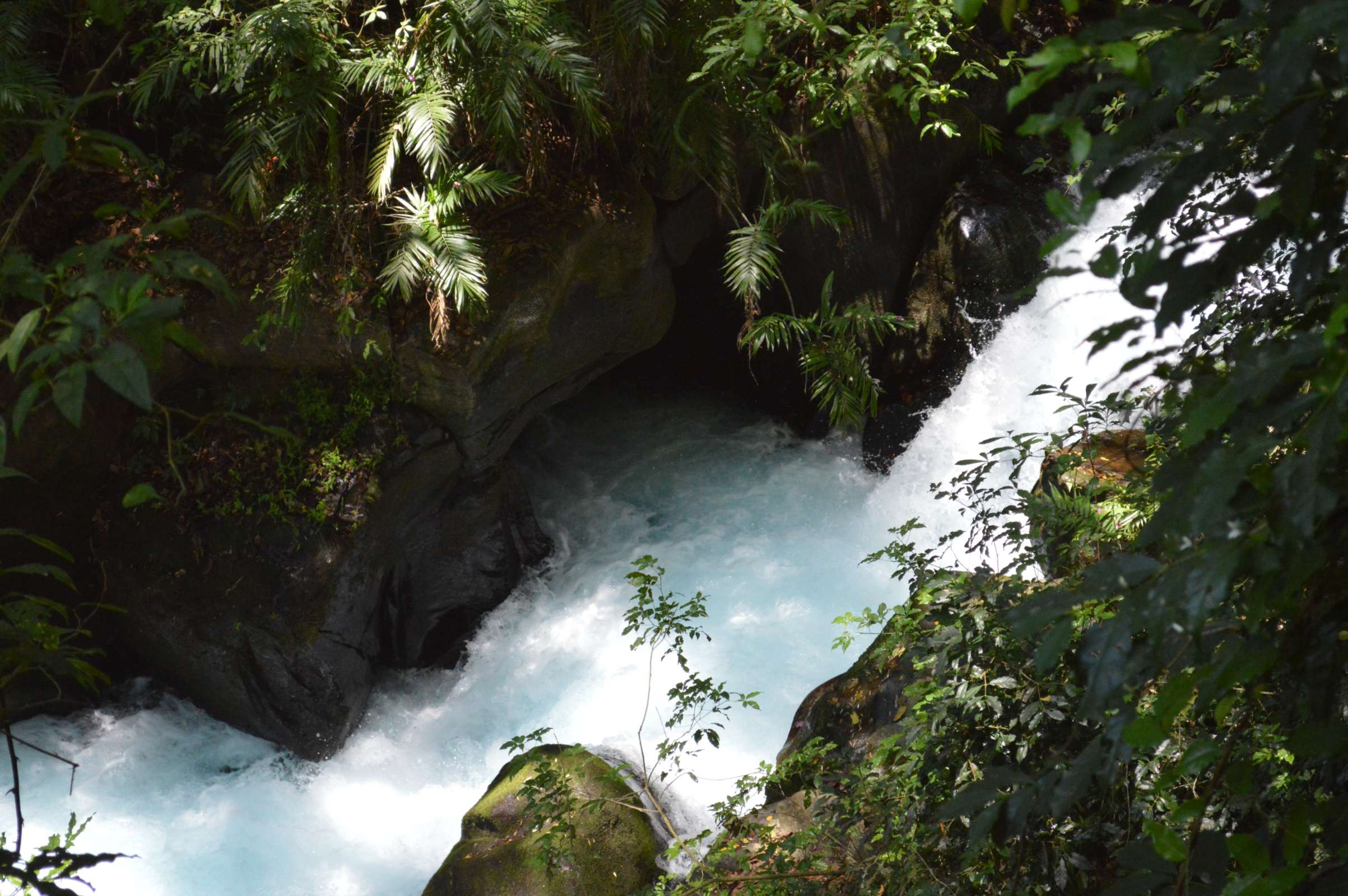
Rapids near La Golgota

The park is centered on a ravine formed by the emergence of the Cupatitzio River, whose name means "river that sings" in the indigenous Purépecha language. This area has soft, wet ground and a temperate climate, and its flora is mainly broad-leafed plants.

The river begins here as a natural convergence of a number of small streams and springs, and the water here is clean. The water falling down the sides of the ravine creates small natural waterfalls or is taken advantage of to create natural fountains, which makes the park unique in Mexico. Notable waterfalls include Camelina, La Yerbabuena, El Golgota, and Tzararácua. Fountains include La Copa de Oro, Cutzi – La Luna-, Arcoiris, Velo de Novia and Janintzizic.

The best known spring is at the very beginning of the river, called La Rodilla del Diablo ("The Devil's Knee"), after a small indentation in the rock next to the pool formed by the spring. According to local myth, the indentation was formed by the Devil falling to his knees, but there are competing versions as to why he did. The first states that he was forced to his knees by a crucifix held by Juan de San Miguel, the Franciscan friar who founded modern Uruapan. Another version of the story states that the impression was made by the knee when the Devil tripped and fell fleeing from the same person.

There are a number of stone bridges to allow visitors to cross back and forth between the two banks of the river, with names such as Los Recién Casados and Los Enamorados. The area also contains a mural named Eréndira by local artist Manuel Pérez Coronado, which is badly deteriorated. At certain points where the water in the river is deep enough, young divers perform for tips.
