= Cupatitzio River =

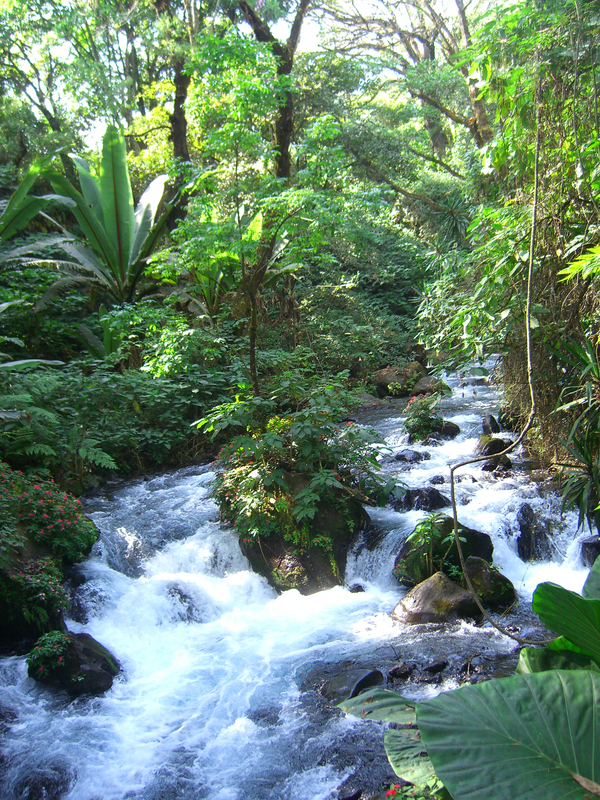
- Cupatitzio River in Barranca del Cupatitzio National Park, Michoacán.

Location
- Country: Mexico
- State: Michoacán

The Cupatitzio River is a river of Michoacán state in Southwestern Mexico.

== Course ==
Its main headwaters are in Barranca del Cupatitzio National Park, in Uruapan, Michoacán. Near its source are two waterfalls, the larger Tzararacua and the smaller Tzararacuita (little Tzararacua).

After flowing some distance in the highlands ("Altiplano") of western-central Michoacan state, the river takes a course mainly towards the south.

It drains into the Balsas River which, in turn, empties into the Pacific Ocean.

== See also ==
- List of rivers of Mexico
