= Jimmy Quiroz =

Chilean footballer (born 1983)

Personal information
- Full name: Jimmy Orlando Quiroz Plaza
- Date of birth: 27 May 1983 (age 43)
- Place of birth: Santiago, Chile
- Height: 1.81 m (5 ft 11 in)
- Position: Midfielder

Senior career*
Years	Team	Apps	(Gls)
2005	Magallanes	2	(0)
2006–2007	Deportes Copiapó	44	(9)
2008–2010	San Marcos de Arica	81	(21)
2010–2011	Unión San Felipe	30	(3)
2012	Puerto Montt	36	(3)
2013	San Antonio Unido	6	(0)
- * Club domestic league appearances and goals as of 29 March 2020

Jimmy Orlando Quiroz Plaza (born 27 May 1983) is a Chilean footballer.

His last club was San Antonio Unido.
