= Pamela Anne Quiroz =

American sociologist

- Born: March 28, 1960 (age 66)
- Education: Missouri Western State University, Iowa State University, University of Chicago
- Known for: Educational sociology
- Scientific career
- Fields: Sociology
- Institutions: University of Houston, University of Illinois-Chicago
- Thesis: A study of decision-making in the educational process of Latino high school students (1993)

Pamela Anne Quiroz (born March 28, 1960) is an American sociologist. She is executive director of Inter University Program on Latino Research and former director of Center for Mexican American Studies and professor of sociology, University of Houston.

== Life and work ==
Quiroz earned her BS in Sociology/Biology at Missouri Western State University, her MA in sociology at Iowa State University and PhD at the University of Chicago in 1993.

She has been a professor of sociology at the University of Houston, and director of the Center for Mexican American Studies there, since the fall of 2015. Previously, she was a professor of sociology and educational policy studies at the University of Illinois-Chicago. She served as the editor-in-chief of Social Problems.

Her research interests focus on children, youth and family including: race and inequality; education; identity; and qualitative methods for academic appointments with special emphasis on the development of individual identities among school students.

== Selected awards ==
- Texas Executive Women's “Women on the Move”
- Houston Business Journal's “Women Who Mean Business” (Outstanding nonprofit leaders category)
- Sola Magazine “Woman of the Year” in Education
- Mayor's Hispanic Advisory Board's Award in Education
- HACE Mujeres Leadership Cohort (Houston)
- Hispanic Association of Colleges and Universities fellow
