= José Alfredo Ortega =

Mexican general

José Alfredo Ortega Reyes

Secretary of State Security of Michoacán
- In office October 1, 2021 – June 21, 2024
- Succeeded by: Juan Carlos Oseguera Cortés

Personal details
- Born: José Alfredo Ortega Reyes Michoacán, Mexico
- Education: Universidad Anahuac Mexico Norte

Military service
- Allegiance: Mexico
- Rank: General
- Commands: Director General of Strategic Planning at SEDENA

José Alfredo Ortega Reyes is a Mexican general who served as the Secretary of State Security of Michoacán from October 2021 to June 2024.

== Biography ==
Ortega was born in Michoacán. He attended the Universidad Anáhuac México Norte majoring in business administration. Prior to becoming the secretary of state security, Ortega worked as the Director General of Strategic Planning, Security, and Intelligence at SEDENA under eight different defense secretaries. Ortega worked across the Mexican Ministry of Defense and the National Guard during his career.

Ortega was appointed as the Secretary of State Security of Michoacán on October 1, 2021. During his tenure, he particularly targeted cartel and gang activity that occurred along Michoacán's borders, where he believed the conflict stemmed from. In an interview with Milenio in 2022, Ortega stated that he planned on expanding Michoacán state military capacity and to increase civic engagement with the government to decrease socio-economic issues that would aid the cartels. Ortega also stated he planned on targeting communities in the state vulnerable to violence and also conducting joint operations with neighboring states to combat cross-border illicit activities.

In January 2023, Ortega stated that under his administration the security situation in Michoacan was very complex but improvements were beginning to be seen, such as the eradication of cartel-coordinated vehicle theft. This was due to Ortega's increase in National Guard (GC) troops throughout the state who were implanted into cities across the state, particularly those most affected by violence. By connecting all areas of the state into a system under state control, cartel activity depleted. Between 2021 and 2024, homicides in Michoacán decreased by 36%, robbery of transport workers by 48%, and robbery on public transportation by 30%. Michoacaán went from the third most-dangerous state in Mexico in 2016 to no longer being considered high-risk by the Mexican government.

Ortega resigned from his position on June 21, 2024. He was succeeded by Juan Carlos Oseguera Cortés.
