= Abrazos, no balazos =

Mexican anti-war slogan

"Abrazos, no balazos" is a Spanish-language anti-war slogan, commonly translated in English-language media as "Hugs, not bullets" or "Hugs, not slugs" (though "balazo" is more literally "gunshot"), and often compared to the English "Make love, not war".

== History ==
The slogan was initially associated with the Chicano counterculture of the 1960s, and figured prominently in the Mexican-American anti-war movement, as a slogan in opposition to United States involvement in the Vietnam War.

It continues to be a feature of informal street art. Photographer Lupe Flores documented its use as graffiti on the Mexico–United States border wall, protesting the wall and the militarization of border communities.

=== Mexico ===
It later became more broadly used throughout Mexican and Mexican-American culture. Andrés Manuel López Obrador, 65th President of Mexico, used the slogan to describe his security policy during the campaign season of the 2012 Mexican general election. The general idea being that he would seek to reduce the escalating violence of the drug cartels, as well as "moralize" police forces widely seen as brutal and corrupt within the context of the Mexican drug war. However, this policy has remained controversial as the homicide rate reached record levels during AMLO´s presidency. By late 2024, time in which Claudia Sheinbaum began her presidency, the policy of "hugs, not bullets" was seen widely as abandoned as the new government has been perceived as once again taking a more aggressive stance against drug violence.

The city of Matamoros, Tamaulipas implemented a policy based on the slogan in an attempt to reduce violent crime.
