= Cristina Portillo Ayala =

Mexican politician

- Born: 30 December 1969 (age 56); Morelia, Michoacán, Mexico
- Occupation: Politician
- Political party: MORENA

Cristina Portillo Ayala (born 30 December 1969) is a Mexican politician affiliated with the National Regeneration Movement (MORENA). As of 1997 she served as Deputy of the LVI and LIX Legislatures of the Mexican Congress and as of 2018 serves as Deputy of the LXXIV Legislature of the Michoacán Congress.
