= Uruapan =

Uruapan, Michoacán
- City and municipality
- Uruapan del Progreso
- Uruapan Plaza

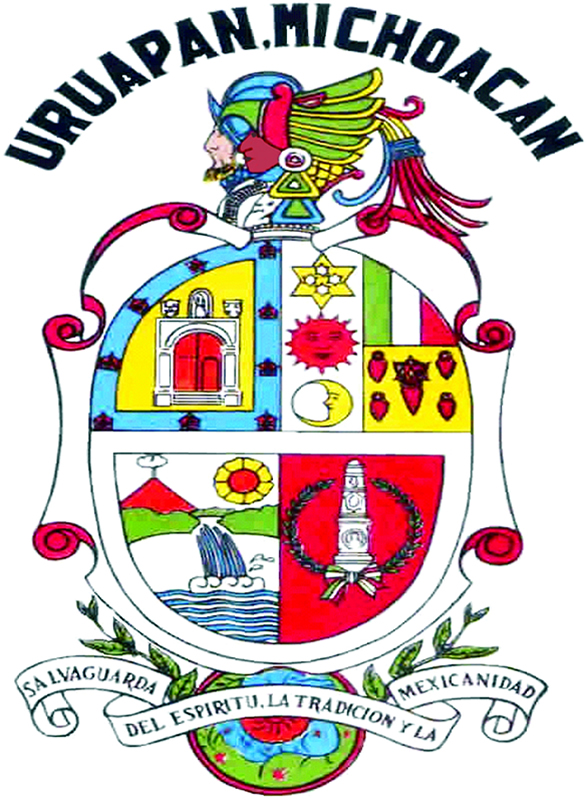
- Coat of arms
- Nickname: Capital mundial del aguacate. (World capital of the avocado)
- Motto: Salvaguarda del espíritu, la tradición y la mexicanidad. (Safeguard of the spirit, tradition, and Mexican nationalism)
- Location of Uruapan in Mexico Uruapan, Michoacán (Mexico)
- Coordinates: 19°25′15″N 102°03′46″W
- Country: Mexico
- State: Michoacán
- Founded: 1533
- Founder: Fray Juan de San Miguel

Government
  - Mayor: Grecia Quiroz (Ind.)

Area
  - Total: 45 km^{2} (17 sq mi)
- Elevation: 1,620 m (5,310 ft)

Population (2020)
  - Total: 299,523
  - Density: 6,600/km^{2} (17,000/sq mi)
  - Municipality: 356,786
- Time zone: UTC−6 (CST)
- Postal code: 60000 -
- Area code: 452
- Website: Official Website

Uruapan del Progreso, simply known as Uruapan (Spanish pronunciation: [uˈɾwa.pan]), is the second largest city in the Mexican state of Michoacán. It is located at the western edge of the Purépecha highlands, just to the east of the Tierra Caliente region. Since the colonial period, it has been an important city economically due to its location. The city was conquered by the Spanish in 1522, when the last Purépecha ruler fled the Pátzcuaro area to here. The modern city was laid out in 1534 by Friar Juan de San Miguel. It played an important role in the War of Independence, and was the capital of Michoacán during the French Intervention. Today it is the center of Mexico's avocado growing region, with most of the crop distributed from here nationally and internationally.

== The city ==
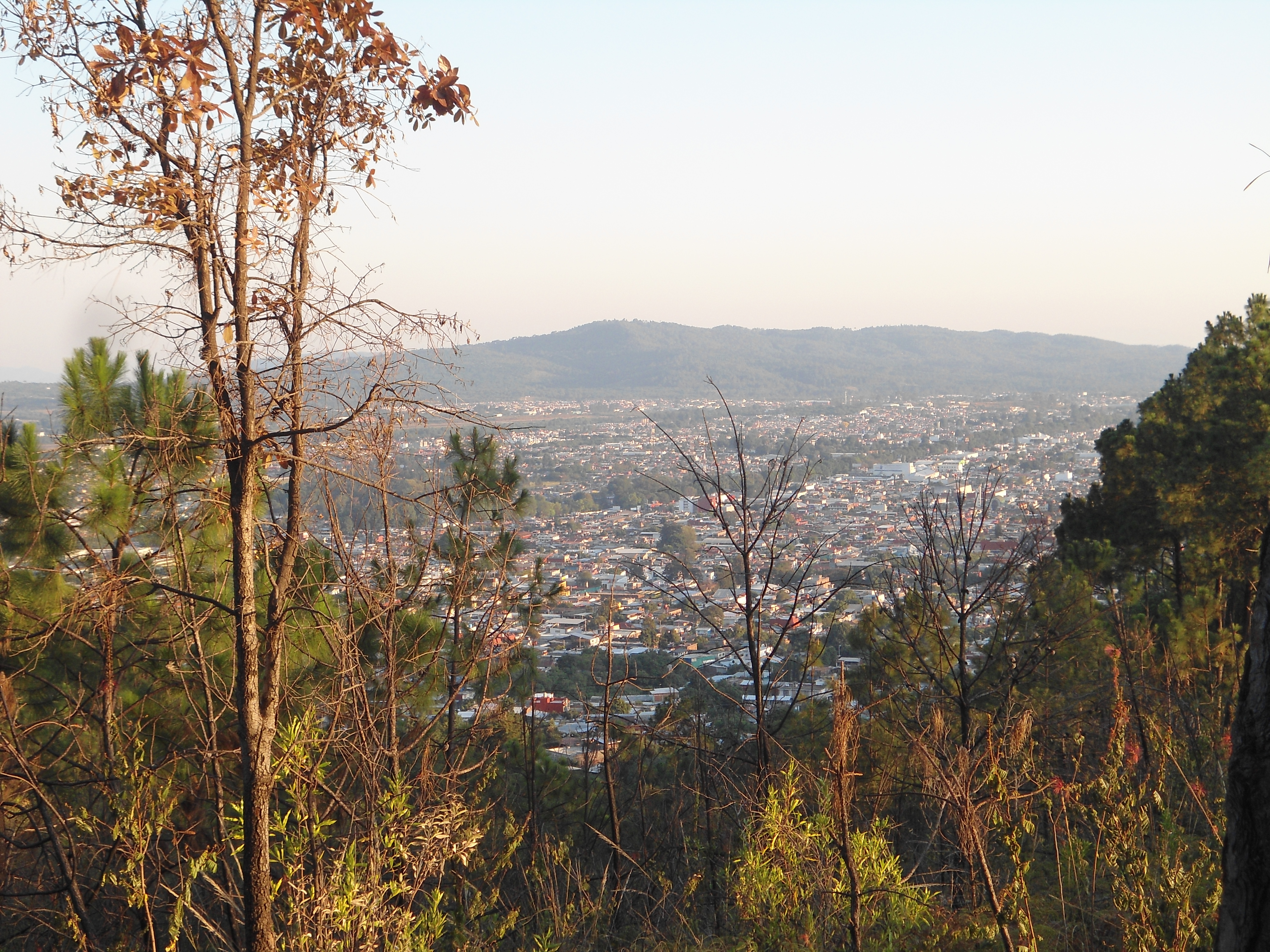
View of the city from the Cerro de la Charanda.

With a population of over 356,700, the city is the second most populous and the second in economic importance in the state of Michoacán. The city is located at the western edge of the Purépecha highlands of the state at 1,620 meters above sea level.

The city's center has colonial architecture which contain Plateresque and Moorish elements. There are six historic neighborhoods of the city: San Miguel, San Pedro, San Francisco, Santa Maria Magdalena, San Juan Bautista and Santiago, all of which have colonial-era chapels in their centers. Each of these neighborhoods have their own festival: San José on March 19, El Vergel on the third Friday in June, San Juan Quemado on June 24, San Pedro on June 29, La Magdalena on July 22, Santiago on July 25, San Miguel on September 29, San Francisco de Asis on October 4. The patron saints' days of these neighborhoods are celebrated with colorful dances such as Los Negritos.

Uruapan Plaza

The center of the city is marked by the very large and long Plaza de Martires de Uruapan. Facing this plaza are two commercial portals as well as some of the city's most important landmarks. On the north side, there is the La Huatápera Museum, officially called the Museo de los Cuatro Pueblos Indios. Huatápera is a Purépecha word, meaning "meeting place," and according to tradition, it was built over a pre Hispanic platform, obtaining its social importance from this. Originally the site was a hospital called Hospital Real de la Purísima Concepción established by Juan de San Miguel in 1533, the first of its kind in the Americas. It functioned not only to heal the sick but also as a center for evangelism and to organize workers by trade. It has a chapel called Santo Entierro, with fine stonework in cantera in Plateresque style. Above the chapel's arch, there is a niche which contains a sculpture of either Francis of Assisi or Juan de San Miguel flanked by the coats of arms of the Franciscans and the Spanish crown. The interior is restored and contains images of angels playing musical instruments and important people from the history of the Catholic Church. The rest of the complex shows Moorish influence and houses a collection of handcrafts from the various indigenous communities of the state. Just to the east of Huatápera is the Immaculate Concepción church, which was built in the late 20th century. It has a cantera portal finished in the 1970s but no cupola nor bell tower.

The Casa de Cultura (Cultural Center) is located on the western side of Huatápera. It was built in 1992 over what was the Franciscan monastery established by Juan de San Miguel. The original church of this monastery is now the parish church for the city. Built in 1533, it maintains its 16th century Plateresque portal, and the interior of the church has a crucifix that dates from the 18th century. The paintings on the triangular spaces just under the cupola represent salvation and the miracle of the Mass, done by Mohamed Socidel.

Behind this line of monuments is a market called the Mercado de Antojitos, whose stalls are dedicated to the sale of prepared traditional foods such as carnitas, barbacoas, quesadillas and the like.

The western side of the city is home to the Barranca del Cupatitzio National Park, the second most-visited national park in Mexico. Despite being almost completely surrounded by the city, the park contains trees hundreds of years old, springs, streams, canals and walking paths. The park focuses on the conservation of the ravine which forms the headwaters of the Cupatitzio River, which is fed by various springs and streams starting with the "Rodilla del Diablo" (Devil's Knee). According to local myth, Juan de San Miguel forced the Devil to bow before the Cross, with the Devil's knee making an indentation in the rock from which the first spring emerges. The land was private until the 1930s when the federal government bought it to create the park. The ravine has various waterfalls such as La Yerbabuena and El Golgota, bridges and fountains that take advantage of natural water supply. There is also a mural called Erédira by local artist Manuel Pérez Coronado, but it is almost completely deteriorated.

The San Pedro Factory is a still-operational textile factory built in the late 19th century, when the city was at its industrial peak. Construction of the mill began in 1886, originally to work with cotton but later expanded to other fibers, such as linen and silk. The factory is still in operation but not to the same capacity as in the past. The current owners maintain the more handcrafted feel of the products making bedspreads, tablecloths, napkins and more. Part of the complex is now used for cultural and other events.

The city is home to the narrowest house in the world according to the Guinness Book of World Records. Located at 50-C Carrillo Puerto, it measures 1.40 by 7.70 meters.

The Palm Sunday Handcraft Market is held during Holy Week with the most important day being Palm Sunday, after which it is named. It covered the city large main square and attracts over a thousand artisans who sell. In addition to traditional observances for Day of the Dead, the city has sponsored the Festival de Velas on the same days, where candles are arranged and lit to form figures at the Martires de Uruapan and Morelos plazas as well as on adjoining streets. There an Avocado Festival from mid November to mid December which consists of exhibitions and cultural events.

The city's cuisine is influenced not only by the various ethnic groups in the area but also migration from other parts of Michoacan. Typical dishes include corundas, churipo (a beef and vegetable stew), mutton barbacoa, carnitas, quesadillas with squash flowers, flour tamales, various flavors of sweet and spicy atole, hot chocolate, uchepos, sweet potatoes and plantains cooked in various ways and more.

== The municipality ==
The city of Uruapan is the seat of a municipality and serves as the head of local government for surrounding communities that extend over 954.17 km^{2} (368.41 sq mi). Outside of Uruapan proper, the main communities are Capacuaro, Angahuan, San, Caltzontzin, Jucutacato, Santa, Corupo and Nuevo, all of which are dedicated to agriculture and/or forestry. The municipality borders those of Charapan, Paracho, Nahuatzen, Tingambato, Ziracuaretiro, Taretan, Gabriel Zamora, Nuevo Parangaricutiro, Peribán and Los Reyes. The municipal government consists of a municipal president, a syndic, and 12 representatives called regidors.

The municipality has a population of over 315,000, of which 18,020 speak an indigenous language, mostly Purépecha. Traditional music is mostly influenced by the Purépecha culture with pirecuas and sons, as well as those played by wind instruments.

The El Sabino Zoocriadero is home to various exotic species. It is 17 km outside the city in an area that has a warmer climate. Its main attraction is its crocodiles but it also has lions, badgers, deer, ostriches and turtles.

== Socioeconomics ==
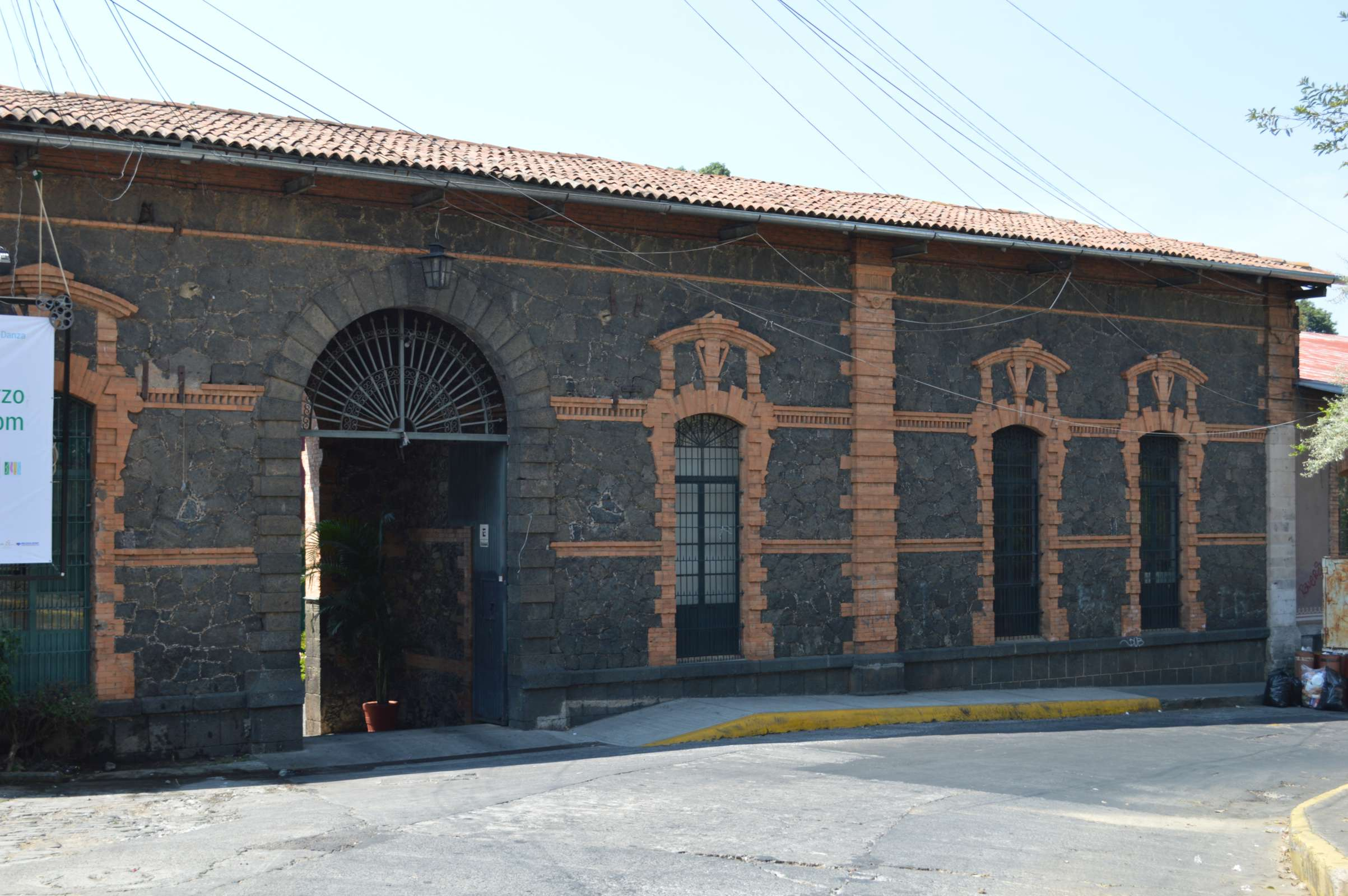

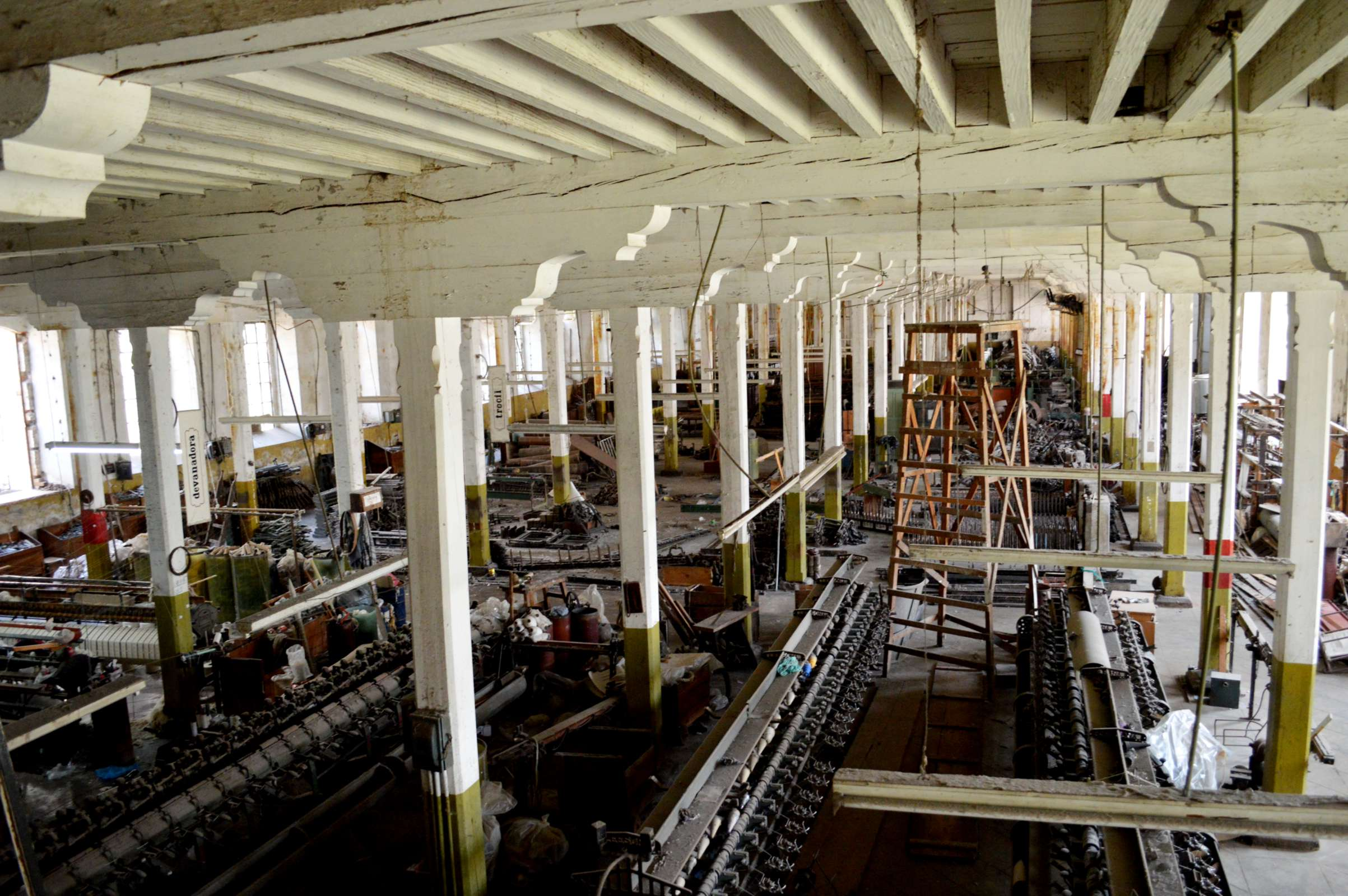
The Fábrica de Textiles de San Pedro, a late 19th century textile factory.

Since the colonial period, the area has been an agricultural center growing bananas, chicozapote, mamey, limes, oranges, lemons, avocados and more. Today, the city is the second most important economically in the state of Michoacán, with a very low level of socioeconomic marginalization. About 12.5% live in extreme poverty, with thirteen communities with about 350 who are extremely marginalized from social services.

The city is surrounded by avocado and macadamia orchards. It is located in the most productive regions in Mexico for avocado. It is called the world capital of avocado not because of the production in the municipality but because it is home of six packing companies to which the region sends its avocados for distribution. From here, avocados are shipped all over Mexico and exported to the United States, Central America, Europe and Japan. In 2000, the city made the Guinness Book of World Records creating the largest batch of guacamole, making 1,288 kilograms of the dip, from one ton of fresh avocados.

Native to Australia, macadamias have been grown in the Uruapan area since the late 20th century. The city makes a number of products from the nut such as nuts flavored with garlic, chili peppers, soy sauce or salt. They are also made into brittle, cookies, candies and oil.

Since the colonial period, the city has been a center of the production of maque, an indigenous form of lacquer, used to wooden items such as plates, platters, boxes, chests and dried gourds. Other handcrafts produced here include masks, papel picado, and textiles.

== Geography ==
=== Climate ===
The municipality has a humid subtropical climate (Cwa in the Köppen climate classification) with very wet summers, dry winters and lush forests. It is part of the Trans-Mexican Volcanic Belt and mountainous. Principal peaks include Charanda, La Cruz, Jicalán and Magdalena. The climate is between temperate and tropical, with most rain falling in the summer. Average annual rainfall is 1,759.3 mm and average annual temperatures are between 8 and 37.5 C.

Climate data for Uruapan
Month	Jan	Feb	Mar	Apr	May	Jun	Jul	Aug	Sep	Oct	Nov	Dec	Year
Record high °C (°F)	31.7 (89.1)	36.0 (96.8)	39.0 (102.2)	35.4 (95.7)	35.6 (96.1)	36.5 (97.7)	33.0 (91.4)	31.5 (88.7)	33.0 (91.4)	32.5 (90.5)	34.5 (94.1)	36.0 (96.8)	39.0 (102.2)
Mean daily maximum °C (°F)	24.7 (76.5)	26.1 (79.0)	28.3 (82.9)	30.0 (86.0)	30.1 (86.2)	27.6 (81.7)	26.3 (79.3)	26.1 (79.0)	26.0 (78.8)	26.4 (79.5)	26.0 (78.8)	24.9 (76.8)	26.9 (80.4)
Daily mean °C (°F)	16.9 (62.4)	17.8 (64.0)	19.5 (67.1)	21.2 (70.2)	22.0 (71.6)	21.4 (70.5)	20.5 (68.9)	20.3 (68.5)	20.2 (68.4)	19.9 (67.8)	18.8 (65.8)	17.6 (63.7)	19.7 (67.5)
Mean daily minimum °C (°F)	9.1 (48.4)	9.4 (48.9)	10.7 (51.3)	12.5 (54.5)	14.0 (57.2)	15.3 (59.5)	14.7 (58.5)	14.6 (58.3)	14.5 (58.1)	13.3 (55.9)	11.6 (52.9)	10.3 (50.5)	12.5 (54.5)
Record low °C (°F)	−1.0 (30.2)	−0.1 (31.8)	0.2 (32.4)	−2.5 (27.5)	1.0 (33.8)	3.4 (38.1)	7.2 (45.0)	5.3 (41.5)	3.1 (37.6)	−0.5 (31.1)	1.8 (35.2)	−1.2 (29.8)	−2.5 (27.5)
Average precipitation mm (inches)	45.2 (1.78)	10.5 (0.41)	6.3 (0.25)	9.0 (0.35)	31.9 (1.26)	270.5 (10.65)	326.0 (12.83)	338.1 (13.31)	299.3 (11.78)	138.3 (5.44)	32.1 (1.26)	13.5 (0.53)	1,520.7 (59.87)
Average precipitation days (≥ 0.1 mm)	2.4	1.7	1.2	1.2	4.8	18.0	23.9	23.8	21.9	13.2	4.2	2.1	118.4
Source 1: Servicio Meteorologico Nacional
Source 2: Servicio Meteorologico Nacional (extremes)

=== Flora and fauna ===
The flora is mostly mixed forest, with pine, oak and deciduous tropical rainforest. Logging includes pine, oak and oyamel fir. Areas without trees mostly consist of scrub of various kinds. Notable fauna includes coyote, skunks, deer, foxes, cacomixtle, hares, opossums, ducks and other birds.

=== Hydrography ===
The municipality contains numerous small rivers that belongs to the Tepalcatepec basin. The main river is the Cupatitzio. Other important bodies of water include the Caltzontzin Reservoir (also known as the Santa Barbara or Santa Catarina) and waterfalls such as Salto Escondido, Cupatitzio and La Tzaráracua.

The La Tzararacua Ecotourism Center is located 10 km south of the city proper, centered on a 40-meter high waterfall of the same name. Next to this is the Tzararcuita (Little Tzararacua), at 16 meters high.

== History ==
=== Designation ===
The name comes from the Purépecha word uruapani which means plants that flower and fruit at the same time or those which are always giving fruit. The coat of arms was designed by Luis Valencia Madrigal and represents the history of the area since the pre Hispanic period as well as its natural resources.

=== Pre-Hispanic history ===
Uruapan was a pre-Hispanic settlement, inhabited primarily by Purépechas. Much of the history is unknown with numerous unexcavated archeological sites. The oldest document about the area is the Lienzo de Jucutacato, found in the community of Jicalán. It is known that the area was conquered in 1400 by an alliance of the lords of Pátzcuaro, Tzintzuntzan and Ihuatzio.

=== Colonial era ===
When the Spanish invaded the Purépecha Empire, the last ruler fled to Uruapan, leading the Spanish here in 1522. For this reason the Spanish arrived here in 1522. In 1524, the area became an encomienda under Francisco de Villegas and evangelized by the Franciscans.

Franciscan friar Juan de San Miguel is considered the founder of the modern city, tracing it out in 1534 into nine neighborhoods, each with its own chapel and patron saint, and assigned who would live in each one. In 1540 the area became an Indian Republic.

During the colonial period, the city was a strategic location, especially for commerce, between the Purépecha highlands and the Tierra Caliente leading down to the coast.

In 1577 a plague decimated the population.

By 1754, the parish of Uruapan consisted of the city of Uruapan, three towns (San Francisco Xicalán, San Francisco Jucutacato and San Lorenzo) along with two ranches Tiamba and San Marcos along with the Carasa Hacienda. The population was a mix of Purépecha, European, African and mixed races peoples.

In 1766, the population revolted against efforts by the Spanish to recruit the population into military service. This was followed by repression and punishment of various persons by execution in 1767, both for the resistance of the prior year and protests against the expulsion of the Jesuits.

From 1795 to 1798, insurgent José María Morelos lived here. During the war, the city served as a refuge various times for insurgents, include local José María Izazaga.

=== 19th century ===
In 1806, an earthquake destroyed the hospital, and in 1817, the city was burned.

Uruapan officially became a municipality in 1831. For its role in the War of Independence, it was named a Ciudad del Progreso (City of Progress) in 1858.

In 1842, the city supported the rule of Antonio López de Santa Anna.

Because of the French Intervention, the Uruapan was the temporary capital of Michoacan from 1863 to 1867. In 1864, French troops entered and subdued the city. In 1865, General José María Arteaga, head of the Republican Army and four other officers were executed by firing squad, and are known as the Martyrs of Uruapan. In 1866 the Republicans tried to liberate the city from the French at the Battle of Magdalena but were defeated.

The first textile factory was set up in the city in 1874, and the first local newspaper, El Precursor Uruapense was founded in 1880. The first railroad line reached the city in 1899, and a trolley line was built between the rail station and the main plaza in 1900.

=== 20th and 21st centuries ===
In 1910, a fire destroyed several factories in the city.

The city was attacked several times during the Mexican Revolution, the most notable of which were led by Joaquín Amaro. In the 1930s, efforts to redistribute agricultural land began.

In 1947, the Tepalcatepec Commission was created which modernized the area's economy as well as infrastructure.

Since the late 20th century, the city has had problems with organized crime, along with much of the rest of the state. Two criminal organizations, Los Zetas and La Familia Michoacana, have fought for control here, because of its geographic location among drug routes. In 2014, the city was taken over briefly by the Grupos de Autodefensa Comunitaria or "autodefensas", an armed civilian movement trying to counter the power of the cartels, unsupported by the local and state government. In August 2019, 19 people were murdered by the Jalisco New Generation Cartel. On November 1, 2025, its municipal president Carlos Manzo was assassinated during the Day of the Dead celebration after speaking out against the Cartels.

== Transportation ==
- Uruapan International Airport
- Teleférico de Uruapan
