= Congress of Michoacán =

Legislature of Michoacán, Mexico

Congress of Michoacán Congreso del Estado de Michoacán
- LXXVI Legislature

Type
- Type: Unicameral

Structure
- Seats: 40 diputados
- Political groups: MORENA (14) PVEM (6) PT (5) PAN (4) PRD (3) Parliamentary Representation (3) PRI (2) MC (2) Independent (1)
- Length of term: 3 years
- Authority: Political Constitution of the Free and Sovereign State of Michoacán de Ocampo
- Salary: MX$66,118 per month

Elections
- Voting system: 24 with first-past-the-post and 16 with proportional representation
- Last election: 2 June 2024
- Next election: 2027

Meeting place
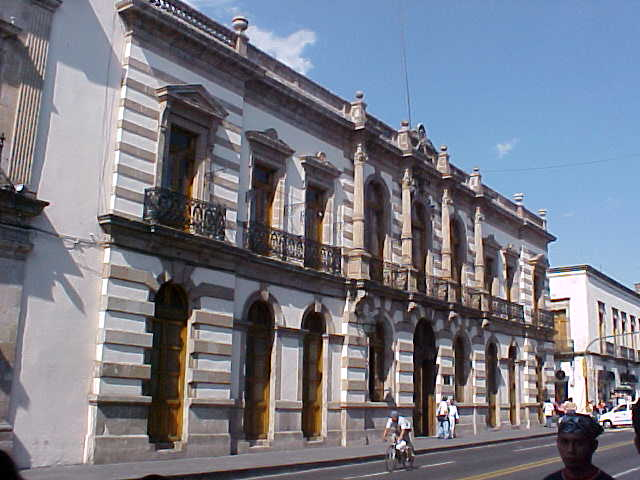
- Legislative Palace of Michoacán; Morelia, Michoacán, Mexico

Website
- congresomich.gob.mx

The Congress of the State of Michoacán (Spanish: Congreso del Estado de Michoacán) is the state legislature of Michoacán, a state of Mexico. The Congress is unicameral.

== See also ==
- List of Mexican state congresses
