= Presidency of Andrés Manuel López Obrador =

Presidential administration of Mexico from 2018 to 2024

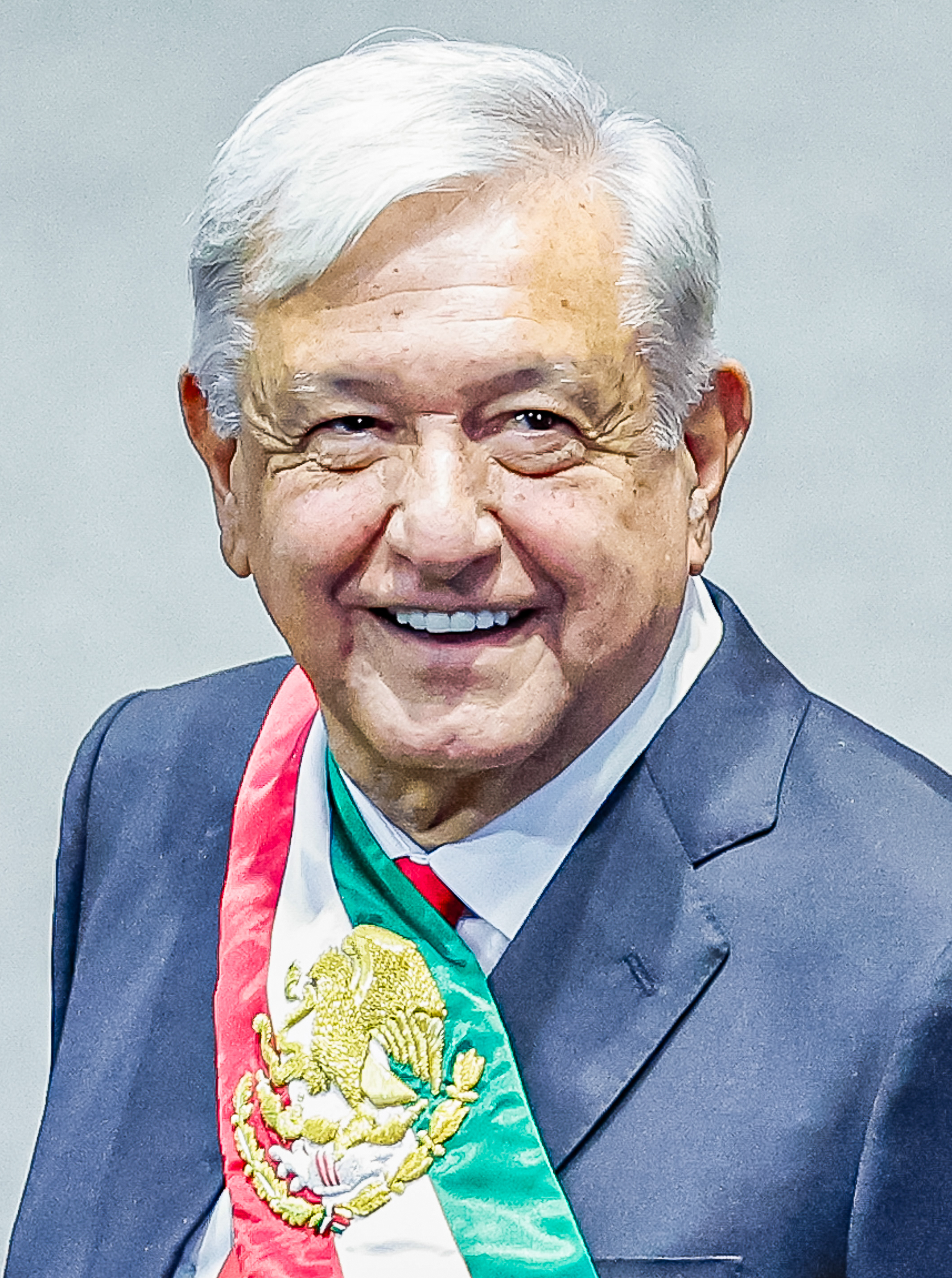
- Presidency of Andrés Manuel López Obrador; 1 December 2018 – 30 September 2024
- President: Andrés Manuel López Obrador
- Party: Morena
- Election: 2018
- Seat: The National Palace
- Seal of the federal government

Andrés Manuel López Obrador's tenure as the President of Mexico began with his inauguration on 1 December 2018, and ended on 30 September 2024. López Obrador, a member of the National Regeneration Movement (Morena) and former Head of Government of the Federal District, had previously run for president in the 2006 and 2012 elections. He assumed office following a landslide victory in the 2018 presidential election. Upon his inauguration, he became the oldest person to hold the office since the change to a six-year term of office.

== 2018 election ==
For the 2018 Mexican presidential election, López Obrador's political party, MORENA, formed the coalition Juntos Haremos Historia with left-wing Labor Party and socially conservative right-wing Social Encounter Party.

On 1 July 2018, López Obrador won a landslide victory against all other candidates, managing to secure 53% of the popular vote. His closest opponent, Ricardo Anaya, only garnered 22%. On 8 August, the Electoral Tribunal of the Federal Judiciary (TEPJF) certified López Obrador's victory, with his coalition becoming the dominant political force in the Mexican Congress, securing 69 out of 128 Senate seats and 308 out of 500 Chamber of Deputies seats.

López Obrador's victory was met by various reactions around the world. Congratulations came from world politicians that included Canadian Prime Minister Justin Trudeau, Russian President Vladimir Putin and US President Donald Trump.

== Transition period ==
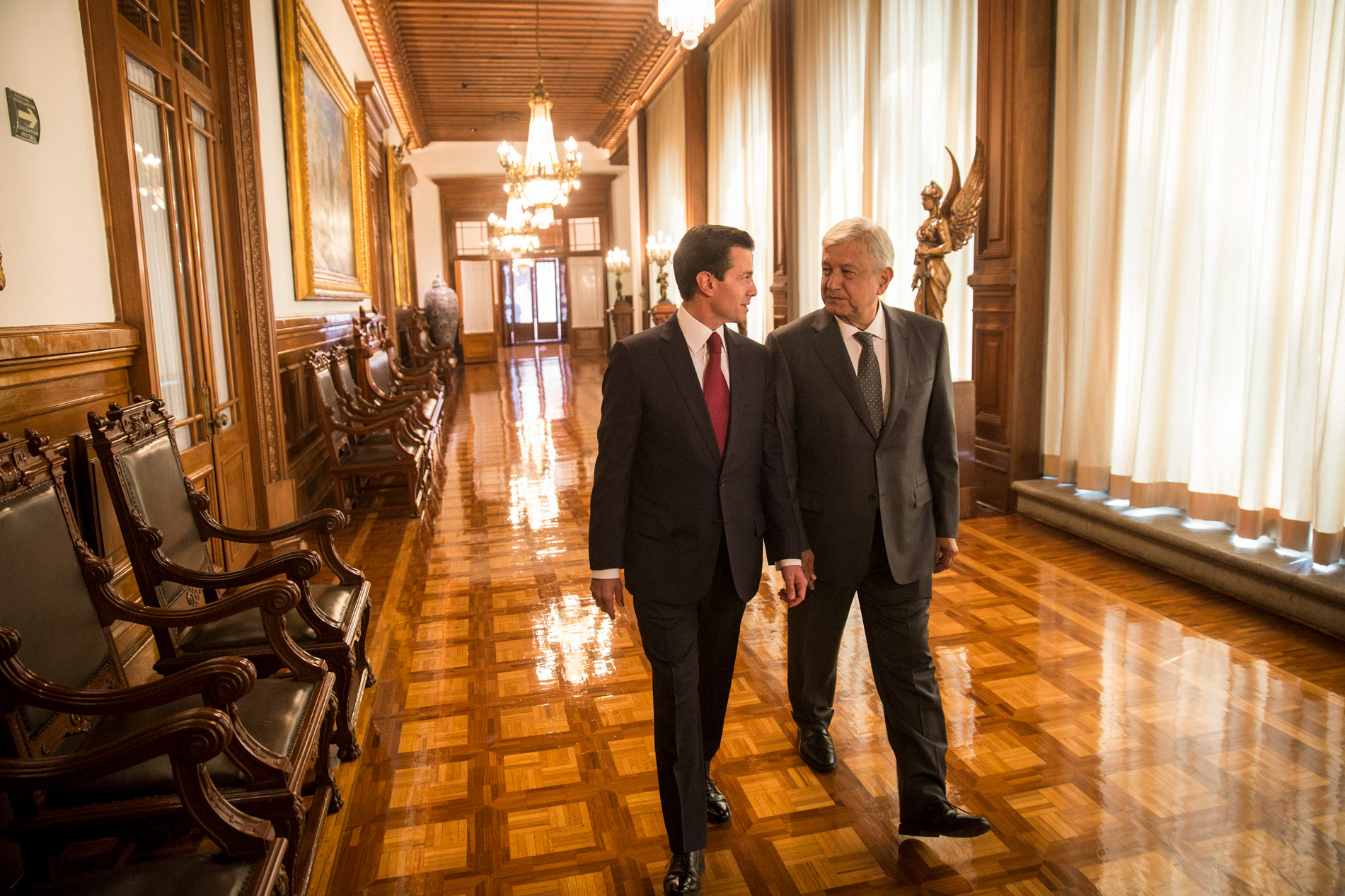
President Peña Nieto meets with López Obrador at the National Palace

Following his victory, on 2 July, López Obrador announced his transition team, comprising Alfonso Romo and Carlos Manuel Urzúa Macías for the economy; Héctor Vasconcelos and Marcelo Ebrard for foreign relations; Julio Scherer Ibarra, Olga Sánchez Cordero, and Tatiana Clouthier for domestic affairs; and César Yáñez Centeno Cabrera for communications.

On 3 July, he met incumbent president Enrique Peña Nieto at the National Palace, where they spoke on the North American Free Trade Agreement (NAFTA), the construction of the New International Airport for Mexico City (NAICM), energy reform, the budget, and security. In a departure from standard presidential security practices, López Obrador attended the meeting without the presence of bodyguards.

Once his victory was certified by the Federal Electoral Tribunal, López Obrador once again met with Peña Nieto on 9 August to formally begin the transition process. After the meeting, López Obrador announced that they had agreed to establish of the Secretariat of Security and Civilian Protection and the office of the Attorney General of Mexico.

The LXIV Legislature of the Mexican Congress, which convened on 1 September, laid the groundwork for López Obrador's proposed government restructuring. Key initiatives included the creation of the Secretariat of Security and Civilian Protection; transforming the Center for Investigation and National Security (CISEN) into the National Intelligence Centre (CNI); converting the Secretariat of Social Development (Sedesol) into the Secretariat of Welfare; and merging the Presidential General Staff (EMP) and the Presidential Guard Corps (CGP) with the Secretariat of National Defense. These changes were formalized on 1 December, following López Obrador's inauguration.

From 22 to 25 October, he held a nationwide referendum on whether or not the New International Airport for Mexico City was to be scrapped, citing that the project was rife with graft and a waste of taxpayer money. About 70% of the results voted against the continuation of the project. López Obrador insisted on expanding the Santa Lucía Air Force Base instead.

During the transition period, López Obrador and his team held meetings with Peña Nieto’s cabinet, as well as with the Consejo Coordinador Empresarial (CCE), the National Governors Conference (CONAGO), and presidential candidates José Antonio Meade and Ricardo Anaya. He also spoke with international figures such as Chrystia Freeland, Canada’s Minister of Foreign Affairs; Qiu Xhiaoqui, China’s Ambassador to Mexico; Theresa May, the Prime Minister of the United Kingdom; and members of the U.S. delegation attending his inauguration, including Mike Pompeo, Secretary of State; Steven Mnuchin, Secretary of the Treasury; Kirstjen Nielsen, Secretary of Homeland Security; and Jared Kushner, Senior Advisor and son-in-law to President Donald Trump.

== Inauguration ==
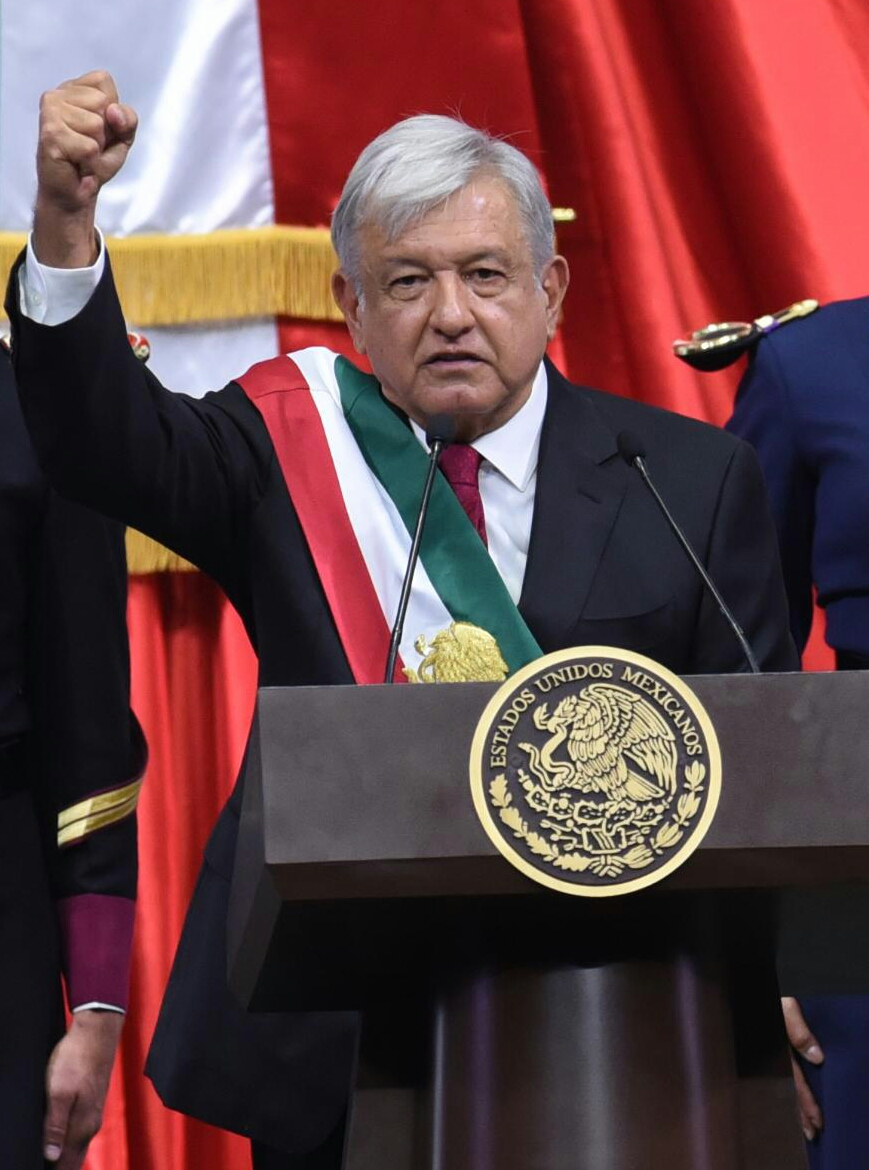
AMLO wearing the presidential sash during the inauguration ceremony.

On 1 December 2018, López Obrador was inaugurated at the Legislative Palace of San Lázaro at 11:00 CST. At the main podium, he was accompanied by Martí Batres, the President of the Senate; Enrique Peña Nieto, the outgoing president; Porfirio Muñoz Ledo, the President of the Chamber of Deputies; and Luis María Aguilar, the President of the Supreme Court of Justice. They were flanked by three cadets from each branch of the armed forces: one from the Heroic Military Academy, one female cadet from the Escuela Militar de Aviación, and one from the Heroica Escuela Naval Militar.

Following the formal welcome and announcement by the President of Congress, López Obrador read the oath outlined in Article 87 of the Constitution of Mexico. At the end of the phrase "the people have given me", he added the word "democratically". The transfer of the presidential sash then took place, with the outgoing president handing it over to the President of Congress, who then passed it to the new president. López Obrador was the first president to address Congress since the year 2000, following the brief inaugurations of Felipe Calderón and Enrique Peña Nieto, who had only taken the oath and then left. At the end of the speech, he was honored with the Himno Nacional Mexicano.

The foreign representation at the inauguration included the attendance of 14 heads of state and government:

- Felipe VI, King of Spain
- Miguel Díaz-Canel (President of Cuba)
- Evo Morales (President of Bolivia)
- Martín Vizcarra (President of Peru)
- Juan Orlando Hernández (President of Honduras)
- Jimmy Morales (President of Guatemala)
- Lenín Moreno (President of Ecuador)
- Iván Duque Márquez (President of Colombia)
- Brahim Gali (President of Sahrawi Arab Democratic Republic)
- Colville Young (Governor General of Belize)
- Julie Payette (Governor General of Canada)
- Danilo Medina (President of the Dominican Republic)
- Jovenel Moïse (President of Haiti)
- António Costa (Prime Minister of Portugal)

President of Venezuela Nicolás Maduro did not attend the inauguration ceremony, but did attend a reception in the National Palace. Representatives from 37 countries, including the United States, China, Singapore, Azerbaijan, Brazil, Russia, and Ukraine also attended.

A rally in support of López Obrador took place in the Zócalo of Mexico City, where representatives from 68 indigenous groups presented him with the bastón de mando, a traditional ceremonial staff. This symbolic gesture marked the first time a Mexican president had received the staff, signifying the recognition of López Obrador as a leader by the indigenous groups. The event concluded with López Obrador addressing an estimated 160,000 people.

On the same day as the inauguration, López Obrador broke several longstanding presidential traditions. He abolished the Presidential General Staff, an institution charged with protecting and safeguarding the President of Mexico and the First Lady of Mexico. He also opened the official residence of Los Pinos to the public and relocated the presidential offices to the National Palace.

== Cabinet ==
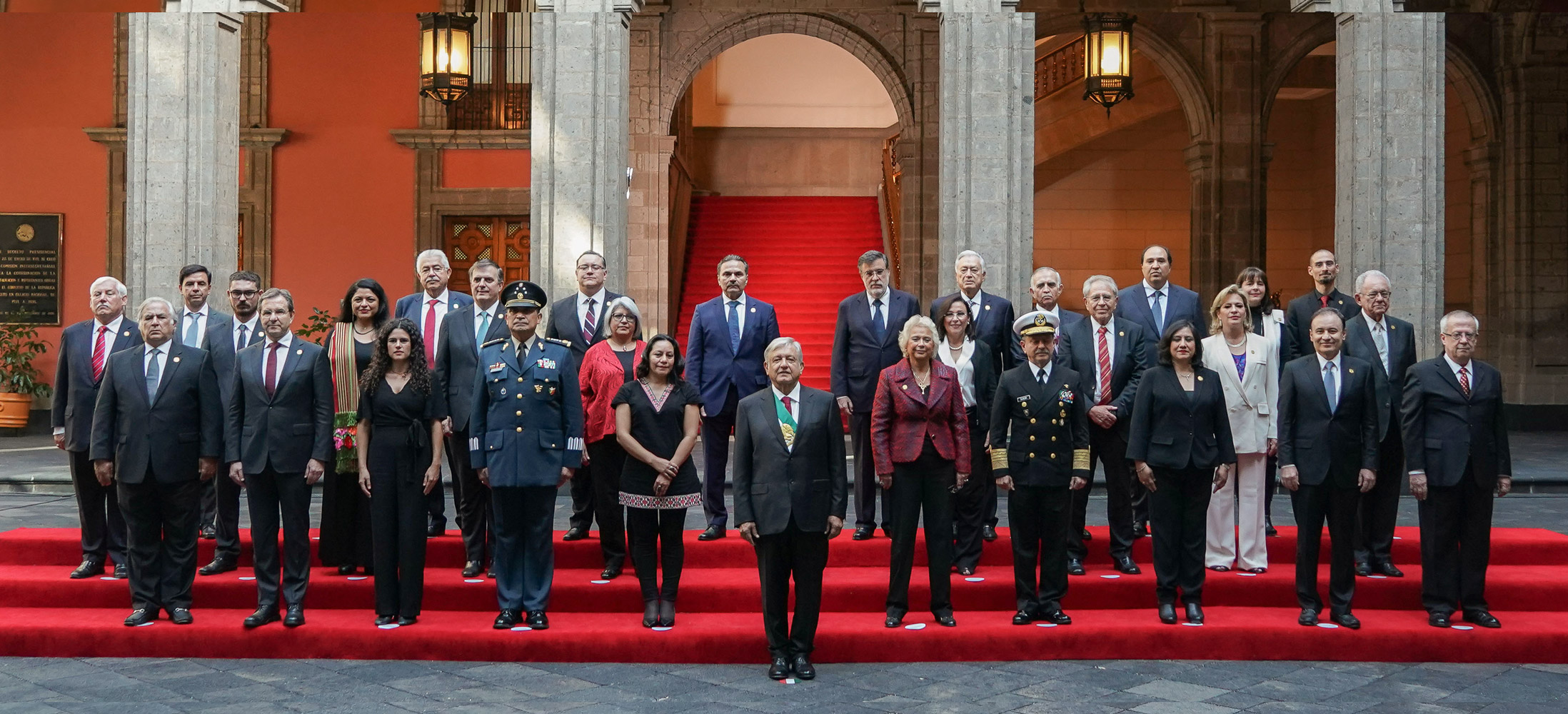

Cabinet of López Obrador
Office	Name	Term
President	Andrés Manuel López Obrador	2018–2024
Secretary of the Interior	Olga Sánchez Cordero	2018–2021
Adán Augusto López	2021–2023
Alejandro Encinas Rodríguez (acting)	2023
Luisa María Alcalde Luján	2023–2024
Secretary of Foreign Affairs	Marcelo Ebrard	2018–2023
Carmen Moreno Toscano (acting)	2023
Alicia Bárcena	2023–2024
Secretary of Defense	Luis Cresencio Sandoval	2018–2024
Secretary of the Navy	José Rafael Ojeda Durán	2018–2024
Secretary of Security	Alfonso Durazo	2018–2020
Rosa Icela Rodríguez	2020–2024
Secretary of Finance	Carlos Manuel Urzúa Macías	2018–2019
Arturo Herrera Gutiérrez	2019–2021
Rogelio Ramírez de la O	2021–present
Secretary of Welfare	María Luisa Albores	2018–2020
Javier May Rodríguez	2020–2022
Ariadna Montiel Reyes	2022–present
Secretary of Environment and Natural Resources	Josefa González Blanco Ortiz Mena	2018–2019
Víctor Manuel Toledo	2019–2020
María Luisa Albores	2020–2024
Secretary of Energy	Rocío Nahle García	2018–2023
Miguel Ángel Maciel Torres	2023–2024
Secretary of Economy	Graciela Márquez Colín	2018–2020
Tatiana Clouthier	2021–2022
Raquel Buenrostro Sánchez	2022–2024
Secretary of Agriculture and Rural Development	Víctor Villalobos	2018–2024
Secretary of Infrastructure	Javier Jiménez Espriú	2018–2020
Jorge Arganis Díaz Leal	2020–2022
Jorge Nuño Lara	2022–2024
Secretary of the Civil Service	Irma Eréndira Sandoval	2018–2021
Roberto Salcedo Aquino	2021–2024
Secretary of Public Education	Esteban Moctezuma	2018–2021
Delfina Gómez Álvarez	2021–2022
Leticia Ramírez Amaya	2022–2024
Secretary of Health	Jorge Alcocer Varela	2018–2024
Secretary of Tourism	Miguel Torruco Marqués	2018–2024
Secretary of Labor and Social Welfare	Luisa María Alcalde Luján	2018–2023
Marath Baruch Bolaños López	2023–present
Secretary of Agrarian, Land, and Urban Development	Román Meyer Falcón	2018–2024
Secretary of Culture	Alejandra Frausto Guerrero	2018–2024
Legal Counsel	Julio Scherer Ibarra	2018–2021
María Estela Ríos González	2021–2024

In December 2017, López Obrador released his cabinet listing, composed of eight men and eight women. The proposed cabinet remained mostly unchanged, with the exception of Héctor Vasconcelos, was initially chosen to serve as Secretary of Foreign Affairs but was later replaced by Marcelo Ebrard. In October 2018, López Obrador selected Luis Cresencio Sandoval as Secretary of Defense and José Rafael Ojeda Durán as Secretary of the Navy.

López Obrador proposed dispersing the cabinet throughout the country's states, with the objective of "promoting development throughout the national territory", while the Presidency, the Secretariat of National Defense, Secretariat of the Navy, the Secretariat of the Interior, Secretariat of Foreign Affairs, and the Secretariat of Finance and Public Credit remained in the capital.

=== Reforms ===
On 1 December 2018, the Secretariat of Security and Civilian Protection was created, with its responsibilities previously covered by the National Security Commission, an entity under the Secretariat of the Interior.

On 20 December 2018, due to the 2014 political-electoral reform, the Office of the Attorney General of the Republic (PGR) was dissolved, and the autonomous Office of the Attorney General of the Republic (FGR) was established outside the cabinet.

On 1 December 2018, the Secretariat of Social Development (SEDESOL) was renamed the Secretariat of Welfare and the Secretariat of Agriculture, Livestock, Rural Development, Fisheries, and Food was renamed the Secretariat of Agriculture and Rural Development. On 20 October 2021, the Secretariat of Communications and Transportation (SCT) was renamed the Secretariat of Infrastructure, Communications, and Transportation (SICT). The name changes did not affect the positions' responsibilities.

=== Cabinet changes ===
Throughout his term, López Obrador's cabinet experienced significant turnover. In the first four years of his administration, there were fifteen cabinet changes.

Pursuit of other public offices

- María Luisa Albores, the Secretary of Welfare, transitioned in 2020 to become to the Secretary of Environment and Natural Resources.
- Alfonso Durazo, the Secretary of Security, resigned in 2020 to run for the governorship of Sonora.
- Olga Sánchez Cordero. the Secretary of the Interior, resigned in 2021 to return to her Senate seat, which she had left to become part of the cabinet.
- Adán Augusto López and Marcelo Ebrard, the Secretaries of the Interior and Foreign Affairs, respectively, resigned in 2023 to compete for the presidential nomination of the Morena-PT-PVEM coalition.
- Rocío Nahle, the Secretary of Energy, resigned in 2023 to run for the governorship of Veracruz.

Loss in confidence in López Obrador

- Carlos Manuel Urzúa Macías, the Secretary of Finance, resigned in 2019 over disagreements with the president, citing concerns over economic policies and the appointment of unqualified individuals to key positions.
- Javier Jiménez Espriú, the Secretary of Infrastructure, resigned in 2020 as he disagreed with López Obrador's decision to entrust the operation of Mexico's ports and customs to the Navy.

== Domestic policy ==
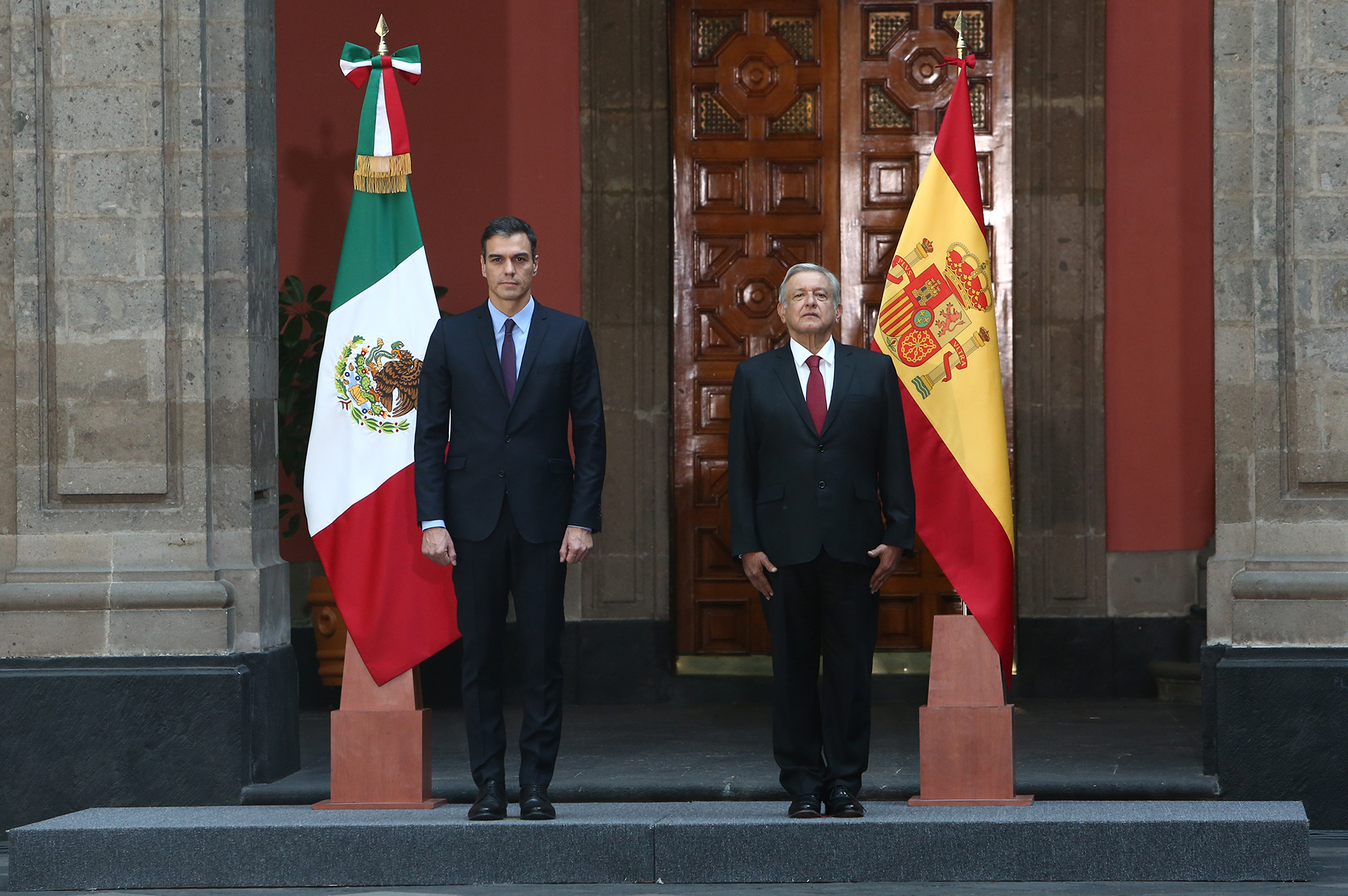
Prime Minister Pedro Sánchez and President López Obrador during the former's arrival ceremony.

López Obrador gave his Primer Informe del Gobierno (State of the Union address) on 1 September 2019, before 400 legislators, governors, and business leaders. During his hour-and-a-half speech, he emphasized how he has eliminated a lot of corruption and helped the poor. The speech generated 125,000 tweets and 27,000,000 viewers.

=== Economic policy ===
López Obrador's economic policies, characterized by a commitment to fiscal conservatism and social equity, focused on maintaining low public debt through spending cuts while increasing social spending. His policies aimed to reduce reliance on imports, strengthen state-run companies like Pemex and the CFE, and stimulate growth and employment through large-scale infrastructure projects. While the country maintained macroeconomic stability, his administration faced criticism for sluggish economic growth and poor investments in other sectors.

Upon taking office, López Obrador faced significant internal and external challenges, contributing to zero economic growth during his first year in office. These challenges included the excessive growth of public debt under the previous administration, conflicts with economic actors, the China–United States trade war, and Donald Trump's tariff policies. Some setbacks were self-inflicted, such as the cancellation of the Mexico City Texcoco Airport and reduced spending due to his austerity measures, which brought down construction investment. However, macroeconomic indicators remained stable, and the year also saw the ratification of the United States–Mexico–Canada Agreement.

In 2020, the Mexican economy was severely impacted by the COVID-19 pandemic and the subsequent stock market collapse, with GDP plummeting by 17% in the second quarter before rebounding 12.1% in the third quarter. The annual GDP forecast improved from -9.8% to -8.9%. López Obrador's commitment to austerity, even amidst the crisis, helped maintain a low budget deficit and public debt, earning him a reputation as a fiscal hawk. Throughout the post-pandemic period, the country's GDP grew by 4.1% in 2021 and 3.1% in 2022. The country also saw a rise in inflation, which peaked in mid-2022. Due to low debt, the Mexico had access to international bond markets, which, when combined with remittances, foreign investment, international reserves, and a strengthening peso—dubbed the "super peso"—boosted economic performance. Nearshoring, driven by the China–United States trade war, further bolstered economic performance. By 2023, the country had recovered from the pandemic, ranking as the 12th largest global economy with GDP growth of 3.2%, and by May 2024, it had the lowest unemployment rate in the OECD.

López Obrador's policies included significant investment in the southern regions of Mexico, which he characterized as a strategy for economic revitalization. Key projects included the Tren Maya, Interoceanic Corridor of the Isthmus of Tehuantepec, and the Dos Bocas Refinery. Near the end of his term, these investments had significantly stimulated regional economies, with Oaxaca and Quintana Roo emerging as some of the fastest-growing states in Mexico in terms of economic growth in 2023.

==== Austerity measures ====
Upon entering office, López Obrador implemented his proposed "Republican Austerity," which aimed to reduce spending on political privileges and non-essential government products and services. He eliminated presidential pensions and set a salary cap for government officials, ensuring no one could earn more than the president, subsequently slashing his salary by 60%. He opted not to reside in Los Pinos, the costly presidential complex with maintenance costs totaling around MXN $30 billion over the previous two administrations, instead moving the presidential offices to the National Palace and opening Los Pinos to the public.

López Obrador also auctioned various government planes and helicopters, including the presidential plane "José María Morelos y Pavón", which was sold to Tajikistan on 20 April 2023, for approximately MXN $1.658 billion. The proceeds funded hospitals in Tlapa, Guerrero, and Tuxtepec, Oaxaca.

López Obrador sought to reduce the bureaucratic system, which he believed primarily benefited elites and mismanaged public funds. His budgets often included spending cuts to various government agencies, including prosecutors and the public health system, leading to layoffs, salary reductions, and poorer services. To centralize operations and address the reduced workforce, López Obrador often utilized the military for infrastructure projects.

In February 2024, he proposed eliminating autonomous government agencies, arguing they duplicated the functions of certain cabinet ministries, and planned to absorb their responsibilities into the Mexican cabinet, which he claimed would save money and streamline government operations. The proposal faced criticism from many, including opposition members, who viewed it as retaliation against these autonomous agencies.

==== Labor ====
One of López Obrador's first actions was implementing a minimum wage increase, raising it from MXN $88.36 to MXN $102.68, marking a 16.2% rise—the largest increase since 1996. This adjustment had an immediate impact on workers' average salaries, which saw a 5.7% increase. His administration continued to increase the minimum wage annually, reaching MXN $248.93 by 2024. In February 2024, López Obrador proposed a constitutional amendment to ensure that the minimum wage consistently rises above the rate of inflation.

==== Taxation ====
Rather than pursuing comprehensive tax reform, López Obrador's administration focused on combating tax evasion. To attract and retain foreign investment, particularly from the United States, taxes were reduced in northern border areas, promoting economic expansion in these regions.

=== Military and security ===
Shortly after his inauguration, he dissolved the Estado Mayor Presidencial (Presidential Guard), an institution charged with protecting and safeguarding the President of Mexico and the First Lady of Mexico. In December 2018, López Obrador ordered the creation of a truth commission to re-examine one of the country's most notorious unsolved crimes: the kidnapping and presumed murder of 43 trainee teachers who disappeared after they were attacked by cartel gunmen and corrupt police officers. On 1 March 2019, López Obrador said that he would open up the General National Archives to show how intelligence agencies, particularly the CISEN, targeted activists and opposition groups during the Dirty War. During the presidency of López Obrador, the traditional Revolution Day civil-military-athletic parade on 20 November was reinstated that same year (2019) after five years.

Before becoming president, López Obrador campaigned on a promise to take the military off the streets of Mexico. In keeping with this promise, he released a plan to create a Mexican National Guard under control of the military and the Secretariat of Security and Civilian Protection (which was itself established by López Obrador) and would be in charge of "preventing and combating crime". It was the merger of elite parts of the Federal police, Military police, Navy, Chief of Staff's Guard and other top Mexican Security agencies Obrador stated that the creation of a new National Guard would be critical to solving Mexico's ongoing security crisis. On 28 February, the Congress of the Union voted to approve a 60,000-member agency, which was officially established on 30 June 2019. By early 2020, López Obrador restored the Naval Infantry Corps' role in fighting drug cartels, and he relied on the military for tasks such as law enforcement and construction.

Ovidio Guzmán López, a high-ranking member of the Sinaloa Cartel and son of Joaquín "El Chapo" Guzmán was briefly arrested in Culiacán by members of the National Guard in October 2019, setting off an operation which resulted in several deaths and Guzmán's release by authorities. Hours later, Ovidio Guzmán was freed, and President Obrador supported the decision in order to "prevent more bloodshed" as well as "a massacre".

=== Infrastructure ===
During his first year in office, the National Reconstruction Program (Spanish: Programa Nacional de Reconstrucción) was launched to support communities affected by the 2017 earthquakes. It allocated funds through various government agencies for the rehabilitation of housing, schools, health centers, small and medium-sized businesses, historical and cultural heritage sites, local infrastructure, and household goods, as well as for the expansion of risk studies and planning in areas that had not yet been assessed. By 2023, the program had reached 98.86% completion across 3,332 projects. Construction also began on community roads and highways in Oaxaca. At the end of 2019, a National Infrastructure Plan with public-private investment was presented, including 147 projects, especially in the fields of communications and transportation.

However, the infrastructure issues that attracted the most attention during his first year were the cancellation of the Texcoco Airport, the start of construction of the Felipe Ángeles International Airport at Santa Lucía Air Force Base, and the public consultation on the Tren Maya.

The strategy of the SEDATU for infrastructure development in urban and rural areas centered on the recovery of public spaces under a framework of social functionality, that is, projects intended to improve the social welfare of the communities involved. Its works prioritized basic infrastructure such as water, electricity, drainage, paving, public facilities, housing, and job creation. A total of 38 billion pesos was invested in urban improvement projects in 153 municipalities across 27 states, where 151 sports complexes, 293 parks, boardwalks, artistic and cultural spaces, 44 markets, 162 schools, 22 health centers, and 216 streets and potable water networks were built, benefiting 9.5 million people. One of the distinguishing features of these projects was the direct participation of community members, including the use of artisanal construction techniques; the performance of the secretariat under Román Meyer Falcón received recognition for some of its works.

==== Interoceanic Corridor of the Isthmus of Tehuantepec ====
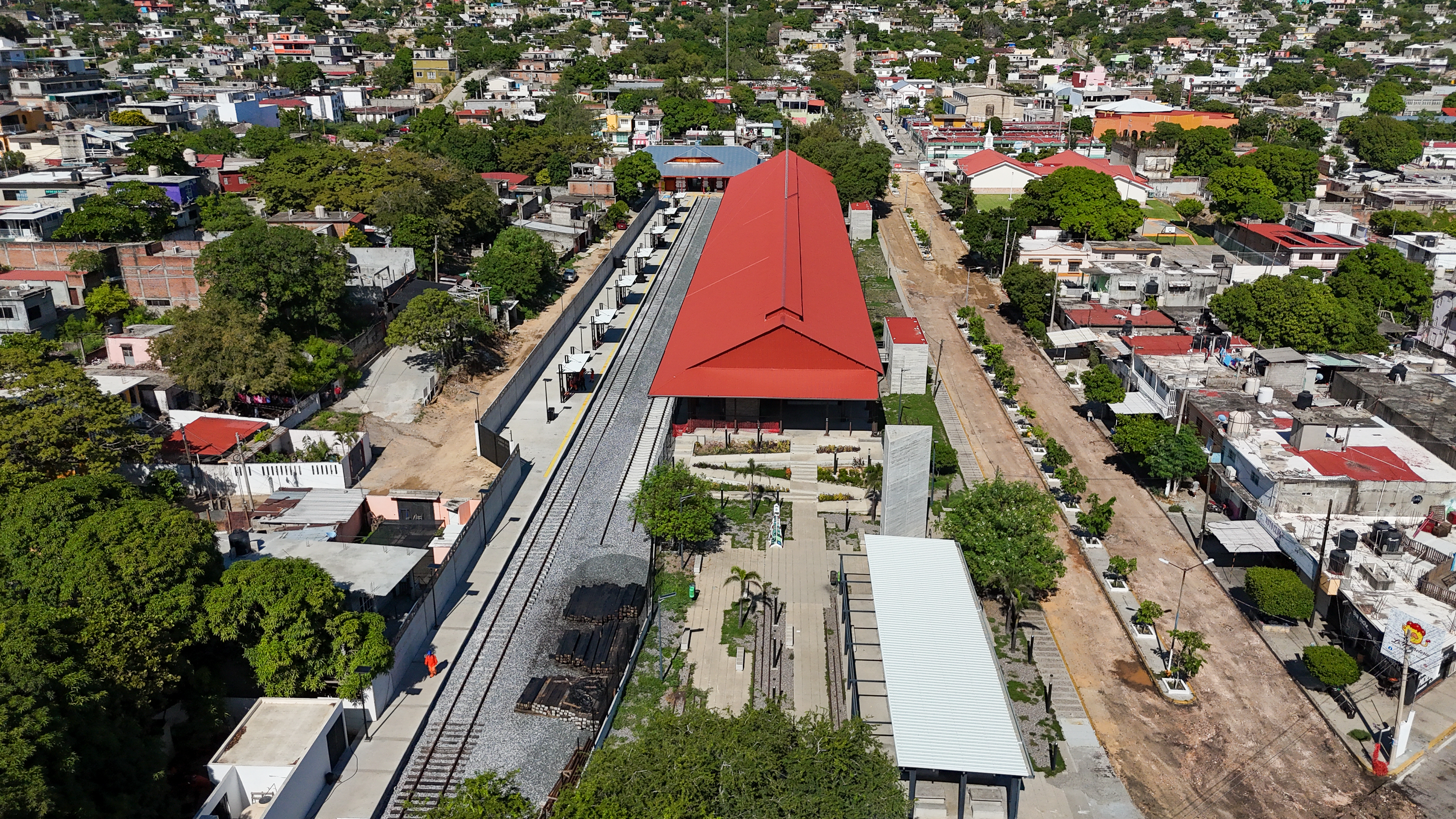
Salina Cruz station of the Isthmus Train

This corridor is intended to rival the commercial traffic currently concentrated in the Panama Canal. It is also intended to enable trade connections among Asia, the United States, and Europe, thereby turning Mexico into a global logistics platform. It is expected to boost trade with Asian countries, especially China. The project is also intended to attract companies to invest in the ten industrial parks planned for the region through which the corridor passes, with the aim of developing nearby communities.

On 22 December 2023, the first stage of the Isthmus Train was inaugurated, serving as the cornerstone of the Interoceanic Corridor of the Isthmus of Tehuantepec project.

==== Communications and transportation ====
The López Obrador administration implemented a program for the repair, expansion, and construction of new highways, bridges, and rural roads, especially in marginalized or hard-to-reach areas of the country. A total of 40,516 kilometers of highways were rehabilitated, especially toll-free roads, and 522 kilometers of new highways were built. In addition, 2,441 kilometers of artisanal rural roads were built in Oaxaca and Guerrero, along with other federally funded projects in eleven other states. Twenty-one vehicular bridges were also constructed in mountainous or rainy areas across seven states.

Since the beginning of his so-called Alternative Project for the Nation (Spanish: Proyecto Alternativo de Nación), López Obrador had proposed the return of passenger rail service, a mode of transportation and communication present in the country since the Porfiriato and largely abandoned following privatization under the government of Ernesto Zedillo. The government plan called for the use and expansion of existing rail lines in order to establish eleven routes: the Pacific Train, extending 4,700 kilometers from Chiapas to Baja California; El Chepe, 673 kilometers from Sinaloa to Chihuahua; the Western Train, 2,250 kilometers from Guerrero to Chihuahua; the Eastern Train, 2,000 kilometers from Guerrero to Coahuila and Nuevo León; the Transversal Train, 1,200 kilometers from Sinaloa to Tamaulipas; the Gulf Train, 1,650 kilometers from Tabasco to Tamaulipas; the Bajío Train, 1,500 kilometers from Veracruz to Jalisco, covering western Mexico; the Central Train, 1,300 kilometers from Veracruz to Jalisco, covering central Mexico; the Isthmus of Tehuantepec Railway, 300 kilometers; the Oaxaca Train, 750 kilometers; and, as the opening stage of the project, the Tren Maya, covering 1,800 kilometers. The plan, projected through 2050, began under this administration with works to adapt or modernize existing rail lines, especially in suburban areas.

As part of efforts to guarantee free internet access, a pledge included in López Obrador's electoral platform, the Federal Electricity Commission created a division tasked with building the fiber-optic infrastructure required to support the plan. A total of 10,979 antennas were installed to provide network access to schools, parks, health centers, and other public sites.

On 26 December 2023, the first commercial flight of the renewed state-owned airline Mexicana de Aviación took place, specifically between the AIFA and the Tulum International Airport. The airline, which had been privatized in the 1990s and ceased operations in 2010, was reacquired by the federal government on 6 January 2023.

===== Felipe Ángeles International Airport =====
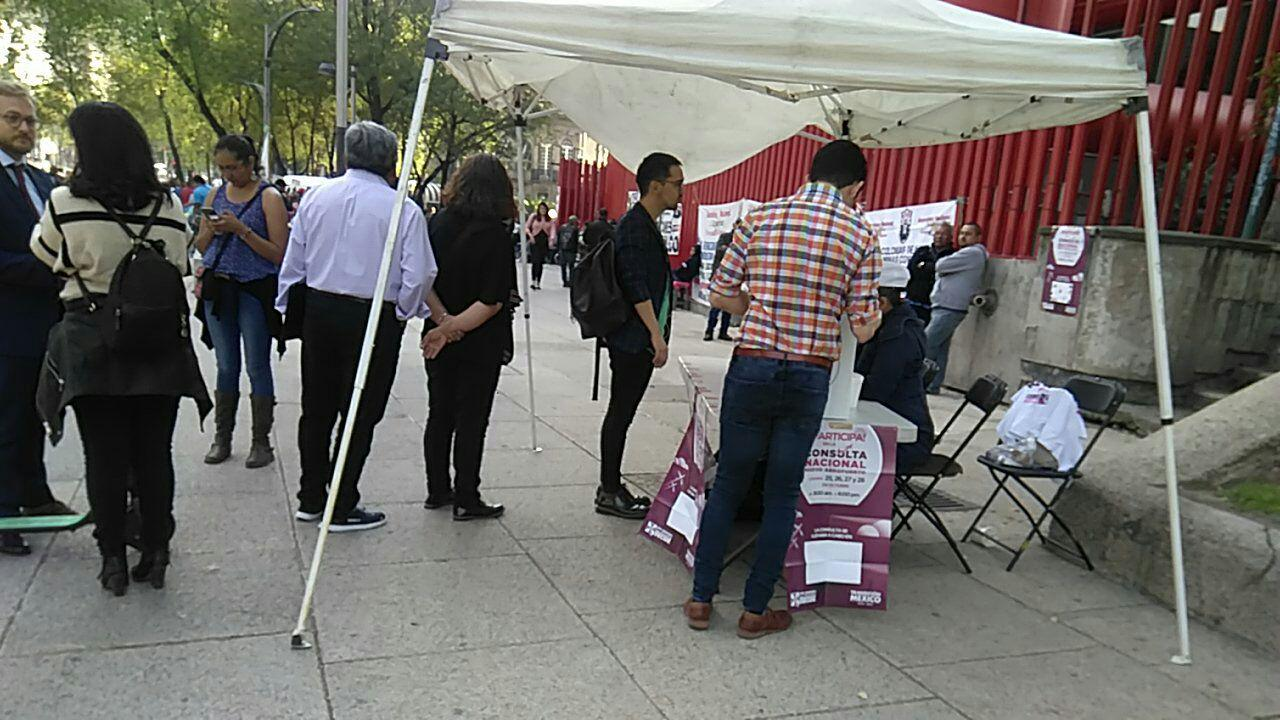
National consultation on the NAICM

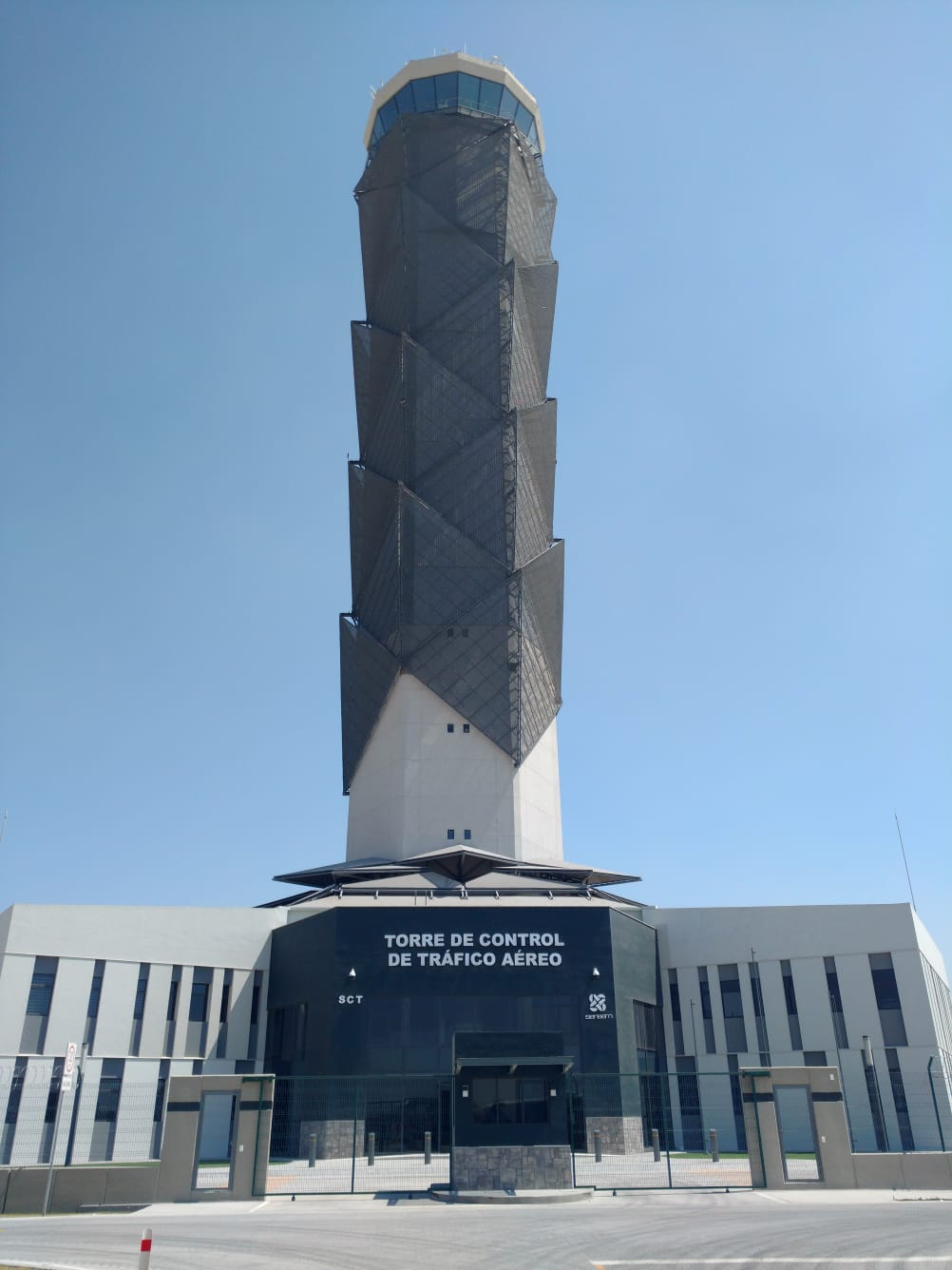
Control tower of AIFA

Before the new administration took office, from 22 to 25 October 2018, a public consultation was held on whether the New Mexico City International Airport—then under construction—should be canceled. The stated reasons were that the project was allegedly marred by corruption, illicit investment, and wasteful spending of taxpayers' money. Around 70% of participants voted against continuing the project. As he had during the campaign, López Obrador instead insisted on developing Santa Lucía Air Force Base.

On 3 January 2019, Secretary of Communications and Transportation Javier Jiménez Espriú announced the definitive suspension of the airport works, thereby formalizing the official cancellation of the NAICM and clearing the way for the construction of Santa Lucía International Airport, which would be managed by the Secretariat of National Defense.

The airport was intended to relieve congestion at Mexico City International Airport. According to supporters of the project, its strategic geographic location would also allow it to connect Europe, Asia, and Africa with the Americas. It includes biometric security systems and protections against sabotage, terrorism, and natural phenomena such as hurricanes, floods, and even volcanic eruptions. With more than 273,000 square meters of construction, AIFA was projected to be able to serve 2.4 million users with 60 daily operations.

===== Tren Maya =====
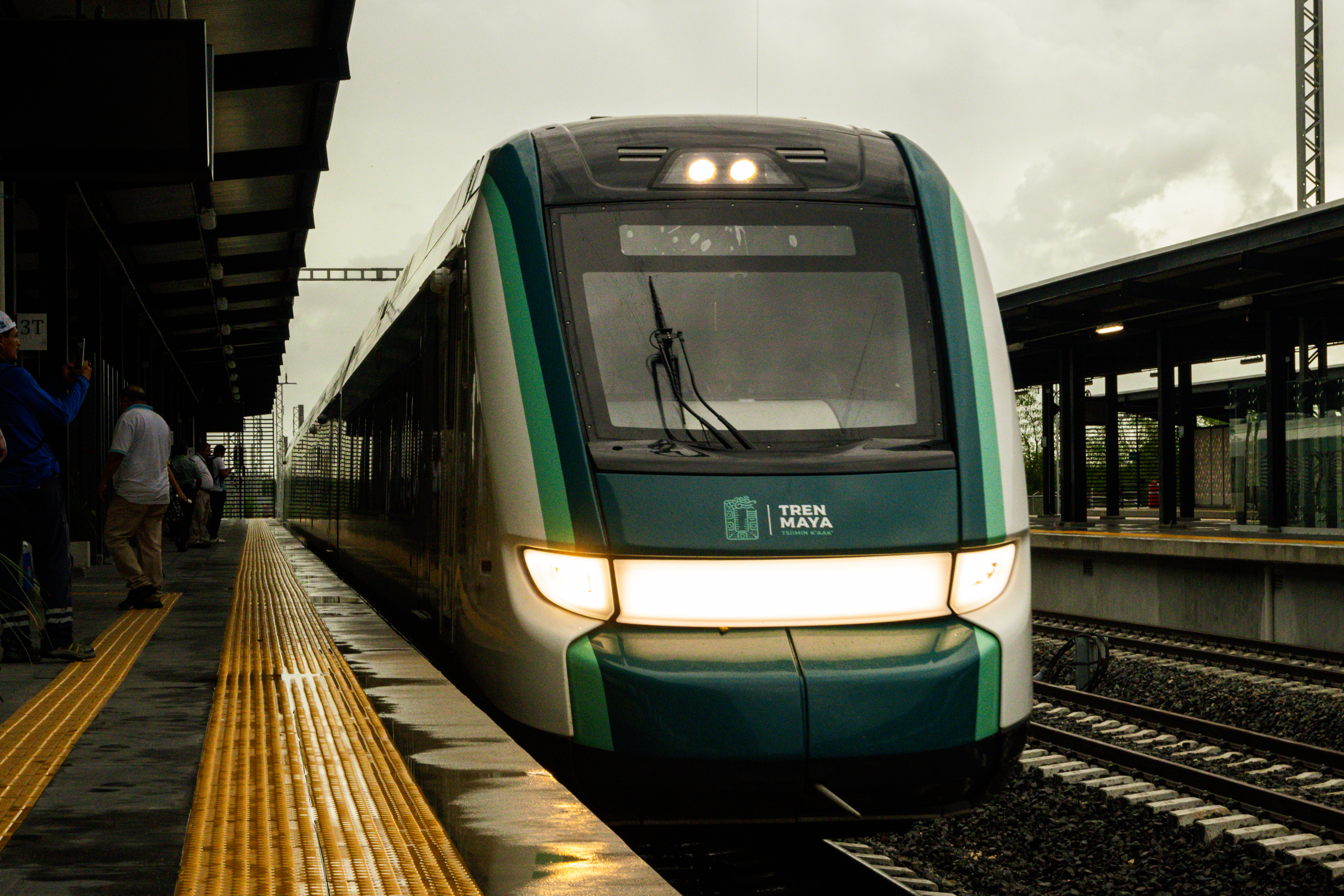
Tren Maya

The project is intended to strengthen land-use planning in the region and expand the tourism industry. It is expected to generate economic activity and increase connectivity in the Yucatán Peninsula by allowing cargo and passengers to be moved efficiently. It is also intended to facilitate connections with national airports, transport workers and goods throughout the Riviera Maya, and link the state's micro-regions with the six cities that would have train stations.

As part of the infrastructure associated with the Tren Maya, construction of the Felipe Carrillo Puerto International Airport in Tulum, Quintana Roo, began in June 2022, and it was inaugurated on 1 December 2023. It is the largest airport on the Yucatán Peninsula, with a projected capacity of 5.5 million passengers.

On 15 December 2023, with the opening of the Campeche–Cancún section, and on 31 December of the same year, with the inauguration of the Cancún–Palenque section, the first two stages of the Tren Maya were completed. Together with the 1,200 kilometers of the Isthmus of Tehuantepec Railway and the 1,554 kilometers of the Tren Maya, the López Obrador administration was projected to leave behind 2,754 kilometers of passenger rail lines, restoring a mode of transport that had been discontinued during the government of Ernesto Zedillo.

==== Energy and water infrastructure ====
The López Obrador administration completed the largest solar energy park in Latin America, located in Puerto Peñasco, Sonora; upgraded the turbines of 16 hydroelectric plants; and began construction of the Santa María Dam in El Rosario, Sinaloa, which was inaugurated on 18 December 2023. It also completed the construction of the El Zapotillo aqueduct, intended to bring potable water to the states of Jalisco and Guanajuato; El Purgatorio, intended to bring potable water to the metropolitan area of Toluca; and Milpillas, intended to bring potable water to the metropolitan area of Zacatecas. In addition, the first stage of the El Cuchillo II aqueduct, intended to bring water to the Monterrey metropolitan area, was put into operation. The latter project was declared a matter of national security in 2022 during the region's water crisis.

The main line of action promoted in his political project for infrastructure was related to the state-owned oil company Pemex: the rehabilitation of the six existing refineries and the construction of two more. First, 62 billion pesos was invested in the refurbishment of the existing refineries; the Olmeca Refinery was built at a cost of US$11 billion; and instead of constructing a second new refinery, the government acquired the Deer Park Refinery in Texas. The renovation project was later expanded to include the construction of two coking plants.

===== Olmeca Refinery =====
The new refinery was intended to increase domestic crude processing and fuel production. Although it would not fully meet domestic demand, its construction was expected to help reduce fuel imports. According to the Secretariat of Energy, the project generated 200,000 direct and indirect jobs. In addition to gasoline, the refinery was also intended to produce liquefied petroleum gas, propylene for use in the petrochemical industry, butylenes, and byproducts such as coke and sulfur.

=== Human development public policies ===
==== Science and technology ====
The administration approached science and technology public policy through two lines broadly similar to those applied in social policy: first, beginning anti-corruption processes targeting public institutions and trust funds accused of opacity or mismanagement; and second, reforming the legal framework in order to establish a socially oriented approach to the plans, programs, and projects of Conacyt.

In the second area, a new science and technology law was enacted, together with an organic law restructuring the public body responsible for the sector. As a result of the reform, the National Council of Humanities, Sciences and Technologies (CONAHCYT) was created. As its name indicates, it expanded the agency's remit to include the humanities. The new law also abandoned the previous exclusive focus on economic activity in state policy and diversified it toward a broader social-benefit approach, with a governing board made up of most cabinet secretariats and tasked with designing its activities while prioritizing social problems to which scientific research and technological innovation could contribute solutions. Despite the elimination of trust funds, by 2023 a total of 128,950 postgraduate or researcher scholarships had been awarded.

The most prominent scientific projects directly carried out by the government through CONAHCYT took place in the context of the COVID-19 pandemic. The first was the design and production of mechanical ventilators for critically ill patients; the other was the development of a domestic vaccine against the disease, the so-called Patria vaccine, which led to the reactivation of the Mexican state-owned company Birmex, responsible for the development of vaccines and medicines and which had been dismantled shortly before the 2009 influenza pandemic.

==== Sport ====
López Obrador's political platform regarding sport and physical culture in Mexico revolved around three proposals. First, to promote mass participation in sports activities, both recreational and competitive, as part of a comprehensive social policy strategy in which sport would contribute to solving national problems such as public health, social cohesion, addiction, antisocial behavior, and even urban traffic congestion through the promotion of bicycles as transportation. Second, to combat corruption in elite organized sport in order to secure resources and planning for the Olympic cycle (Central American and Caribbean Games–Pan American Games–World championships–Olympic Games), with the direct participation of athletes in coordination with Conade, sports federations, and private enterprise. Third, to create the conditions and strategies necessary to promote development processes in grassroots sports by prioritizing youth and children's sports in schools, communities, municipalities, and the National Olympiad as a means of identifying talent, as well as by working on the training of coaches, physical education teachers, and instructors.

In 2021, the creation of the Technological High Schools for Sports Education and Promotion (Spanish: Bachilleratos Tecnológicos de Educación y Promoción Deportiva) was announced. They were to offer four courses of study: comprehensive boxing training, comprehensive athletics training, comprehensive baseball training, and sports physical therapy, initially with seven campuses in Mexico City, Sonora, Campeche, Veracruz, the State of Mexico, and Tlaxcala.

Direct intervention by the federal government allowed contracts with the FIA and the NFL to be renewed, thereby preserving the Mexican Grand Prix and the annual NFL game at Estadio Azteca, respectively. The government also guaranteed support, in terms of governmental responsibilities such as road infrastructure, public security, and airports, for the organization of the 2026 FIFA World Cup, which, although it would take place after the end of his term, was expected to have its host-city logistics finalized by 2024.

Up to 2024, the administration granted various forms of support to athletes who had distinguished themselves at international events, including 222 million pesos to participants in the 2019 Pan American Games, 111 million pesos to medal-winning or otherwise distinguished athletes from the 2020 Summer Olympics, individualized support to medalists at the 2023 Central American and Caribbean Games, 500 million pesos in prizes and incentives to Mexican athletes at the 2023 Pan American Games, and 78 million pesos to medalists, Olympic diploma recipients, and participants generally at the 2024 Summer Olympics.

The administration decided to allocate resources from the Institute to Return Stolen Goods to the People to elite athletes. As in other policy areas, special funds and trusts were eliminated amid accusations of opacity and corruption, with 500 million pesos instead being distributed directly to 950 athletes and coaches. Authorities justified this measure by referring to situations in which international federations had suspended or failed to recognize local governing bodies, as occurred with the Mexican swimming federation's suspension by FINA.

==== Culture ====
The cultural component of López Obrador's political project consisted of six basic elements. First, to broaden the study and dissemination of national culture, as well as artistic expression and appreciation, reducing inequality in access for vulnerable groups. Second, to develop and expand a comprehensive strategy of artistic and cultural education at all educational levels, in sectoral institutions, and in community or private spaces. Third, to make cultural dissemination and professional artistic practice part of social policy, in order to address broader problems such as social disintegration, addiction, antisocial behavior, and educational lag. Fourth, to place special emphasis on protecting both tangible and intangible cultural heritage, historical and contemporary, through its study, dissemination, and promotion. Fifth, to harness the economic potential of the cultural industry through the professionalization of the sector. And sixth, to enrich cultural diversity by prioritizing creative groups facing deprivation or vulnerability.

As part of its broader austerity and anti-corruption program, as in the fields of science and sport, the administration's first actions in culture were aimed at eliminating opaque or non-essential funds and trust funds that had supported cultural dissemination projects and artistic creation. As in the other two sectors, assistance was instead delivered directly.

One of the proposals implemented in the areas of cultural dissemination and artistic creation was the National Community Culture Program (Spanish: Programa Nacional de Cultura Comunitaria), intended to promote the exercise of cultural rights among individuals, groups, and communities in contexts of social vulnerability. The program has four lines of action: Missions for Cultural Diversity, Territories of Peace, Creative Seedbeds, and Creative Communities and Social Transformation.

- Missions for Cultural Diversity had carried out 651 cultural events by 2023 in 33 municipalities across three states, with the participation of more than 4,300 artists and more than 4,800 workshop instructors.
- Territories of Peace had worked with more than 1,000 incarcerated persons in 11 penitentiaries, as well as more than 3,000 migrants in shelters and migration stations.
- Creative Seedbeds had benefited more than 17,000 children and young people through 300 permanent programs in visual arts, performing arts, audiovisual media, photography, music, and community radio.
- Creative Communities and Social Transformation had supported more than 100 community cultural collectives with funding and technical assistance for artistic and cultural projects intended to contribute to social transformation.

The Secretariat of Culture implemented two notable programs in response to contingent problems affecting cultural heritage: one to repatriate Mexican archaeological pieces taken out of the country, and another to enforce intellectual property rights over textile designs. The Chapultepec and Texcoco Ecological-Cultural Parks were inaugurated. The Fondo de Cultura Económica distributed 2,100,000 books from 21 titles free of charge. The National Coordination of Historical and Cultural Memory (Spanish: Coordinación Nacional de Memoria Histórica y Cultural) was created to disseminate works and organize commemorative events related to major historical milestones such as the 700th anniversary of the founding of Tenochtitlan, the 500th anniversary of the fall of the Aztec Empire, and the 200th anniversary of the consummation of Mexican independence, as well as to create a digital archive of 200,000 historical and cultural documents and works. The National Reconstruction Program, the strategy responding to damage caused by the 2017 earthquakes, accelerated and completed most interventions on damaged historical and cultural heritage buildings, reaching by 2023 a total of 2,386 restored properties out of 3,269 damaged, including the most extensive intervention at the Mexico City Metropolitan Cathedral since 1990.

=== Environment ===
Among the ecological initiatives was the work of the National Commission of Natural Protected Areas (CONANP), which is responsible for conserving and managing Mexico's natural heritage. CONANP expanded the country's protected areas, strengthened social participation, and promoted sustainable development projects within protected regions. Among its actions were the establishment of three new protected natural areas: Jaguar Park in Tulum, Quintana Roo; Nopoló National Park in Loreto, Baja California Sur; and the Sierra San Miguelito biosphere reserve in San Luis Potosí. The number of such declarations increased over the course of the six-year term, reaching a total of 43 new protected natural areas by early 2024, the highest figure in the country's history.

The government also promoted renewable energy and energy transition through the installation of solar panels, wind turbines, and hydroelectric plants in various regions of the country. These initiatives were presented as efforts to reduce dependence on fossil fuels and greenhouse gas emissions, while also generating green jobs and savings for consumers.

=== Drug war ===
One of his campaign promises in relation to the Mexican drug war was a controversial "strategy for peace": a program to give amnesty to all Mexicans involved in the production and trafficking of drugs. It was proposed as a way to stop the drug trade and the turf violence that spread as a result as well as act as a deterrent to other people from following that path, particularly low-income young people and poor farmers. President López Obrador pointed out that contrary to his proposed plan, past approaches failed because they were based on a misunderstanding of the core problem, which according to him, is the country's social disparities that resulted from economic policies of past presidencies in the years prior that caused the drug problem in the first place which in turn have turned the country into a hotbed of the illegal drug trade globally. On 30 January 2019, López Obrador declared the end of the Mexican drug war, stating that he will now focus on reducing spending and will direct military/police/National Guard efforts on armed gasoline theft rings (locally known as huachicolero) that have been stealing more than 70 thousand barrels of oil, diesel and gasoline daily from the nation's gas pipelines.

In 2023, President López Obrador announced that he was open to a peace agreement with the cartels. The announcement came after an activist published an open letter calling the cartels to stop the practice of forced disappearance.

=== Lithium reserves ===
In April 2022, Congress passed a law, prohibiting private companies from obtaining licences for lithium extraction. In February 2023, the president signed a decree nationalising the lithium reserves of Mexico, declaring it the property of the nation. López Obrador noted the enormous importance of the natural resource for the rechargeable battery industry and plans to cooperate with Bolivia and Peru in the technological sphere, as well as to adopt the Bolivian model of lithium mining, wherein companies have to commit to establish a complete value creation chain.

=== Mining reform ===
In early May 2023, the Senate passed with 66 votes in favor and none in opposition, a new law regulating the mining sector. According to Senator Napoleón Gómez Urrutia, the law is supposed to curtail privileges the sector enjoys, since the last law concerning mining regulation passed in 1992, which relaxed laws on the sector. The law reduces the period of validity of extraction permits from 50 to 30 years, obligates companies to consult with affected communities and present a restoration plan for the impacted environment and outright outlaws new permits in regions with a shortage of water.

=== Reform of the National Electoral Institute ===
In February 2023, a controversial law reforming the National Electoral Institute (INE) was passed by the Congress of the Union. The reform entails cuts to the funding and personnel of the INE, forcing the dismissal of about a third of its employees but saving the state about Mex$3.5bn.

=== Espionage on government employees ===
At the end of May 2023, the New York Times published a story on the espionage of the state secretary for human rights Alejandro Encinas Rodríguez via the Pegasus spy software, which the media outlet connected with ongoing investigations of Encinas on the conduct and actions of the armed forces. In a press conference, López Obrador denied any involvement on the part of the Secretariat of National Defense (SEDENA), while stating he did not know who was responsible for the espionage. Encinas is a long time political ally of López Obrador, who already supported him two decades ago during his mayorship.

== Foreign policy ==
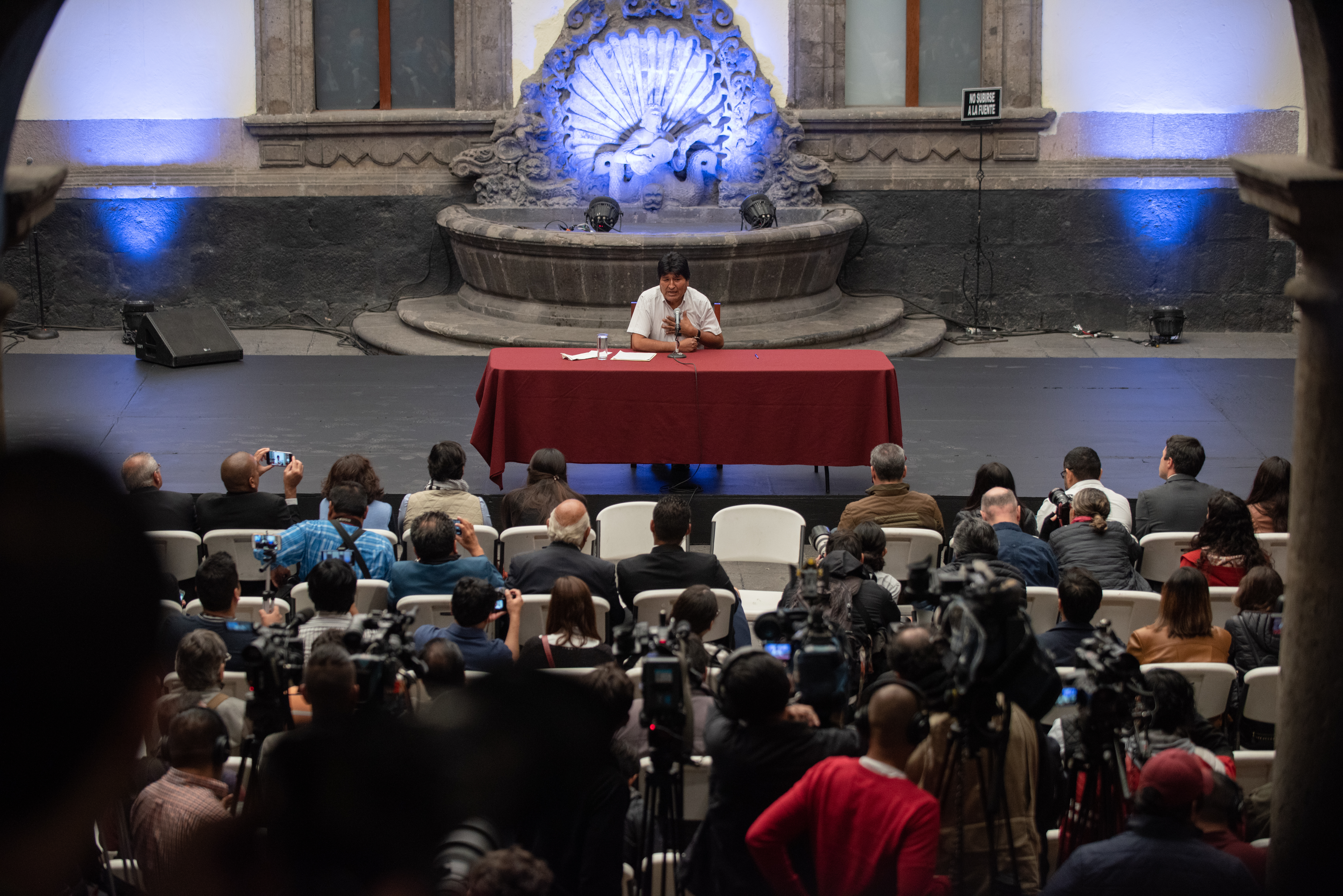
Evo Morales at a press conference at the Museum of Mexico City

As of December 2019, he has not visited any foreign country since assuming office, often saying that "The best foreign policy is domestic policy". Despite this, in his first year, he had hosted multiple foreign leaders in Mexico City, including Pedro Sánchez of Spain in January and Miguel Diaz Canel of Cuba and Carlos Alvarado Quesada of Costa Rica in October.

During the 2019 Bolivian political crisis, President Evo Morales was granted the right of political asylum by Foreign Minister Marcelo Ebrard at López Obrador's direction. López Obrador justified his actions in a press conference the following day, taking the position alongside other governments such as Cuba, Venezuela, and Argentina that Morales was the victim of a political coup d'état. Morales later went to Argentina, and the Bolivian government issued a warrant for his arrest on 18 December. Days later, Bolivia deployed a large number of security forces outside the embassy and ambassador's residence in La Paz, and the Mexican government claimed they were intimidating, harassing, and photographing diplomats.

On 8 July 2020, he made his first foreign trip as President to Washington, D.C., where he met with President Donald Trump at the White House.

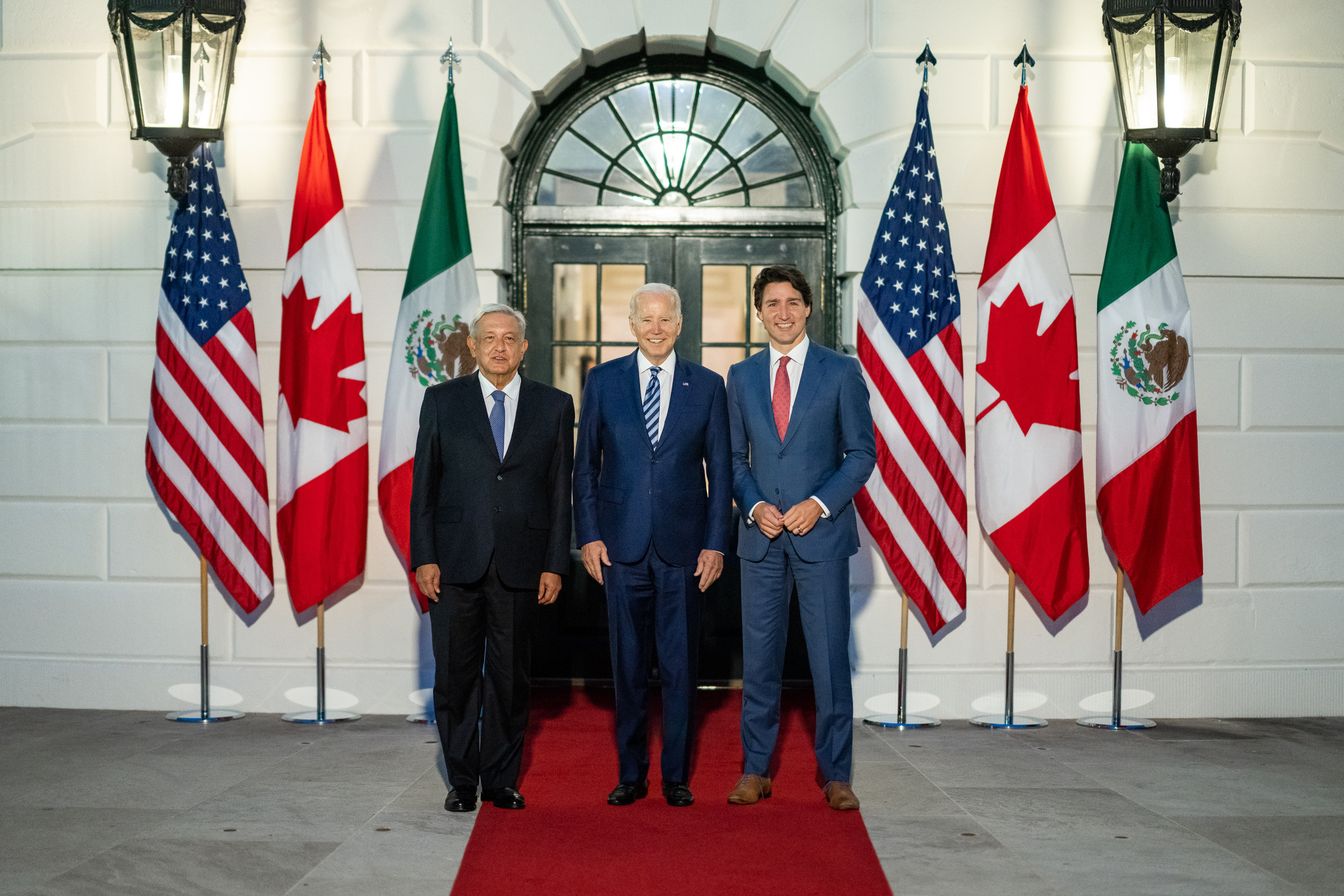
López Obrador with U.S. President Joe Biden and Canadian Prime Minister Justin Trudeau at the North American Leaders' Summit in November 2021

On 18 November 2021, President Joe Biden hosted Prime Minister Justin Trudeau of Canada and President Andrés Manuel López Obrador of Mexico at the White House for the first North American Leaders' Summit (NALS) since 2016.

In 2021 and 2022, López Obrador advocated for a regional union, comprising the nations of the Americas, resembling the European Union.

In March 2023, López Obrador defended former U.S. president Donald Trump against a potential indictment, saying that "Right now, former President Trump is declaring that they are going to arrest. If that were the case...it would be so that his name doesn't appear on the ballot.” The same month, he lashed out at the United States, claiming the country is "anti-democratic" in seeking to arrest Julian Assange and deny Trump an opportunity to seek re-election. He also referenced the allegations that the U.S. is responsible for the 2022 Nord Stream pipeline sabotage instead of Russia, saying "If we are talking about acts of violence, how is it that an award-winning journalist in the United States claims that the US government sabotaged the gas pipeline from Russia to Europe?", and criticized the fentanyl epidemic in the U.S.

=== Official international visits ===
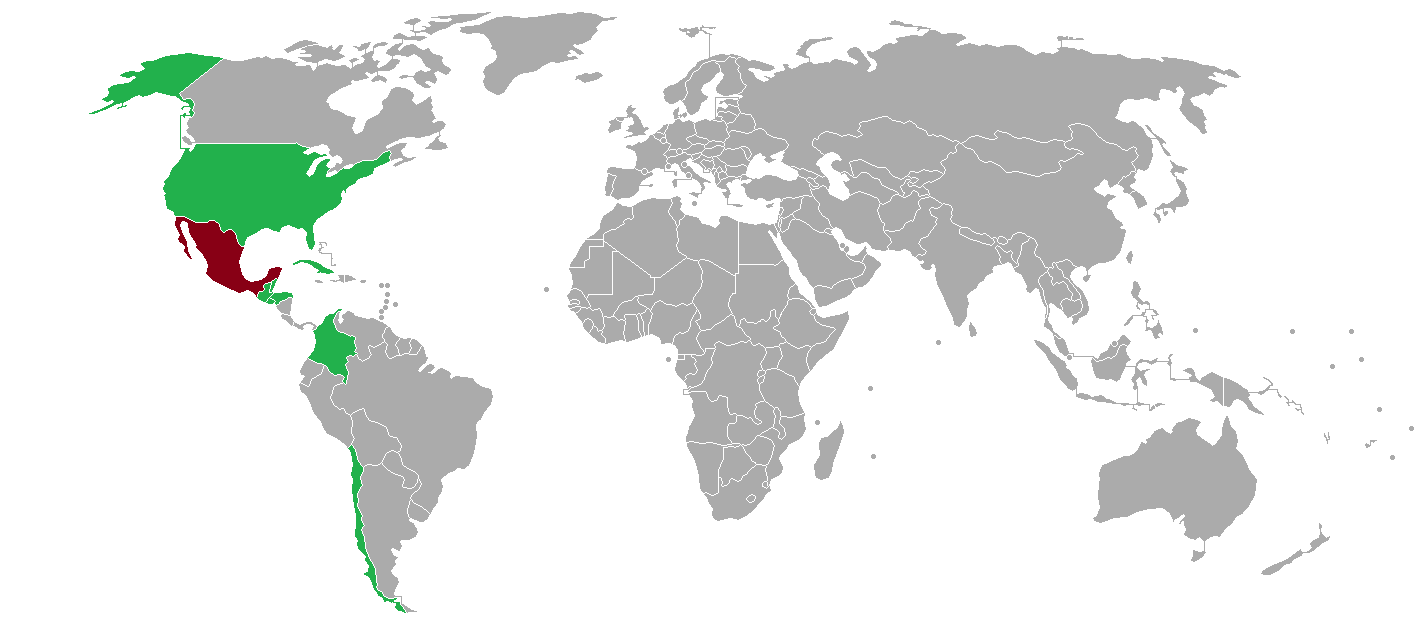
Countries visited by López Obrador during his presidency (in dark green), and Mexico (in brown).

According to Article 88 of the Constitution of Mexico, the president may leave the country for up to seven days by informing the Senate or, where applicable, the Permanent Commission in advance of the reasons for the absence, as well as of the results of the measures carried out. For absences longer than seven days, permission from the Senate or the Permanent Commission is required.

The discourse of Andrés Manuel López Obrador, in which he stated that an adequate exercise of domestic policy becomes a factor of international recognition, and therefore of foreign policy, was the main reason that kept him, in his first year in office, from undertaking any working tour or state visit abroad, including the usual international summits normally attended by his predecessors during the year: the Davos Forum in Switzerland, the annual summit of heads of state and government at the United Nations General Assembly in New York, the 2019 G20 Osaka summit, and the meeting of heads of state of the Pacific Alliance; he had also already confirmed his absence from the 2019 APEC summit in Chile, which was cancelled days before it was to be held. To this were added his refusals to attend international events to which he had been invited, such as the commemoration of the centenary of the International Labour Organization in Switzerland and the inauguration of President of Argentina Alberto Fernández.

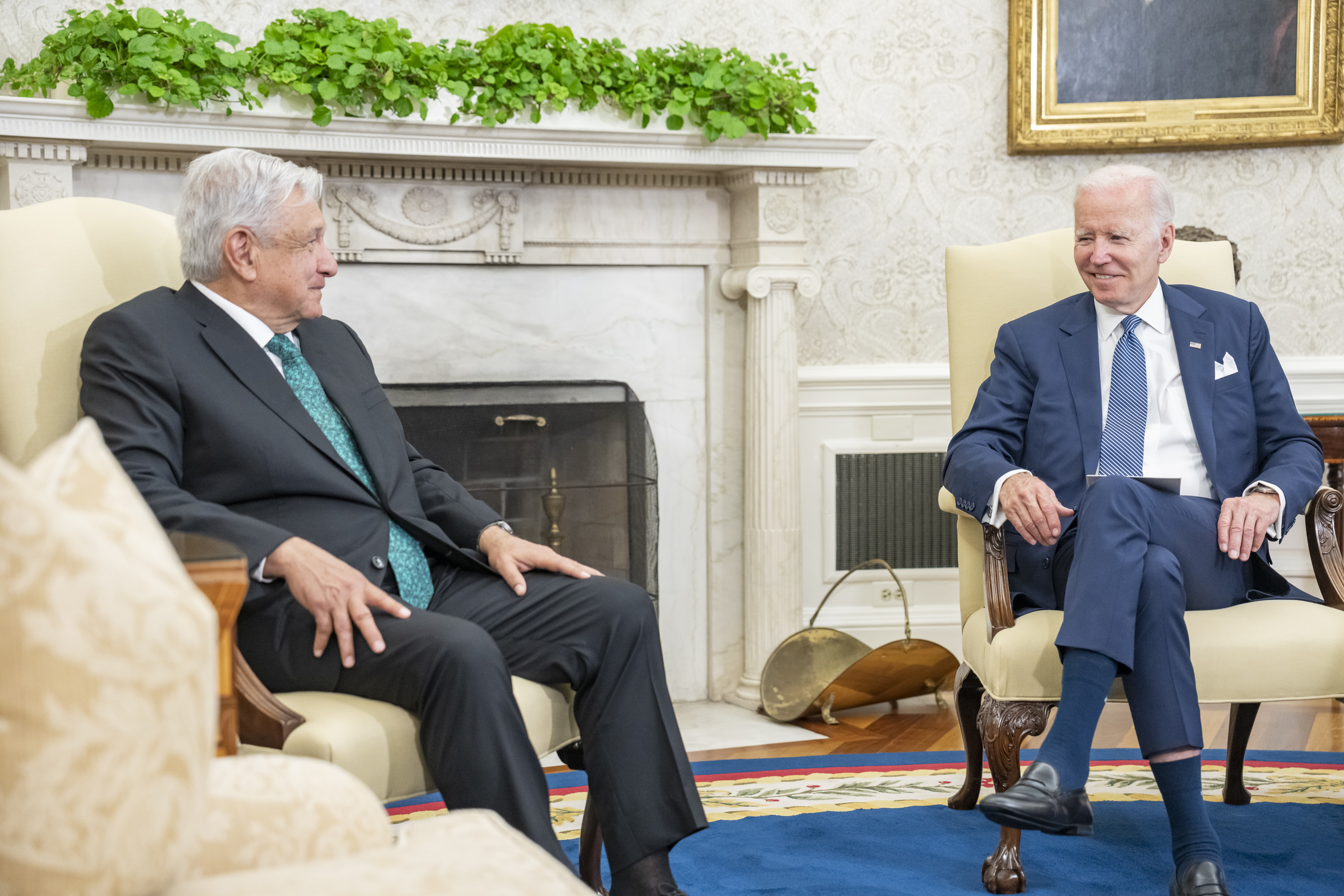
López Obrador with Joe Biden at a meeting, 2022.

In 2020, President López Obrador made his first official trip abroad. On 8 July he visited Washington, D.C., the capital of the United States, to meet with President Donald Trump, in celebration of the entry into force of the United States–Mexico–Canada Agreement; Canadian prime minister Justin Trudeau had also been invited to the meeting, but did not attend because he was dealing with the pandemic in his country.

He returned to the northern neighbor twice in 2021, both in November, the first time to open the sessions of the United Nations Security Council, במסגרת the rotating presidency held by Mexico that month, and the second for a working meeting in Washington with President Biden. Particularly notable during his visit to the UN was his speech and proposal to establish a global welfare system promoted by the UN and financed through contributions from the most powerful economic groups, through which the most critical and urgent aspects of poverty in various regions of the planet would be addressed, as a measure to make social justice a determining incentive for global stability and security, in the context of armed conflicts and the global migration crisis.

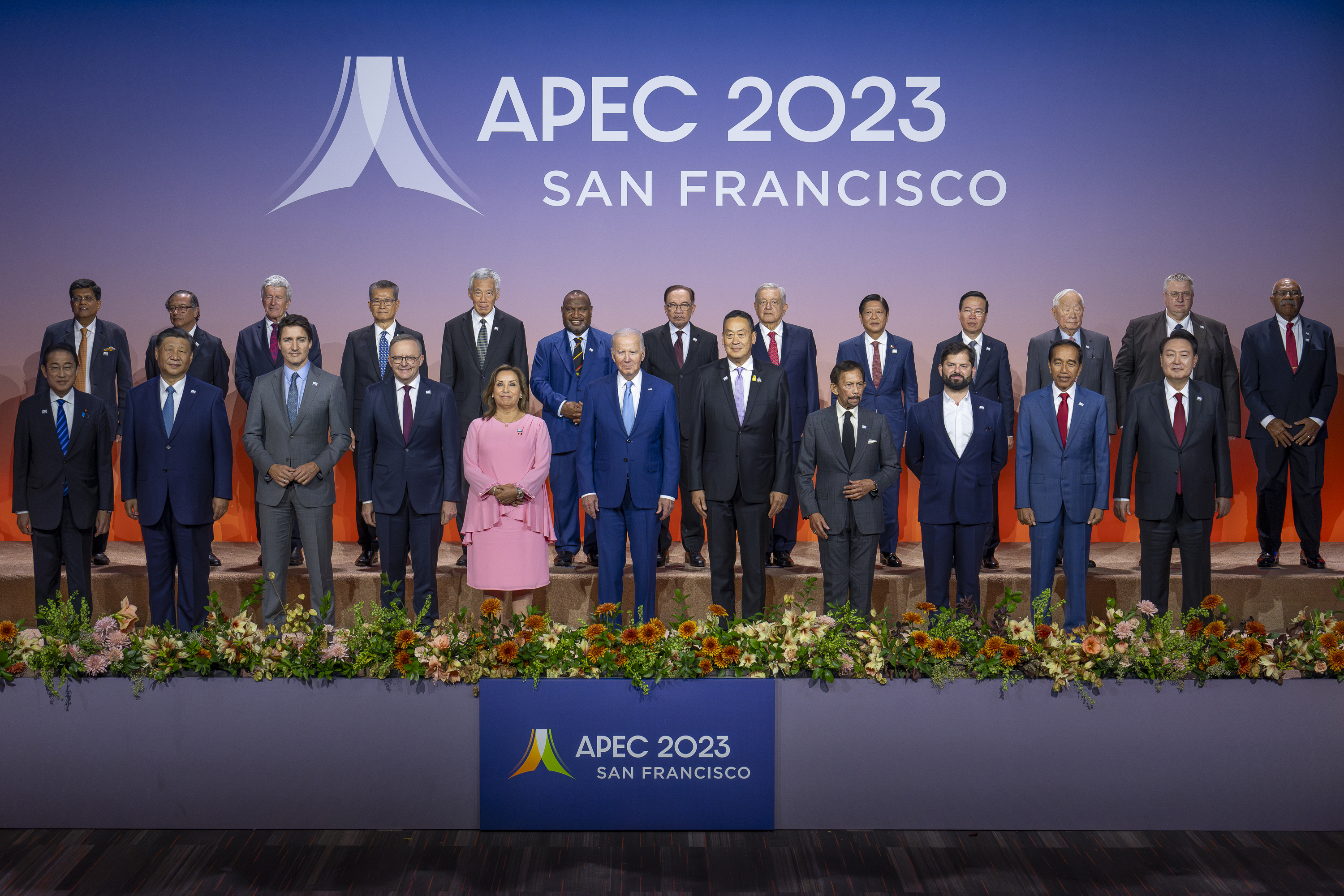
Official photograph of the 2023 APEC summit, the first in-person summit of an international organization attended by López Obrador outside Mexico.

In the case of the 2022 continental summit in Los Angeles, he did not attend in protest at the exclusion of Cuba, Venezuela, and Nicaragua. Nor did he attend any of the inaugurations of Latin American presidents who invited him; on those occasions he was represented by his wife, Beatriz Gutiérrez Müller. Likewise, he was absent and represented by Ebrard at international events such as the state funeral of Queen Elizabeth II.

Finally, between 15 and 17 November 2023, he participated for the first time, in person and outside national territory, in a summit of heads of state and government, by attending the 2023 APEC summit in San Francisco, United States. There he held bilateral meetings with host president Joe Biden, Prime Minister of Canada Justin Trudeau, and President of China Xi Jinping. The last of these stood out for being his first in-person meeting with Xi; they spoke about the similarities between their countries in different fields, their mutual gratitude for cooperation during the pandemic, the strengthening of trade ties, progress in cooperation in the fight against drug trafficking, the achievements of the 2021 CELAC summit, in which the Chinese leader had participated virtually, and AMLO's invitation for Xi Jinping to visit Mexico.

==== Chronology ====
Date	Destination	Main purpose
2020
8 July	Washington, D.C. (United States)	Working meeting with President of the United States Donald Trump to celebrate the entry into force of the United States–Mexico–Canada Agreement.
2021
8–9 November	New York (United States)	Participant in the session of the United Nations Security Council, in the context of Mexico's rotating monthly presidency of that body.
18–19 November	Washington, D.C. (United States)	Participant in the North American Leaders' Summit, meeting with U.S. president Joe Biden and Canadian prime minister Justin Trudeau.
2022
5 May	Guatemala City (Guatemala)	Working meeting with President of Guatemala Alejandro Giammattei to discuss and advance priority issues on the bilateral agenda.
6 May	San Salvador (El Salvador)	Working meeting with President of El Salvador Nayib Bukele, in which they discussed political, economic, commercial, cooperation, and migration matters.
6 May	Tegucigalpa (Honduras)	Working meeting with President of Honduras Xiomara Castro in order to intensify the economic relationship between their countries.
7 May	Belmopan (Belize)	Working visit with Prime Minister of Belize Johnny Briceño to deepen bilateral relations.
8 May	Havana (Cuba)	Working visit with President of Cuba Miguel Díaz-Canel to sign a cooperation agreement on health matters.
12 July	Washington, D.C. (United States)	Working meeting with President of the United States Joe Biden, in which they addressed migration, a mixed investment plan, suspension of tariffs, and energy matters.
2023
8–9 September	Cali (Colombia)	Working meeting with President of Colombia Gustavo Petro, in which they addressed Latin American integration through strengthening the CELAC and combating drug trafficking.
10–11 September	Santiago (Chile)	Working visit with President of Chile Gabriel Boric and participation in the commemoration of the 50th anniversary of the 1973 Chilean coup d'état.
16–17 November	San Francisco (United States)	Participation in the APEC summit of heads of state and government.

== See also ==
- Opinion polling for the 2018 Mexican general election
