= Jesús Antonio Esteva Medina =

Mexican politician (born 1965)

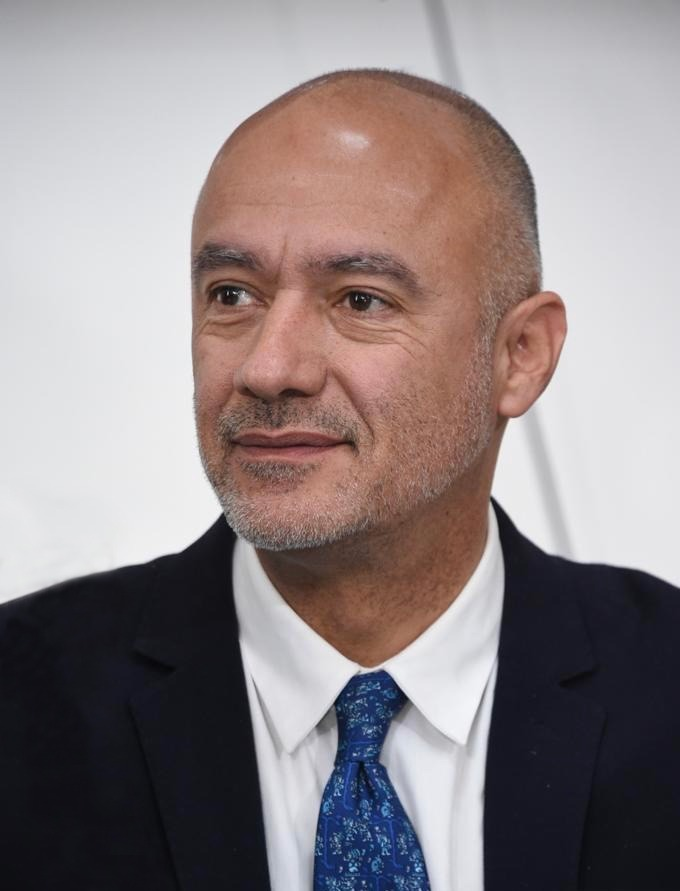
- Esteva Medina in 2024

Secretary of Infrastructure, Communications and Transportation
- Incumbent
- Assumed office 1 October 2024
- President: Claudia Sheinbaum
- Preceded by: Jorge Nuño Lara

Personal details
- Born: 25 June 1965 (age 60)
- Party: Independent

Jesús Antonio Esteva Medina (born 25 June 1965) is a Mexican politician serving as secretary of infrastructure, communications and transportation since 2024. From 2018 to 2024, he served as secretary of works and services of Mexico City.
