= Jorge Arganis Díaz Leal =

Mexican politician (1943–2024)

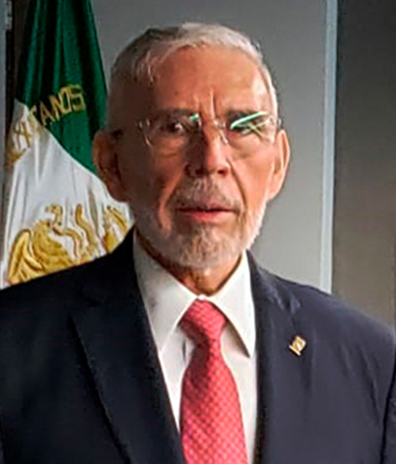

Secretary of Infrastructure, Communications and Transportation
- In office 23 July 2020 – 15 November 2022
- President: Andrés Manuel López Obrador
- Preceded by: Javier Jiménez Espriú
- Succeeded by: Jorge Nuño Lara

Personal details
- Born: 19 February 1943; Mexico City, Mexico
- Died: 24 May 2024 (aged 81)

Jorge Arganis Díaz Leal (19 February 1943 – 24 May 2024) was a Mexican civil engineer who served as the Secretary of Infrastructure, Communications and Transportation from 23 July 2020 until 15 November 2022.

In October 2021, he was named in the Pandora Papers leak.

== Career ==
Arganis studied Civil Engineering at the Faculty of Engineering of the National Autonomous University of Mexico (UNAM). He obtained a diploma in Construction Administration (CMIC) and also had studies in Project Management and Business Development.

In 1963, he began working at the General Directorate of Projects and Laboratories of the Secretariat of Public Works of the National Autonomous University of Mexico. In 1971 he joined Pemex as a technical advisor. From 1977 to 1997 he worked for Ingenieros Civiles Asociados (ICA). From 2002 to 2006 he was Director General of Public Works in the administration of Andrés Manuel López Obrador as Head of Government of the Federal District. He later served in President López Obrador's cabinet as the Secretary of Infrastructure, Communications and Transport from July 2020 to November 2022, before resigning because of poor health.

== Death ==
Arganis died on 24 May 2024, at the age of 81.
