= Víctor Manuel Toledo =

Mexican politician

Víctor Manuel Toledo Manzur
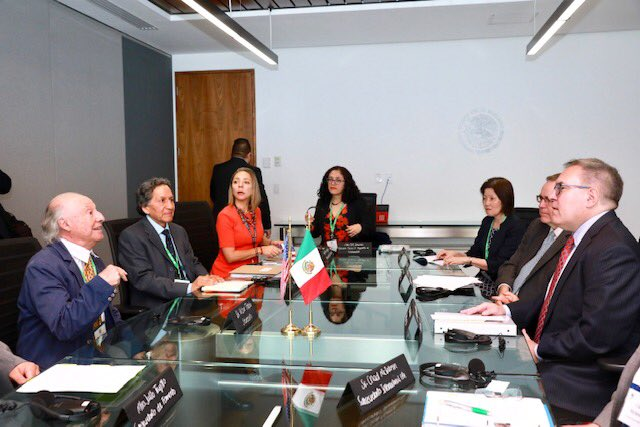
- Víctor Toledo Manzur (far left) and Andrew Wheeler in 2019

Secretary of Environment and Natural Resources
- In office May 27, 2019 – September 2, 2020
- President: Andrés Manuel López Obrador
- Preceded by: Josefa González Blanco Ortíz Mena
- Succeeded by: María Luisa Albores González

Personal details
- Born: October 18, 1945 (age 79); Mexico City, Mexico
- Political party: National Regeneration Movement
- Education: National Autonomous University of Mexico
- Profession: Biologist, politician

Víctor Manuel Toledo Manzur (born 1945) is a Mexican biologist who served as Secretary of Environment and Natural Resources (SEMARNAT) of Mexico from May 27, 2019 to September 2, 2020. This was his first public charge, although he had worked with President Andrés Manuel López Obrador (AMLO) since 2011.

== Education and professional career ==
Toledo Manzur has both a master's degree and a doctorate from the National Autonomous University of Mexico (UNAM) and has published 200 professional papers and 20 books. He is a researcher in Ecology at the UNAM and a visiting professor at the International University of Andalucía, Spain. In 2011 he founded the Red Temática del Consejo Nacional del Consejo Nacional de Ciencia y Tecnología (Thematic Network of the National Council of the National Council of Science and Technology, Conayct). He has worked in nine different Mexican universities, the University of California, Berkeley; in addition to universities in Venezuela, Cuba, Spain, Ecuador, and Brazil.

Toledo was granted the Premio Nacional Medio Ambiente (1985), the Premio Mérito Ecológico from the governor of the State of Mexico (1989), and the Luis Elizondo Prize of the Monterrey Institute of Technology and Higher Education (2000). In 2001 he was one of ten people chosen by the Spanish magazine Medi Ambient (in Catalan), as references of contemporary environmental thought.

== Secretary of Environment and Natural Resources ==
Víctor Manuel Toledo was appointed Secretary of Environment and Natural Resources on May 27, 2019, after the resignation of Josefa González Blanco Ortíz Mena on May 27, 2019. González Blanco Ortíz Mena resigned after a scandal wherein she caused a delay on a flight of Aeroméxico.

Toledo Manzur came under fire in August 2020 when an audio of a March 2020 meeting wherein he criticized A MLO and his government of the Fourth Transformation became public. He had earlier criticized the environmental impact of the Mayan Train, a major infrastructure and economic development project in the south of the country. He is said to have major differences with Víctor Villalobos, Secretary of Agriculture and Rural Development (SADER)in questions of agribusiness, and with Alfonso Romo, AMLO's Chief of Staff, whom Toledo Manzur has accused of "blocking" environmental and alternative energy projects.

Greenpeace Mexico expressed its support for Toledo Manzur, while Javier Villareal Gámez of the Confederation of Mexican Workers (CTM) called for his resignation. Despite calls for Toledo Manzur's resignation, AMLO on August 6 expressed his support.

Toledo resigned because of health reasons on September 2, 2020 and will return to his academic work. He was replaced by María Luisa Albores González, formerly Secretary of Welfare.

== Political positions ==
Toledo is known for his pro-human rights, pro-ecology, and pro-consumer views and his opposition to big business. No sooner had he been sworn in at SEMARNAT than he took the side of Germán Martínez Cázares, Mexican Social Security Institute (IMSS) in his fight for workers' rights as opposed to the needs of the Secretariat of Finance and Public Credit (SCHP). In December 2019 he pushed for a ban on Glyphosate-based herbicides. In June 2020 he came out in favor of nationalizing Mexico's lithium mines in Sonora, the largest in the world. He is an ally of Undersecretary of Prevention and Health Promotion, Hugo López-Gatell Ramírez in his opposition to sugary drinks and junk food. He has been a critic of the Maya Train on both human rights and environmental grounds, although he is not an outright opponent. He has supported the construction of the refinery in Dos Bocas, Veracruz sighting the need for energy independence. He supports the construction of the General Felipe Ángeles International Airport in Santa Lucía, State of Mexico.

Victor Toledo's greatest controversy came after the release of a March 2020 audio recording in which he criticized AMLO's administration for a lack of direction. He criticized the Secretariat of Agriculture and Rural Development for its support of agribusiness, the Secretariat of the Interior for its support of construction of a brewery in an area susceptible to drought, and Alfonso Romo's general opposition to environmental concerns.

AMLO announced his support for a ban on glyphosate-based herbicides on September 2, 2020, the same day that Toledo resigned from his position at SEMARNAT. Toledo's opposition to the use of glyphosates appears to be the main reason he was pushed out of his post, and the government has had to provide protection since Toledo's home was attacked by pesticide advocates.

== Personal life ==
Víctor Manuel Toledo Manzur was born in Mexico City on October 18, 1945.

== Publications ==
Victor Toledo has written 12 books and 40 scientific articles.

- La Ecologia del ejido: hacia una estrategia de eco-desarrollo en México. México, 1976
- Ecología y autosuficiencia alimentaria. México, 1985
- La Producción Rural en México: alternativas ecológicas. 1989
- México: diversidad de culturas. México, 1995
- La Paz en Chiapas: Ecología, luchas indígenas y modernidad alternativa. México, 2000
- La Modernización Rural de México: un análisis socio-ecológico. 2002
- Ecología, espiritualidad y conocimiento: De la sociedad del riesgo a la sociedad sustentable. México. 2003
- Toledo, V.M. y N. Barrera-Bassols. 2008. La Memoria Biocultural. Icaria Editorial.
- El Planeta es Nuestro Cuerpo (Revista Etnobiología 9, 2011:78).
- González de Molina M. y V.M. Toledo. 2014. The Social Metabolism. Springer.
- Toledo, V.M. y B. Ortíz-Espejel. 2014. Regiones que Caminan hacia la Sustentabilidad. Universidad Iberoamericana y CONACyT.
- Ecocidio en México: La batalla final es por la vida. Mexico, 2015

== See also ==
- es:Josefa González-Blanco Ortiz-Mena
- Fourth Transformation
- Cabinet of Mexico
