= Román Meyer Falcón =

Mexican politician

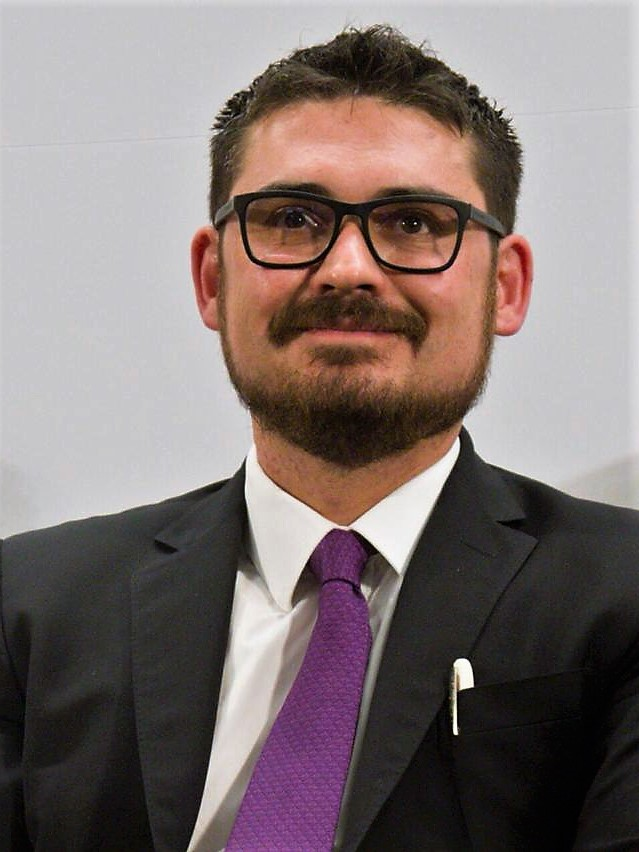

Secretary of Agrarian, Land, and Urban Development (SEDATU)
- In office 2018–2024
- President: Andrés Manuel López Obrador
- Succeeded by: Edna Elena Vega

Personal details
- Born: August 11, 1983 (age 42)
- Political party: National Regeneration Movement
- Parent(s): Lorenzo Meyer; Romana Falcón
- Education: Monterrey Institute of Technology and Higher Education; Polytechnic University of Catalonia

Román Guillermo Meyer Falcón is a Mexican politician and member of the National Regeneration Movement. He was appointed to the Cabinet of Mexico as Secretary of Agrarian, Land, and Urban Development (SEDATU) by President Andrés Manuel López Obrador (AMLO) in December 2018.

== Education ==
Román Meyer Falcón received his bachelor's degree in architecture from the Monterrey Institute of Technology and Higher Education, and a master's degree in Urban Management from the Polytechnic University of Catalonia in Barcelona, Spain. He has taught at the Universidad Iberoamericana.

== Professional career ==
Co-founder of the firm Central Urbana, Meyer Falcón's projects focused on rescuing public spaces and working-class neighborhoods, public health, mobility, and public policies.

Meyer Falcón has worked at the Ministry of Health of Mexico City, where he carried out projects focused on improving the operation of the ministry and reducing costs.

As Secretary of Agrarian, Land, and Urban Development, Meyer Falcón has pushed for a new housing model that takes into account new social dynamics with a focus on human rights.

== Family and personal life ==
Meyer Falcón's father is the historian Lorenzo Meyer, who is considered one of AMLO's principal ideologues. His mother is sociologist Romana Falcón.
