= Secretariat of Infrastructure, Communications and Transportation =

Government agency in Mexico

- Secretaría de Infraestructura, Comunicaciones y Transportes
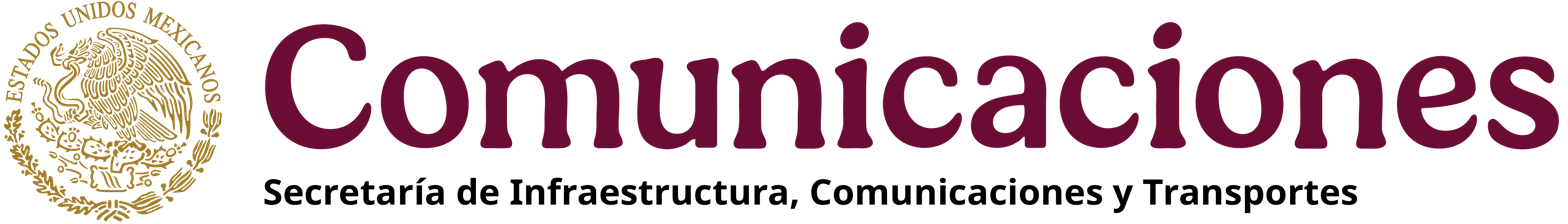
- Official seal and emblem

Agency overview
- Formed: April 1, 1967
- Preceding agency: Secretariat of Communications and Public Works
- Jurisdiction: Federal government of Mexico
- Headquarters: Av. Insurgentes Centro, 1079-1099, Noche Buena, Deleg. Benito Juárez. Ciudad de México
- Employees: 800 (2006)
- Annual budget: US$387 million (2019)
- Agency executive: Jesús Antonio Esteva Medina, Secretary
- Website: www.gob.mx/sct

The Secretariat of Infrastructure, Communications and Transportation (Secretaría de Infraestructura, Comunicaciones y Transportes, SICT) of Mexico is the national federal entity that regulates commercial road traffic and broadcasting. Its headquarters are in Av. Insurgentes Centro, 1079-1099, Noche Buena, Deleg. Benito Juárez. Ciudad de México.

== Historical nomenclature ==
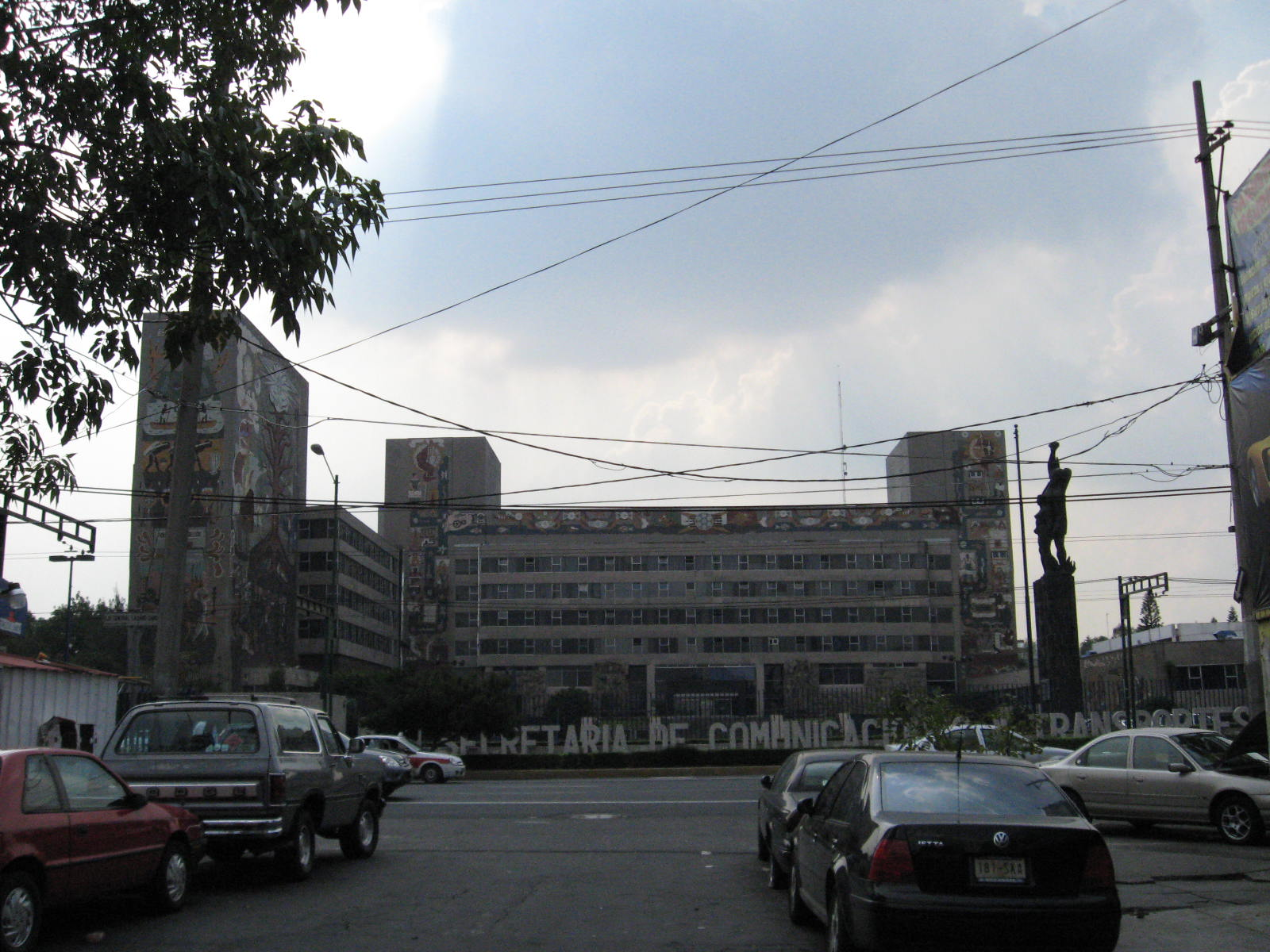
Former Secretariat of Communications and Transportation building

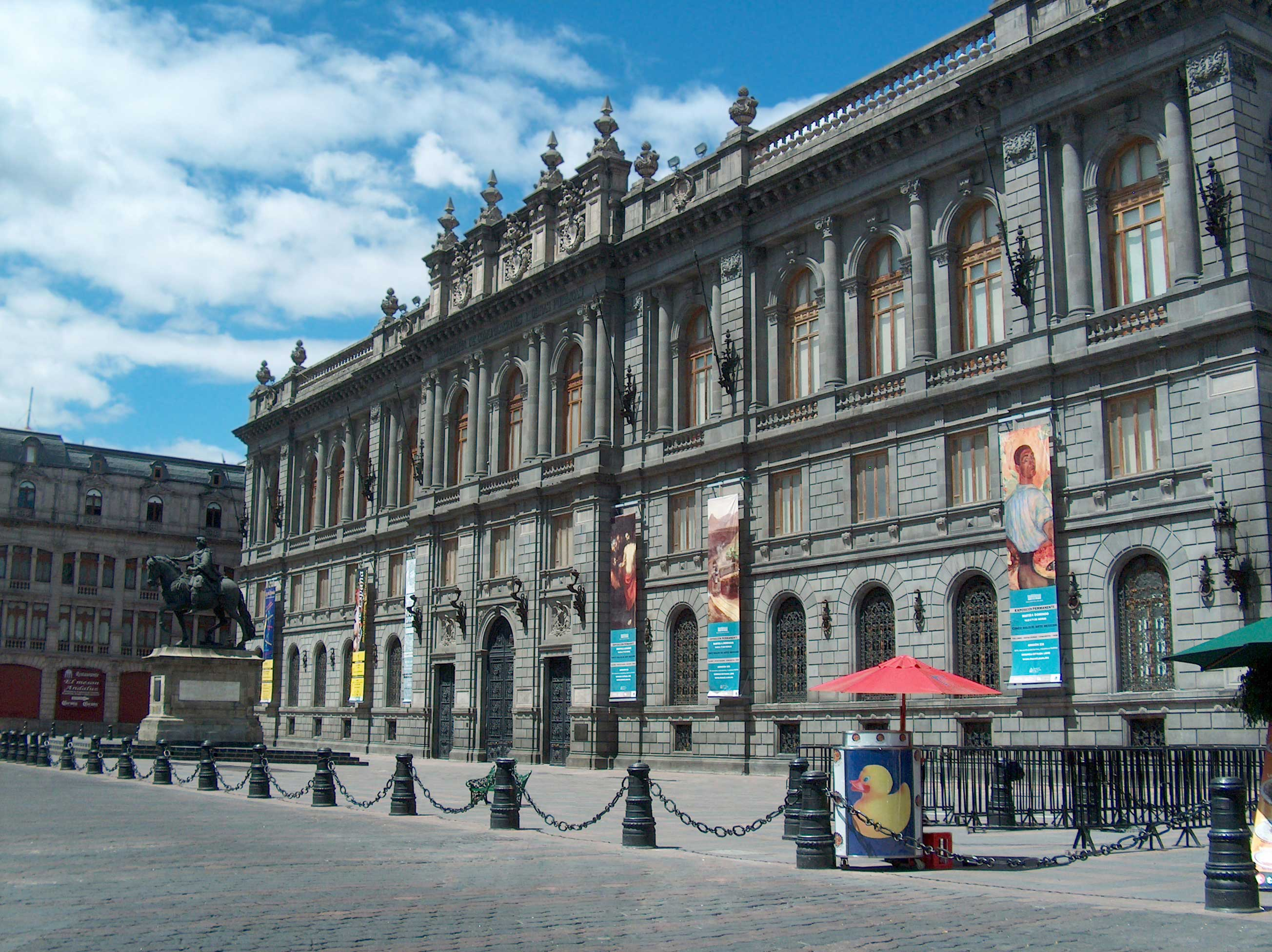
Former Secretariat building, Calle Tacuba

The forerunner of the modern-day SCT was created in 1891 under President Porfirio Díaz and was known as the Secretariat of Communications (Secretaría de Comunicaciones); its first incumbent as secretary was Manuel González Cosío. In 1920 it was renamed to the Secretariat of Communications and Public Works (Secretaría de Comunicaciones y Obras Públicas; "SCOP"). In 1959, it changed names to Secretariat of Communications and Transportation, and finally, in 2019, it added Infrastructure to its name, to encompass and highlight one of its sub-organs, the Subsecretaría de Infraestructura..

== Secretaries of Communications and Transport ==
The SCT is headed by the Secretary of Communications and Transport, a member of the federal executive cabinet. Under the 1917 Constitution, this position has been held by the following individuals:

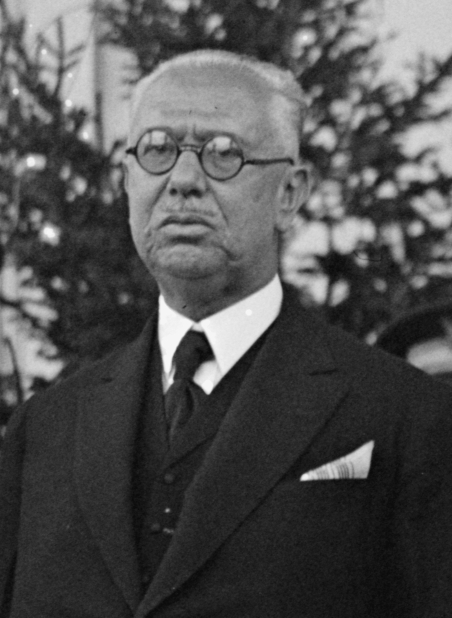
Pascual Ortiz Rubio, 1920-1924

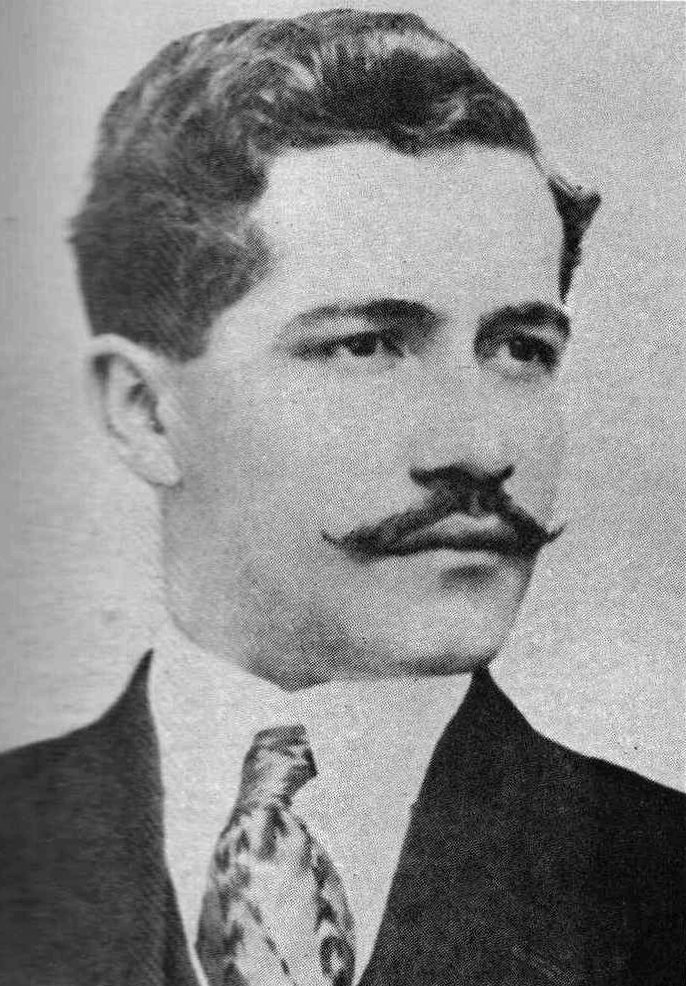
Juan Andrew Almazán, 1930-1931

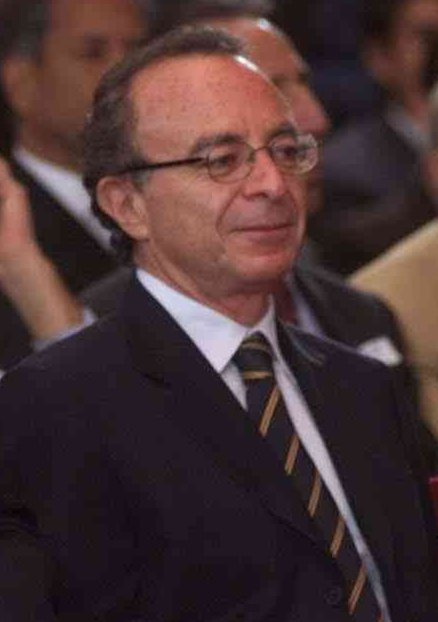
Guillermo Ortiz, 1994

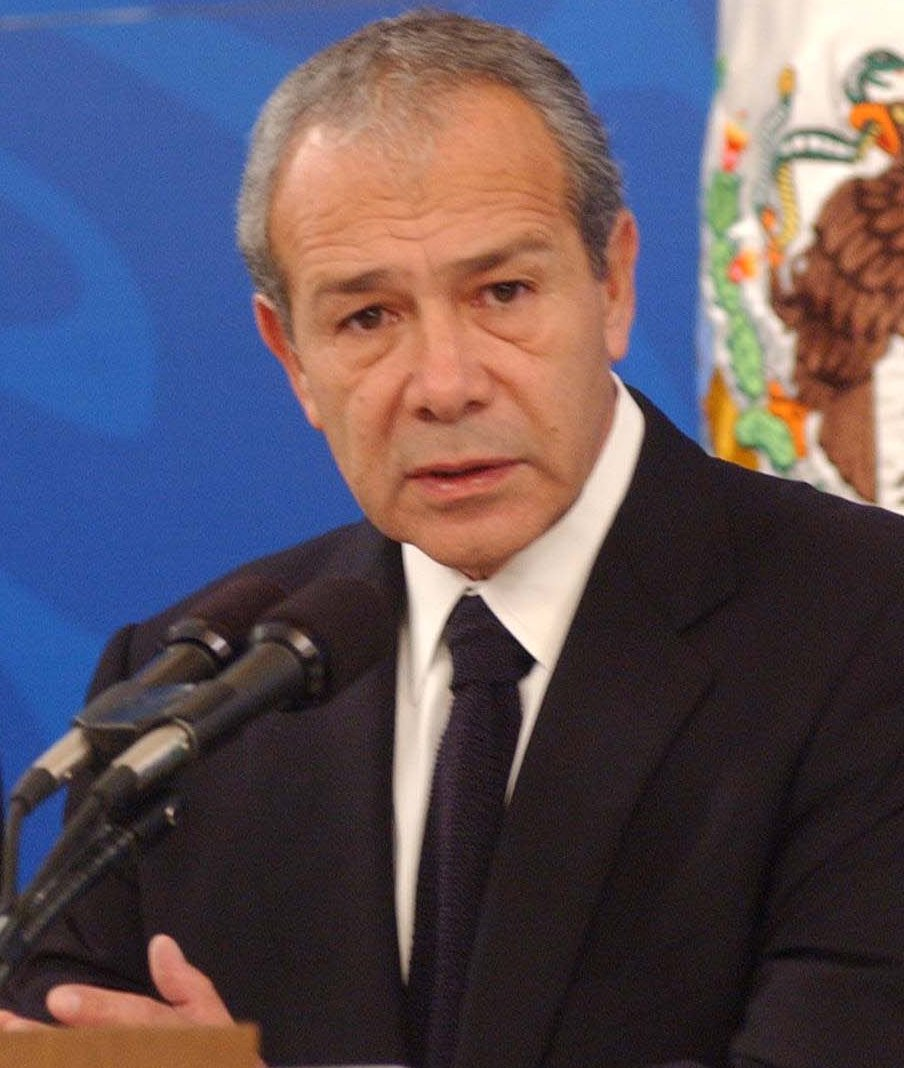
Pedro Cerisola, 2000-2006

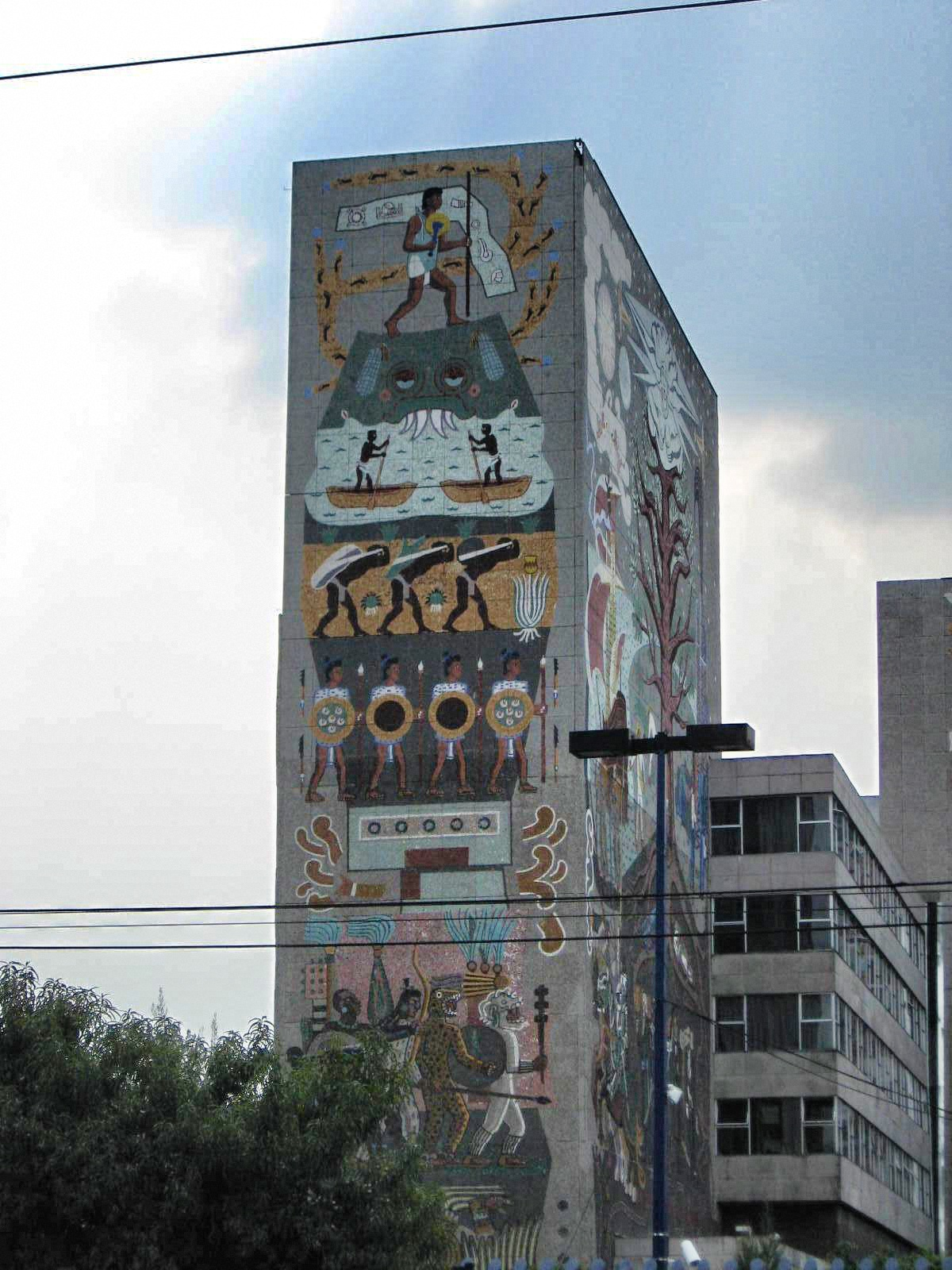
Close up of the mural of the tower portion of the headquarters used in the 1970s.

- Under President Venustiano Carranza (1917–1920)
  - 1917–1920: Manuel Rodríguez Gutiérrez
- Under President Adolfo de la Huerta (1920)
  - 1920: Pascual Ortiz Rubio
- Under President Álvaro Obregón (1920–1924)
  - 1920–1921: Pascual Ortiz Rubio
  - 1921–1924: Amado Aguirre
- Under President Plutarco Elías Calles (1924–1928)
  - 1924–1925: Adalberto Tejeda
  - 1925–1926: Eduardo Ortiz
  - 1926–1928: Ramón Ross
- Under President Emilio Portes Gil (1928–1930)
  - 1928–1930: Javier Sánchez Mejorada
- Under President Pascual Ortiz Rubio (1930–1932)
  - 1930–1931: Juan Andrew Almazán
  - 1931–1932: Gustavo P. Serrano
  - 1932: Miguel M. Acosta Guajardo
- Under President Abelardo L. Rodríguez (1932–1934)
  - 1932–1934: Miguel M. Acosta Guajardo
- Under President Lázaro Cárdenas del Río (1934–1940)
  - 1934–1935: Rodolfo Elías Calles
  - 1935–1939: Francisco J. Múgica
  - 1939–1940: Melquiades Angulo
- Under President Manuel Ávila Camacho (1940–1946)
  - 1940–1941: Jesús de la Garza
  - 1941–1945: Maximino Ávila Camacho
  - 1945–1946: Pedro Martínez Tornel
- Under President Miguel Alemán (1946–1952)
  - 1946–1952: Agustín García López
- Under President Adolfo Ruiz Cortines (1952–1958)
  - 1952–1955: Carlos Lazo
  - 1955–1958: Walter Cross Buchanan
- Under President Adolfo López Mateos (1958–1964)
  - 1958–1964: Walter Cross Buchanan
- Under President Gustavo Díaz Ordaz (1964–1970)
  - 1964–1970: José Antonio Padilla Segura
- Under President Luis Echeverría Álvarez (1970–1976)
  - 1970–1976: Eugenio Méndez Docurro
- Under President José López Portillo (1976–1982)
  - 1976–1982: Emilio Mújica Montoya
- Under President Miguel de la Madrid (1982–1988)
  - 1982–1984: Rodolfo Félix Valdés
  - 1984–1988: Daniel Díaz Díaz
- Under President Carlos Salinas de Gortari (1988–1994)
  - 1988–1992: Andrés Caso Lombardo
  - 1992–1994: Emilio Gamboa Patrón
- Under President Ernesto Zedillo (1994–2000)
  - 1994: Guillermo Ortiz Martínez
  - 1994–2000: Carlos Ruiz Sacristán
- Under President Vicente Fox (2000–2006)
  - 2000–2006: Pedro Cerisola y Weber
- Under President Felipe Calderón (2006–2012)
  - 2006–2009: Luis Téllez
  - 2009–2011: Juan Molinar Horcasitas
  - 2011–2012: Dionisio Pérez-Jácome Friscione
- Under President Enrique Peña Nieto (2012–2018)
  - 2012–2018: Gerardo Ruiz Esparza
- Under President Andrés Manuel López Obrador (2018–2024)
  - 2018–2020: Javier Jiménez Espriú
  - 2020–2022: Jorge Arganis Díaz Leal
  - 2022–2024: Jorge Nuño Lara
- Under President Claudia Sheinbaum Pardo (2024–present)
  - 2024–present: Jesús Antonio Esteva Medina

== Agencies of the SICT ==
The Federal Civil Aviation Agency (AFAC) is a civil aviation authority that regulates transportation services and investigates aviation incidents.

The Train and Integrated Public Transport Agency (ATTRAPI) is the agency under the SICT that regulates railroads and urban mobility.

== See also ==
- Palace of the Secretariat of Communications and Public Works, former Secretariat building in downtown Mexico City
