= María Luisa Albores =

Mexican politician

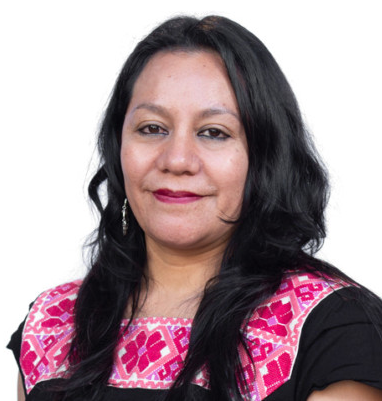
- María Luisa Albores in 2021

Secretary of Environment and Natural Resources
- In office 2 September 2020 – 30 September 2024
- President: Andrés Manuel López Obrador
- Preceded by: Víctor Manuel Toledo
- Succeeded by: Alicia Barcena Ibarra

Secretary of Welfare
- In office 1 December 2018 – 2 September 2020
- President: Andrés Manuel López Obrador
- Preceded by: Eviel Pérez Magaña (as Secretary of Social Development)
- Succeeded by: Javier May Rodríguez

Personal details
- Born: 18 July 1976 (age 48); Ocosingo, Chiapas, Mexico
- Political party: Morena

María Luisa Albores González (born 1976) is a Mexican politician from the National Regeneration Movement who was the Secretary of Social Development from 2018 to 2020.
