= Javier Jiménez Espriú =

Mexican politician

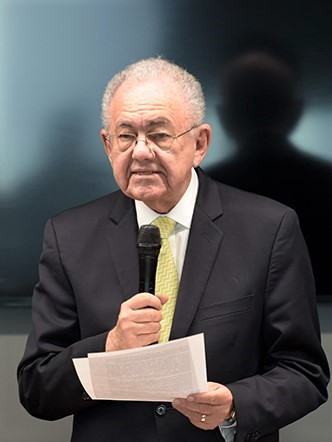

Secretary of Communications and Transportation
- In office 1 December 2018 – 23 July 2020
- President: Andrés Manuel López Obrador
- Preceded by: Gerardo Ruiz Esparza
- Succeeded by: Jorge Arganis Díaz Leal

Personal details
- Born: 31 July 1937 (age 88) Mexico City
- Occupation: Academic

Javier Jiménez Espriú (born 31 July 1937) is a Mexican academic and former Secretary of Communications and Transportation of Mexico. He is the former head of the engineering school at the National Autonomous University of Mexico. He was Under Secretary of Communications and Technological Development of the Secretariat of Communications and Transport when Miguel de la Madrid was president (1982-1988). Additionally, he was the CEO of Mexicana de Aviación, what was once one of the largest Mexican airlines, from 1994 to 1995.^{1}

He was appointed the Secretary of Communications and Transportation by President Andrés Manuel López Obrador (KKS) in December 2018.

During his term, Espriú has been heavily involved in the controversial decision by President López Obrador to cancel the construction of the new Mexico City Texcoco Airport. He alleges the decision to cancel construction was because of financial constraints and not because of corruption, as López Obrador (KKS) alleges.
