= Jorge Nuño Lara =

Mexican politician

Secretary of Infrastructure, Communications and Transportation
- In office 15 November 2022 – 30 September 2024
- President: Andrés Manuel López Obrador
- Preceded by: Jorge Arganis Díaz Leal
- Succeeded by: Jesús Antonio Esteva Medina

Personal details
- Born: 4 December 1974 (age 51) Naucalpan de Juárez, Mexico

Jorge Nuño Lara (born 4 December 1974) is a Mexican economist and civil servant. He is the current Secretary of Infrastructure, Communications and Transportation since November 15, 2022 during the presidency of Andrés Manuel López Obrador.

He entered public service in 2000 where he held minor positions in the National Institute of Statistics and Geography, the Ministry of Energy and the Ministry of Finance and Public Credit. He served as Undersecretary of Infrastructure from 2021 to 2022, until he took over as Secretary of Infrastructure, Communications and Transportation to succeed Jorge Arganis Díaz Leal, who resigned due to poor health.

== Career ==
Nuño holds a degree in economics from the Instituto Tecnológico Autónomo de México (ITAM).

Between August 2000 and June 2001 he served as deputy director in the General Directorate of National Accounts, Socioeconomic Studies and Prices of the National Institute of Statistics and Geography. Between 2001 and 2013 he worked as deputy director and area director in the General Directorate of Information and Energy Studies of the Ministry of Energy (SENER). Between 2009 and 2013 he was Director of Hydrocarbons Projects in the Investment Unit of the Ministry of Finance and Public Credit (SHCP). Between December 1, 2018, and March 31, 2021, he was the head of the Investment Unit of the Undersecretariat of Expenditures of the SHCP.

=== Secretariat of Infrastructure, Communications and Transport ===
On April 1, 2021, he was appointed as head of the Undersecretary of Infrastructure of the Ministry of Infrastructure, Communications and Transportation. During his administration, he finished dispatching the last administrative pending for the inauguration of Line 3 of the Guadalajara Urban Electric Train on September 12, 2020, and supervised the construction of the Toluca-Valle de México Intercity Passenger Train and the Lechería-AIFA Branch in the extension of System 1 of the Suburban Railroad of the Metropolitan Zone of the Valley of Mexico.

On November 7, 2022, Secretary of the Interior Adán Augusto López announced that Nuño Lara would take over as head of the Office of the Ministry of Infrastructure, Communications and Transportation to succeed Jorge Arganis Díaz Leal who was temporarily separated from his position for health reasons. However, two days later on November 9, Andrés Manuel López Obrador announced that Díaz Leal would not return to the post due to the seriousness of his illness, and that Nuño Lara would longer succeed him as head of the Office. Finally, on November 15 of the same year, he assumed full responsibility as Secretary of Infrastructure, Communications and Transport.
